= 2026–27 Millwall F.C. season =

English football club season

Millwall
2026–27 season
- Chairman: James Berylson
- Head coach: Alex Neil
- Stadium: The Den
- Championship: 16th
- FA Cup: Third round
- EFL Cup: Third round
- Highest home attendance: 19,984 v Queens Park Rangers
Home colours	Away colours

The 2026–27 season is the 142nd season in the history of Millwall Football Club, their 50th season in the second tier of English football, and their tenth consecutive season in the Championship, which is their longest streak. This season marks Millwall's 100th season in the English Football League. In addition to the domestic league, the club will also participate in the FA Cup and the EFL Cup.

Millwall's 3–0 win over Norwich City on 22 August 2026, was the first match at which home supporters were allowed in the North Stand.

== Current squad ==
As of 20 May 2026

Note: Flags indicate national team as has been defined under FIFA eligibility rules. Players may hold more than one non-FIFA nationality.

Note: Appearances and goals are for all competitions, taken at the start of the season.

No.	Nationality	Name	Position	Place of Birth	Date of Birth (Age)	Apps.	Goals	Signed From	Date Signed	Transfer Fee	Contract End
Goalkeepers
1	(Denmark)	Lukas Jensen	GK	Helsingør	18 March 1999 (age 27)	43	0	(England) Lincoln City	11 July 2024	Undisclosed	30 June 2027
15	(New Zealand)	Max Crocombe	GK	Auckland	12 August 1993 (age 33)	26	0	(England) Burton Albion	24 June 2025	Free Transfer	30 June 2027
34	(England)	Filip Marschall	GK	Cambridge	24 April 2003 (age 23)	0	0	(England) Stevenage	1 September 2026	Undisclosed	
41	(England)	George Evans	GK	London	16 May 2005 (age 21)	4	0	Academy	1 July 2024	Trainee	30 June 2028
43	(England)	Joel Coleman	GK	Bolton	26 September 1995 (age 31)	0	0	(England) Bolton Wanderers	26 August 2025	Free Transfer	30 June 2027
Defenders
2	(England)	Jordi Osei-Tutu	RB	Slough	2 October 1998 (age 28)	0	0	(England) Bolton Wanderers	21 August 2026	Free Transfer	30 June 2027
3	(England)	Zak Sturge	LB	Hillingdon	15 June 2004 (age 22)	47	1	(England) Chelsea	14 July 2025	Undisclosed	30 June 2028
4	(France)	Tristan Crama	CB	Béziers	8 November 2001 (age 25)	70	3	(England) Brentford	17 January 2025	Undisclosed	30 June 2028
5	(England)	Jake Cooper (captain)	CB	Burnley	3 February 1995 (age 31)	435	33	(England) Reading	1 July 2017	Undisclosed (Reported £500k)	30 June 2027
6	(England)	Caleb Taylor	CB	Bracknell	14 January 2003 (age 23)	29	3	(England) West Bromwich Albion	29 Aug 2025	Undisclosed (Reported £2.5m)	30 June 2029
12	(Indonesia)	Elkan Baggott	CB	Bangkok	23 October 2002 (age 24)	0	0	(England) Ipswich Town	15 July 2026	Undisclosed	30 June 2029
18	(England)	Ryan Leonard (vice-captain)	CM/CB/RB	Plympton	24 May 1992 (age 34)	229	8	(England) Sheffield United	2 January 2019	£1.5m	30 June 2028
23	(England)	Danny Batth	CB	Brierley Hill	21 September 1990 (age 36)	0	0	(England) Derby County	2 August 2026	Free Transfer	30 June 2027
55	(England)	Tristan Parkes	DF			0	0	Academy			
	(England)	Wahab Ojetoro	LB			0	0	(Wales) Swansea City	1 September 2026	Free Transfer	
	(England)	Lloyd Ofori-Manteaw	CB			0	0	(England) Norwich City	1 September 2026	Free Transfer	
Midfielders
8	(Belgium)	Mathis Servais	CAM	Namur	23 November 2004 (age 21)	0	0	(Belgium) Mechelen	6 July 2026	£5.1m	30 June 2029
10	(Algeria)	Camiel Neghli	LW/RW	Ede	6 November 2001 (age 25)	55	6	(Netherlands) Sparta Rotterdam	31 January 2025	Undisclosed (Reported £3m)	30 June 2028
14	(England)	Jenson Metcalfe	CM	Wigan	6 September 2004 (age 22)	0	0	(England) Bradford City	16 June 2026	Undisclosed	30 June 2029
16	(Scotland)	Daniel Kelly	CM	East Renfrewshire	3 October 2005 (age 21)	16	0	(Scotland) Celtic	23 August 2024	Undisclosed (Reported £400k)	30 June 2027
17	(Republic of Ireland)	Mark Sykes	RM	Belfast	4 August 1997 (age 29)	0	0	(England) Bristol City	9 July 2026	Free Transfer	30 June 2028
21	(Australia)	Massimo Luongo	CM	Sydney	25 September 1992 (age 34)	11	1	(England) Ipswich Town	25 July 2025	Free Transfer	30 June 2027
24	(Belgium)	Casper de Norre	CM	Hasselt	7 February 1997 (age 29)	115	6	(Belgium) OH Leuven	21 July 2023	Undisclosed (Reported £3.4m)	30 June 2028
25	(England)	Luke Cundle	CAM	Warrington	26 April 2002 (age 24)	50	5	(England) Wolverhampton Wanderers	31 January 2025	Undisclosed (Reported £1m)	30 June 2028
26	(England)	Benicio Baker	LW/RW	Hammersmith	9 January 2004 (age 22)	0	0	(England) Brighton & Hove Albion	3 February 2025	Undisclosed	30 June 2028
45	(England)	Alfie Doughty	LWB/LW	London	21 December 1999 (age 26)	28	0	(England) Luton Town	28 July 2025	Undisclosed	30 July 2028
49	(France)	Derek Mazou-Sacko	CM	Sarcelles	6 October 2004 (age 22)	24	1	(France) Troyes	31 August 2025	Undisclosed	30 June 2029
Forwards
7	(Guadeloupe)	Taïryk Arconte	CF	Les Abymes	12 November 2003 (age 23)	0	0	(France) Rodez	23 June 2026	£2.6m	30 June 2029
9	(Serbia)	Mihailo Ivanović	CF	Novi Sad	29 November 2004 (age 21)	87	22	(Serbia) Vojvodina	30 August 2024	Undisclosed (Reported £2.8m)	30 June 2027
11	(England)	Romain Esse	RW	Lambeth	13 May 2005 (age 21)	66	7	(England) Crystal Palace	2 September 2026	Loan	End of season
19	(England)	Josh Coburn	CF	Bedale	6 December 2002 (age 23)	52	15	(England) Middlesbrough	26 June 2025	Undisclosed (Reported £5m)	30 June 2028
22	(England)	Kyrell Lisbie	LW	London	1 December 2003 (age 22)	0	0	(England) Peterborough	26 July 2026	Undisclosed	30 June 2029
29	(England)	Zak Lovelace	CF	Wandsworth	23 January 2006 (age 20)	4	0	(Scotland) Rangers	3 February 2025	Undisclosed	30 June 2028
35	(France)	Yanis Issoufou	LW	France	28 October 2006 (age 20)	0	0	(France) Montpellier	4 September 2026	Undisclosed	
13	(Scotland)	Lyndon Dykes	CF	Gold Coast	7 October 1995 (age 31)	0	0	(England) Charlton	6 August 2026	Free Transfer	30 June 2027
57	(England)	Regan Anderson	FW			0	0	Academy			
Out on Loan
27	(England)	Kamarl Grant	CB	London	26 January 2003 (age 23)	0	0	(England) Sheffield United	1 July 2022	Undisclosed	30 June 2028
31	(England)	Raees Bangura-Williams	LW/RW	Lambeth	2 July 2004 (age 22)	31	2	(England) Tooting & Mitcham United	31 December 2023	Undisclosed	30 June 2027
28	(England)	Ajay Matthews	LW/RW	Middlesbrough	11 June 2006 (age 20)	3	0	(England) Middlesbrough	30 January 2025	Undisclosed	30 June 2028

== Transfers ==
=== In ===
Date	Pos.	Player	From	Fee	Ref.
16 June 2026	CM	(England) Jenson Metcalfe	(England) Bradford City	Undisclosed	
23 June 2026	CF	(Guadeloupe) Taïryk Arconte	(France) Rodez	£2,600,000	
6 July 2026	CAM	(Belgium) Mathis Servais	(Belgium) Mechelen	£5,100,000	
9 July 2026	RM	(Republic of Ireland) Mark Sykes	(England) Bristol City	Free	
15 July 2026	CB	(Indonesia) Elkan Baggott	(England) Ipswich Town	Undisclosed	
26 July 2026	LW	(England) Kyrell Lisbie	(England) Peterborough United	£3,000,000 (Note: A potential further £3,000,000 in add-ons)	
2 August 2026	CB	(England) Danny Batth	(England) Derby County	Free	
6 August 2026	CF	(Scotland) Lyndon Dykes	(England) Charlton Athletic	Free	
21 August 2026	RB	(England) Jordi Osei-Tutu	(England) Bolton Wanderers	Free	
1 September 2026	GK	(England) Filip Marschall	(England) Stevenage	Undisclosed	
1 September 2026	CB	(England) Lloyd Ofori-Manteaw	(England) Norwich City	Free	
1 September 2026	LB	(England) Wahab Ojetoro	(Wales) Swansea City	Free	
4 September 2026	LW	(France) Yanis Issoufou	(France) Montpellier	£2,100,000	

Expenditure: ▼ ~ £10,700,000 (excluding add-ons)

=== Out ===
Date	Pos.	Player	To	Fee	Ref.
3 July 2026	CF	(England) Macaulay Langstaff	(England) Salford City	Undisclosed	
9 July 2026	CM	(Scotland) Barry Bannan	(England) Sheffield Wednesday	Free transfer	
14 July 2026	LB	(England) Adam Mayor	(Scotland) Hibernian	Undisclosed	
2 September 2026	RW	(Nigeria) Femi Azeez	(England) Brighton & Hove Albion	£12,500,000 (Note: A potential further £2,500,000 in add-ons.)	

Income: ▲ ~ £12,500,000

=== Loaned in ===
Date	Pos.	Player	From	Loaned until	Ref.
2 September 2026	RW	(England) Romain Esse	(England) Crystal Palace	End of Season	

=== Loaned out ===
Date	Pos.	Player	To	Loaned until	Ref.
30 July 2026	CM	(England) Rafiq Lamptey	(England) Chesterfield	End of Season	
1 August 2026	CB	(England) Kamarl Grant	(England) Bromley	End of Season	
4 August 2026	RW	(Guyana) Sheldon Kendall	(England) Gillingham	End of Season	
27 August 2026	RW	(England) Ra'ees Bangura-Williams	(England) Cambridge United	End of Season	
1 September 2026	CF	(England) Ajay Matthews	(England) Exeter City	End of Season	
25 September 2026	CM	(England) Alfie Massey	(England) Hornchurch	3 January 2027	
10 October 2026	GK	(England) Ronnie Sandford	(England) Dulwich Hamlet	7 November 2026	

=== Released / Out of Contract ===
Date	Pos.	Player	Subsequent club	Joined date	Ref.
30 June 2026	CF	(England) Frankie Baker	(England) Tonbridge Angels	1 July 2026	
30 June 2026	CB	(England) Jet Dyer	(England) Dagenham & Redbridge	1 July 2026	
30 June 2026	CB	(Jamaica) Wes Harding	(England) Plymouth Argyle	1 July 2026	
30 June 2026	LB	(England) Ben Drake	(England) Eastleigh	9 July 2026	
30 June 2026	CDM	(England) Billy Mitchell	(England) Sheffield Wednesday	19 July 2026	
30 June 2026	RB	(Republic of Ireland) Danny McNamara	(England) Charlton Athletic	23 July 2026	
30 June 2026	LB	(England) Joe Bryan			
30 June 2026	CF	(England) Jaiden Celestine-Charles			
30 June 2026	CB	(England) Kane Dixon			
30 June 2026	CB	(England) Dean Forbes			
30 June 2026	GK	(England) Caspar Lindner			
30 June 2026	GK	(England) Ronnie Sandford			
30 June 2026	CM	(England) Oliver Whitby			
30 June 2026	CB	(England) Harvey Whiteman			
30 June 2026	CF	(England) William Wright			

=== New Contract ===
Date	Pos.	Player	Contract until	Ref.
First team
15 May 2026	CM	(Belgium) Casper de Norre	30 June 2028	
15 May 2026	RB	(England) Ryan Leonard	30 June 2028	
8 July 2026	GK	(England) Joel Coleman	30 June 2027	
4 August 2026	CM	(Australia) Massimo Luongo	30 June 2027	
18 October 2026	LB	(England) Zak Sturge	Undisclosed	
Academy
3 July 2026	CB	(England) Freddie Freedman	Undisclosed	
3 July 2026	CM	(England) Archie Kirby	Undisclosed	
3 July 2026	GK	(England) Ronnie Sandford	Undisclosed	
3 July 2026	CM	(Turkey) Jayden Tektaş	Undisclosed	
3 July 2026	CM	(England) Jaydon Thomas-Smith	Undisclosed	
3 July 2026	CM	(Japan) Sacha Tsugita Vieira	Undisclosed	
4 September 2026	CB	(England) Lyndon Snelgrove	Undisclosed (Note: First professional contract)	

== Pre-season and friendlies ==
On 4 June, Millwall announced three pre-season friendlies against Gillingham, Bromley and Royal Antwerp. Fourteen days later, a training camp in Alicante along with two friendlies against Andorra and Eldense were confirmed. On 22 June, a visit to Stevenage was added.

Win Draw Loss Fixtures

14 July 2026 Friendly	Andorra	2–1	Millwall	San Pedro del Pinatar, Spain
11:00 CEST	Golubović 82'; Quintana 84'	Report	Servais 75'	Stadium: Pinatar Arena

17 July 2026 Friendly	Eldense	1–2	Millwall	Elda, Spain
18:30 CEST	Clemente (red card) 90+2'; Trialist 90+3'	Report	Arconte 8', (red card) 49'; Sykes 22'; De Norre (red card) 66'	Stadium: Estadio Nuevo Pepico Amat

21 July 2026 Friendly	Gillingham	1–0	Millwall	Gillingham
19:00 BST	Goodwin 16'; Gordon (yellow card) 57'	Report		Stadium: MEMS Priestfield Stadium

25 July 2026 Friendly	Stevenage	1–0	Millwall	Stevenage
15:00 BST	48'	Report		Stadium: SFC Stadium

28 July 2026 Friendly	Bromley	1−1	Millwall	Bromley
19:45 BST	Archer 43'		Servais 57'	Stadium: Hayes Lane

1 August 2026 Friendly	Millwall	1−0	Royal Antwerp	New Cross
15:00 BST	Cooper 69'	Report		Stadium: The Den

== Competitions ==
=== Overall record ===
Competition	First match	Last match	Starting round	Record							
Competition	First match	Last match	Starting round	Pld	W	D	L	GF	GA	GD	Win %
EFL Championship	15 August 2026	May 2027	Matchday 1	16	5	3	8	23	28	−5	31.25
FA Cup	January 2027	TBD	Third round	0	0	0	0	0	0	+0	—
EFL Cup	8 August 2026	8 September 2026	First round	3	1	1	1	2	2	+0	33.33
Total				19	6	4	9	25	30	−5	31.58

Last updated: 21 November 2026
Source: BBC Sport (league); EFL, EFL, BBC Sport (EFL Cup)

=== EFL Championship ===
==== League table ====
Pos	Team	Pld	W	D	L	GF	GA	GD	Pts
14	Wrexham	16	5	6	5	19	20	−1	21
15	Cardiff City	16	4	6	6	28	29	−1	18
16	Millwall	16	5	3	8	23	28	−5	18
17	Bolton Wanderers	16	5	3	8	21	30	−9	18
18	Bristol City	16	5	3	8	16	26	−10	18

Updated to match(es) played on 21 November 2026. Source: EFL Official Website
Rules for classification: 1) Points; 2) Goal difference; 3) Number of goals scored; 4) Head-to-head results; 5) Wins; 6) Away goals; 7) Penalty points (sec 9.5); 8) Number of 12-point sending off offences; 9) Play-off (only if needed to determine promotion/relegation)

==== Results summary ====
Overall								Home						Away					
Pld	W	D	L	GF	GA	GD	Pts	W	D	L	GF	GA	GD	W	D	L	GF	GA	GD
16	5	3	8	23	28	−5	18	3	2	3	15	10	+5	2	1	5	8	18	−10

Last updated: 21 November 2026.
Source: Soccerway

==== Results by round ====
Round	1	2	3	4	5	7	6^{1}	8	9	10	11	12	13	14	15	16	17	18	19	20	21	22	23	24	25	26	27	28	29	30	31
Ground	A	H	A	H	H	A	A	H	A	H	H	A	H	A	A	H	A	H	A	H	A	H	A	H	H	A	A	H	H	A	H
Result	W	W	L	L	W	L	D	D	W	L	D	L	W	L	L	L															
Position	2	1	6	10	7	13	11	11	8	11	12	13	12	14	16																
Points	3	6	6	6	9	9	10	11	14	14	15	15	18	18	18	18															

Source: EFL
A = Away; H = Home; W = Win; D = Draw; L = Loss; P = Postponed
Notes:
- ^{1} Matchday 6 (vs Middlesbrough) was moved due to EFL Cup involvements.

==== Matches ====
The Championship fixtures were released on 25 June 2026.

Win Draw Loss Fixtures

15 August 2026 1	Bristol City	0–2	Millwall	Bristol
15:00 BST	Randell (yellow card) 23' (yellow-red card) 36'	Report	Coburn (yellow card) 15', (goal) 41', 50'; Metcalfe (yellow card) 45'	Stadium: Ashton Gate; Attendance: 24,168 (2,018 away); Referee: Lewis Smith

22 August 2026 2	Millwall	3–0	Norwich City	Bermondsey
12:30 BST	Arconte 18', 58'; Metcalfe (yellow card) 40'; Cundle 84'	Report	Córdoba (yellow card) 25' (yellow-red card) 64'; Darling (yellow card) 37'	Stadium: The Den; Attendance: 19,564 (2,060 away); Referee: Sam Allison
Note: Fixture was initially scheduled for a 15:00 kick-off, but was moved for live Sky Sports broadcast.

29 August 2026 3	Southampton	5–1	Millwall	Southampton
15:00 BST	Manning (yellow card) 4'; Larin 25', 62'; Azaz 38'; Scienza 55' (pen.); Fellows 86', (yellow card) 87'	Report	Sykes (yellow card) 10', (goal) 15'	Stadium: St Mary's Stadium; Attendance: 29,167 (3,008 away); Referee: Adam Herczeg

2 September 2026 4	Millwall	0–3	Wrexham	Bermondsey
19:45 BST	De Norre (yellow card) 18'; Dykes (yellow card) 56'	Report	Sturge 28' (o.g.); Whiteman (yellow card) 36'; Moore 52'; Ekomié 69'	Stadium: The Den; Attendance: 17,840 (663 away); Referee: Oliver Langford

5 September 2026 5	Millwall	4–0	Bolton Wanderers	Bermondsey
15:00 BST	Taylor 38'; Dykes 83', 88'; Metcalfe (red card) 86'; Neghli 90+2'	Report	Famewo (yellow card) 75'; Sheehan (red card) 86'	Stadium: The Den; Attendance: 19,012 (2,029 away); Referee: Will Finnie

12 September 2026 7	Blackburn Rovers	3–1	Millwall	Blackburn
15:00 BST	Carter (yellow card) 13'; Morsy (yellow card) 38'; Afolayan 41', 58'; Pickering (yellow card) 45'; Beyuku (yellow card) 50'; Fevrier (yellow card) 86'; Guðjohnsen 90+3'	Report	Sturge (yellow card) 45+4'; Dykes 51' (pen.); Metcalfe (yellow card) 81'; Sykes (yellow card) 90+2'	Stadium: Ewood Park; Attendance: 12,330 (988 away); Referee: Josh Smith

15 September 2026 6	Middlesbrough	2–2	Millwall	Middlesbrough
19:45 BST	Cozier-Duberry 50'; Lankshear 61'; McGree (yellow card) 66'	Report	Arconte 11'; Dykes 36'; Mazou-Sacko (yellow card) 59'	Stadium: Riverside Stadium; Attendance: 27,684 (497 away); Referee: Bobby Madley
Note: Fixture was initially scheduled for 8 September, but was moved due to both clubs' participation in the EFL Cup third round.

19 September 2026 8	Millwall	2–2	West Ham United	Bermondsey
12:30 BST	Taylor 16'; Neghli 45+3'; Lisbie (yellow card) 90+6'	Report	Morato (yellow card) 40'; Kanté 74', (red card) 89'; Mavropanos 80', (yellow card) 90+5'; Pablo (yellow card) 83'; Kilman (yellow card) 86'	Stadium: The Den; Attendance: 19,639 (1,762 away); Referee: Paul Tierney
Note: Fixture was initially scheduled for a 15:00 kick-off, but was moved for live Sky Sports broadcast.

10 October 2026 9	Preston North End	0–1	Millwall	Preston
15:00 BST	Leroy (yellow card) 15'	Report	Metcalfe (yellow card) 19'; Mazou-Sacko (yellow card) 71'; Neghli 79'	Stadium: Deepdale; Attendance: 17,602 (2,096 away); Referee: Ben Speedie

13 October 2026 10	Millwall	0–1	Swansea City	Bermondsey
19:45 BST	Mazou-Sacko (yellow card) 23'; Dykes (yellow card) 44'; Sturge (yellow card) 51'	Report	Fulton (yellow card) 15'; Lissah (yellow card) 83'; Ronald 90'	Stadium: The Den; Attendance: 18,807 (1,398 away); Referee: Edward Duckworth

17 October 2026 11	Millwall	2–2	Lincoln City	Bermondsey
12:30 BST	Crama (yellow card) 35'; Cooper (yellow card) 48', (goal) 82'; Lisbie 63', (yellow card) 72'; Sturge (yellow card) 86'; Leonard (yellow card) 90+1'; Neghli (yellow card) 90+2'	Report	Coubiș 1', (yellow card) 69'; Street 33', (yellow card) 35'; Draper (yellow card) 41'; Elerewe (red card) 84'; Elder (yellow card) 90+1'	Stadium: The Den; Attendance: 19,834 (2,068 away); Referee: Ruebyn Ricardo
Note: Fixture was initially scheduled for a 15:00 kick-off, but was brought forward for live Sky Sports broadcasting.

24 October 2026 12	Portsmouth	2–1	Millwall	Portsmouth
12:30 BST	Dykes 16' (o.g.); Milovanović (yellow card) 71'; Waddingham 82'; Swanson (yellow card) 90+4'	Report	Metcalfe 6'; Crama (yellow card) 24'; Cooper (yellow card) 45'	Stadium: Fratton Park; Attendance: 20,476 (2,197 away); Referee: Tom Reeves
Note: Fixture was initially scheduled for a 15:00 kick-off, but was brought forward for live Sky Sports broadcasting.

31 October 2026 13	Millwall	4–1	Derby County	Bermondsey
15:00 GMT	Lisbie 3', 10'; Cundle 17'; Dykes (yellow card) 24'; Mazou-Sacko (yellow card) 32'; Cooper 84'; Metcalfe (yellow card) 89'	Report	Brewster (yellow card) 45+1'; Morris (yellow card) 71'; Bilbija 87'	Stadium: The Den; Attendance: 19,762 (2,065 away); Referee: John Busby

3 November 2026 14	Birmingham City	3–0	Millwall	Birmingham
19:45 GMT	Cochrane 1', (yellow card) 56'; Bird 16'; Stansfield 29'	Report	Osei-Tutu (yellow card) 55'	Stadium: St Andrew's @ Knighthead Park; Attendance: 25,044 (896 away); Referee: David Webb

7 November 2026 15	West Bromwich Albion	3–0	Millwall	West Bromwich
15:00 GMT	Price 50'; Pereira (yellow card) 52'; Molumby 78'; Myhre 89'	Report	Mazou-Sacko (yellow card) 43'; Sturge (yellow card) 64'	Stadium: The Hawthorns; Attendance: 24,402 (2,017 away); Referee: Thomas Bramall

21 November 2026 16	Millwall	0–1	Queens Park Rangers	Bermondsey
12:30 GMT	Sturge (red card) 15'; Taylor (yellow card) 53'; Neghli (yellow card) 61'; Osei-Tutu (yellow card) 71'; Cooper (yellow card) 86'	Report	Adamson (yellow card) 21'; Madsen 45+1'	Stadium: The Den; Attendance: 19,984 (2,062 away); Referee: Josh Smith
Note: Fixture was initially scheduled for a 15:00 kick-off, but was brought forward for live Sky Sports broadcasting.

25 November 2026 17	Stoke City	v	Millwall	Stoke-on-Trent
20:00 GMT				Stadium: bet365 Stadium
Note: Fixture was initially scheduled for a 19:45 kick-off, but was pushed back for live Sky Sports broadcasting.

28 November 2026 18	Millwall	v	Burnley	Bermondsey
15:00 GMT				Stadium: The Den

5 December 2026 19	Watford	v	Millwall	Watford
12:30 GMT				Stadium: Vicarage Road
Note: Fixture was initially scheduled for a 15:00 kick-off, but was brought forward for live Sky Sports broadcasting.

8 December 2026 20	Millwall	v	Sheffield United	Bermondsey
19:45 GMT				Stadium: The Den

12 December 2026 21	Wolverhampton Wanderers	v	Millwall	Wolverhampton
15:00 GMT				Stadium: Molineux Stadium

19 December 2026 22	Millwall	v	Charlton Athletic	Bermondsey
12:30 GMT				Stadium: The Den
Note: Fixture was initially scheduled for a 15:00 kick-off, but was brought forward following advice from local police.

26 December 2026 23	Cardiff City	v	Millwall	Leckwith
15:00 GMT				Stadium: Cardiff City Stadium

29 December 2026 24	Millwall	v	Portsmouth	Bermondsey
19:45 GMT				Stadium: The Den

1 January 2027 25	Millwall	v	Wolverhampton Wanderers	Bermondsey
12:30 GMT				Stadium: The Den
Note: Fixture was initially scheduled for a 15:00 kick-off, but was brought forward for live Sky Sports broadcasting.

16 January 2027 26	Lincoln City	v	Millwall	Lincoln
15:00 GMT				Stadium: ProAmpac Stadium

23 January 2027 27	Derby County	v	Millwall	Derby
15:00 GMT				Stadium: Pride Park Stadium

26 January 2027 28	Millwall	v	Birmingham City	Bermondsey
19:45 GMT				Stadium: The Den

30 January 2027 29	Millwall	v	West Bromwich Albion	Bermondsey
15:00 GMT				Stadium: The Den

6 February 2027 30	Queens Park Rangers	v	West Bromwich Albion	Shepherd's Bush
15:00 GMT				Stadium: MATRADE Loftus Road

13 February 2027 31	Millwall	v	Blackburn Rovers	Bermondsey
12:30 GMT				Stadium: The Den
Note: Fixture was initially scheduled for a 15:00 kick-off, but was brought forward for live Sky Sports broadcasting.

=== FA Cup ===
As a Championship side, Millwall will enter the FA Cup in the third round.

Win Draw Loss Fixtures

January 2027 Third round	TBD	v	TBD	TBD
15:00 GMT		Report		Stadium: TBD

=== EFL Cup ===
Millwall were drawn away to Queens Park Rangers in the first round, to Cambridge United in the second round and then home to Newcastle United in the third round. In the 0–1 home defeat to Newcastle on 8 September, Regan Anderson came on as a substitute aged 15 years, 9 months and 28 days, becoming Millwall's second-youngest player behind Moses Ashikodi.

Win Draw Loss Fixtures

8 August 2026 First round	Queens Park Rangers	1–1 (0–2 p)	Millwall	Shepherd's Bush
14:00 BST	Sykes 86' (o.g.)	Report	Cundle 53'	Stadium: Loftus Road; Attendance: 9,759 (1,760 away); Referee: Matt Donohue
	Penalties
	Chair (penalty missed); Vale (penalty missed); Saitō (penalty missed); Poku (penalty missed)		(penalty scored) Cooper; (penalty scored) Sykes; (penalty missed) Neghli; (penalty missed) Arconte

25 August 2026 Second round	Cambridge United	0–1	Millwall	Cambridge
19:45 BST	Bauer (yellow card) 50'; McConnell (yellow card) 87'	Report	Cooper 9'	Stadium: Abbey Stadium; Attendance: 5,363 (1,423 away); Referee: Paul Howard

8 September 2026 Third round	Millwall	0–1	Newcastle United	Bermondsey
20:00 BST	Metcalfe (yellow card) 67'; Massey (yellow card) 90+1'	Report	Ramsey (yellow card) 69'; Willock 81'	Stadium: The Den; Attendance: 14,698 (2,065 away); Referee: Craig Pawson

== Statistics ==
=== Appearances and goals ===
As of match played 7 November 2026

Players with no appearances are not included on the list; italics indicate loaned in player

No.	Pos	Nat	Player	Total		Championship		FA Cup		EFL Cup	
No.	Pos	Nat	Player	Apps	Goals	Apps	Goals	Apps	Goals	Apps	Goals
1	GK	(Denmark) DEN	Lukas Jensen	3	0	2+0	0	0+0	0	1+0	0
2	DF	(England) ENG	Jordi Osei-Tutu	11	0	7+2	0	0+0	0	2+0	0
3	DF	(England) ENG	Zak Sturge	17	0	15+0	0	0+0	0	1+1	0
4	DF	(France) FRA	Tristan Crama	5	0	3+2	0	0+0	0	0+0	0
5	DF	(England) ENG	Jake Cooper	18	3	15+0	2	0+0	0	3+0	1
6	DF	(England) ENG	Caleb Taylor	17	2	15+0	2	0+0	0	2+0	0
7	FW	(Guadeloupe) GLP	Taïryk Arconte	11	3	8+1	3	0+0	0	0+2	0
8	MF	(Belgium) BEL	Mathis Servais	1	0	0+1	0	0+0	0	0+0	0
9	FW	(Serbia) SRB	Mihailo Ivanović	3	0	1+2	0	0+0	0	0+0	0
10	FW	(Algeria) ALG	Camiel Neghli	18	3	14+1	3	0+0	0	2+1	0
11	FW	(England) ENG	Romain Esse	8	0	2+5	0	0+0	0	1+0	0
12	DF	(Indonesia) IDN	Elkan Baggott	8	0	1+5	0	0+0	0	2+0	0
13	FW	(Scotland) SCO	Lyndon Dykes	17	4	11+4	4	0+0	0	2+0	0
14	MF	(England) ENG	Jenson Metcalfe	17	1	14+0	1	0+0	0	2+1	0
15	GK	(New Zealand) NZL	Max Crocombe	11	0	9+1	0	0+0	0	1+0	0
16	MF	(Scotland) SCO	Daniel Kelly	13	0	1+9	0	0+0	0	2+1	0
17	MF	(Republic of Ireland) IRL	Mark Sykes	15	1	7+6	1	0+0	0	0+2	0
18	DF	(England) ENG	Ryan Leonard	6	0	2+3	0	0+0	0	1+0	0
19	FW	(England) ENG	Josh Coburn	7	2	5+1	2	0+0	0	1+0	0
22	FW	(England) ENG	Kyrell Lisbie	12	3	9+2	3	0+0	0	0+1	0
23	DF	(England) ENG	Danny Batth	1	0	0+0	0	0+0	0	1+0	0
24	MF	(Belgium) BEL	Casper De Norre	5	0	4+0	0	0+0	0	1+0	0
25	MF	(England) ENG	Luke Cundle	14	3	4+8	2	0+0	0	2+0	1
28	FW	(England) ENG	Ajay Matthews	1	0	0+0	0	0+0	0	0+1	0
29	FW	(England) ENG	Zak Lovelace	9	0	0+7	0	0+0	0	2+0	0
31	FW	(England) ENG	Raees Bangura-Williams	2	0	0+0	0	0+0	0	1+1	0
34	GK	(England) ENG	Filip Marschall	5	0	4+0	0	0+0	0	1+0	0
35	FW	(France) FRA	Yanis Issoufou	6	0	0+5	0	0+0	0	0+1	0
44	MF	(England) ENG	Alfie Massey	3	0	0+1	0	0+0	0	1+1	0
45	DF	(England) ENG	Alfie Doughty	4	0	0+4	0	0+0	0	0+0	0
49	MF	(France) FRA	Derek Mazou-Sacko	12	0	11+1	0	0+0	0	0+0	0
55	DF	(England) ENG	Tristan Parkes	1	0	0+0	0	0+0	0	0+1	0
57	FW	(England) ENG	Regan Anderson	1	0	0+0	0	0+0	0	0+1	0
Players who featured but departed the club permanently during the season:
11	FW	(Nigeria) NGR	Femi Azeez	2	0	1+0	0	0+0	0	1+0	0

=== Disciplinary record ===
As of match played 7 November 2026

Rank	No.	Pos.	Player	Championship			FA Cup			EFL Cup			Total		
Rank	No.	Pos.	Player	Yellow card	(yellow card) (yellow-red card)	Red card	Yellow card	(yellow card) (yellow-red card)	Red card	Yellow card	(yellow card) (yellow-red card)	Red card	Yellow card	(yellow card) (yellow-red card)	Red card
1	14	CM	(England) Jenson Metcalfe	5	0	1	0	0	0	1	0	0	6	0	1
2	49	CM	(France) Derek Mazou-Sacko	5	0	0	0	0	0	0	0	0	5	0	0
3	3	LB	(England) Zak Sturge	4	0	0	0	0	0	0	0	0	4	0	0
4	13	CF	(Scotland) Lyndon Dykes	3	0	0	0	0	0	0	0	0	3	0	0
5	4	CB	(France) Tristan Crama	2	0	0	0	0	0	0	0	0	2	0	0
5	17	RM	(Republic of Ireland) Mark Sykes	2	0	0	0	0	0	0	0	0	2	0	0
5	22	LW	(England) Kyrell Lisbie	2	0	0	0	0	0	0	0	0	2	0	0
8	2	RB	(England) Jordi Osei-Tutu	1	0	0	0	0	0	0	0	0	1	0	0
8	5	CB	(England) Jake Cooper	1	0	0	0	0	0	0	0	0	1	0	0
8	10	RW	(Algeria) Camiel Neghli	1	0	0	0	0	0	0	0	0	1	0	0
8	14	CM	(England) Jenson Metcalfe	1	0	0	0	0	0	0	0	0	1	0	0
8	18	RB	(England) Ryan Leonard	1	0	0	0	0	0	0	0	0	1	0	0
8	19	CF	(England) Josh Coburn	1	0	0	0	0	0	0	0	0	1	0	0
8	24	CDM	(Belgium) Casper De Norre	1	0	0	0	0	0	0	0	0	1	0	0
8	44	CM	(England) Alfie Massey	0	0	0	0	0	0	1	0	0	1	0	0
Total				30	0	1	0	0	0	2	0	0	32	0	1

== Awards ==
=== Player Awards ===
==== EFL Championship Player of the Month ====
Month	Player	Result	Ref.
September	(Scotland) Lyndon Dykes	Nominated	
