= Lisbie =

Lisbie is a surname. Notable people with the surname include:

- Kevin Lisbie (born 1978), British football striker and football manager;
- Kyreece Lisbie (born 2003), English football winger and forward;
- Kyrell Lisbie (born 2003), English football left-winger.
