= 2025–26 Millwall F.C. season =

English football club season

Millwall
2025–26 season
- Chairman: James Berylson
- Head coach: Alex Neil
- Stadium: The Den
- Championship: 3rd (Play-offs)
- FA Cup: Third round
- EFL Cup: Third round
- Top goalscorer: League: Femi Azeez (11); All: Femi Azeez (11)
- Highest home attendance: 19,004 v Charlton Athletic
- Lowest home attendance: 13,792 v Stoke City
- Average home league attendance: 17,135
- Biggest win: 4–0 v Charlton Athletic
- Biggest defeat: 4–0 v Coventry City & Birmingham City
Home colours	Away colours	Third colours

The 2025–26 season was the 141st season in the history of Millwall Football Club, their 49th season in the Second Tier of English football, and their ninth consecutive season in the Championship. In addition to the domestic league, the club also participated in the FA Cup and the EFL Cup.

This season saw Millwall finish with their highest ever points total in the second tier of English Football, with 83 points, surpassing their 82 points in the 1987–88 season. The Lions away record of 41 points was the best in the Championship this season, and their best ever in the second tier. The team also kept a league best 18 clean-sheets. The season saw the club's largest-ever Football League attendance at The Den, as 19,004 spectators watched them play Charlton Athletic in January 2026. The average home attendance of 17,135 was the highest since the 1952–53 season.

Millwall reached the EFL Championship play-offs for the fourth time, and the ninth appearance in the EFL playoffs at all levels. The Lions lost 2–0 to Hull City in the semi-finals. In his tenth year with Millwall, club captain Jake Cooper made his 400th appearance, only the sixth player in Millwall's history to reach that mark, and during the season he overtook Alan McLeary and Neil Harris to reach fourth place on Millwall's all-time appearance list.

== Current squad ==
As of 1 September 2025

Note: Flags indicate national team as has been defined under FIFA eligibility rules. Players may hold more than one non-FIFA nationality.

Note: Appearances and goals are for all competitions, taken at the start of the season.

No.	Nationality	Name	Position	Place of Birth	Date of birth (age)	Apps.	Goals	Signed from	Date Signed	Transfer Fee	Contract end
Goalkeepers
1	(Denmark)	Lukas Jensen	GK	Helsingør	18 March 1999 (age 27)	43	0	(England) Lincoln City	11 July 2024	Undisclosed	30 June 2027
13	(Germany)	Steven Benda	GK	Stuttgart	1 October 1998 (age 28)	0	0	(England) Fulham	25 July 2025	Loan	30 June 2026
15	(New Zealand)	Max Crocombe	GK	Auckland	12 August 1993 (age 33)	0	0	(England) Burton	24 June 2025	Free Transfer	30 June 2027
41	(England)	George Evans	GK	London	16 May 2005 (age 21)	4	0	Academy	1 July 2024	Trainee	30 June 2028
Defenders
2	(Republic of Ireland)	Danny McNamara	RB	Sidcup	27 December 1998 (age 27)	153	2	Academy	1 July 2017	Trainee	30 June 2028
3	(England)	Zak Sturge	LB	Hillingdon	15 June 2004 (age 22)	5	0	(England) Chelsea	14 July 2025	Undisclosed	30 June 2028
4	(France)	Tristan Crama	CB	Béziers	8 November 2001 (age 25)	20	0	(England) Brentford	17 January 2025	Undisclosed	30 June 2028
5	(England)	Jake Cooper (Captain)	CB	Burnley	3 February 1995 (age 31)	386	29	(England) Reading	1 July 2017	Undisclosed (Reported £500k)	30 June 2026
6	(England)	Caleb Taylor	CB	Bracknell	14 January 2003 (age 23)	0	0	(England) West Brom	29 Aug 2025	Undisclosed (Reported £2,5m)	30 June 2029
18	(England)	Ryan Leonard (Vice-Captain)	CM/CDM/CB/RB	Plympton	24 May 1992 (age 34)	201	5	(England) Sheffield United	2 January 2019	£1.5m	30 June 2027
23	(England)	Joe Bryan	LB	Bristol	17 September 1993 (age 33)	69	3	(England) Fulham	1 July 2023	Free Transfer	30 June 2027
27	(England)	Kamarl Grant	CB	London	26 January 2003 (age 23)	0	0	(England) Sheffield United	1 July 2022	Undisclosed	30 June 2028
45	(Jamaica)	Wes Harding	RB/CB	Leicester	20 October 1996 (age 30)	34	4	(England) Rotherham United	21 July 2023	Free Transfer	30 June 2027
Midfielders
8	(England)	Billy Mitchell	CM/CDM	Orpington	7 April 2001 (age 25)	166	1	Academy	1 July 2019	Trainee	30 June 2028
10	(Algeria)	Camiel Neghli	LW/RW	Ede	6 November 2001 (age 25)	6	1	(Netherlands) Sparta Rotterdam	31 January 2025	Undisclosed (Reported £3m)	30 June 2028
14	(England)	Alfie Doughty	LWB/LW	London	21 December 1999 (age 26)	0	0	(England) Luton Town	28 July 2025	Undisclosed	30 July 2028
16	(Scotland)	Daniel Kelly	CM	East Renfrewshire	3 October 2005 (age 21)	4	0	(Scotland) Celtic	23 August 2024	Undisclosed (Reported £400k)	30 June 2027
21	(Australia)	Massimo Luongo	CM	Sydney	25 September 1992 (age 34)	0	0	(England) Ipswich Town	25 July 2025	Free	30 July 2027
24	(Belgium)	Casper de Norre	CM	Hasselt	7 February 1997 (age 29)	83	5	(Belgium) Oud-Heverlee Leuven	21 July 2023	Undisclosed (Reported £3.4m)	30 June 2027
25	(England)	Luke Cundle	CAM	Warrington	26 April 2002 (age 24)	18	1	(England) Wolverhampton Wanderers	31 January 2025	Undisclosed (Reported £1m)	30 June 2028
26	(England)	Benicio Baker	LW/RW	Hammersmith	9 January 2004 (age 22)	0	0	(England) Brighton & Hove Albion	3 February 2025	Undisclosed	30 June 2028
31	(England)	Raees Bangura-Williams	LW/RW	Lambeth	2 July 2004 (age 22)	13	1	(England) Tooting & Mitcham United	31 December 2023	Undisclosed	30 June 2027
39	(Republic of Ireland)	Will Smallbone	CM	Basingstoke	21 February 2000 (age 26)	0	0	(England) Southampton	1 September 2025	Loan	30 June 2026
49	(France)	Derek Mazou-Sacko	CM	Sarcelles	6 October 2004 (age 22)	0	0	(France) Troyes	31 August 2025	Undisclosed	30 June 2029
Forwards
7	(Austria)	Thierno Ballo	LW/RW	Abidjan	2 January 2002 (age 24)	0	0	(Austria) Wolfsberger AC	1 September 2025	Loan	30 June 2026
9	(Serbia)	Mihailo Ivanović	CF	Novi Sad	29 November 2004 (age 21)	40	13	(Serbia) Vojvodina	30 August 2024	Undisclosed (Reported £2.8m)	30 June 2027
11	(Nigeria)	Femi Azeez	FW	Westminster	5 June 2001 (age 25)	38	4	(England) Reading	1 August 2024	Undisclosed	30 June 2027
12	(England)	Adam Mayor	LW/RW	Liverpool	10 April 2005 (age 21)	5	0	(England) Morecambe	31 January 2024	Undisclosed (Reported £300k)	30 June 2027
17	(England)	Macaulay Langstaff	CF	Stockton-on-Tees	3 February 1997 (age 29)	36	1	(England) Notts County	8 July 2024	Undisclosed (Reported £700k)	30 June 2027
19	(England)	Josh Coburn	CF	Bedale	6 December 2002 (age 23)	21	5	(England) Middlesbrough	26 June 2025	Undisclosed (Reported £5m)	30 June 2028
22	(Republic of Ireland)	Aidomo Emakhu	LW/RW	Bawnogue	26 October 2003 (age 23)	51	1	(Republic of Ireland) Shamrock Rovers	1 July 2022	Undisclosed	30 June 2028
28	(England)	Ajay Matthews	LW/RW	Middlesbrough	11 June 2006 (age 20)	0	0	(England) Middlesbrough	30 January 2025	Undisclosed	30 June 2028
29	(England)	Zak Lovelace	CF	Wandsworth	23 January 2006 (age 20)	4	0	(Scotland) Rangers	3 February 2025	Undisclosed	30 June 2028
Out on Loan

== Transfers ==
=== In ===
Date	Pos.	Player	From	Fee	Ref.
24 June 2025	GK	(New Zealand) Max Crocombe	(England) Burton Albion	Free	
26 June 2025	CF	(England) Josh Coburn	(England) Middlesbrough	£5,000,000	
14 July 2025	LB	(England) Zak Sturge	(England) Chelsea	Undisclosed	
25 July 2025	CM	(Australia) Massimo Luongo	(England) Ipswich Town	Free	
28 July 2025	LWB	(England) Alfie Doughty	(England) Luton Town	Undisclosed	
28 August 2025	GK	(England) Joel Coleman	(England) Bolton Wanderers	Free	
29 August 2025	CB	(England) Caleb Taylor	(England) West Bromwich Albion	Undisclosed	
31 August 2025	CM	(France) Derek Mazou-Sacko	(France) Rodez	Undisclosed	
28 November 2025	CF	(Grenada) Caleb Redhead	(England) Crystal Palace	Free	
28 January 2026	CM	(Scotland) Barry Bannan	(England) Sheffield Wednesday	Undisclosed	

=== Out ===
Date	Pos.	Player	To	Fee	Ref.
1 June 2025 (Note: The transfer was announced on 20 May, and would become official on 1 June once the transfer window had reopened)	CAM	(Netherlands) Zian Flemming	(England) Burnley	£7,000,000	
28 August 2025	CB	(England) Japhet Tanganga	(England) Sheffield United	£7,500,000	
1 September 2025	CF	(Scotland) Kevin Nisbet	(Scotland) Aberdeen	£300,000	
3 February 2026	LW	(Republic of Ireland) Aidomo Emakhu	(England) Oxford United	Undisclosed	

Income: ▲ ~ £14,800,000

=== Loaned in ===
Date	Pos.	Player	From	Date until	Ref.
25 July 2025	GK	(Germany) Steven Benda	(England) Fulham	12 January 2026 (Note: On 12 January, Benda's initial season-long loan from Fulham was terminated)	
1 September 2025	LW	(Austria) Thierno Ballo	(Austria) Wolfsberger AC	31 May 2026	
1 September 2025	CM	(Republic of Ireland) Will Smallbone	(England) Southampton	31 May 2026	
1 February 2026	GK	(England) Anthony Patterson	(England) Sunderland	31 May 2026	
1 February 2026	LW	(England) Tom Watson	(England) Brighton & Hove Albion	31 May 2026	

=== Loaned out ===
Date	Pos.	Player	To	Date until	Ref.
12 August 2025	CM	(England) Alfie Massey	(England) Wealdstone	3 January 2026	
1 September 2025	LB	(England) Adam Mayor	(England) Cambridge United	31 May 2026	
3 October 2025	GK	(England) George Evans	(England) Hartlepool United	12 January 2026 (Note: On 6 November, Evans' loan at Hartlepool was extended until January. Then on 6 January the loan was extended again for a further month but was recalled just six days later)	
22 December 2025	LB	(England) Ben Drake	(England) Braintree Town	25 April 2026 (Note: On 17 January, Drake's loan at Braintree Town was extended until the end of the regular National League season)	
3 January 2026	CF	(England) Frankie Baker	(England) Tonbridge Angels	31 January 2026	
3 January 2026	CF	(England) Jaiden Celestine-Charles	(England) Maidenhead United	31 January 2026	
14 January 2026	CB	(England) Kamarl Grant	(England) Blackpool	31 May 2026	
16 January 2026	CF	(England) Ajay Matthews	(England) Leyton Orient	31 May 2026	
2 February 2026	CB	(Jamaica) Wes Harding	(England) Plymouth Argyle	31 May 2026	
3 February 2026	RW	(England) Jack Howland	(England) Barnet	31 May 2026	
20 March 2026	CM	(England) Alfie Massey	(England) Southend United	31 May 2026	
24 March 2026	CB	(England) Jet Dyer	(England) Hemel Hempstead Town	31 May 2026	
27 March 2026	CF	(England) Jaiden Celestine-Charles	(England) Slough Town	31 May 2026	

=== Released / Out of Contract ===
Date	Pos.	Player	Subsequent club	Join date	Ref.
30 June 2025	RB	(England) Oliver Evans	(England) Chatham Town	1 July 2025	
30 June 2025	CF	(England) Henry Hearn	(England) Hornchurch	1 July 2025	
30 June 2025	CM	(England) George Honeyman	(England) Blackpool	1 July 2025	
30 June 2025	CF	(England) Tom Leahy	(England) Welling United	1 July 2025	
30 June 2025	CB	(England) Chinwike Okoli	(England) Woking	1 July 2025	
30 June 2025	CM	(Albania) Elidon O'Boyle	(England) Fleetwood Town	1 July 2025	
30 June 2025	GK	(England) Liam Roberts	(England) Mansfield Town	1 July 2025	
30 June 2025	CM	(Northern Ireland) George Saville	(England) Luton Town	1 July 2025	
30 June 2025	LB	(Scotland) Murray Wallace	(England) Huddersfield Town	1 July 2025	
30 June 2025	GK	(United States) Ethan Wady	Retired		
30 June 2025	CF	(Republic of Ireland) Aaron Connolly	(England) Leyton Orient	7 July 2025	
30 June 2025	GK	(England) Dillon Addai	(England) Bromley	25 July 2025	
30 June 2025	CM	(England) Sha'mar Lawson	(England) Ramsgate	12 August 2025	
30 June 2025	LB	(England) Nino Adom-Malaki	(England) Enfield Town	15 August 2025	
30 June 2025	RB	(England) Kyle Smith	(England) Braintree Town	20 August 2025	
30 June 2025	CF	(England) Abdulahi Abdulazeez	(England) A.F.C. Greenwich Borough	September 2025	
30 June 2025	RW	(England) Duncan Watmore	(England) Rotherham United	2 February 2026	
30 June 2025	CF	(England) Kavalli Heywood	(England) Carshalton Athletic	3 April 2026	
30 June 2025	CB	(England) Shaun Hutchinson			

=== New Contract ===
Date	Pos.	Player	Contract until	Ref.
First team
24 June 2025	RB	(Republic of Ireland) Danny McNamara	Undisclosed	
2 July 2025	GK	(England) George Evans	Undisclosed	
31 July 2025	CB	(England) Kamarl Grant	Undisclosed	
30 September 2025	CF	(Serbia) Mihailo Ivanović	Undisclosed	
2 January 2026	CB	(England) Jake Cooper	30 June 2027	
Academy
8 August 2025	CM	(England) George Beaumont	Undisclosed (Note: First professional contract)	
8 August 2025	CB	(England) Dean Forbes	Undisclosed	
8 August 2025	CM	(Afghanistan) Elias Mansor	Undisclosed	
8 August 2025	CB	(England) Harry Taylor	Undisclosed	
8 August 2025	CM	(England) Oliver Whitby	Undisclosed	
17 September 2025	CM	(England) Rafiq Lamptey	Undisclosed	
3 December 2025	RW	(England) Jack Howland	Undisclosed	
16 January 2026	RW	(Guyana) Sheldon Kendall	Undisclosed	

== Pre-season and friendlies ==
On 16 May, Millwall confirmed their first pre-season friendly, against Bromley. A fortnight later, a second fixture was confirmed to be against Sutton United. A training camp in Murcia was later added, with two fixtures against Northampton Town and a TBC opponent. On 10 June, a fifth friendly was announced, against AFC Wimbledon. A behind closed doors fixture against Crystal Palace was later added. On 8 July, Elche was confirmed as the second opposition during the training camp. Three days, a home fixture against Estoril Praia was announced.

Win Draw Loss Fixtures

12 July 2025 Friendly	Crystal Palace	1–0	Millwall	Beckenham
12:00 CEST	Rak-Sakyi 50'	Report		Stadium: Crystal Palace Training Ground; Attendance: 0 (behind closed doors)

15 July 2025 Friendly	Millwall	3–0	Northampton Town	San Pedro del Pinatar, Spain
19:00 CEST	Ivanović 4'; Cundle 39'; Coburn 78'	Report		Stadium: Pinatar Arena

18 July 2025 Friendly	Elche	2–1	Millwall	San Pedro del Pinatar, Spain
10:30 CEST	Houary 67'; Traoré 87'	Report	Cundle 62'	Stadium: Pinatar Arena

22 July 2025 Friendly	AFC Wimbledon	0–3	Millwall	Wimbledon
19:30 BST		Report	Azeez 6'; Howland 39'; Ivanović 56'	Stadium: Plough Lane

26 July 2025 Friendly	Bromley	1–2	Millwall	Bromley
15:00 BST	Odutayo 90+2'	Report	Bangura-Williams 49'; Ivanović 60'	Stadium: Hayes Lane

29 July 2025 Friendly	Sutton United	2–6	Millwall	Sutton
19:45 BST	Nadesan 25', 60'	Report	Langstaff 13', 17', 23'; Emakhu 50', 72'; Coburn 83'	Stadium: Gander Green Lane

2 August 2025 Friendly	Millwall	3–0	Estoril Praia	Bermondsey
13:00 BST	Ivanović 10'; Coburn 34', 41'	Report		Stadium: The Den

== Competitions ==
=== Overall record ===
Competition	Starting round	Final position	Record							
Competition	Starting round	Final position	Pld	W	D	L	GF	GA	GD	Win %
EFL Championship	Matchday 1		46	24	11	11	64	49	+15	52.17
FA Cup	Third round	Third round	1	0	0	1	1	5	−4	0.00
EFL Cup	First round	Third round	3	2	1	0	4	2	+2	66.67
Total			50	26	12	12	69	56	+13	52.00

Last updated: 2 May 2026
Source: Soccerway

=== Championship ===
==== League table ====
Pos	Team	Pld	W	D	L	GF	GA	GD	Pts	Promotion, qualification or relegation
1	Coventry City (C, P)	46	28	11	7	97	45	+52	95	Promotion to the Premier League
2	Ipswich Town (P)	46	23	15	8	80	47	+33	84	Promotion to the Premier League
3	Millwall	46	24	11	11	64	49	+15	83	Qualification for the Championship play-offs
4	Southampton (Note: Southampton qualified for the play-offs and defeated Middlesbrough to qualify for the final, but were subsequently disqualified for multiple breaches of EFL regulations related to the unauthorised filming of other clubs' training, with Middlesbrough taking their place in the play-off final.) (D)	46	22	14	10	82	56	+26	80	Qualification for the Championship play-offs
5	Middlesbrough	46	22	14	10	72	47	+25	80	Qualification for the Championship play-offs

Source: EFL Official Website
Rules for classification: 1) Points; 2) Goal difference; 3) Number of goals scored; 4) Head-to-head results; 5) Wins; 6) Away goals; 7) Penalty points (sec 9.5); 8) Number of 12-point sending off offences; 9) Play-off (only if needed to determine promotion/relegation)
(C) Champions; (D) Disqualified; (P) Promoted

==== Results summary ====
Overall								Home						Away					
Pld	W	D	L	GF	GA	GD	Pts	W	D	L	GF	GA	GD	W	D	L	GF	GA	GD
46	24	11	11	64	49	+15	83	13	3	7	33	25	+8	11	8	4	31	24	+7

Last updated: 2 May 2026.
Source: Soccerway

==== Results by round ====
Round	1	2	3	4	5	6	7	8	9	10	11	12	13	14	15	16	17	18	19	20	21	22	23	24	25	26	27	28	29	30	31	32	33	34	35	36	37	38	39	40	41	42	43	44	45	46
Ground	A	H	A	H	A	H	A	H	H	A	H	H	A	A	H	A	H	H	A	A	H	A	H	H	A	H	A	A	H	H	A	A	H	H	A	A	H	H	A	A	H	A	H	A	A	H
Result	W	L	W	L	D	W	D	L	W	W	W	W	D	L	D	L	W	W	W	D	L	L	D	W	D	W	W	L	W	D	W	W	L	W	W	W	W	L	D	W	L	D	W	W	D	W
Position	3	16	8	12	13	10	10	12	8	6	3	3	4	5	6	7	4	3	3	3	4	6	7	5	7	5	4	5	5	5	5	3	3	3	3	3	3	4	4	2	4	3	3	3	3	3

Source: EFL
A = Away; H = Home; W = Win; D = Draw; L = Loss; P = Postponed

==== Matches ====
The league fixtures were released on 26 June 2025.

Win Draw Loss Fixtures

9 August 2025 1	Norwich City	1–2	Millwall	Norwich
15:00 BST	Sargent 55'; Wright (yellow card) 89'	Report	Tanganga (yellow card) 35'; Cooper (yellow card) 40'; Neghli 51'; Langstaff 83'; Mitchell (yellow card) 87'; Crama (yellow card) 90+7'	Stadium: Carrow Road; Attendance: 26,546; Referee: Adam Herczeg

16 August 2025 2	Millwall	0–3	Middlesbrough	Bermondsey
15:00 BST	Crama (yellow card) 27'; Coburn (yellow card) 32'; Mitchell (yellow card) 38'; Sturge (yellow card) 70'	Report	Conway (yellow card) 42'; Hackney 49'; Whittaker (yellow card) 59'; Silvera (yellow card) 68'; Jones 87'; Edmundson (yellow card) 89'; Burgzorg (yellow card) 90+5', (goal) 90+7'	Stadium: The Den; Attendance: 18,021; Referee: Tom Nield

23 August 2025 3	Sheffield United	0–1	Millwall	Sheffield
15:00 BST	Robinson (yellow card) 46'; Hamer (yellow card) 63'; Barry (yellow card) 79'; Campbell (yellow card) 79'; Peck (yellow card) 90+2'	Report	Cundle 38'; Luongo (yellow card) 41'; Neghli (yellow card) 59'	Stadium: Bramall Lane; Attendance: 26,835; Referee: John Busby

30 August 2025 4	Millwall	0–2	Wrexham	Bermondsey
15:00 BST	Bangura-Williams (yellow card) 82'	Report	Moore 58', (yellow card) 90+18'; Doyle (yellow card) 64'; O'Brien 90+18', (yellow card) 90+20'	Stadium: The Den; Attendance: 17,877; Referee: Thomas Kirk

13 September 2025 5	Charlton Athletic	1–1	Millwall	Charlton
12:30 BST	Carey 40'; Ramsay (yellow card) 55' (yellow-red card) 74'; Jones (yellow card) 65'	Report	Crama (yellow card) 54'; Bangura-Williams 88'	Stadium: The Valley; Attendance: 23,293; Referee: Bobby Madley
Note: Fixture was initially scheduled for a 15:00 kick-off, but was moved for live Sky Sports broadcast.

22 September 2025 6	Millwall	1–0	Watford	Bermondsey
20:00 BST	Neghli 10'; Bryan (yellow card) 30'	Report		Stadium: The Den; Attendance: 14,586; Referee: Josh Smith
Note: Fixture was initially scheduled for 20 September, but was moved for live Sky Sports broadcast.

27 September 2025 7	Swansea City	1–1	Millwall	Swansea
12:30 BST	Vipotnik 12'; Cabango (yellow card) 23'	Report	Coburn 45+1'; Bryan (yellow card) 62'; Leonard (yellow card) 81'	Stadium: Swansea.com Stadium; Attendance: 14,942; Referee: Dean Whitestone
Note: Fixture was originally scheduled for a 15:00 kick-off, but was moved live Sky Sports broadcasting.

1 October 2025 8	Millwall	0–4	Coventry City	Bermondsey
19:45 BST	Bryan (yellow card) 17'; Mitchell (yellow card) 46'	Report	Wright 29', 66', (yellow card) 42'; Simms 81'; Van Ewijk (yellow card) 85'; Kesler-Hayden 87'	Stadium: The Den; Attendance: 14,802; Referee: Lewis Smith

4 October 2025 9	Millwall	3–0	West Bromwich Albion	Bermondsey
15:00 BST	Cooper 18', (yellow card) 45+2'; Azeez 56'; Sturge 72'	Report	Mepham (yellow card) 12'; Styles (yellow card) 30'	Stadium: The Den; Attendance: 17,865; Referee: Tim Robinson

18 October 2025 10	Queens Park Rangers	1–2	Millwall	Shepherd's Bush
12:30 BST	Norrington-Davies (yellow card) 55'; Smyth (yellow card) 59'; Burrell 85'	Report	Leonard (yellow card) 33'; Azeez 36'; Cooper (yellow card) 39'; Ivanović 45+4'; Ballo (yellow card) 56'; Doughty (yellow card) 90+5'	Stadium: Loftus Road; Attendance: 17,408; Referee: Adam Herczeg
Note: Fixture was initially scheduled for a 15:00 kick-off, but was moved following consultation with local police.

21 October 2025 11	Millwall	2–0	Stoke City	Bermondsey
19:45 BST	Azeez 10'; Ballo (yellow card) 15'; Crama 21'; Sturge (yellow card) 77'	Report	Tchamadeu (yellow card) 37'	Stadium: The Den; Attendance: 13,792; Referee: James Linington

25 October 2025 12	Millwall	1–0	Leicester City	Bermondsey
15:00 BST	Cooper (yellow card) 28'; Azeez 44'; Ivanović (penalty missed) 56'	Report	Pereira (yellow card) 53'; Winks (yellow card) 83'	Stadium: The Den; Attendance: 18,738; Referee: James Bell

1 November 2025 13	Oxford United	2–2	Millwall	Oxford
15:00 GMT	Branangan 45'; Płacheta 90+6'	Report	Ballo 11'; Cooper 66'	Stadium: Kassam Stadium; Attendance: 11,023; Referee: Farai Hallam

4 November 2025 14	Birmingham City	4–0	Millwall	Birmingham
19:45 GMT	Paik Seung-ho 28'; Gray 45'; Cochrane 49'; Stansfield 66'	Report		Stadium: St Andrew's; Attendance: 25,408; Referee: Gavin Ward

8 November 2025 15	Millwall	1–1	Preston North End	Bermondsey
12:30 GMT	Sturge (yellow card) 13'; Ivanović 36'; Cooper (yellow card) 69'	Report	Smith 15'; Whiteman (yellow card) 21'; Lindsay (yellow card) 87'	Stadium: The Den; Attendance: 15,788; Referee: Stephen Martin
Note: Fixture was originally scheduled for a 15:00 kick-off, but was moved for live Sky Sports broadcasting.

22 November 2025 16	Portsmouth	3–1	Millwall	Portsmouth
15:00 GMT	Swanson 22', (yellow card) 66'; Poole (yellow card) 45+4'; Crama 51' (o.g.); Williams 89'	Report	McNamara (yellow card) 45+4'; Bryan (red card) 67'; Ivanović 72'	Stadium: Fratton Park; Attendance: 20,423; Referee: Michael Salisbury

26 November 2025 17	Millwall	1–0	Sheffield Wednesday	Bermondsey
19:45 GMT	Azeez 71'	Report	Cooper (yellow card) 42'; Iorfa (yellow card) 45+1'; Bannan (yellow card) 88'	Stadium: The Den; Attendance: 13,958; Referee: Jacob Miles
Note: Fixture was initially scheduled for 25 November, but was moved due to Sheffield Wednesday playing on the preceding Sunday.

29 November 2025 18	Millwall	3–2	Southampton	Bermondsey
15:00 GMT	Azeez 72'; Taylor 81'; Crama 90+7', (yellow card) 90+7'	Report	Fellows (yellow card) 37'; Armstrong (yellow card) 47', (goal) 55' (pen.); Azaz 87'	Stadium: The Den; Attendance: 18,732; Referee: Ben Toner

6 December 2025 19	Bristol City	0–1	Millwall	Bristol
15:00 GMT	Armstrong (yellow card) 78'	Report	Bangura-Williams (yellow card) 25'; Cooper (yellow card) 50'; Ivanović 59'; Sturge (yellow card) 80'; Doughty (yellow card) 87'; Ballo (yellow card) 90'	Stadium: Ashton Gate; Attendance: 22,587; Referee: Edward Duckworth

10 December 2025 20	Derby County	1–1	Millwall	Derby
19:45 GMT	Elder (yellow card) 3'; Thompson (yellow card) 19'; Cooper 88' (o.g.)	Report	Azeez (yellow card) 78'; Clarke 81' (o.g.); McNamara (yellow card) 90+1'; Langstaff (yellow card) 90+6'	Stadium: Pride Park Stadium; Attendance: 25,424 (820 away); Referee: Thomas Kirk

13 December 2025 21	Millwall	1–3	Hull City	Bermondsey
15:00 GMT	Azeez (red card) 76'; Emakhu 80'	Report	Joseph 6', 13'; Millar (yellow card) 57'; Coyle (yellow card) 71'; McBurnie 88'; Giles (yellow card) 90+1'	Stadium: The Den; Attendance: 16,419 (1,345 away); Referee: Gavin Ward

20 December 2025 22	Blackburn Rovers	2–0	Millwall	Blackburn
12:30 GMT	Guðjohnsen 3'; McLoughlin (yellow card) 33'; Ōhashi 45', (yellow card) 78'; Cantwell (yellow card) 54'	Report	Neghli (yellow card) 25'; Crama (yellow card) 53'; Bryan (yellow card) 89'	Stadium: Ewood Park; Attendance: 11,657 (575 away); Referee: Sam Allison
Note: Fixture was originally scheduled for a 15:00 kick-off, but was moved for live Sky Sports broadcasting.

26 December 2025 23	Millwall	0–0	Ipswich Town	Bermondsey
13:00 GMT	Leonard (yellow card) 90'	Report	Philogene (yellow card) 49'; Furlong (yellow card) 83'	Stadium: The Den; Attendance: 18,843; Referee: Tim Robinson
Note: Fixture was originally scheduled for a 15:00 kick-off, but was moved for live Sky Sports broadcasting.

29 December 2025 24	Millwall	2–1	Bristol City	Bermondsey
19:45 GMT	Neghli 16'; Doughty (yellow card) 23'; Sturge (yellow card) 38'; Crama (yellow card) 41'; Langstaff 81'; Ballo (yellow card) 83'	Report	Randell 49'; Borges (yellow card) 87'	Stadium: The Den; Attendance: 18,077 (2,202 away); Referee: David Webb

1 January 2026 25	Southampton	0–0	Millwall	Southampton
15:00 GMT	Wood (yellow card) 30'	Report	Sturge (yellow card) 37'; Langstaff (yellow card) 69'; Mitchell (yellow card) 90+1'	Stadium: St Mary's Stadium; Attendance: 30,182; Referee: Tom Nield

4 January 2026 26	Millwall	2–1	Swansea City	Bermondsey
15:00 GMT	Ivanović 38'; Neghli (yellow card) 66'; Sturge (yellow card) 72'; Taylor 90+2'	Report	Cabango 47'	Stadium: The Den; Attendance: 14,242 (949 away); Referee: John Busby

17 January 2026 27	Watford	0–2	Millwall	Watford
12:30 GMT	Kyprianou (yellow card) 45+4'; Chakvetadze (yellow card) 54'; Irankunda (yellow card) 89'; Pollock (yellow card) 89'	Report	Mitchell (yellow card) 49'; Doughty (yellow card) 66'; Azeez 69'; Neghli (yellow card) 71'; Coburn 81'; Crama (yellow card) 89'	Stadium: Vicarage Road; Attendance: 19,074; Referee: Ruebyn Ricardo
Note: Fixture was initially scheduled for a 15:00 kick-off, but was moved for live Sky Sports broadcast.

20 January 2026 28	Coventry City	2–1	Millwall	Coventry
19:45 GMT	Esse 11', (yellow card) 19'; Eccles (yellow card) 67'; Wright 78'	Report	Ivanović 29'; Sturge (yellow card) 73'	Stadium: Coventry Building Society Arena; Attendance: 28,605; Referee: Andrew Kitchen

24 January 2026 29	Millwall	4–0	Charlton Athletic	Bermondsey
12:30 GMT	Ramsay 7' (o.g.); Crama (yellow card) 68'; Taylor 81'; Neghli (penalty missed) 90+2'; Cundle 90+2'; Emakhu 90+3'	Report	Anderson (yellow card) 26'	Stadium: The Den; Attendance: 19,004; Referee: Gavin Ward
Note: Fixture was initially scheduled for a 15:00 kick-off, but was moved for live Sky Sports broadcast.

31 January 2026 30	Millwall	1–1	Sheffield United	Bermondsey
15:00 GMT	Ivanović 19'; Cooper (yellow card) 78'; De Norre (yellow card) 84'	Report	Brooks 17'; McGuinness (yellow card) 69'	Stadium: The Den; Attendance: 18,007 (2,116); Referee: Lewis Smith

7 February 2026 31	Wrexham	0–2	Millwall	Wrexham
15:00 GMT	Cleworth (yellow card) 56'	Report	Cleworth 59' (o.g.); Ivanović (yellow card) 62'; Bannan (yellow card) 69'; Watson (yellow card) 82'; Coburn 85'	Stadium: Racecourse Ground; Attendance: 10,663 (1,293 away); Referee: Tim Robinson

14 February 2026 32	Sheffield Wednesday	1–2	Millwall	Owlerton
15:00 GMT	McGhee (yellow card) 36'; Lowe (yellow card) 50', (goal) 60'; Otegbayo (yellow card) 87'	Report	De Norre (yellow card) 40'; Taylor (yellow card) 67'; McGhee 72' (o.g.); Langstaff 74'	Stadium: Hillsborough Stadium; Attendance: 22,488 (1,843 away); Referee: Edward Duckworth

21 February 2026 33	Millwall	1–3	Portsmouth	Bermondsey
15:00 GMT	De Norre 64'; Crama (yellow card) 75'	Report	Alli (yellow card) 17'; Caballero 46'; Swift 55', (yellow card) 60'; Pack 67'	Stadium: The Den; Attendance: 19,153 (3,178 away); Referee: Stephen Martin

25 February 2026 34	Millwall	3–0	Birmingham City	Bermondsey
19:45 GMT	Azeez 25'; Crama 31'; Cooper 49'	Report		Stadium: The Den; Attendance: 16,636

28 February 2026 35	Preston North End	0–2	Millwall	Preston
15:00 GMT	Lang (yellow card) 65'; Gibson (yellow card) 74'; Hughes (yellow card) 78'	Report	Leonard 29', (yellow card) 57'; De Norre (yellow card) 80'; Cundle 90+2'	Stadium: Deepdale; Attendance: TBC (1,666 away); Referee: Ben Toner

7 March 2026 36	Hull City	1–3	Millwall	Kingston upon Hull
12:30 GMT	Gelhardt 18'; Lundstram (yellow card) 31'; Hughes (yellow card) 74'	Report	Cooper 14', (yellow card) 57'; Watson (yellow card) 39'; Cundle (yellow card) 54'; Ivanović 70'; Mitchell (yellow card) 76'; Coburn 78'	Stadium: MKM Stadium; Attendance: 21,504 (1,690 away); Referee: David Webb
Note: Fixture was originally scheduled for a 15:00 kick-off, but was brought forward for live Sky Sports broadcasting.

10 March 2026 37	Millwall	1–0	Derby County	Bermondsey
19:45 GMT	Coburn 43'	Report	Clark (yellow card) 55'; Sanderson (yellow card) 58'; Morris (yellow card) 61'	Stadium: The Den; Attendance: 15,939 (1,801 away); Referee: Matthew Donohue

14 March 2026 38	Millwall	1–2	Blackburn Rovers	Bermondsey
15:00 GMT	Cundle 54'; Sturge (red card) 59'	Report	Jørgensen 80', 85'; Atcheson (yellow card) 90+6'	Stadium: The Den; Attendance: 17,802 (846 away); Referee: Andrew Kitchen

21 March 2026 39	Ipswich Town	1–1	Millwall	Ipswich
12:30 GMT	Clarke 41'; Azón (yellow card) 53'	Report	Coburn (yellow card) 16', (goal) 50'; Mazou-Sacko (yellow card) 86'	Stadium: Portman Road; Attendance: 29,129 (2,001 away); Referee: Michael Salisbury
Note: Fixture was initially scheduled for a 15:00 kick-off, but was brought forward for Sky Sports and ITV Sport broadcasting.

3 April 2026 40	Middlesbrough	1–2	Millwall	Middlesbrough
12:30 GMT	McGree (yellow card) 13'; Fry 26'	Report	Cooper (yellow card) 13'; Coburn 58', 86'	Stadium: Riverside Stadium; Attendance: 32,100 (2,118 away); Referee: Anthony Backhouse
Note: Fixture was initially scheduled for a 15:00 kick-off, but was brought forward for Sky Sports broadcasting.

6 April 2025 41	Millwall	1–2	Norwich City	Bermondsey
13:00 BST	Ivanović 56'; Bryan (yellow card) 88'	Report	Córdoba (yellow card) 24'; Mattsson 62'; Schwartau 76', (yellow card) 88'	Stadium: The Den; Attendance: 18,855 (2,998 away); Referee: Samuel Allison
Note: Fixture was originally scheduled for a 15:00 kick-off, but was following an agreement between the two sides.

10 April 2026 42	West Bromwich Albion	0–0	Millwall	West Bromwich
20:00 BST	Mowatt (yellow card) 56'	Report	Azeez (yellow card) 71'; Ivanović (yellow card) 90+5'	Stadium: The Hawthorns; Attendance: 23,447 (2,542 away); Referee: Lewis Smith
Note: Fixture was initially scheduled for 11 April, but was moved for live Sky Sports broadcasting.

18 April 2026 43	Millwall	2–0	Queens Park Rangers	Bermondsey
12:30 BST	Mazou-Sacko 3'; Neghli 17'; Azeez (yellow card) 34'	Report	Edwards (yellow card) 19'; Mbengue (yellow card) 30'; Hayden (yellow card) 90+2'	Stadium: The Den; Attendance: 18,924 (2,957 away); Referee: Tom Nield
Note: Fixture was initially scheduled for a 15:00 kick-off, but was brought forward for live Sky Sports broadcasting.

21 April 2026 44	Stoke City	1–3	Millwall	Stoke-on-Trent
19:45 BST	Taylor 60' (o.g.)	Report	Mazou-Sacko (yellow card) 5'; De Norre (yellow card) 15'; Neghli 20'; Azeez 55'; Coburn 69'; McNamara (yellow card) 81'	Stadium: bet365 Stadium; Attendance: 20,961 (1,302 away); Referee: Josh Smith

24 April 2026 45	Leicester City	1–1	Millwall	Leicester
20:00 BST	Choudhury (yellow card) 72'; Souttar 78'	Report	Cooper (yellow card) 50'; Azeez (yellow card) 60'; Ballo (yellow card) 67'; Langstaff 90'	Stadium: King Power Stadium; Attendance: 28,729 (3,287 away); Referee: Farai Hallam
Note: Fixture was initially scheduled for 25 April, but was brought forward for live Sky Sports broadcasting.

2 May 2026 46	Millwall	2–0	Oxford United	Bermondsey
12:30 BST	Azeez 34', 48'; Ballo (yellow card) 39'	Report		Stadium: The Den; Attendance: 18,043; Referee: Anthony Backhouse

==== Play-offs ====
Millwall finished 3rd, in the regular season and were drawn against 6th place Hull City.

===== Semi-finals =====
8 May 2026 Semi final (1st leg)	Hull City	0–0	Millwall	Kingston upon Hull
20:00 BST		Report	De Norre (yellow card) 52'	Stadium: MKM Stadium; Attendance: 24,623 (2,308 away); Referee: Gavin Ward

11 May 2026 Semi final (2nd leg)	Millwall	0–2 (0–2 agg.)	Hull City	New Cross
20:00 BST	Azeez (yellow card) 88'	Report	Egan (yellow card) 10'; Hughes (yellow card) 52'; Belloumi 64', (yellow card) 69'; Gelhardt 79', (yellow card) 90+5'	Stadium: The Den; Attendance: 17,768; Referee: Sam Barrott

=== FA Cup ===
As a Championship side, Millwall enter the FA Cup in the third round and were drawn away to Burnley.

Win Draw Loss Fixtures

10 January 2026 Third round	Burnley	5–1	Millwall	Burnley
15:00 GMT	Barnes 11', 65'; Tchaouna 35', (yellow card) 80'; Sonne (yellow card) 42'; Anthony 44'; Hannibal (yellow card) 85'; Banel 89'	Report	Leonard (yellow card) 34'; Coburn 90+4'	Stadium: Turf Moor; Attendance: 6,856 (689 away); Referee: Anthony Backhouse

=== EFL Cup ===
Millwall were drawn away to Newport County in the first round, At home to Coventry City in the second round and away to Crystal Palace in the third round.

Win Draw Loss Fixtures

12 August 2025 First round	Newport County	0–1	Millwall	Newport
19:30 BST		Report	Leonard (yellow card) 16', (goal) 60'; Luongo (yellow card) 74'	Stadium: Rodney Parade; Attendance: 2,617; Referee: Scott Oldham

26 August 2025 Second round	Millwall	2–1	Coventry City	Bermondsey
19:45 BST	Grant (yellow card) 17', (goal) 76'; Luongo 33'; Mayor (yellow card) 71'	Report	Raphael (yellow card) 59'; Kitching (yellow card) 73'; Wright 89'	Stadium: The Den; Attendance: 7,048; Referee: Stephen Martin

16 September 2025 Third round	Crystal Palace	1–1 (4–2 p)	Millwall	Selhurst
20:00 BST	Richards 72'; Hughes (yellow card) 76'	Report	Ballo (yellow card) 60'; Bangura-Williams (yellow card) 70'; Mazou-Sacko (yellow card) 83'; Leonard 90+1', (yellow card) 90+5'	Stadium: Selhurst Park; Attendance: 16,754; Referee: John Busby
	Penalties
	Mateta (penalty scored); Richards (penalty scored); Devenny (penalty scored); Kamada (penalty scored)		(penalty missed) Crama; (penalty scored) Harding; (penalty scored) Leonard; (penalty missed) Emakhu

== Statistics ==
=== Appearances and goals ===
Players with no appearances are not included on the list; italics indicate loaned in player

No.	Pos	Nat	Player	Total		Championship		FA Cup		EFL Cup		Championship play-offs	
No.	Pos	Nat	Player	Apps	Goals	Apps	Goals	Apps	Goals	Apps	Goals	Apps	Goals
2	DF	(Republic of Ireland) IRL	Danny McNamara	17	0	6+10	0	0+1	0	0+0	0	0+0	0
3	DF	(England) ENG	Zak Sturge	42	1	29+9	1	0+0	0	2+0	0	2+0	0
4	DF	(France) FRA	Tristan Crama	50	3	46+0	3	0+0	0	2+0	0	2+0	0
5	DF	(England) ENG	Jake Cooper	49	4	45+0	4	1+0	0	1+0	0	2+0	0
6	DF	(England) ENG	Caleb Taylor	29	3	24+4	3	0+0	0	1+0	0	0+0	0
7	FW	(Austria) AUT	Thierno Ballo	35	1	23+8	1	1+0	0	0+1	0	2+0	0
8	MF	(England) ENG	Billy Mitchell	30	0	24+5	0	1+0	0	0+0	0	0+0	0
9	FW	(Serbia) SRB	Mihailo Ivanović	47	9	31+13	9	0+0	0	1+0	0	0+2	0
10	FW	(Algeria) ALG	Camiel Neghli	49	5	37+9	5	0+0	0	1+0	0	2+0	0
11	FW	(Nigeria) NGR	Femi Azeez	37	11	33+2	11	0+0	0	0+0	0	2+0	0
12	DF	(England) ENG	Adam Mayor	1	0	0+0	0	0+0	0	0+1	0	0+0	0
13	GK	(England) ENG	Anthony Patterson	16	0	14+0	0	0+0	0	0+0	0	2+0	0
14	DF	(England) ENG	Alfie Doughty	28	0	16+9	0	1+0	0	0+0	0	0+2	0
15	GK	(New Zealand) NZL	Max Crocombe	25	0	23+0	0	0+0	0	2+0	0	0+0	0
16	MF	(Scotland) SCO	Daniel Kelly	12	0	3+6	0	0+0	0	2+1	0	0+0	0
17	FW	(England) ENG	Macaulay Langstaff	40	4	12+25	4	1+0	0	1+0	0	0+1	0
18	DF	(England) ENG	Ryan Leonard	28	3	15+8	1	1+0	0	1+1	2	2+0	0
19	FW	(England) ENG	Josh Coburn	31	10	22+4	9	0+1	1	1+1	0	2+0	0
21	MF	(Australia) AUS	Massimo Luongo	11	1	7+2	0	0+0	0	2+0	1	0+0	0
22	FW	(England) ENG	Tom Watson	12	0	2+10	0	0+0	0	0+0	0	0+0	0
23	DF	(England) ENG	Joe Bryan	21	0	6+13	0	1+0	0	1+0	0	0+0	0
24	MF	(Belgium) BEL	Casper De Norre	32	1	27+2	1	0+0	0	0+1	0	2+0	0
25	MF	(England) ENG	Luke Cundle	32	4	10+18	4	0+0	0	2+0	0	0+2	0
27	DF	(England) ENG	Kamarl Grant	4	1	0+0	0	1+0	0	3+0	1	0+0	0
28	FW	(England) ENG	Ajay Matthews	3	0	0+0	0	0+1	0	0+2	0	0+0	0
29	FW	(England) ENG	Zak Lovelace	1	0	0+1	0	0+0	0	0+0	0	0+0	0
30	MF	(England) ENG	Rafiq Lamptey	1	0	0+0	0	0+1	0	0+0	0	0+0	0
31	FW	(England) ENG	Raees Bangura-Williams	18	1	5+9	1	1+0	0	2+1	0	0+0	0
32	FW	(Guyana) GUY	Sheldon Kendall	2	0	0+0	0	0+0	0	0+2	0	0+0	0
39	MF	(Republic of Ireland) IRL	Will Smallbone	10	0	4+6	0	0+0	0	0+0	0	0+0	0
45	DF	(Jamaica) JAM	Wes Harding	11	0	2+6	0	0+0	0	2+1	0	0+0	0
47	FW	(England) ENG	Jack Howland	3	0	0+0	0	0+1	0	1+1	0	0+0	0
49	MF	(France) FRA	Derek Mazou-Sacko	24	1	11+10	1	0+0	0	1+0	0	2+0	0
67	MF	(Scotland) SCO	Barry Bannan	16	0	6+8	0	0+0	0	0+0	0	0+2	0
Players who featured but departed the club during the season:
6	DF	(England) ENG	Japhet Tanganga	2	0	2+0	0	0+0	0	0+0	0	0+0	0
7	FW	(Scotland) SCO	Kevin Nisbet	4	0	0+2	0	0+0	0	1+1	0	0+0	0
13	GK	(Germany) GER	Steven Benda	11	0	9+0	0	1+0	0	1+0	0	0+0	0
22	FW	(Republic of Ireland) IRL	Aidomo Emakhu	31	2	12+15	2	1+0	0	2+1	0	0+0	0

=== Disciplinary record ===
Rank	No.	Pos.	Player	Championship			FA Cup			EFL Cup			Championship play-offs			Total		
Rank	No.	Pos.	Player	Yellow card	(yellow card) (yellow-red card)	Red card	Yellow card	(yellow card) (yellow-red card)	Red card	Yellow card	(yellow card) (yellow-red card)	Red card	Yellow card	(yellow card) (yellow-red card)	Red card	Yellow card	(yellow card) (yellow-red card)	Red card
1	3	DF	(England) Zak Sturge	8	0	1	0	0	0	0	0	0	0	0	0	8	0	1
2	5	DF	(England) Jake Cooper	10	0	0	0	0	0	0	0	0	0	0	0	10	0	0
3	4	DF	(France) Tristan Crama	9	0	0	0	0	0	0	0	0	0	0	0	9	0	0
3	11	MF	(Nigeria) Femi Azeez	5	0	1	0	0	0	0	0	0	1	0	0	6	0	1
5	23	DF	(England) Joe Bryan	5	0	1	0	0	0	0	0	0	0	0	0	5	0	1
6	7	FW	(Austria) Thierno Ballo	6	0	0	0	0	0	1	0	0	0	0	0	7	0	0
6	18	DF	(England) Ryan Leonard	4	0	0	1	0	0	2	0	0	0	0	0	7	0	0
8	8	MF	(England) Billy Mitchell	6	0	0	0	0	0	0	0	0	0	0	0	6	0	0
9	24	MF	(Belgium) Casper De Norre	4	0	0	0	0	0	0	0	0	1	0	0	5	0	0
10	10	FW	(Algeria) Camiel Neghli	4	0	0	0	0	0	0	0	0	0	0	0	4	0	0
10	14	DF	(England) Alfie Doughty	4	0	0	0	0	0	0	0	0	0	0	0	4	0	0
12	2	DF	(Republic of Ireland) Danny McNamara	3	0	0	0	0	0	0	0	0	0	0	0	3	0	0
12	31	FW	(England) Raees Bangura-Williams	2	0	0	0	0	0	1	0	0	0	0	0	3	0	0
12	49	MF	(France) Derek Mazou-Sacko	2	0	0	0	0	0	1	0	0	0	0	0	3	0	0
15	9	FW	(Serbia) Mihailo Ivanović	2	0	0	0	0	0	0	0	0	0	0	0	2	0	0
15	17	FW	(England) Macaulay Langstaff	2	0	0	0	0	0	0	0	0	0	0	0	2	0	0
15	19	FW	(England) Josh Coburn	2	0	0	0	0	0	0	0	0	0	0	0	2	0	0
15	21	MF	(Australia) Massimo Luongo	1	0	0	0	0	0	1	0	0	0	0	0	2	0	0
15	22	FW	(England) Tom Watson	2	0	0	0	0	0	0	0	0	0	0	0	2	0	0
20	6	DF	(England) Japhet Tanganga	1	0	0	0	0	0	0	0	0	0	0	0	1	0	0
20	6	DF	(England) Caleb Taylor	1	0	0	0	0	0	0	0	0	0	0	0	1	0	0
20	12	DF	(England) Adam Mayor	0	0	0	0	0	0	1	0	0	0	0	0	1	0	0
20	25	MF	(England) Luke Cundle	1	0	0	0	0	0	0	0	0	0	0	0	1	0	0
20	27	DF	(England) Kamarl Grant	0	0	0	0	0	0	1	0	0	0	0	0	1	0	0
20	67	MF	(Scotland) Barry Bannan	1	0	0	0	0	0	0	0	0	0	0	0	1	0	0
Total				86	0	3	1	0	0	8	0	0	2	0	0	97	0	3
