= Camiel Neghli =

Algerian footballer (born 2001)

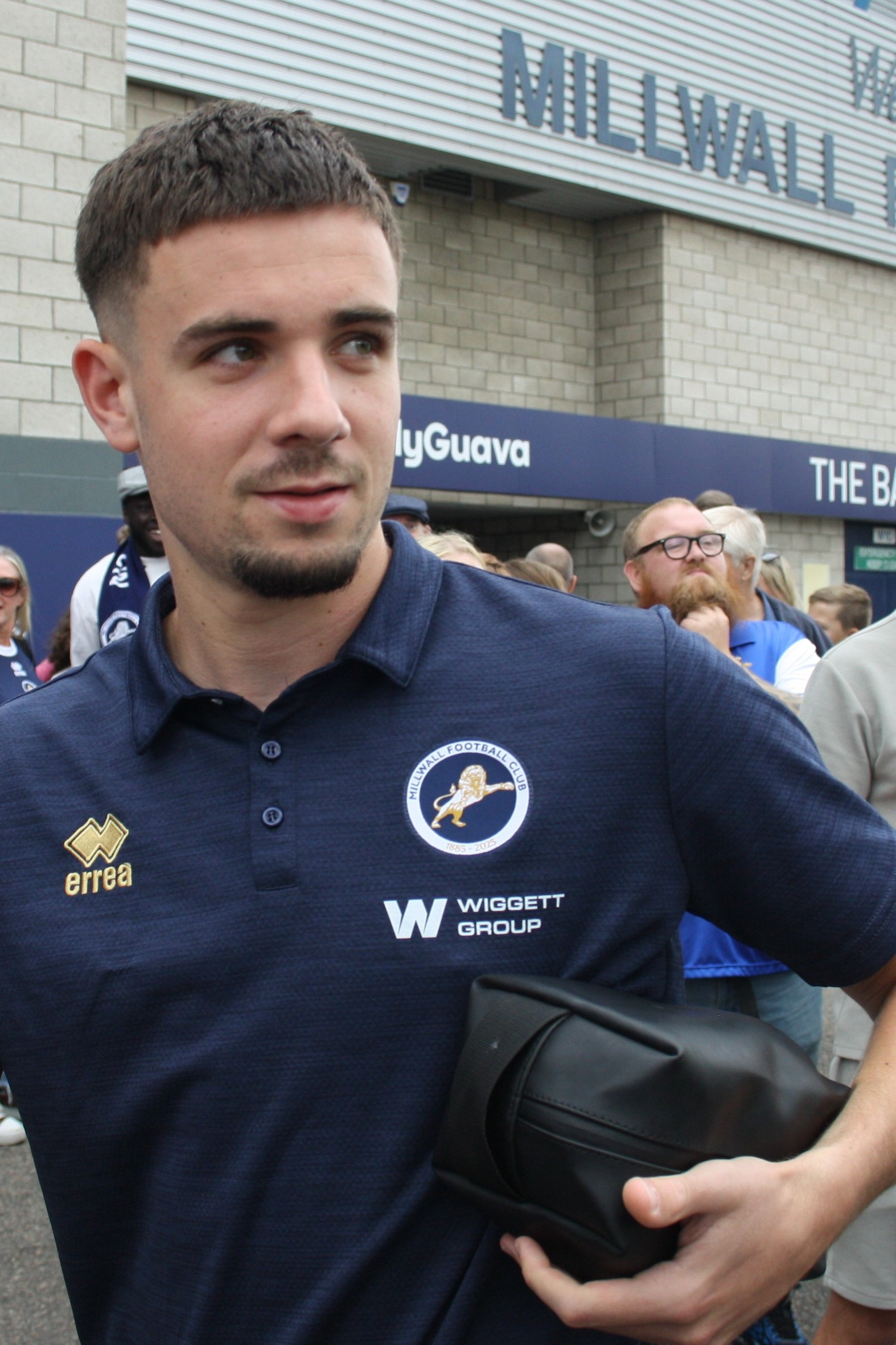
- Neghli with Millwall in 2025

Personal information
- Full name: Camiel Neghli
- Date of birth: 6 November 2001 (age 25)
- Place of birth: Ede, Netherlands
- Height: 1.79 m (5 ft 10 1/2 in)
- Position: Midfielder

Team information
- Current team: Millwall
- Number: 10

Youth career
- FC Twente
- 2014–2020: De Graafschap

Senior career*
Years	Team	Apps	(Gls)
2020–2023	De Graafschap	54	(15)
2023–2025	Sparta Rotterdam	46	(10)
2025–	Millwall	59	(9)

International career^{‡}
2022	Algeria U20	2	(0)
2022–	Algeria U23	5	(0)
- * Club domestic league appearances and goals as of 03:06, 13 October 2026 (UTC) ‡ National team caps and goals as of 22 June 2022

Camiel Neghli (Arabic: كميل نيجلي; born 6 November 2001) is a professional footballer who plays for EFL Championship club Millwall. Born in the Netherlands, he represents Algeria at youth level.

== Club career ==
=== De Graafschap ===
On 4 December 2020, Neghli made his debut for De Graafschap in the Eerste Divisie in a 3–2 win against MVV Maastricht.

=== Sparta Rotterdam ===
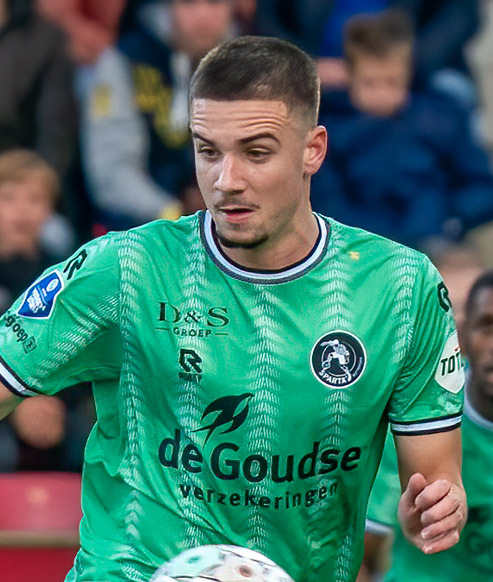
Neghli with Sparta Rotterdam in 2023.

On 12 July 2023, Neghli signed a contract with Sparta Rotterdam for the term of three years with an optional fourth year.

On 25 August 2024, Neghli scored a long-range volley to secure a 1–1 draw against city rivals Feyenoord, marking his first goal of the new campaign.

=== Millwall ===
On 31 January 2025, Neghli signed for EFL Championship club Millwall for an undisclosed fee, which was reported by Millwall to be their record transfer fee and widely believed to be £3m. He made his debut for Millwall on 8 February 2025, in a 2–0 win against Leeds United in the FA Cup. He scored his first goal for the club on 12 April 2025, in a 1–0 win against Middlesbrough.

== International career ==
In May 2022, Neghli was called up to the Algeria under-23 national team for the first time for a friendly match against Palestine.

== Career statistics ==
=== Club ===
As of match played 10 October 2026

Appearances and goals by club, season and competition
Club	Season	League			National Cup (Note: Includes KNVB Cup, FA Cup)		League Cup (Note: Includes EFL Cup)		Other		Total	
Club	Season	Division	Apps	Goals	Apps	Goals	Apps	Goals	Apps	Goals	Apps	Goals
De Graafschap	2020–21	Eerste Divisie	8	1	0	0	—		0	0	8	1
De Graafschap	2021–22	Eerste Divisie	14	3	1	0	—		2 (Note: Appearances in Eredivisie promotion play-offs)	0	17	3
De Graafschap	2022–23	Eerste Divisie	32	11	4	1	—		—		36	12
De Graafschap	Total		54	15	5	1	0	0	2	0	61	16
Sparta Rotterdam	2023–24	Eredivisie	26	5	2	1	—		1 (Note: Appearances in Eredivisie European play-offs)	0	29	6
Sparta Rotterdam	2024–25	Eredivisie	20	5	2	0	—		0	0	22	5
Sparta Rotterdam	Total		46	10	4	1	0	0	1	0	51	11
Millwall	2024–25	Championship	4	1	2	0	—		—		6	1
Millwall	2025–26	Championship	46	5	0	0	1	0	2 (Note: Appearances in EFL Championship play-offs)	0	49	5
Millwall	2026–27	Championship	9	3	0	0	3	0	0	0	12	3
Millwall	Total		59	9	2	0	4	0	2	0	67	9
Career total			159	34	11	2	4	0	5	0	179	36
