= Alfie Massey =

English association football player

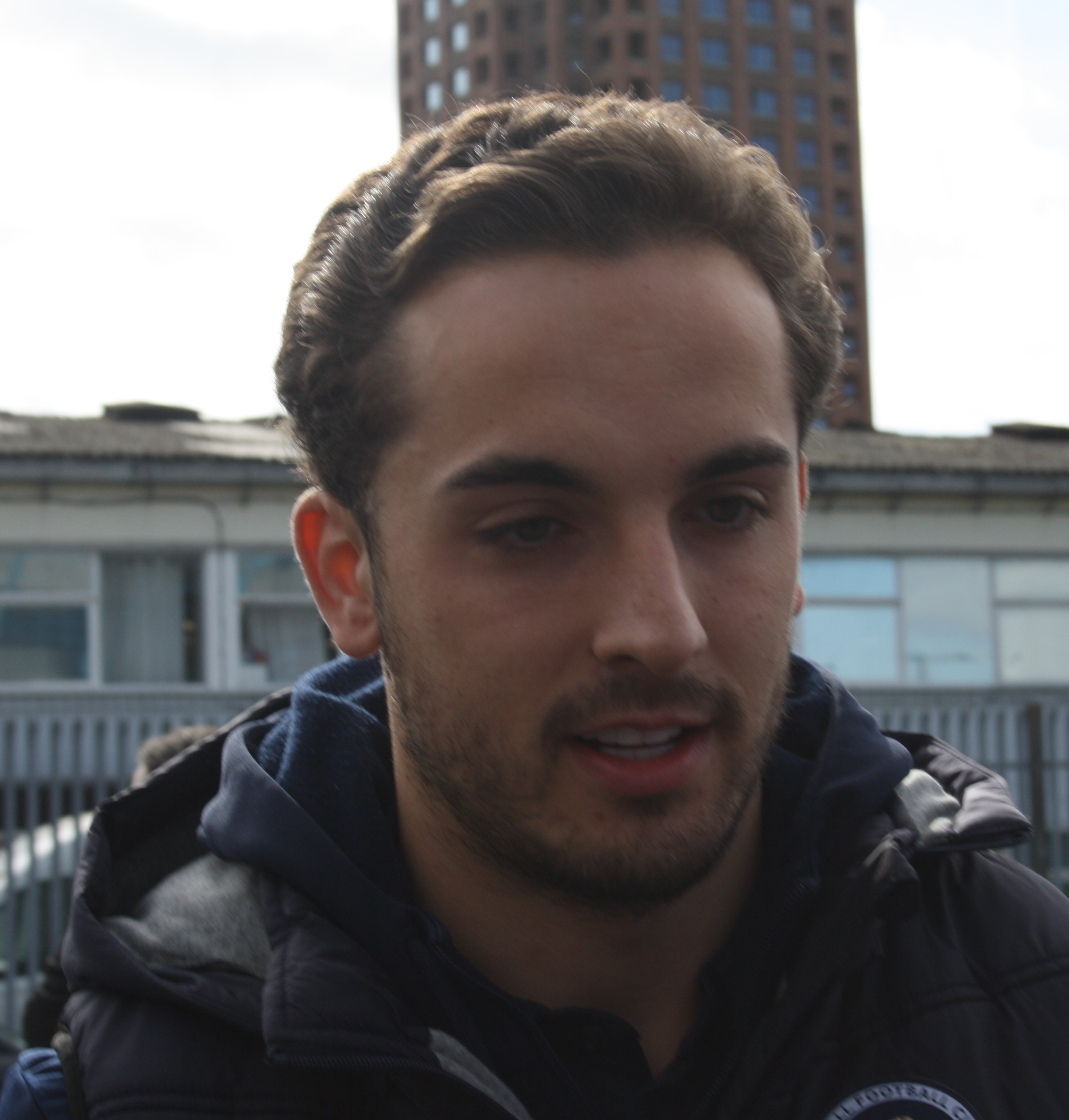
- Massey in 2026.

Personal information
- Full name: Alfie Ben Massey
- Date of birth: 18 January 2006 (age 20)
- Place of birth: Greenwich, England
- Height: 1.83 m (6 ft 0 in)
- Position: Midfielder

Team information
- Current team: Hornchurch (on loan from Millwall)
- Number: 27

Youth career
- 2012–2015: West Ham United
- 2015–201?: Arsenal
- 201?–2024: Millwall

Senior career*
Years	Team	Apps	(Gls)
2024–	Millwall	1	(0)
2025	→ Wealdstone (loan)	10	(0)
2026	→ Southend United (loan)	4	(0)
2026–	→ Hornchurch (loan)	7	(0)
- * Club domestic league appearances and goals as of 14:20, 1 November 2026 (UTC)

Alfie Ben Massey (born 18 January 2006) is an English professional footballer who plays as a midfielder for Hornchurch on loan from EFL Championship side Millwall.

== Club career ==
Massey grew up in Welling and joined the youth academy at West Ham United at six years-old. Three years later he moved to the youth academy at Arsenal where as a teenager he began to be played less in midfield and more in defence. He played U18 and U21 football in the youth system at Millwall prior to signing his first professional contract with the club. He was involved in training with the first-team during the 2024-25 pre-season and attended the first-team training camp in Spain that summer.

He made his professional debut starting for Millwall in the EFL Cup on 13 August 2024 in a 1–0 win away against Portsmouth. He signed a new long-term professional contract with the club that same week.

On 12 August 2025, Massey joined National League side Wealdstone on a loan deal until January 2026. On 30 August 2025, he scored his first senior goal in a 3–1 defeat against Rochdale. After two goals in 12 appearances, the loan was cut short due to a hamstring injury. In March 2026, he returned to the National League, joining Southend United on loan for the remainder of the season.

On 25 September 2026, Massey returned to the National League, joining Hornchurch on loan until 3 January 2027.

== Career statistics ==
As of end of 2025–26 season

Appearances and goals by club, season and competition
Club	Season	League			National cup (Note: Includes FA Cup)		League cup (Note: Includes EFL Cup)		Other cup		Total	
Club	Season	Division	Apps	Goals	Apps	Goals	Apps	Goals	Apps	Goals	Apps	Goals
Millwall	2024–25	Championship	0	0	1	0	1	0	—		2	0
Millwall	2025–26	Championship	0	0	0	0	0	0	0	0	0	0
Millwall	2026–27	Championship	1	0	0	0	2	0	—		3	0
Millwall	Total		1	0	1	0	3	0	—		5	0
Wealdstone (loan)	2025–26	National League	10	2	0	0	—		2 (Note: Appearances in the National League Cup)	0	12	2
Southend United (loan)	2025–26	National League	4	0	0	0	—		0	0	4	0
Career total			15	2	1	0	3	0	2	0	21	2
