= Tristan Crama =

French footballer (born 2001)

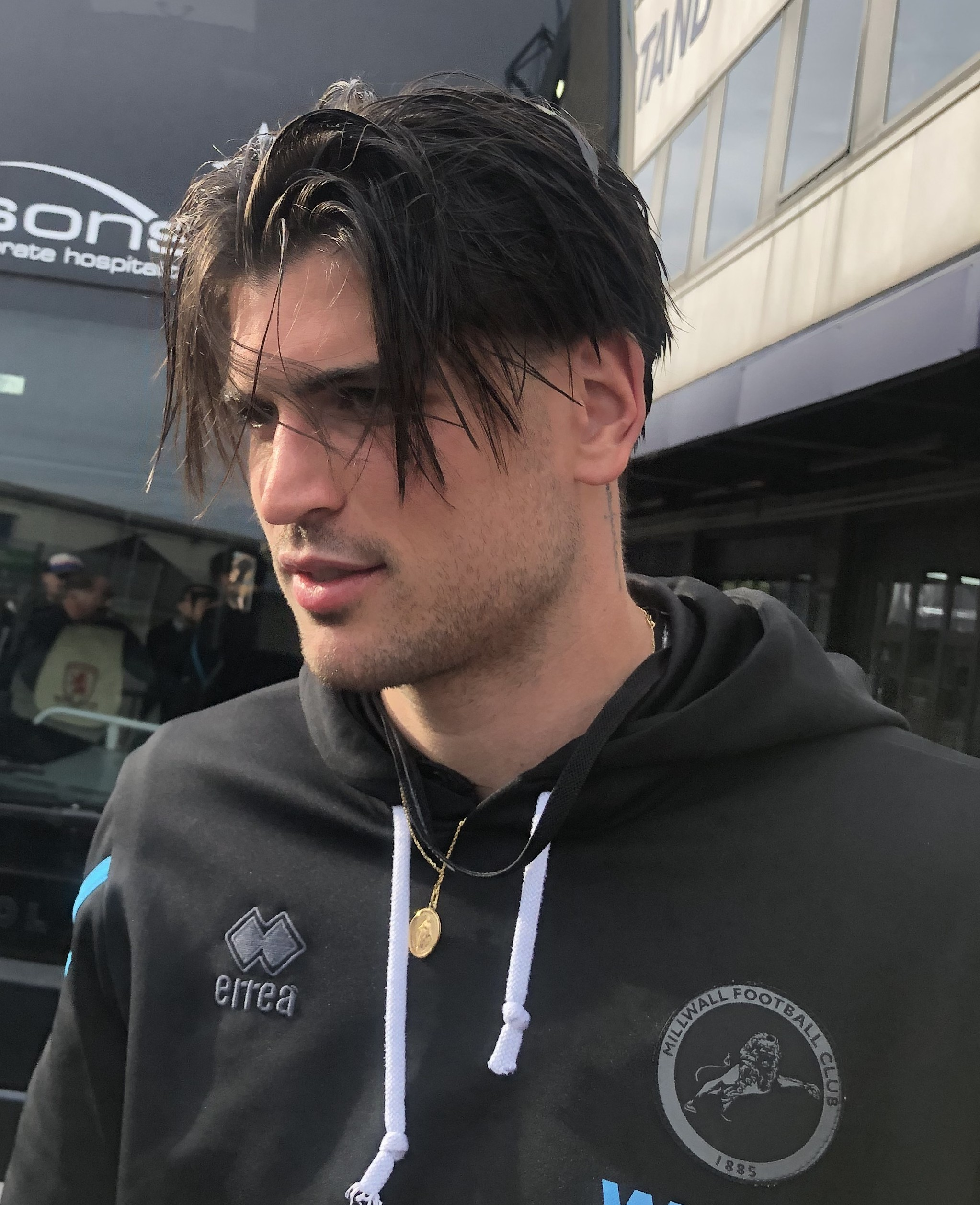
- Crama while a Millwall player in 2025.

Personal information
- Full name: Tristan Pierre Crama
- Date of birth: 8 November 2001 (age 25)
- Place of birth: Béziers, France
- Height: 1.92 m (6 ft 4 in)
- Position: Central defender

Team information
- Current team: Millwall
- Number: 4

Youth career
- –2020: Béziers

Senior career*
Years	Team	Apps	(Gls)
2019–2020	Béziers II	6	(0)
2020	Béziers	5	(0)
2020–2025	Brentford	0	(0)
2023–2024	→ Bristol Rovers (loan)	27	(0)
2024–2025	→ Exeter City (loan)	22	(3)
2025–	Millwall	66	(3)
- * Club domestic league appearances and goals as of 09:57, 26 August 2026 (UTC)

Tristan Pierre Crama (born 8 November 2001) is a French professional footballer who plays as a central defender for EFL Championship club Millwall.

Crama is a product of the Béziers academy and transferred to Brentford in 2020. After failing to break into the first team squad, he transferred to Millwall in 2025.

== Career ==
=== Béziers ===
Initially a forward and then a holding midfielder, Crama began his career in his native France in the Béziers youth system at U11 level. Following a growth spurt, he was developed into a central defender. Crama progressed to the reserve team and made 6 Championnat National 3 appearances between October and December 2020, before being promoted into the first team squad and making five Championnat National appearances during the second half of the truncated 2019–20 season. Despite signing his first professional contract with the club in March 2020, Crama departed the Stade Raoul-Barrière in August 2020.

=== Brentford ===
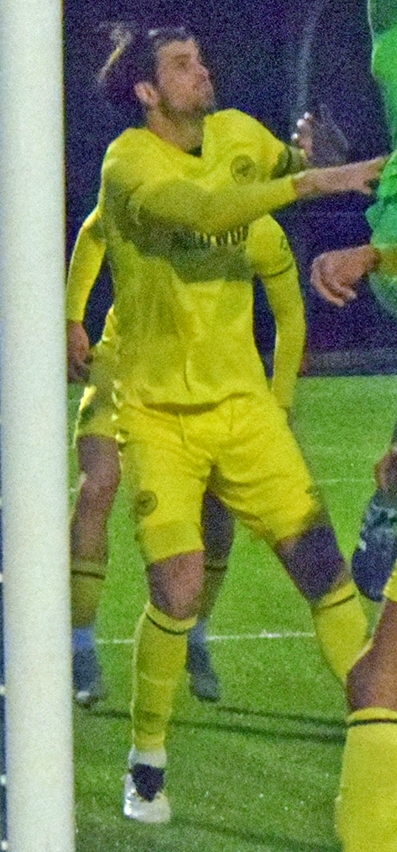
Crama playing for Brentford B in April 2022.

On 25 August 2020, Crama moved to England to join the B team at Championship club Brentford on a two-year contract, with the option of a further year, for an undisclosed fee. Following two seasons of exclusively B team football, the option on Crama's contract was taken up in May 2022. On 30 June 2022, he signed a new two-year contract, with the option of a further year. Crama was including the first team squad for its 2022–23 pre-season and mid-season training camps and was an unused substitute during five regular season matches. A proposed loan to Ligue 1 club Montpellier during the mid-season transfer window was rejected.

Following an appearance in the first team's opening 2023–24 pre-season friendly, Crama signed a new three-year contract, with the option of a further year. On 25 July 2023, Crama and Brentford teammate Matthew Cox joined League One club Bristol Rovers on season-long loans. Deployed predominantly as a starter when fit, Crama made 34 appearances during a mid-table 2023–24 season.

Following two 2024–25 first team pre-season appearances and inclusion in the first team squad's Portugal training camp, Crama joined League One club Exeter City on a season-long loan. Prior to his recall on 16 January 2025, Crama made 26 appearances, scored four goals and twice won the club's Player of the Month award. He transferred away from Brentford the following day and ended his B team career on 89 appearances and 11 goals.

=== Millwall ===
On 17 January 2025, Crama transferred to Championship club Millwall and signed a "long-term" contract for an undisclosed fee. Injuries led to his immediate breakthrough into the team in an unfamiliar right back role. Crama played the majority of his 20 appearances in the position during the remainder of the 2024–25 season.

Crama made 50 appearances and scored three goals during the 2025–26 season, in which he made half of his appearances at right back. Crama's performances led to him being voted the club's Players' Player of the Year and receiving Championship Team of the Year recognition from the EFL and PFA. The season ended with defeat in the playoff semi-finals, during which Crama suffered an injury to his right ankle, which required surgery. After returning to fitness, Crama sustained an injury to his left ankle during his first 2026–27 pre-season friendly appearance, which required surgery.

== Personal life ==
Crama's father was a semi-professional footballer and coach.

== Career statistics ==
As of match played 11 May 2026

Appearances and goals by club, season and competition
Club	Season	League			National cup (Note: Includes FA Cup)		League cup (Note: Includes EFL Cup)		Other		Total	
Club	Season	Division	Apps	Goals	Apps	Goals	Apps	Goals	Apps	Goals	Apps	Goals
Béziers II	2019–20	Championnat National 3 Group H	6	0	―		―		―		6	0
Béziers	2019–20	Championnat National	5	0	―		―		―		5	0
Brentford	2022–23	Premier League	0	0	0	0	0	0	―		0	0
Bristol Rovers (loan)	2023–24	League One	27	0	4	0	1	0	2 (Note: Appearances in EFL Trophy)	0	34	0
Exeter City (loan)	2024–25	League One	22	3	3	1	1	0	0	0	26	4
Millwall	2024–25	Championship	20	0	―		―		―		20	0
Millwall	2025–26	Championship	46	3	0	0	2	0	2 (Note: Appearances in Championship play-offs)	0	50	3
Millwall	Total		66	3	0	0	2	0	2	0	70	3
Career total			126	6	7	1	4	0	4	0	141	7

== Honours ==
Brentford B

- London Senior Cup: 2021–22
- Premier League Cup: 2022–23

Individual

- EFL Championship Team of the Year: 2025–26
- PFA Team of the Year: 2025–26 Championship
- Millwall Players' Player of the Year: 2025–26
