= Jake Cooper (footballer, born 1995) =

English footballer

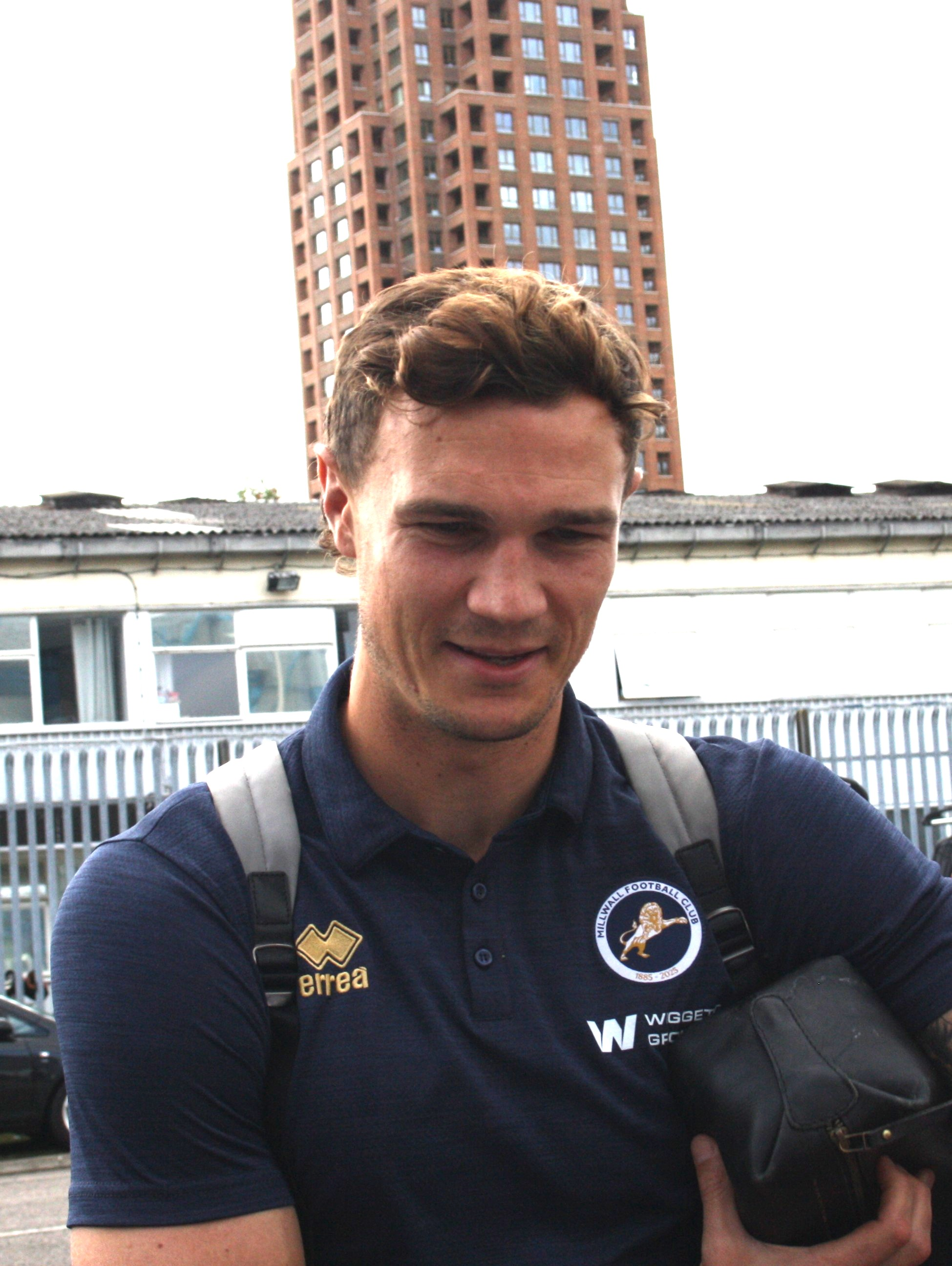
- Jake Cooper in 2025.

Personal information
- Full name: Jake Matthew Cooper
- Date of birth: 3 February 1995 (age 31)
- Place of birth: Bracknell, England
- Height: 6 ft 6 in (1.99 m)
- Position: Centre-back

Team information
- Current team: Millwall
- Number: 5

Youth career
- 2009–2014: Reading

Senior career*
Years	Team	Apps	(Gls)
2014–2017	Reading	42	(4)
2017	→ Millwall (loan)	15	(2)
2017–	Millwall	398	(32)

International career
2013	England U18	1	(0)
2013	England U19	2	(0)
2016	England U20	1	(0)
- * Club domestic league appearances and goals as of 21:43, 31 October 2026 (UTC)

Jake Matthew Cooper (born 3 February 1995) is an English professional footballer who plays as a centre-back and captains EFL Championship club Millwall.

== Club career ==
=== Early life and career ===
Cooper was born in Bracknell, Berkshire, and attended The Forest School, Winnersh. He joined the Reading F.C. Academy as a 14-year-old in 2009, going on to sign his first professional contract with the club in June 2013, on a contract going through to the end of the 2015–16 season.

Cooper made his debut, for Reading in their 1–0 Championship victory over Ipswich Town on 16 August 2014, coming on as an 87th-minute substitute for Nick Blackman. He scored his first goals for Reading on 29 November, in a 2–1 win away to Norwich City.

On 8 October 2015, Cooper extended his contract with the club until June 2018.

=== Millwall ===
On 19 January 2017, Cooper joined League One club Millwall on loan until the end of the 2016–17 season.

Cooper signed a three-year contract for Millwall on 28 July 2017.

He was named Millwall Player of the Year for the 2025–26 season.

Cooper is third on the list of all time appearance makers for Millwall.

== Personal life ==
Cooper's father is former Reading defender Alan Cooper, and his nephew Louie Holzman is also a product of the Reading youth system.

== International career ==
Cooper has represented England at under-18, under-19 and under-20 levels. His first call-up came in February 2013 for the under-18 game against Belgium, in which he made his debut.

Cooper earned his first England under-20 call-up in March 2016, making his debut against in a 2–1 defeat to Canada on 27 March.

== Career statistics ==
As of match played 31 October 2026

Appearances and goals by club, season and competition
Club	Season	League			FA Cup		League Cup		Other		Total	
Club	Season	Division	Apps	Goals	Apps	Goals	Apps	Goals	Apps	Goals	Apps	Goals
Reading	2014–15	Championship	15	2	2	0	2	0	—		19	2
Reading	2015–16	Championship	24	2	5	0	1	0	—		30	2
Reading	2016–17	Championship	3	0	0	0	2	0	0	0	5	0
Reading	Total		42	4	7	0	5	0	0	0	54	4
Reading U23	2016–17	—			—		—		2 (Note: Appearances in EFL Trophy)	0	2	0
Millwall (loan)	2016–17	League One	15	2	3	0	—		—		18	2
Millwall	2017–18	Championship	38	4	2	0	2	0	—		42	4
Millwall	2018–19	Championship	46	6	4	1	1	0	—		51	7
Millwall	2019–20	Championship	46	3	2	0	1	0	—		49	3
Millwall	2020–21	Championship	42	1	2	0	2	0	—		46	1
Millwall	2021–22	Championship	42	4	1	0	3	0	—		46	4
Millwall	2022–23	Championship	46	3	1	0	1	0	—		48	3
Millwall	2023–24	Championship	44	2	1	0	1	0	—		46	2
Millwall	2024–25	Championship	36	3	3	0	1	0	—		40	3
Millwall	2025–26	Championship	45	4	1	0	1	0	2 (Note: Appearances in EFL Championship play-offs)	0	49	4
Millwall	2026–27	Championship	13	2	0	0	3	2	—		16	4
Millwall	Total		398	32	17	1	16	2	2	0	433	35
Career total			455	38	27	1	21	2	4	0	507	41

== Honours ==
Millwall

- EFL League One play-offs: 2017

Individual

- Millwall Player of the Year: 2025–26
