= Jenson Metcalfe =

English footballer (born 2004)

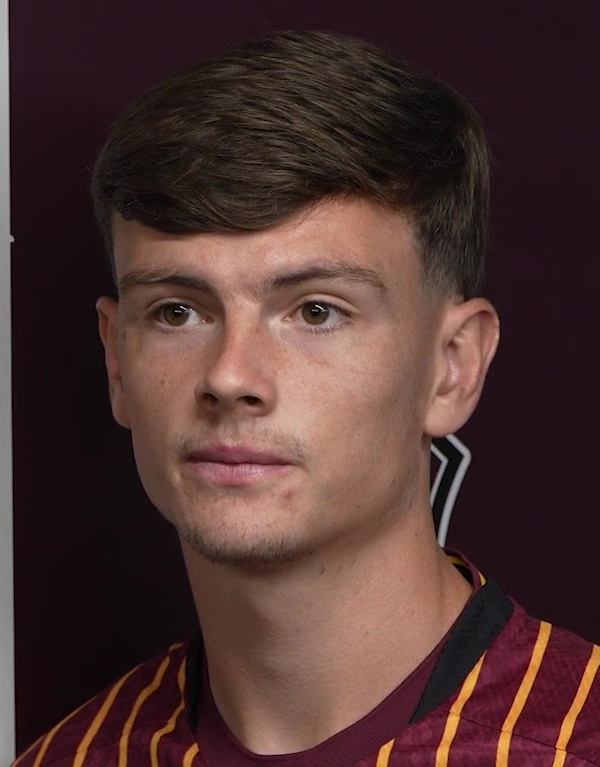
- Metcalfe with Bradford City in 2025

Personal information
- Full name: Jenson Thomas John Metcalfe
- Date of birth: 6 September 2004 (age 22)
- Place of birth: Wigan, England
- Height: 1.83 m (6 ft 0 in)
- Position: Midfielder

Team information
- Current team: Millwall
- Number: 14

Youth career
- –2024: Everton

Senior career*
Years	Team	Apps	(Gls)
2024–2025	Everton	0	(0)
2024–2025	→ Chesterfield (loan)	30	(1)
2025–2026	Bradford City	41	(2)
2026–	Millwall	3	(0)
- * Club domestic league appearances and goals as of 1 September 2026 (UTC)

Jenson Thomas John Metcalfe (born 6 September 2004) is an English professional footballer who plays as a midfielder for EFL Championship club Millwall.

== Career ==
=== Everton ===
He was born in Wigan. He joined the Everton youth academy at the age of five years-old and signed his first professional contract shortly after his seventeenth birthday. He suffered a cruciate knee ligament injury in early 2022 but later that year signed a new four-year contract with the club. Whilst still a teenager, he became a regular player for the club's U21 side and featured in the Premier League 2 during the 2023-24 season 18 times, contributing two goals and four assists.

He was named among the match-day substitutes for Everton on the opening day of the 2024–25 Premier League season at home against Brighton and Hove Albion on 17 August 2024.

On 30 August 2024, Metcalfe joined EFL League Two club Chesterfield on a season-long loan deal.

=== Bradford City ===
On 24 July 2025, Metcalfe signed for newly promoted EFL League One club Bradford City on a three-year deal for an undisclosed fee. He scored his first goal for the club on 29 December 2025, in a 1–0 home victory against Port Vale. He won three awards at the 2025 to 2026 end of season awards.

=== Millwall ===
On 16 June 2026, Metcalfe signed for Millwall on a "long-term" contract for an undisclosed fee.

== Career statistics ==
As of end of 2025–26 season

Appearances and goals by club, season and competition
Club	Season	League			FA Cup		EFL Cup		Other		Total	
Club	Season	Division	Apps	Goals	Apps	Goals	Apps	Goals	Apps	Goals	Apps	Goals
Everton U21	2023–24	—			—		—		3 (Note: Appearance(s) in EFL Trophy)	0	3	0
Everton U21	2024–25	—			—		—		1	0	1	0
Everton U21	Total		—		—		—		4	0	4	0
Everton	2024–25	Premier League	0	0	0	0	0	0	—		0	0
Chesterfield (loan)	2024–25	League Two	30	1	1	0	—		1	0	32	1
Bradford City	2025–26	League One	41	2	0	0	2	0	6 (Note: Four appearance in EFL Trophy, two appearances in League One play-offs)	0	49	2
Millwall	2026–27	Championship	0	0	0	0	0	0	—		0	0
Career total			71	3	1	0	2	0	11	0	85	3
