= Raees Bangura-Williams =

English association football player

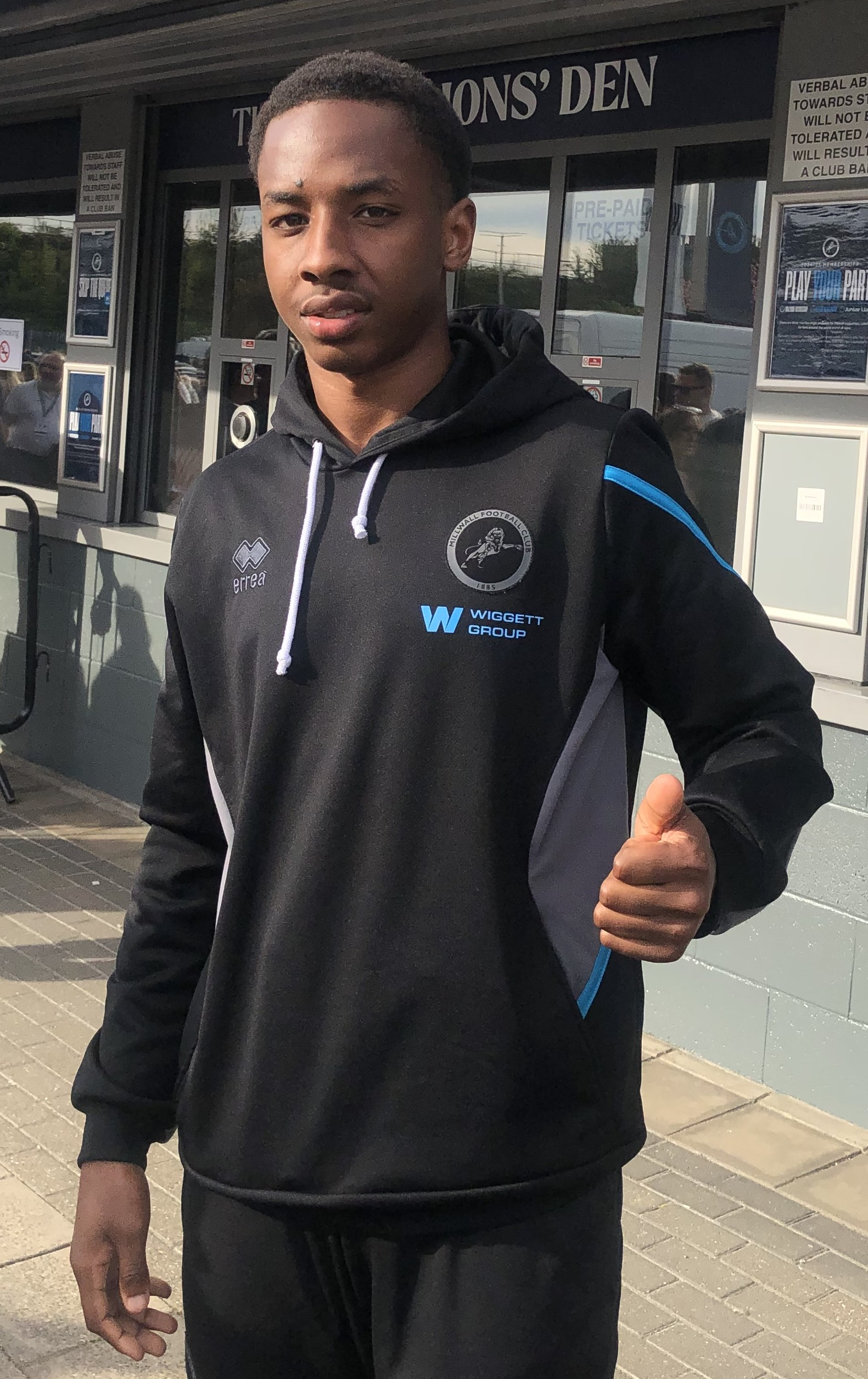
- Raees Bangura-Williams in 2025.

Personal information
- Full name: Ra'ees Mekhi Elijah Bangura-Williams
- Date of birth: 2 July 2004 (age 22)
- Place of birth: Lambeth, England
- Height: 1.80 m (5 ft 11 in)
- Position: Attacking midfielder

Team information
- Current team: Cambridge United (on loan from Millwall)
- Number: 44

Youth career
- 2020–2021: Tooting & Mitcham United
- 2023–2025: Millwall

Senior career*
Years	Team	Apps	(Gls)
2021–2023	Tooting & Mitcham United	32	(3)
2023–	Millwall	24	(1)
2026–	→ Cambridge United (loan)	11	(0)

International career^{‡}
2025	England U20	2	(0)
2026-	Sierra Leone	0	(0)
- * Club domestic league appearances and goals as of 08:28, 7 November 2026 (UTC) ‡ National team caps and goals as of 09:46, 1 July 2025 (UTC)

Raees Mekhi Elijah Bangura-Williams (born 2 July 2004) is an English professional footballer who plays as an attacking midfielder for EFL League One club Cambridge United, on loan from EFL Championship club Millwall.

== Career ==
He was at Chelsea in their pre-academy from five to eight years-old. He signed at Watford when he was at under-nine level. Throughout his teenage years he trained with clubs such as Tottenham Hotspur and with Norwich City without progressing with the clubs due to his slight build. He played non-league for Tooting & Mitcham United from the age of 16 years-old and made his debut in the first team at the age of 17. He had further trials with clubs such as Brentford, Middlesbrough, Fleetwood and Millwall, and despite initially being turned down, he signed with Millwall in December 2023.

He signed a new long-term contract with Millwall in January 2025. He made a goalscoring debut for Millwall, appearing as a second-half substitute to score in a 3-0 win in the FA Cup against Dagenham and Redbridge on 13 January 2025. The following week, he made his EFL Championship debut as a second-half substitute against Hull City. He made his first EFL Championship start in a 2-2 draw against Cardiff City on 21 January 2025.

On 13 May 2025, Bangura-Williams signed a "long-term contract" with Millwall. On 13 September 2025, he scored his first goal for Millwall with an equaliser against rivals, Charlton Athletic, having a 2nd goal disallowed for handball, as the game ended in a 1-1 draw.

== International career ==
On 24 March 2025, Bangura-Williams made his England U20 debut as a substitute during a 2-2 draw with Switzerland in Marbella

== Personal life ==
Bangura-Williams was born in the London Borough of Lambeth and was raised in Park Langley. His father is an amateur football manager who was originally from Sierra Leone.

== Career statistics ==
As of match played 6 November 2026

Appearances and goals by club, season and competition
Club	Season	League			FA Cup		League Cup		Other		Total	
Club	Season	Division	Apps	Goals	Apps	Goals	Apps	Goals	Apps	Goals	Apps	Goals
Tooting & Mitcham United	2021–22	Isthmian League South Central Division	6	0	0	0	—		3 (Note: Two Appearances in Alan Turvey Trophy and one in London Senior Cup)	0	9	0
Tooting & Mitcham United	2022–23	Isthmian League South Central Division	26	4	0	0	—		2 (Note: One Appearance in Alan Turvey Trophy and one in London Senior Cup)	0	28	4
Tooting & Mitcham United	Total		32	4	0	0	—		5	0	37	4
Millwall	2024–25	Championship	10	0	3	1	0	0	—		13	1
Millwall	2025–26	Championship	14	1	1	0	3	0	—		18	1
Millwall	Total		24	1	4	1	3	0	0	0	31	2
Cambridge United (loan)	2026–27	League One	11	0	1	0	—		2	1	14	1
Career total			67	5	5	1	3	0	7	1	82	7
