= Derek Mazou-Sacko =

French footballer (born 2004)

Personal information
- Full name: Derek Youri Jean Etienne Mazou-Sacko
- Date of birth: 6 October 2004 (age 22)
- Place of birth: Sarcelles, France
- Height: 1.86 m (6 ft 1 in)
- Position: Central midfielder

Team information
- Current team: Millwall
- Number: 49

Youth career
- 2011–2013: AAS Sarcelles
- 2013–2014: Saint-Brice FC
- 2014–2017: AAS Sarcelles
- 2017–2023: Troyes

Senior career*
Years	Team	Apps	(Gls)
2021–2024	Troyes B	32	(5)
2021–2024	Troyes	13	(0)
2024	→ Nancy (loan)	16	(1)
2024–2025	Rodez	34	(1)
2025–	Millwall	21	(1)

International career
2021–2022	France U18	5	(1)
- * Club domestic league appearances and goals as of 24 April 2026

Derek Youri Jean Etienne Mazou-Sacko (born 6 October 2004) is a French professional footballer who plays as a central midfielder for EFL Championship club Millwall.

== Club career ==
On 18 December 2021, Mazou-Sacko made his professional debut for Troyes in a Coupe de France match against Nancy. The match ended in a 4–2 penalty shoot-out victory for Nancy after a 1–1 draw.

On 11 July 2024, Mazou-Sacko signed a three-year contract with Rodez.

On 31 August 2025, Mazou-Sacko joined Millwall on a long-term contract for an undisclosed fee.

== International career ==
Born in France, Mazou-Sacko is Ivorian by descent. He is a France youth international, and has represented his country at under-18 level.

== Career statistics ==
As of match played 11 May 2026

Appearances and goals by club, season and competition
Club	Season	League			National cup (Note: Includes Coupe de France, FA Cup)		League cup (Note: Includes EFL Cup)		Other		Total	
Club	Season	Division	Apps	Goals	Apps	Goals	Apps	Goals	Apps	Goals	Apps	Goals
Troyes	2021–22	Ligue 1	2	0	1	0	—		—		3	0
Troyes	2022–23	Ligue 1	1	0	1	0	—		—		2	0
Troyes	2023–24	Ligue 2	10	0	0	0	—		—		10	0
Troyes	Total		13	0	2	0	—		—		15	0
Nancy (loan)	2023–24	Championnat National	16	1	0	0	—		—		16	1
Rodez	2024–25	Ligue 2	31	1	0	0	—		—		31	1
Rodez	2025–26	Ligue 2	3	0	0	0	—		—		3	0
Rodez	Total		34	0	0	0	—		—		34	0
Millwall	2025–26	Championship	21	1	0	0	1	0	2 (Note: Appearances in EFL Championship play-offs)	0	24	1
Career total			84	3	2	0	1	0	2	0	89	3
