= Kyrell Lisbie =

English footballer (born 2003)

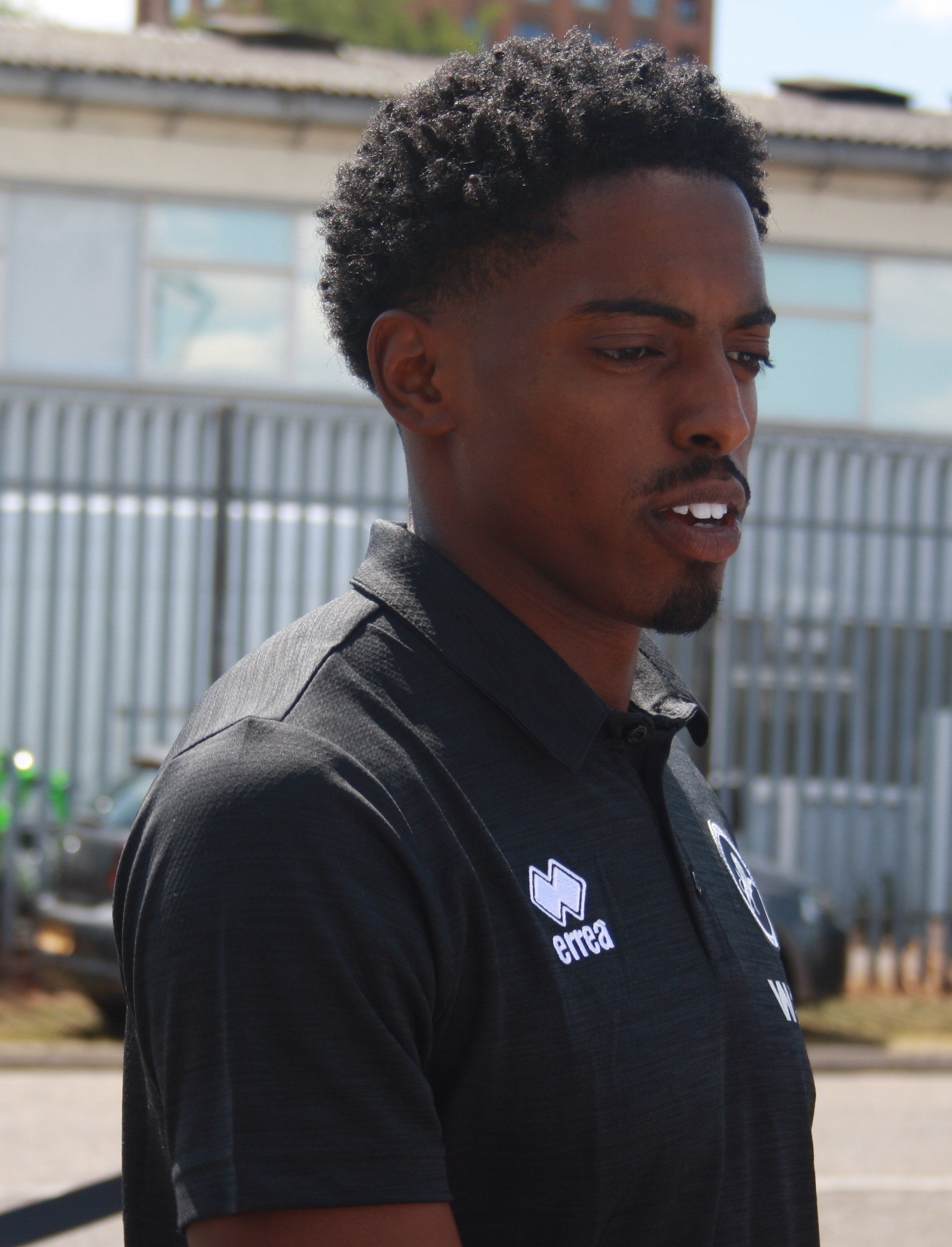
- Lisbie in 2026

Personal information
- Full name: Kyrell Jeremiah Lisbie
- Date of birth: 1 December 2003 (age 22)
- Place of birth: London, England
- Position: Winger

Team information
- Current team: Millwall
- Number: 22

Youth career
- 2016–2017: Leyton Orient
- Shield Academy
- 2020–2021: Cray Valley Paper Mills
- 2021–2022: Watford

Senior career*
Years	Team	Apps	(Gls)
2021	Cray Valley Paper Mills	0	(0)
2022–2023	Woodford Town	3	(1)
2023	Welling United	12	(2)
2023–2024	Cray Valley Paper Mills	29	(19)
2024–2025	Braintree Town	40	(13)
2025–2026	Peterborough United	44	(11)
2026–	Millwall	12	(3)
- * Club domestic league appearances and goals as of 09:08, 22 November 2026 (UTC)

Kyrell Jeremiah Lisbie (born 1 December 2003) is an English professional footballer who plays as a winger for EFL Championship club Millwall.

== Early and personal life ==
Born in London, Lisbie is the son of former Jamaica international footballer Kevin Lisbie. His twin brother, Kyreece, is also a professional footballer, and the two would post videos to social media platform TikTok, where their content switched from video game FIFA highlights to documenting their careers.

== Career ==
=== Early career ===
Lisbie began his career alongside his brother Kyreece at Leyton Orient, a club their father had played for. Having struggled with injuries, they were both relegated to the year group below them, before being released in 2017 after eighteen months with the club. Trials with Colchester United, Watford and Millwall followed, but after these were all unsuccessful, they played Sunday league football with Shield Academy. Their father, Kevin, ensured they did not feature often in organised football, preferring to train them individually.

In 2020 they joined the under-23 side of Cray Valley Paper Mills, a club competing in the Isthmian League South Central, the eighth tier of English football. Both brothers played briefly for the first team, with Kyrell replacing his father as a substitute in two London Senior Cup games, against Glebe and AFC Wimbledon, before a trial with Premier League side West Ham United. Despite the trial scheduled to last one week, it was extended to six, but despite scoring against Watford in a game, Lisbie was not offered a contract. Instead they trialled again with Watford, and were offered contracts with the club after five weeks of training.

=== Semi-professional career ===
Having been released at the end of the 2021–22 season, Lisbie dropped down to sign for Woodford Town in the Essex Senior Football League. Having featured briefly for the club, he moved to National League South club Welling United in January 2023. He scored twice for Welling United in their 3–0 win against Hampton & Richmond Borough on 25 April 2023, his only goals for the club.

In August of the same year, Lisbie returned to Cray Valley PM on a free transfer. When drawn in the first round of the FA Cup against his father Kevin's former club Charlton Athletic, Lisbie stated that the tie had been the one he was hoping for. In the match on 5 November 2023, Lisbie's cross early in the second half deflected off Charlton Athletic defender Lucas Ness to make the score 1–1, but he was substituted off minutes later after sustaining an injury. In the replay, he scored a penalty shortly before half-time to again make the score 1–1, though he was unable to prevent Cray Valley falling to a 6–1 defeat. Cray Valley announced Lisbie's departure at the end of the 2023–24 season.

On 6 June 2024 he was announced as a new signing for newly-promoted National League club Braintree Town. In March 2025 he was joined at the club by his brother Kyreece, who joined on loan from Colchester United. At the end of the season, following impressive performances, he was named as the Sportsbeat Young Player of the Year, given to the best young player in the National League, as well as being Braintree Town's player of the year.

=== Peterborough United ===
On 29 May 2025, Lisbie signed for EFL League One club Peterborough United, penning a three-year deal and marking a rise from semi-professional to professional football. On 30 September 2025 he scored his first goals for the club, scoring a hat-trick in the EFL Trophy.

In April 2026, he signed a new long-term four-year deal with the Posh.

=== Millwall ===
On 26 July 2026, Lisbie signed a long-term deal for Championship club Millwall.

== Style of play ==
Predominantly a left-winger, Lisbie has stated that he is comfortable playing anywhere in the front three.

== Career statistics ==
As of match played 21 November 2026

Appearances and goals by club, season and competition
Club	Season	League			FA Cup		EFL Cup		Other		Total	
Club	Season	Division	Apps	Goals	Apps	Goals	Apps	Goals	Apps	Goals	Apps	Goals
Cray Valley PM	2020–21	Isthmian League South Central	0	0	0	0	–		2 (Note: Appearances in the London Senior Cup)	0	2	0
Woodford Town	2022–23	Essex Senior Football League	3	1	1	0	–		3 (Note: Two appearances in the FA Vase, one appearance in the Errington Challenge Cup)	0	7	1
Welling United	2022–23	National League South	12	2	0	0	–		0	0	12	2
Cray Valley PM	2023–24	Isthmian League South Central	29	19	10	8	–		5 (Note: Four appearances and two goals in the FA Trophy, one appearance in the Kent Senior Cup)	2	44	29
Braintree Town	2024–25	National League	40	13	2	0	–		7 (Note: Six appearances and three goals in the National League Cup, one appearance and one goal in the FA Trophy)	4	49	17
Peterborough United	2025–26	League One	44	11	2	0	1	0	4 (Note: Appearances in the EFL Trophy)	3	51	14
Millwall	2026–27	Championship	12	3	0	0	1	0	0	0	13	3
Career total			140	49	15	8	2	0	21	9	178	66
