= Zak Sturge =

English footballer (born 2004)

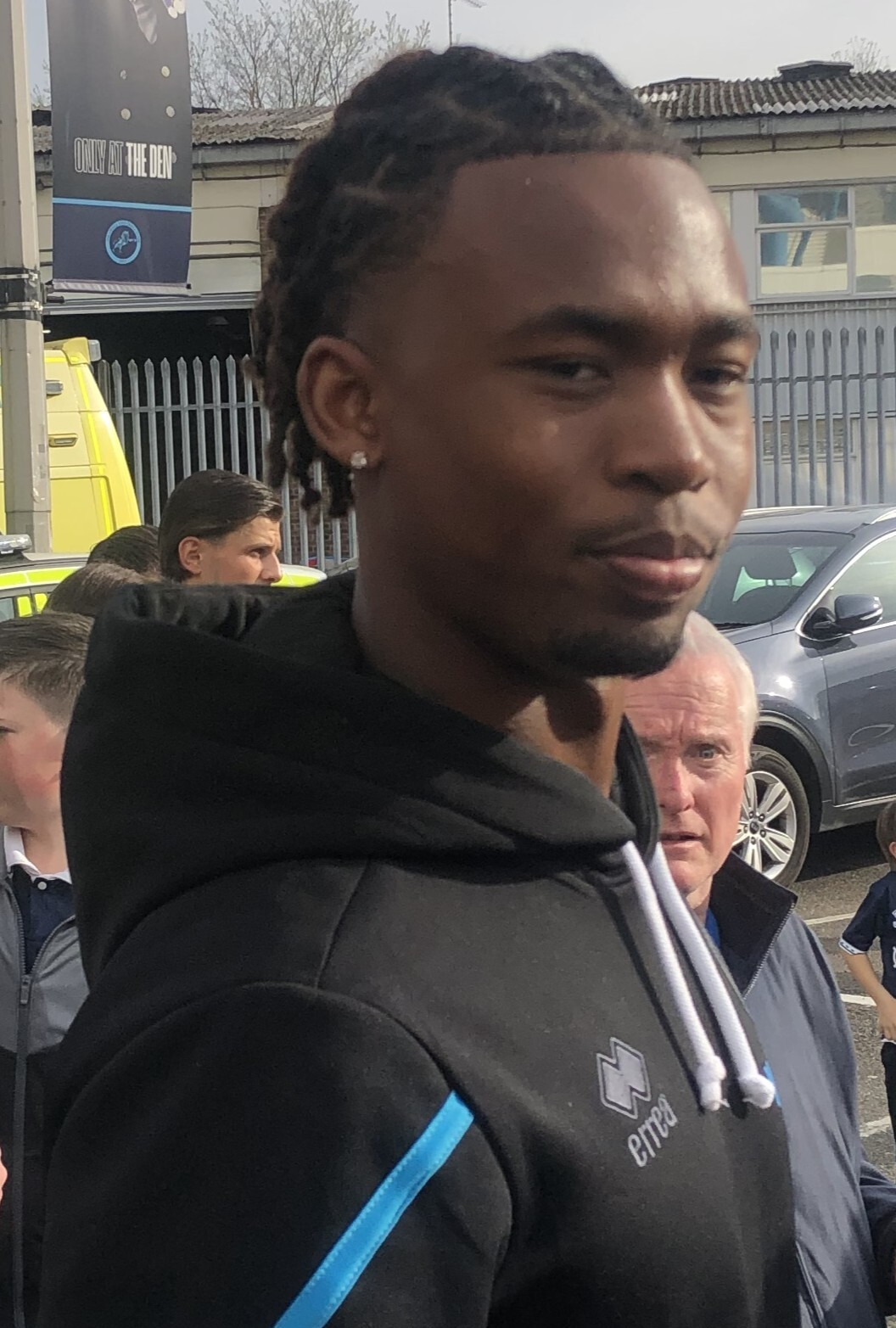
- Zak Sturge in 2025.

Personal information
- Full name: Zak Norton Sturge
- Date of birth: 15 June 2004 (age 22)
- Place of birth: Hillingdon, England
- Height: 1.88 m (6 ft 2 in)
- Position: Left-back

Team information
- Current team: Millwall
- Number: 3

Youth career
- Cre8tive Football Academy
- 2019–2022: Brighton & Hove Albion
- 2022–2023: Chelsea

Senior career*
Years	Team	Apps	(Gls)
2023–2025	Chelsea	0	(0)
2023–2024	→ Peterborough United (loan)	8	(0)
2025	→ Millwall (loan)	5	(0)
2025–	Millwall	41	(1)

International career^{‡}
2021–2022	England U18	6	(0)
- * Club domestic league appearances and goals as of 31 August 2026 (UTC) ‡ National team caps and goals as of 17:10, 17 March 2025 (UTC)

Zak Norton Sturge (born 15 June 2004) is an English professional footballer who plays as a left-back for EFL Championship club Millwall.

== Club career ==
Born in London, Sturge started his career with the Cre8tive Football Academy, before joining Premier League side Brighton & Hove Albion in 2019. After three years in Brighton, he declined the offer of a contract extension, and announced his departure from the club in July 2022.

After being linked with a host of German Bundesliga sides, as well as English sides Leeds United and Chelsea, he signed with the latter as a free agent in August 2022. Since signing, he has gone on to train with the first team.

On 31 August 2023, Sturge joined League One club Peterborough United on loan until the end of the 2023–24 season. On 2 January 2024, he was recalled by Chelsea.

On 3 February 2025, Sturge joined Championship side Millwall on loan until the end of the 2024–25 season.

On 14 July 2025, Sturge rejoined Millwall on a permanent deal, signing for an undisclosed fee. On 4 October 2025, he scored his first goal for Millwall in a 3–0 victory over West Bromwich Albion.

== International career ==
Sturge is eligible to represent both England and Guyana at international level. He was called up to the England national under-18 football team in late 2021, and has gone on to make six appearances.

== Career statistics ==
=== Club ===
As of match played 11 May 2026

Appearances and goals by club, season and competition
Club	Season	League			FA Cup		EFL Cup		Europe		Other		Total	
Club	Season	Division	Apps	Goals	Apps	Goals	Apps	Goals	Apps	Goals	Apps	Goals	Apps	Goals
Chelsea U21	2022–23	—			—		—		—		4 (Note: Appearances in EFL Trophy)	0	4	0
Chelsea U21	2024–25	—			—		—		—		1	0	1	0
Total		—			—		—		—		5	0	5	0
Peterborough United (loan)	2023–24	League One	8	0	2	0	1	0	—		4	0	15	0
Millwall (loan)	2024–25	Championship	5	0	0	0	0	0	—		0	0	5	0
Millwall	2025–26	Championship	38	1	0	0	2	0	—		2 (Note: Appearances in EFL Championship play-offs)	0	42	1
Career total			51	1	2	0	3	0	0	0	11	0	67	1
