= George Evans (footballer, born 2005) =

English footballer (born 2005)

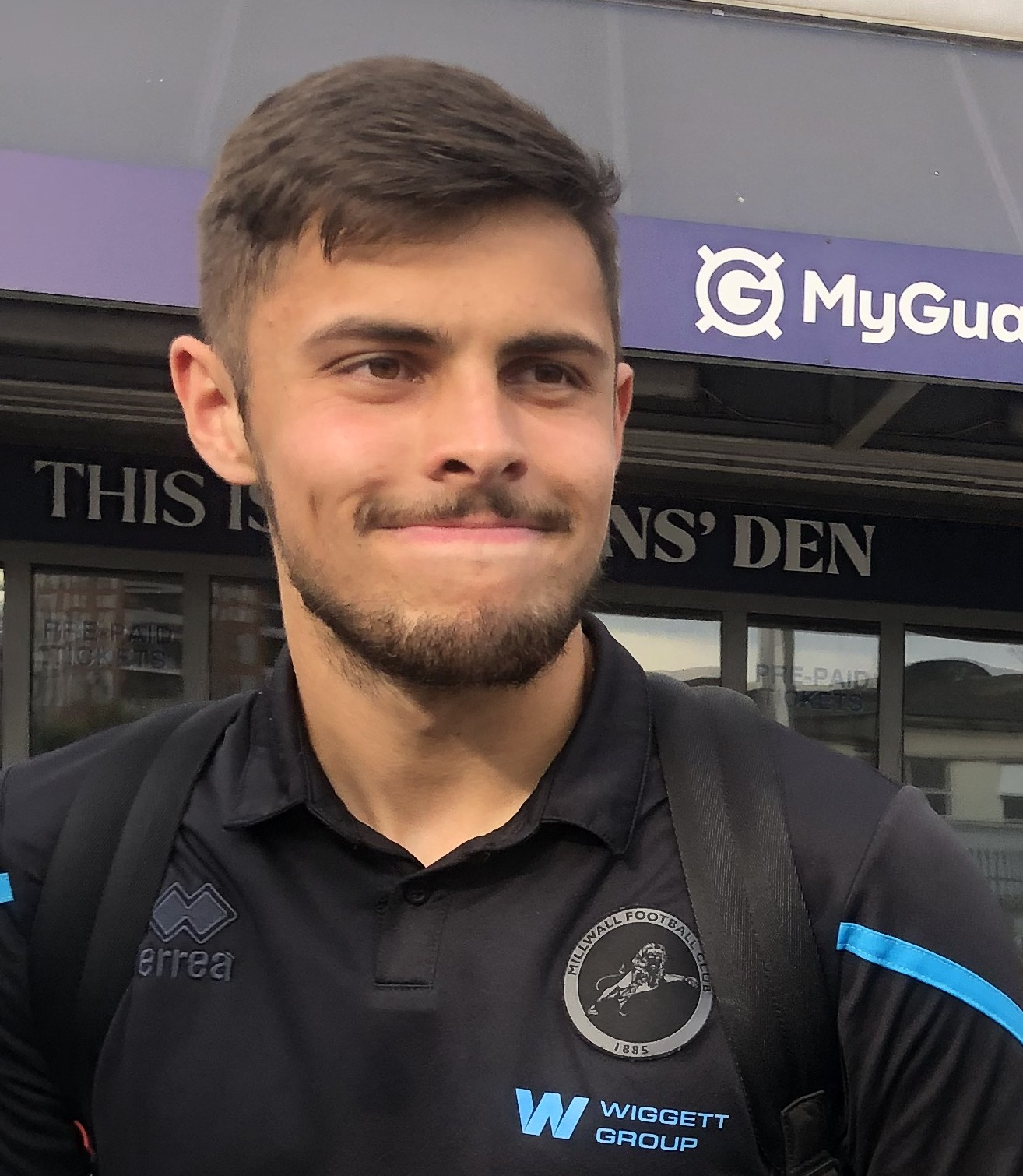
- Evans in 2025

Personal information
- Full name: George David Clark Evans
- Date of birth: 16 May 2005 (age 21)
- Height: 6 ft 2 in (1.87 m)
- Position: Goalkeeper

Team information
- Current team: Millwall
- Number: 41

Youth career
- 2023–2025: Millwall

Senior career*
Years	Team	Apps	(Gls)
2024–	Millwall	4	(0)
2024	→ Broadbridge Heath (loan)	5	(0)
2025	→ Sutton United (loan)	1	(0)
2025–2026	→ Hartlepool United (loan)	13	(0)
- * Club domestic league appearances and goals as of 14:48, 12 January 2026 (UTC)

George David Clark Evans (born 16 May 2005) is an English professional footballer who plays as a goalkeeper for EFL Championship club Millwall.

== Career ==
Evans started his career with the Millwall academy, earning first-team experience on loan with Broadbridge Heath and Sutton United.

After Millwall first-team goalkeepers Lukas Jensen and Liam Roberts were unavailable due to injury and a six game ban respectively, Evans got a chance to start for Millwall; he debuted in a 4–1 defeat to Blackburn Rovers. On 26 April, he kept a first clean-sheet for the club in a 1–0 victory over Swansea City, being voted Man of the Match by the club's supporters. In July 2025, he signed a new long-term contract with the club.

On 3 October 2025, Evans joined National League club Hartlepool United on loan. On 6 November, this loan spell was extended until 4 January 2026.

== Career statistics ==
As of match played 10 January 2026

Appearances and goals by club, season and competition
Club	Season	League			FA Cup		League Cup		Other		Total	
Club	Season	Division	Apps	Goals	Apps	Goals	Apps	Goals	Apps	Goals	Apps	Goals
Millwall	2023–24	Championship	0	0	0	0	0	0	—		0	0
Millwall	2024–25	Championship	4	0	0	0	0	0	—		2	0
Millwall	Total		4	0	0	0	0	0	0	0	2	0
Broadbridge Heath (loan)	2023–24	Isthmian League South East Division	5	0	—		—		0	0	5	0
Sutton United (loan)	2024–25	National League	1	0	0	0	—		2 (Note: One appearance in FA Trophy, one appearance in National League Cup)	0	3	0
Hartlepool United (loan)	2025–26	National League	13	0	2	0	—		0	0	15	0
Career total			23	0	2	0	0	0	2	0	27	0
