= Zian Flemming =

Dutch footballer (born 1998)

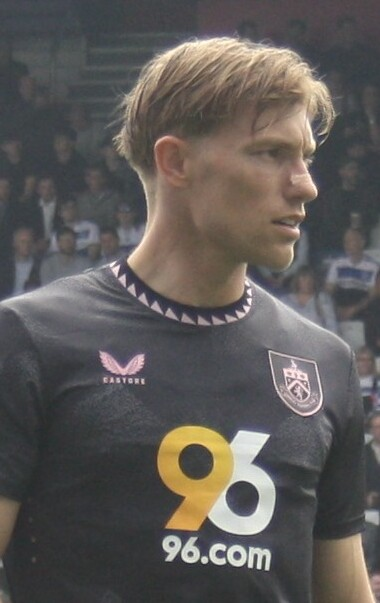
- Flemming with Burnley in 2025

Personal information
- Full name: Zian Flemming
- Date of birth: 1 August 1998 (age 28)
- Place of birth: Amsterdam, Netherlands
- Height: 1.85 m (6 ft 1 in)
- Positions: Forward; attacking midfielder

Team information
- Current team: Ipswich Town
- Number: 9

Youth career
- 2005–2006: ZSGOWMS
- 2006–2008: Pancratius
- 2008–2017: Ajax

Senior career*
Years	Team	Apps	(Gls)
2017–2018	Jong Ajax	25	(6)
2018–2020	PEC Zwolle	29	(2)
2019–2020	→ NEC (loan)	24	(13)
2020–2022	Fortuna Sittard	61	(24)
2022–2025	Millwall	89	(22)
2024–2025	→ Burnley (loan)	35	(12)
2025–2026	Burnley	31	(13)
2026–	Ipswich Town	5	(2)
- * Club domestic league appearances and goals as of 16:49, 17 October 2026

Zian Flemming (born 1 August 1998) is a Dutch professional footballer who plays as a forward or attacking midfielder for Premier League side Ipswich Town.

== Club career ==
=== Jong Ajax ===
Flemming played in the youth departments of ZSGOWMS, RKSV Pancratius and Ajax. He made his professional debut for Jong Ajax on 1 September 2017 in a game against Jong PSV and scored on his debut. Flemming made 25 appearances during the 2017–18 season and won the Eerste Divisie title with Jong Ajax.

=== PEC Zwolle ===
On 2 May 2018, Flemming signed a three-year contract with PEC Zwolle, starting from 1 July 2018. There he made 28 appearances and six goals in his first season. His most notable performance came in the KNVB Cup against De Graafschap, where he scored four goals in a 5–2 victory.

==== Loan to NEC ====
On 2 September 2019, Flemming was sent on loan to NEC for the 2019–20 season, who were competing in the second-tier Eerste Divisie. On 13 September, he made his debut in the 2–2 away draw against Den Bosch. He scored his first two goals for NEC on 27 September, when the club drew 3–3 against Go Ahead Eagles. With 13 goals, he became club top scorer of NEC for the 2019–20 season. As the season ended, he returned to PEC Zwolle.

=== Fortuna Sittard ===
On 26 August 2020, Flemming signed a four-year contract with Eredivisie club Fortuna Sittard. He made his debut on 12 September in a 2–0 away loss to Twente. On 26 September, he scored his first two goals in a 3–3 home draw against AZ, one of them coming deep into injury time to secure the one point for Fortuna. He finished the season with 35 appearances, in which he scored 25 goals, as Fortuna finished in 11th place.

=== Millwall ===
On 25 June 2022, Flemming joined Championship club Millwall on a three-year contract for a fee of £1.7 million rising to £2.5 million. He made his competitive debut for the club on 30 July, the opening day of the season, replacing George Honeyman in the 76th minute of a 2–0 home victory against Stoke City. On 17 September, he netted his debut goal for the Lions, breaking the deadlock in the 14th minute with a header from Scott Malone's cross. The ball deflected off keeper Daniel Grimshaw and scored his team's second in a 2–1 victory against Blackpool. He secured his second goal on 5 October during a match against Rotherham United from a long-distance strike. Just three days later, he achieved his first brace for Millwall, propelling them to a 2–0 victory against Middlesbrough at The Den. He continued his impressive form the following week, on 15 October, by netting the decisive goal that secured a 2–1 away win against Bristol City. This marked Flemming's fifth goal in five consecutive games. On 12 November, Flemming scored his first hat-trick for the club, once again proving decisive in a 4–2 away victory against Preston North End. He concluded the season with 15 goals in 44 appearances across various competitions, securing the position of the team's second-highest goalscorer, behind only Tom Bradshaw. Millwall finished eighth in the league, narrowly missing the playoffs by just one point behind sixth-place Sunderland in the play-offs. In recognition of his contributions, Flemming was honoured as the Millwall Player of the Season in May 2023.

=== Burnley ===
On 31 August 2024, deadline day, Flemming joined EFL Championship side Burnley on a one-year loan deal with an obligation to buy at the end of the season, for a fee of £7million. He made his debut for the club on 14 September 2024, in a 1–0 win against Leeds United. He scored his first goal for the club on 23 October 2024, in a 1–1 draw with Hull City.

On 20 May 2025, Burnley announced the player would be joining the club on a permanent basis. He was club's top scorer in the 2025–26 season, netting 11 times in the Premiership, but could not prevent Burnley being relegated to the Championship.

=== Ipswich Town ===
On 1 September 2026, Flemming was transferred to Ipswich Town for £20 million.

== Career statistics ==
As of match played 17 October 2026

Appearances and goals by club, season and competition
Club	Season	League			National cup (Note: Includes KNVB Cup, FA Cup)		League cup (Note: Includes EFL Cup)		Other		Total	
Club	Season	Division	Apps	Goals	Apps	Goals	Apps	Goals	Apps	Goals	Apps	Goals
Jong Ajax	2017–18	Eerste Divisie	25	6	—		—		—		25	6
PEC Zwolle	2018–19	Eredivisie	25	2	3	4	—		—		28	6
PEC Zwolle	2019–20	Eredivisie	4	0	—		—		—		4	0
PEC Zwolle	Total		29	2	3	4	—		—		32	6
NEC (loan)	2019–20	Eerste Divisie	24	13	1	0	—		—		25	13
Fortuna Sittard	2020–21	Eredivisie	33	12	2	3	—		—		35	15
Fortuna Sittard	2021–22	Eredivisie	28	12	0	0	—		—		28	12
Fortuna Sittard	Total		61	24	2	3	—		—		63	27
Millwall	2022–23	Championship	43	15	1	0	0	0	—		44	15
Millwall	2023–24	Championship	46	7	1	1	1	0	—		48	8
Millwall	Total		89	22	2	1	1	0	—		92	23
Burnley (loan)	2024–25	Championship	35	12	2	2	—		—		37	14
Burnley	2025–26	Premier League	29	11	1	0	2	1	—		32	12
Burnley	2026–27	Championship	2	2	—		2	1	—		4	3
Burnley	Burnley total		66	25	3	2	4	2	—		73	29
Ipswich Town	2026–27	Premier League	5	2	0	0	1	0	—		6	2
Career total			299	94	11	10	6	2	0	0	316	106

== Honours ==
Jong Ajax

- Eerste Divisie: 2017–18

Individual

- Millwall Player of the Season: 2022–23
- Burnley Player of the Season: 2025–26
