= 2022–23 Millwall F.C. season =

Millwall
2022–23 season
- Owner: Millwall Holdings
- Chairman: John Berylson
- Manager: Gary Rowett
- Stadium: The Den
- Championship: 8th
- FA Cup: Third round
- EFL Cup: First round
- Top goalscorer: League: Tom Bradshaw (17); All: Tom Bradshaw (17)
- Highest home attendance: 18,785 vs Norwich City, 4 March 2023, Championship
- Lowest home attendance: 11,463 vs Blackpool, 17 September 2022, Championship
Home colours	Away colours	Third colours

The 2022–23 season was the 138th season in the existence of Millwall Football Club, 96th consecutive season in the Football League, and 46th in the second tier. This was the club's sixth consecutive season in the Championship. In addition to the league where they finished eighth, they competed in the FA Cup and the EFL Cup. The attendance of 18,524 against Sunderland at The Den was the highest since an FA Cup game against Chelsea in 1995. That record was topped a month later against Norwich City, with 18,785 supporters at the Den.

== First-team squad ==
As of 31 January 2023

Note: Flags indicate national team as has been defined under FIFA eligibility rules. Players may hold more than one non-FIFA nationality.

No.	Name	Nat.	Position(s)	Date of birth (age)	Apps.	Goals	Year signed	Signed from	Transfer fee
Goalkeepers
1	George Long	(England)	GK	5 November 1993 (age 32)	25	0	2021	(England) Hull City	Free
27	Connal Trueman	(England)	GK	26 March 1996 (age 30)	0	0	2022	(England) Birmingham City	Free
33	Bartosz Białkowski	(Poland)	GK	6 July 1987 (aged 35)	147	0	2020	(England) Ipswich Town	£350,000
Defenders
2	Danny McNamara	(Republic of Ireland) (England)	RB/RM	27 December 1998 (aged 22)	78	2	2018	Academy	Trainee
3	Murray Wallace	(Scotland)	CB/LB	10 January 1993 (aged 28)	167	11	2018	(England) Scunthorpe United	Undisclosed
4	Shaun Hutchinson	(England)	CB/DM	23 November 1990 (aged 30)	230	13	2016	(England) Fulham	Free
5	Jake Cooper	(England)	CB	3 February 1995 (aged 26)	278	21	2017	(England) Reading	Undisclosed
11	Scott Malone	(England)	LB/LM	25 March 1991 (age 35)	171	14	2021	(England) Derby County	Free
15	Charlie Cresswell	(England)	CB	17 August 2002 (age 24)	23	4	2022	(England) Leeds United	Loan
34	Alex Mitchell	(England)	CB	7 October 2001 (age 25)	0	0	2020	Academy	Trainee
Midfielders
6	George Evans	(England)	CM/CB	13 December 1994 (aged 26)	50	2	2021	(England) Derby County	Undisclosed
8	Billy Mitchell	(England)	CM/RB	7 April 2001 (aged 20)	91	1	2019	Academy	Trainee
14	Tyler Burey	(England) (Jamaica)	ST/LM/RM	9 January 2001 (aged 20)	50	3	2019	(England) AFC Wimbledon	Free
16	Jamie Shackleton	(England)	CM/RB	8 October 1999 (age 27)	28	0	2022	(England) Leeds United	Loan
17	Callum Styles	(Hungary) (England)	CM/LB/LM	28 March 2000 (age 26)	16	1	2022	(England) Barnsley	Loan
18	Ryan Leonard	(England)	CM/RM/RB	24 May 1992 (aged 29)	122	5	2019	(England) Sheffield United	£1,500,000
23	George Saville	(Northern Ireland) (England)	CM/DM	1 June 1993 (age 33)	116	14	2021	(England) Middlesbrough	Undisclosed
39	George Honeyman	(England)	CM	8 September 1994 (age 32)	32	1	2022	(England) Hull City	Undisclosed
Forwards
7	Oliver Burke	(Scotland)	CF/RW/LW	7 April 1997 (age 29)	18	3	2023	(Germany) Werder Bremen	Loan
9	Tom Bradshaw	(Wales)	ST	27 July 1992 (aged 28)	144	82	2019	(England) Barnsley	£1,250,000
10	Zian Flemming	(Netherlands)	AM/ST	1 August 1999 (age 27)	30	13	2022	(Netherlands) Fortuna Sittard	£1,700,000
19	Duncan Watmore	(England)	CF	8 March 1994 (aged 29)	6	1	2023	(England) Middlesbrough	Undisclosed
20	Mason Bennett	(England)	LW/RW/ST	15 July 1996 (aged 26)	90	11	2020	(England) Derby County	Undisclosed
21	Andreas Voglsammer	(Germany)	ST/LW/RW	9 January 1992 (age 34)	28	1	2022	(Germany) Union Berlin	£1,080,000

== Statistics ==
As of 4 March 2023
Players with names in italics and marked * were on loan from another club for the whole of their season with Millwall.

No.	Pos	Nat	Player	Total		Championship		FA Cup		League Cup	
No.	Pos	Nat	Player	Apps	Goals	Apps	Goals	Apps	Goals	Apps	Goals
1	GK	(England) ENG	George Long	25	0	24+0	0	0+0	0	1+0	0
2	DF	(Republic of Ireland) IRL	Danny McNamara	31	0	28+1	0	1+0	0	1+0	0
3	DF	(Scotland) SCO	Murray Wallace	28	0	26+0	0	1+0	0	1+0	0
4	DF	(England) ENG	Shaun Hutchinson	20	0	15+3	0	1+0	0	1+0	0
5	DF	(England) ENG	Jake Cooper	34	3	31+1	3	0+1	0	0+1	0
6	MF	(England) ENG	George Evans	11	0	0+9	0	0+1	0	1+0	0
7	FW	(Scotland) SCO	Oliver Burke*	5	1	2+3	1	0+0	0	0+0	0
8	MF	(England) ENG	Billy Mitchell	25	0	24+1	0	0+0	0	0+0	0
9	FW	(Wales) WAL	Tom Bradshaw	29	13	24+3	13	1+0	0	1+0	0
10	FW	(Netherlands) NED	Zian Flemming	30	13	26+3	13	0+1	0	0+0	0
11	DF	(England) ENG	Scott Malone	22	0	11+10	0	0+0	0	0+1	0
14	MF	(England) ENG	Tyler Burey	21	1	7+13	1	0+1	0	0+0	0
15	DF	(England) ENG	Charlie Cresswell*	23	4	18+3	4	1+0	0	1+0	0
16	MF	(England) ENG	Jamie Shackleton*	28	0	16+11	0	1+0	0	0+0	0
17	MF	(Hungary) HUN	Callum Styles*	16	1	9+7	1	0+0	0	0+0	0
18	MF	(England) ENG	Ryan Leonard	12	0	4+7	0	0+0	0	1+0	0
19	FW	(England) ENG	Duncan Watmore	6	1	2+4	1	0+0	0	0+0	0
20	FW	(England) ENG	Mason Bennett	16	0	7+7	0	1+0	0	0+1	0
21	FW	(Germany) GER	Andreas Voglsammer	29	1	20+8	1	1+0	0	0+0	0
22	FW	(Republic of Ireland) IRL	Aidomo Emakhu	1	0	0+1	0	0+0	0	0+0	0
23	MF	(Northern Ireland) NIR	George Saville	30	1	22+6	1	1+0	0	1+0	0
25	FW	(England) ENG	Isaac Olaofe	3	0	0+2	0	0+0	0	0+1	0
33	GK	(Poland) POL	Bartosz Białkowski	11	0	10+0	0	1+0	0	0+0	0
39	MF	(England) ENG	George Honeyman	32	1	18+12	1	1+0	0	1+0	0
50	MF	(England) ENG	Romain Esse	6	0	0+5	0	0+1	0	0+0	0
Players who left the club:
7	FW	(Democratic Republic of the Congo) COD	Benik Afobe	19	2	8+11	2	0+0	0	0+0	0

=== Goals record ===
As of 4 March 2023

Rank	No.	Nat.	Po.	Name	Championship	FA Cup	League Cup	Total
1	9	(Wales)	ST	Tom Bradshaw	13	0	0	13
1	10	(Netherlands)	AM	Zian Flemming	13	0	0	13
3	15	(England)	CB	Charlie Cresswell	4	0	0	4
4	5	(England)	CB	Jake Cooper	3	0	0	3
5	7	(Democratic Republic of the Congo)	ST	Benik Afobe	2	0	0	2
6	7	(Scotland)	CF	Oliver Burke	1	0	0	1
6	14	(England)	LW	Tyler Burey	1	0	0	1
6	17	(Hungary)	CM	Callum Styles	1	0	0	1
6	19	(England)	CF	Duncan Watmore	1	0	0	1
6	21	(Germany)	ST	Andreas Voglsammer	1	0	0	1
6	23	(Northern Ireland)	CM	George Saville	1	0	0	1
6	39	(England)	AM	George Honeyman	1	0	0	1
Own Goals					3	0	0	3
Total					45	0	0	45

=== Disciplinary record ===
As of 4 March 2023

Rank	No.	Nat.	Po.	Name	Championship			FA Cup			League Cup			Total		
Rank	No.	Nat.	Po.	Name	Booked	(yellow card) (yellow-red card)	Sent off (straight red)	Booked	(yellow card) (yellow-red card)	Sent off (straight red)	Booked	(yellow card) (yellow-red card)	Sent off (straight red)	Booked	(yellow card) (yellow-red card)	Sent off (straight red)
1	2	(Republic of Ireland)	RB	Danny McNamara	7	0	0	1	0	0	0	0	0	8	0	0
2	3	(Scotland)	CB	Murray Wallace	7	0	0	0	0	0	0	0	0	7	0	0
3	5	(England)	CB	Jake Cooper	7	0	0	0	0	0	0	0	0	7	0	0
4	23	(Northern Ireland)	CM	George Saville	6	0	0	0	0	0	0	0	0	6	0	0
5	39	(England)	CM	George Honeyman	3	1	0	0	0	0	0	0	0	3	1	0
6	14	(England)	LW	Tyler Burey	4	0	0	0	0	0	0	0	0	4	0	0
6	15	(England)	CB	Charlie Cresswell	4	0	0	0	0	0	0	0	0	4	0	0
8	1	(England)	GK	George Long	3	0	0	0	0	0	0	0	0	3	0	0
8	9	(Wales)	ST	Tom Bradshaw	3	0	0	0	0	0	0	0	0	3	0	0
10	4	(England)	CB	Shaun Hutchinson	2	0	0	0	0	0	0	0	0	2	0	0
10	8	(England)	CM	Billy Mitchell	2	0	0	0	0	0	0	0	0	2	0	0
10	10	(Netherlands)	AM	Zian Flemming	2	0	0	0	0	0	0	0	0	2	0	0
10	17	(Hungary)	CM	Callum Styles	2	0	0	0	0	0	0	0	0	2	0	0
10	20	(England)	RW	Mason Bennett	2	0	0	0	0	0	0	0	0	2	0	0
15	7	(Democratic Republic of the Congo)	ST	Benik Afobe	1	0	0	0	0	0	0	0	0	1	0	0
15	11	(England)	LB	Scott Malone	1	0	0	0	0	0	0	0	0	1	0	0
15	16	(England)	CM	Jamie Shackleton	1	0	0	0	0	0	0	0	0	1	0	0
15	18	(England)	CM	Ryan Leonard	1	0	0	0	0	0	0	0	0	1	0	0
15	21	(Germany)	ST	Andreas Voglsammer	1	0	0	0	0	0	0	0	0	1	0	0
Total					59	1	0	1	0	0	0	0	0	60	1	0

== Transfers ==
=== In ===
Date	Pos	Player	Transferred from	Fee	Ref
25 June 2022	AM	(Netherlands) Zian Flemming	(Netherlands) Fortuna Sittard	£1,700,000	
28 June 2022	ST	(Democratic Republic of the Congo) Benik Afobe	(England) Stoke City	Undisclosed	
28 June 2022	AM	(England) George Honeyman	(England) Hull City	Undisclosed	
15 July 2022	CM	(England) Sha'mar Lawson	(England) Mansfield Town	Free Transfer	
4 August 2022	GK	(England) Connal Trueman	(England) Birmingham City	Free Transfer	
12 August 2022	ST	(Germany) Andreas Voglsammer	(Germany) Union Berlin	Undisclosed	
1 January 2023 (Note: The transfer was announced on 14 December, and would become official on January 1 once the transfer window re-opens.)	ST	(Republic of Ireland) Aidomo Emakhu	(Republic of Ireland) Shamrock Rovers	Undisclosed	
31 January 2023	RW	(England) Duncan Watmore	(England) Middlesbrough	Undisclosed	
3 February 2023	CB	(England) Frankie Hvid	(England) Bromley	Undisclosed	

=== Out ===
Date	Pos	Player	Transferred to	Fee	Ref
15 June 2022	RB	(Antigua and Barbuda) Mahlon Romeo	(England) Cardiff City	Undisclosed	
30 June 2022	MF	(England) Jayden Davis	(England) Crawley Town	Released	
30 June 2022	DF	(England) Bobby Dailly	(Scotland) St Johnstone	Released	
30 June 2022	LB	(England) Kai Garande	Unattached	Released	
30 June 2022	GK	(England) Ryan Hammond	(England) Nottingham Forest	Released	
30 June 2022	CM	(Egypt) Ramez Hefzalla	(Scotland) Peterhead	Released	
30 June 2022 (Note: The transfer was announced on 12 June, and would become official once his contract expired)	DM	(Netherlands) Maikel Kieftenbeld	(Netherlands) FC Emmen	Free Transfer	
30 June 2022	RW	(England) Connor Mahoney	(England) Huddersfield Town	Released	
30 June 2022	RB	(England) Dan Moss	(England) Woking	Released	
30 June 2022	ST	(Republic of Ireland) Sean O'Brien	(England) Forest Green Rovers	Released	
30 June 2022	CB	(Republic of Ireland) Alex Pearce	(England) AFC Wimbledon	Released	
30 June 2022	LB	(England) Junior Tiensia	(England) Gloucester City	Released	
30 June 2022 (Note: The transfer was announced on 23 June, and would become official once his contract expired)	RW	(England) Jed Wallace	(England) West Bromwich Albion	Free Transfer	
4 July 2022	ST	(England) Zak Lovelace	(Scotland) Rangers	Compensation	
1 January 2023 (Note: The transfer was announced on 30 December, and would become official on January 1, once the transfer window re-opens)	ST	(England) Isaac Olaofe	(England) Stockport County	Undisclosed	
5 January 2023	ST	(Democratic Republic of the Congo) Benik Afobe	(United Arab Emirates) Hatta Club	Mutual Consent	
13 January 2023	RB	(England) Hayden Muller	(Republic of Ireland) Dundalk	Undisclosed	

=== Loans in ===
Date	Pos	Player	Loaned from	On loan until	Ref
4 July 2022	CB	(England) Charlie Cresswell	(England) Leeds United	End of Season	
19 July 2022	CM	(England) Jamie Shackleton	(England) Leeds United	End of Season	
2 September 2022	CM	(Hungary) Callum Styles	(England) Barnsley	End of Season	
30 January 2023	CF	(Scotland) Oliver Burke	(Germany) Werder Bremen	End of Season	

=== Loans out ===
Date	Pos	Player	Loaned to	On loan until	Ref
6 July 2022	GK	(England) Joe Wright	(England) Bath City	End of Season	
27 July 2022	CB	(England) Alex Mitchell	(Scotland) St Johnstone	End of Season	
4 August 2022	GK	(England) Ryan Sandford	(England) Dover Athletic	4 September 2022	
13 September 2022	CM	(England) Kamarl Grant	(England) Dagenham & Redbridge	13 October 2022	
13 September 2022	GK	(England) Ryan Sandford	(England) Weymouth	13 October 2022	
24 September 2022	LB	(Kosovo) Besart Topalloj	(England) Dagenham & Redbridge	22 October 2022	
8 October 2022	CB	(England) Chin Okoli	(England) Torquay United	5 November 2022	
1 November 2022	GK	(England) Ryan Sandford	(England) Maidstone United	16 December 2022 (Note: On 16 December, Sandford returned after suffering a shoulder injury.)	
16 December 2022	CM	(England) Sha'mar Lawson	(England) Maidstone United	End of Season (Note: On 6 January, Lawson's loan at Maidstone was extended for a further 28-days, On 3 February, the loan was extended by a further month, until 3 March, and On March 3, it was extended again until the end of the season)	
23 December 2022	LB	(Kosovo) Besart Topalloj	(England) Bromley	20 January 2023	
3 February 2023	GK	(England) Jordan Gillmore	(England) VCD Athletic	End of Season (Note: On 2 March, Gillmore's loan at VCD was extended until the season ends)	

== Pre-season and friendlies ==
On June 8, Millwall announced their first two pre-season friendlies, against Dartford and Ipswich Town along with a training camp in Republic of Ireland. Two days later, a trip to Colchester United was confirmed. A behind-closed-doors meeting with Crystal Palace was also planned. A fifth friendly match was confirmed in July, against Watford. On 13 July, the club announced they would host Hammarby at The Den in a pre-season meeting.

A mid-season friendly during the 2022 FIFA World Cup winter break against Brøndby was announced.

Win Draw Loss Fixtures

9 July 2022 Friendly	Crystal Palace	5–4	Millwall	Beckenham
13:00 BST	Eze 3'; Ayew 18'; O'Brien 64'; Benteke 67'; Rak-Sakyi 82'	Report	Afobe 6', 35'; Cresswell 76'; Flemming 81'	Stadium: Crystal Palace FC Training Ground; Attendance: 0 (behind-closed-doors)

12 July 2022 Friendly	Millwall	5–0	Bromley	Bromley
14:00 BST	Evans (?); Bennett (?) (o.g.) (?); Malone (?)	Report		Stadium: Millwall FC Training Ground; Attendance: 0 (behind-closed-doors)

12 July 2022 Friendly	Dartford	0–2	Millwall	Dartford
19:45 BST		Report	Afobe 11'; Burey 69'	Stadium: Princes Park; Attendance: 3,952

15 July 2022 Friendly	Colchester United	0–1	Millwall	Colchester
19:30 BST		Report	Cooper 45+1'	Stadium: JobServe Community Stadium

19 July 2022 Friendly	Millwall	Cancelled	Watford	Bermondsey
19:00 BST				Stadium: The Den
Note: Match was cancelled due to Watford no longer able to participate.

20 July 2022 Friendly	Millwall	0–0 (3–5 p)	Hammarby	Bermondsey
19:00 BST		Report		Stadium: The Den; Attendance: 1,992; Referee: Tim Robinson
	Penalties
	Cresswell (penalty scored); Olaofe (penalty missed); Leonard (penalty scored); Saville (penalty scored)		Fenger (penalty scored); Jeahze (penalty scored); Andersen (penalty scored); Nilsson (penalty scored); Besara (penalty scored)

23 July 2022 Friendly	Millwall	1–1	Ipswich Town	Bermondsey
15:00 BST	Afobe 16'	Report	Ladapo 54'	Stadium: The Den; Attendance: 2,430; Referee: Gavin Ward

26 November 2022 Friendly	Millwall	1–1	Brøndby	Bermondsey
13:00 GMT	Wallace 50'	Report	Kvistgaarden 86'	Stadium: The Den

== Competitions ==
=== Overall record ===
Competition	First match	Last match	Starting round	Record							
Competition	First match	Last match	Starting round	Pld	W	D	L	GF	GA	GD	Win %
Championship	30 July 2022	8 May 2023	Matchday 1	46	19	11	16	57	50	+7	41.30
FA Cup	7 January 2023	7 January 2023	Third round	1	0	0	1	0	2	−2	0.00
EFL Cup	2 August 2022	2 August 2022	First round	1	0	0	1	0	1	−1	0.00
Total				48	19	11	18	57	53	+4	39.58

Last updated: 19 February 2024
Source: [ Soccerway]

=== Championship ===
==== League table ====
Pos	Team	Pld	W	D	L	GF	GA	GD	Pts	Promotion, qualification or relegation
5	Coventry City	46	18	16	12	58	46	+12	70	Qualification for Championship play-offs
6	Sunderland	46	18	15	13	68	55	+13	69	Qualification for Championship play-offs
7	Blackburn Rovers	46	20	9	17	52	54	−2	69	
8	Millwall	46	19	11	16	57	50	+7	68	
9	West Bromwich Albion	46	18	12	16	59	53	+6	66	
10	Swansea City	46	18	12	16	68	64	+4	66	
11	Watford	46	16	15	15	56	53	+3	63	

Source: EFL Official Website
Rules for classification: 1) Points; 2) Goal difference; 3) Number of goals scored; 4) Head-to-head results; 5) Wins; 6) Away goals; 7) Penalty points (sec 9.5); 8) 12-point sending off offences

==== Results summary ====
Overall								Home						Away					
Pld	W	D	L	GF	GA	GD	Pts	W	D	L	GF	GA	GD	W	D	L	GF	GA	GD
45	19	11	15	54	46	+8	68	11	6	5	31	18	+13	8	5	10	23	28	−5

Last updated: 28 April 2023.
Source: [ Soccerway]

==== Results by round ====
Round	1	2	3	4	5	6	7	8	9	10	11	12	13	14	15	16	17	18	19	20	21	22	23	24	25	26	27	28	29	30	31	32	33	34	35	36	37	38	39	40	41	42	43	44	45	46
Ground	H	A	H	A	A	H	A	H	A	H	A	A	H	A	H	H	A	A	H	A	A	H	A	H	H	A	A	H	A	A	H	H	A	A	H	A	H	A	A	H	A	H	H	A	A	H
Result	W	L	W	D	L	L	L	W	L	W	L	D	W	W	W	W	L	D	D	W	L	D	W	D	W	L	W	D	W	L	W	D	W	D	L	W	W	L	D	D	L	W	L	L	W	L
Position	1	10	4	5	10	16	19	14	19	13	16	15	13	11	8	6	8	9	10	6	7	10	6	9	6	8	8	8	5	7	6	5	5	5	7	6	6	6	5	5	5	5	5	7	6	8

Updated to match(es) played on 28 April 2023. Source: [ Soccerway]
A = Away; H = Home; W = Win; D = Draw; L = Loss; P = Postponed

==== Matches ====
Win Draw Loss Fixtures

On 23 June, the league fixtures were announced.

30 July 2022 1	Millwall	2–0	Stoke City	Bermondsey
15:00 BST	Cresswell 12', (yellow card) 39', (goal) 65'	Report	Flint (yellow card) 43'; Kilkenny (yellow card) 83'	Stadium: The Den; Attendance: 15,341; Referee: Keith Stroud

6 August 2022 2	Sheffield United	2–0	Millwall	Sheffield
15:00 BST	Ndiaye 7'; Berge 22'; Norwood (penalty missed) 44'; Clark (yellow card) 82'; Norrington-Davies (yellow card) 90+3'; Foderingham (yellow card) 90+4'	Report	Bennett (yellow card) 45'; McNamara (yellow card) 90+3'	Stadium: Bramall Lane; Attendance: 27,738; Referee: David Coote

13 August 2022 3	Millwall	3–2	Coventry City	Bermondsey
15:00 BST	Shackleton (yellow card) 18'; Burey (yellow card) 30'; Cooper 36'; Honeyman 53'; Afobe (yellow card) 62'; McNamara (yellow card) 68'; Saville 85'	Report	McFadzean 2', (yellow card) 82'; Godden 28'; Hamer (yellow card) 37' (yellow-red card) 67'; Bidwell (yellow card) 64'	Stadium: The Den; Attendance: 13,880; Referee: Bobby Madley

16 August 2022 4	Swansea City	2–2	Millwall	Landore
19:45 BST	Manning 1', (yellow card) 73'; Obafemi 12', (yellow card) 90+1'	Report	Burey (yellow card) 39'; Mitchell (yellow card) 42'; Malone (yellow card) 65'; Cabango 90+3' (o.g.); Wood 90+5' (o.g.)	Stadium: Swansea.com Stadium; Attendance: 16,068; Referee: Gavin Ward

19 August 2022 5	Norwich City	2–0	Millwall	Norwich
20:00 BST	Sargent 50', 75'; Gibbs (yellow card) 84'; Krul (yellow card) 90+2'	Report	Saville (yellow card) 19'; Honeyman (yellow card) 66'	Stadium: Carrow Road; Attendance: 26,214; Referee: Robert Jones

27 August 2022 6	Millwall	0–1	Reading	Bermondsey
15:00 BST		Report	Sarr 14'; Holmes (yellow card) 82'	Stadium: The Den; Attendance: 14,352; Referee: Chris Kavanagh

30 August 2022 7	Burnley	2–0	Millwall	Burnley
19:45 BST	Vitinho 62'; Rodriguez 72'	Report	Cresswell (yellow card) 18'; Hutchinson (yellow card) 35'; Voglsammer (yellow card) 45+1'	Stadium: Turf Moor; Attendance: 17,689; Referee: Leigh Doughty

3 September 2022 8	Millwall	2–0	Cardiff City	Bermondsey
15:00 BST	Cresswell 63'; Styles (yellow card) 76'; Wallace (yellow card) 88'; Afobe 90'	Report	Kipré (yellow card) 46'; Romeo (yellow card) 53'	Stadium: The Den; Attendance: 13,010; Referee: Jeremy Simpson

10 September 2022	Sunderland	Postponed	Millwall	Sunderland
15:00 BST				Stadium: Stadium of Light
Note: Fixture was postponed as a mark of respect following the passing of Queen Elizabeth II.

14 September 2022 9	Millwall	0–2	Queens Park Rangers	Bermondsey
19:45 BST		Report	Willock 54'; Johansen 71'	Stadium: The Den; Attendance: 13,384; Referee: Tim Robinson

17 September 2022 10	Millwall	2–1	Blackpool	Bermondsey
15:00 BST	Cooper (yellow card) 7'; Grimshaw 14' (o.g.); Afobe 63'; Wallace (yellow card) 68'	Report	Patino 33', (yellow card) 60'; Corbeanu (yellow card) 90+1'	Stadium: The Den; Attendance: 11,463; Referee: Darren Bond

1 October 2022 11	Blackburn Rovers	2–1	Millwall	Blackburn
15:00 BST	Dolan 57'; Brereton Díaz 63'; Morton (yellow card) 75'	Report	Cooper 75'	Stadium: Ewood Park; Attendance: 12,164; Referee: David Webb

5 October 2022 12	Rotherham United	1–1	Millwall	Rotherham
19:45 BST	Barlaser 9' (pen.); Hall (yellow card) 55'; Eaves (yellow card) 79'	Report	Flemming 42'; Saville (yellow card) 52'; Cooper (yellow card) 60'	Stadium: New York Stadium; Attendance: 8,618; Referee: Dean Whitestone

8 October 2022 13	Millwall	2–0	Middlesbrough	Bermondsey
15:00 BST	Flemming 5' 49'; Wallace (yellow card) 29'; Burey (yellow card) 42'	Report	McNair (yellow card) 42'; Jones (yellow card) 57'	Stadium: The Den; Attendance: 15,638; Referee: Matt Donohue

15 October 2022 14	Bristol City	1–2	Millwall	Ashton Gate
15:00 BST	Klose (yellow card) 43'; Semenyo (yellow card) 53'; Hutchinson 71' (o.g.)	Report	Bradshaw 44'; Cooper (yellow card) 53'; Wallace (yellow card) 57'; Flemming 76'; McNamara (yellow card) 90+2'; Afobe (penalty missed) 90+7'	Stadium: Ashton Gate; Attendance: 19,122; Referee: Gavin Ward

19 October 2022 15	Millwall	3–0	Watford	Bermondsey
19:45 BST	Bradshaw 8' 26' 33'	Report	Davis (yellow card) 22'; Kamara (yellow card) 56'	Stadium: The Den; Attendance: 12,787; Referee: David Webb

22 October 2022 16	Millwall	2–1	West Bromwich Albion	Bermondsey
15:00 BST	Mitchell (yellow card) 31'; Styles 38'; Burey 90'	Report	Swift 20'; Bartley (yellow card) 68' (yellow-red card) 85'	Stadium: The Den; Attendance: 15,212; Referee: Andrew Madley

29 October 2022 17	Huddersfield Town	1–0	Millwall	Huddersfield
15:00 BST	Nakayama 9'; Helik (yellow card) 78'; Thomas (yellow card) 84'	Report	Bradshaw (yellow card) 50'; Cresswell (yellow card) 54'; Burey (yellow card) 82'	Stadium: John Smith's Stadium; Attendance: 17,717; Referee: Stephen Martin

2 November 2022 18	Birmingham City	0–0	Millwall	Bordesley
19:45 GMT		Report	Wallace (yellow card) 51'	Stadium: St. Andrew's Stadium; Attendance: 15,030; Referee: Graham Scott

5 November 2022 19	Millwall	0–0	Hull City	Bermondsey
15:00 GMT		Report	Pelkas (yellow card) 27'; Estupiñán (red card) 37'; Smith (yellow card) 90'; Coyle (yellow card) 90+5'	Stadium: The Den; Attendance: 14,488; Referee: John Busby

12 November 2022 20	Preston North End	2–4	Millwall	Preston
15:00 GMT	Lindsay (yellow card) 14'; Hughes 20'; Evans 28'	Report	Flemming 4', 16', 64'; Saville (yellow card) 19'; Long (yellow card) 20'; McNamara (yellow card) 31'; Cresswell 72'	Stadium: Deepdale; Attendance: 15,184; Referee: Oliver Langford

3 December 2022 21	Sunderland	3–0	Millwall	Sunderland
12:30 GMT	Diallo 53'; Pritchard 58'; Gooch (yellow card) 73'; Simms 90+3'	Report	Saville (yellow card) 22'; Honeyman (yellow card) 34'; Mitchell (yellow card) 41'	Stadium: Stadium of Light; Attendance: 37,012; Referee: Tim Robinson

10 December 2022 22	Millwall	1–1	Wigan Athletic	Bermondsey
15:00 GMT	Wallace (yellow card) 14'; Flemming 40'	Report	Keane 33'; Darikwa (yellow card) 52'; Tilt (yellow card) 62'	Stadium: The Den; Attendance: 12,698; Referee: Keith Stroud

26 December 2022 23	Watford	0–2	Millwall	Watford
12:00 GMT	Bacuna (yellow card) 10'; Kamara (red card) 38'; Bachmann (yellow card) 90+4'	Report	Voglsammer 22'; Saville (yellow card) 28'; McNamara (yellow card) 39'; Long (yellow card) 63'; Flemming 83'	Stadium: Vicarage Road; Attendance: 20,204; Referee: Josh Smith

29 December 2022 24	Millwall	0–0	Bristol City	Bermondsey
19:45 GMT		Report		Stadium: The Den; Attendance: 14,814; Referee: Dean Whitestone

1 January 2023 25	Millwall	3–0	Rotherham United	Bermondsey
15:00 GMT	Bradshaw 4', 81'; Cooper (yellow card) 51'; Humphreys 66' (o.g.)	Report	Lindsay (yellow card) 76'	Stadium: The Den; Attendance: 12,899; Referee: Gavin Ward

14 January 2023 26	Middlesbrough	1–0	Millwall	Middlesbrough
15:00 GMT	Crooks (yellow card) 45+2'; Forss 54'; Howson (yellow card) 87'	Report	Long (yellow card) 39'; Wallace (yellow card) 47'; Saville (yellow card) 78'; Hutchinson (yellow card) 90'	Stadium: Riverside Stadium; Attendance: 24,614; Referee: Matt Donohue

21 January 2023 27	Cardiff City	0–1	Millwall	Leckwith
15:00 GMT	Rinomhota (yellow card) 38'; Allsop (yellow card) 62'; Kipré (yellow card) 72'	Report	Bradshaw (yellow card) 20', (goal) 26'; Cooper (yellow card) 28'; Styles (yellow card) 74'	Stadium: Cardiff City Stadium; Attendance: 18,838; Referee: Leigh Doughty

4 February 2023 28	Millwall	1–1	Sunderland	Bermondsey
15:00 GMT	Cooper (yellow card) 32', (goal) 59'; Bennett (yellow card) 37'; Saville (yellow card) 81'	Report	Hume (yellow card) 52'; Cirkin 81'	Stadium: The Den; Attendance: 18,524; Referee: Thomas Bramall

11 February 2023 29	Queens Park Rangers	1–2	Millwall	Shepherd's Bush
15:00 GMT	Armstrong (yellow card) 68'; Martin 82'	Report	Watmore 31'; Burke 78'; Honeyman (yellow card) 80'	Stadium: Loftus Road Stadium; Attendance: 15,335; Referee: Dean Whitestone

14 February 2023 30	Coventry City	1–0	Millwall	Coventry
19:45 GMT	Norton-Cuffy (yellow card) 47'; Gyökeres 67'	Report	Mitchell (yellow card) 27'; Cooper (yellow card) 41'; Saville (yellow card) 55'	Stadium: CBS Arena; Attendance: 16,446; Referee: Matt Donohue

18 February 2023 31	Millwall	3–2	Sheffield United	Bermondsey
12:30 GMT	Bradshaw 6', 63', 88'; Flemming (yellow card) 45+1'; Cooper (yellow card) 59'; Honeyman (yellow card) 90+5'	Report	Doyle 39'; Berge (yellow card) 45+2'; McBurnie (yellow card) 76'; Bogle (yellow card) 78'; McAtee 82'; Robinson (yellow card) 90+2'	Stadium: The Den; Attendance: 15,571 (1,940 away); Referee: Stephen Martin

21 February 2023 32	Millwall	1–1	Burnley	Bermondsey
19:45 GMT	Bradshaw (yellow card) 77', (goal) 85'	Report	Al-Dakhil (yellow card) 26'; Barnes 51'	Stadium: The Den; Attendance: 13,542 (1,370 away); Referee: James Linington

25 February 2023 33	Stoke City	0–1	Millwall	Stoke-on-Trent
15:00 GMT		Report	Flemming 9'; McNamara (yellow card) 83'	Stadium: bet365 Stadium; Attendance: 19,773 (966 away); Referee: Tim Robinson

28 February 2023 34	Luton Town	2–2	Millwall	Luton
19:45 GMT	Adebayo 58'; Berry 87'	Report	Flemming 4'; Cresswell (yellow card) 45+1'; Bradshaw 52'	Stadium: Kenilworth Stadium; Attendance: 10,060 (1,032 away); Referee: Geoff Eltringham

5 March 2023 35	Millwall	2–3	Norwich City	Bermondsey
15:00 GMT	Leonard (yellow card) 12'; Bradshaw 20'; McNamara (yellow card) 67'; Flemming 83'	Report	Hernández (yellow card) 35'; Sørensen 38'; Bradshaw 55' (o.g.); Sara 65'; Gibson (yellow card) 80'; Aarons (yellow card) 88'	Stadium: The Den; Attendance: 18,785 (2,944 away); Referee: Graham Scott

11 March 2023 36	Reading	0–1	Millwall	Reading, Berkshire
15:00 GMT	Ince (yellow card) 86'	Report	Voglsammer 11' (pen.)	Stadium: Select Car Leasing Stadium; Attendance: 13,265; Referee: Michael Salisbury

14 March 2023 37	Millwall	2–1	Swansea City	Bermondsey
19:45 GMT	Bradshaw 48'; McNamara (yellow card) 50'; Voglsammer 55'	Report	Darling (yellow card) 42'; Manning 58', (yellow card) 90+5'	Stadium: The Den; Attendance: 12,470 (580 away); Referee: David Webb

18 March 2023 38	Millwall	0–1	Huddersfield Town	Bermondsey
15:00 GMT	Voglsammer (yellow card) 57'; Cooper (yellow card) 83'	Report	Pearson (yellow card) 37'; Waghorn (yellow card) 43'; Koroma (yellow card) 62'; Ward 67'	Stadium: The Den; Attendance: 14,968 (556 away); Referee: Andy Davies

1 April 2023 39	West Bromwich Albion	0–0	Millwall	West Bromwich
15:00 BST	Thomas-Asante (yellow card) 57'; Dike (yellow card) 69'	Report	McNamara (yellow card) 54'; Bradshaw (yellow card) 69'; Saville (yellow card) 73'	Stadium: The Hawthorns; Attendance: 24,334; Referee: Jeremy Simpson

7 April 2023 40	Millwall	0–0	Luton Town	Bermondsey
12:30 BST	Saville (yellow card) 40'	Report	Doughty (yellow card) 58'; Campbell (yellow card) 77'	Stadium: The Den; Attendance: 18,422 (2,602 away); Referee: Darren England

10 April 2023 41	Hull City	1–0	Millwall	Kingston upon Hull
15:00 BST	Traoré 70'; Darlow (yellow card) 84'	Report	Hutchinson (yellow card) 65'; Burke (yellow card) 87'	Stadium: MKM Stadium; Attendance: 20,069 (897 away); Referee: Josh Smith

15 April 2023 42	Millwall	2–0	Preston North End	Bermondsey
15:00 BST	Bradshaw 14'; Cooper (yellow card) 65'; Flemming 72'	Report	Whiteman (yellow card) 51'; Onomah (yellow card) 81'	Stadium: The Den; Attendance: 16,488 (1,173 away); Referee: Tim Robinson

18 April 2023 43	Millwall	0–1	Birmingham City	Bermondsey
19:45 BST		Report	Jutkiewicz 28'; Bielik (yellow card) 34'; Long (yellow card) 50'	Stadium: The Den; Attendance: 13,311; Referee: Dean Whitestone

22 April 2023 44	Wigan Athletic	2–1	Millwall	Wigan
15:00 BST	Keane 14'; Aasgaard 84'; McClean (yellow card) 90+6'	Report	Saville 30'; Styles (yellow card) 37'; Cooper (yellow card) 45'	Stadium: DW Stadium; Attendance: 10,858; Referee: Bobby Madley

28 April 2023 45	Blackpool	2–3	Millwall	Blackpool
20:00 BST	Yates 36' (pen.); Fiorini 67'; Rogers (yellow card) 90+7'	Report	Bradshaw 2', 59', (yellow card) 72'; Flemming (yellow card) 24', (goal) 75' (pen.); Cooper (yellow card) 26'; Saville (yellow card) 32'	Stadium: Bloomfield Road; Attendance: 12,191 (1,249 away); Referee: Matthew Donohue

8 May 2023 46	Millwall	3–4	Blackburn Rovers	Bermondsey
15:00 BST	Watmore 8', 37'; Burke 39'; Cooper (yellow card) 64'	Report	Wharton 22'; Rankin-Costello 51'; Brereton Díaz 63', 86'	Stadium: The Den; Attendance: 17,588; Referee: Craig Pawson

=== FA Cup ===
Millwall were drawn at home to Sheffield United in the third round.

Win Draw Loss Fixtures

7 January 2023 Third round	Millwall	0–2	Sheffield United	Bermondsey
15:00 GMT	McNamara (yellow card) 18'	Report	Jebbison 23'; Bogle 36', (yellow card) 72'	Stadium: The Den; Attendance: 7,268; Referee: John Brooks

=== EFL Cup ===
Win Draw Loss Fixtures

Millwall were drawn away to Cambridge United in the first round.

2 August 2022 First round	Cambridge United	1–0	Millwall	Cambridge
19:45 BST	O'Neil 59'; Janneh (yellow card) 77'	Report	Honeyman (yellow card) 31' (yellow-red card) 61'	Stadium: Abbey Stadium; Attendance: 3,368; Referee: Charles Breakspear
