= Danny McNamara (footballer) =

Footballer (born 1998)

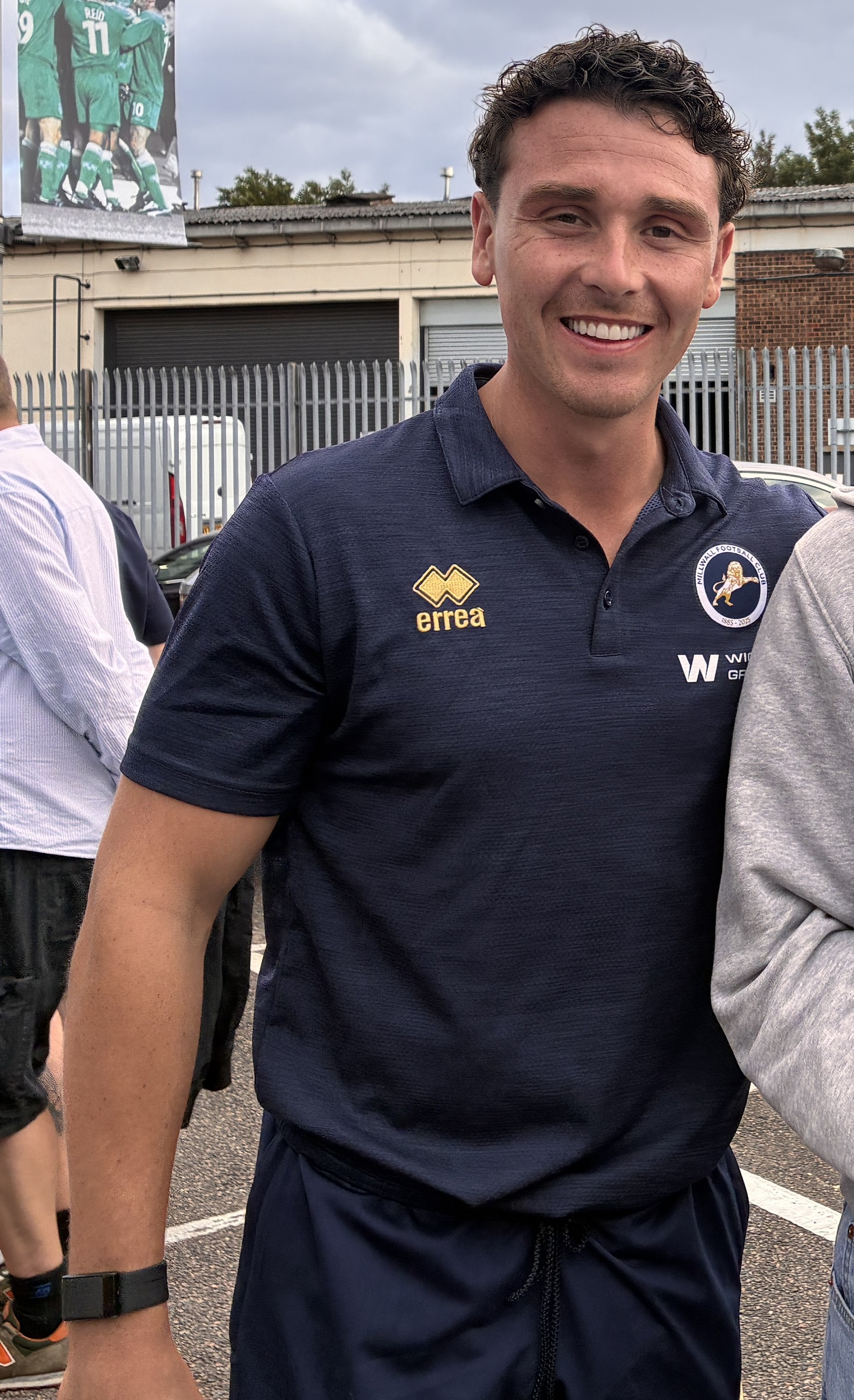
- Danny McNamara in 2025.

Personal information
- Full name: Danny John McNamara
- Date of birth: 27 December 1998 (age 27)
- Place of birth: Sidcup, England
- Height: 1.80 m (5 ft 11 in)
- Positions: Full back; wing-back

Team information
- Current team: Charlton Athletic
- Number: 20

Youth career
- Charlton Athletic
- –2017: Millwall

Senior career*
Years	Team	Apps	(Gls)
2017–2026	Millwall	157	(2)
2018–2019	→ Welling United (loan)	9	(0)
2019	→ Dover Athletic (loan)	8	(1)
2019	→ Havant & Waterlooville (loan)	4	(1)
2019–2020	→ Newport County (loan)	21	(0)
2020–2021	→ St Johnstone (loan)	22	(1)
2026–	Charlton Athletic	14	(0)

International career
2019–2020	Republic of Ireland U21	2	(0)
- * Club domestic league appearances and goals as of 17:10, 21 November 2026 (UTC)

Danny John McNamara (born 27 December 1998) is a professional footballer who plays as a full back for EFL Championship club Charlton Athletic. He is a former Republic of Ireland under-21 international.

== Playing career ==
=== Early career ===
Born in nearby Sidcup, McNamara began his development at the Charlton Athletic Community Trust Advanced Centre at the age of seven. He then joined the Charlton Athletic Academy where he played until the age of 14. After leaving Charlton, he had a brief spell playing for non-League side Corinthian F.C..

=== Millwall ===
Millwall scouted McNamara in 2015, and signed him up on a two-year scholarship. He signed his first professional contract with the club in July 2017.

==== Loan spells ====
McNamara spent time on loan during the 2018–19 season at Welling United, Dover Athletic and Havant & Waterlooville. Upon his return in May 2019, McNamara signed a new one-year contract with Millwall with an option for a further year.

On 31 July 2019, McNamara joined League Two side Newport County on a season long loan. On 3 August 2019, he made his Football League debut for Newport, being named in the starting line-up for a 2–2 draw against Mansfield Town on the opening day of the 2019–20 season. On 6 January 2020, Millwall recalled McNamara from his loan spell at Newport.

On 14 July 2020, McNamara and fellow Lion Isaac Olaofe joined Scottish Premiership side St Johnstone on season-long loans. On 4 January 2021, McNamara was recalled by Millwall, with teammate James Brown being sent on loan to St Johnstone.

==== Return to Millwall and breakthrough ====
Following his return to Millwall in early January 2021, McNamara made his debut for the club on 9 January 2021 in an FA Cup victory over Boreham Wood and made his league debut three days later in a 1–1 away draw with AFC Bournemouth.

On 9 April 2022, McNamara opened his account for the club with the first two goals in a 4–1 thrashing of Barnsley.

On 6 November 2024, during a 1–0 home win against Leeds, McNamara was headbutted in stoppage time by opposing player, Junior Firpo. Referee Leigh Doughty referred the incident to the Football League and Firpo received a three-game suspension. The incident, and subsequent aftermath led to Leeds manager, Daniel Farke questioning McNamara's conduct, along with the methods and consistency as to how the Football League imposes retrospective sanctions.

McNamara was involved in an altercation with a Charlton Athletic fan in the stands during a 1–1 draw at The Valley on 13 September 2025.

On 15 May 2026, it was announced that McNamara would depart the club upon the expiry of his contract.

=== Charlton Athletic ===
On 23 July 2026, McNamara joined Charlton Athletic on a two-year deal.

== International Career ==
On 28 August 2019, McNamara was named in the Republic of Ireland Under-21 squad. He qualifies through his grandparents from Leitrim.

== Personal life ==
McNamara was a season ticker holder at Millwall before signing for them, and said playing for them was his "boyhood dream".

== Career statistics ==
As of 21 November 2026

Appearances and goals by club, season and competition
Club	Season	League			National cup (Note: Includes FA Cup, Scottish Cup)		League cup (Note: Includes EFL Cup, Scottish League Cup)		Other		Total	
Club	Season	Division	Apps	Goals	Apps	Goals	Apps	Goals	Apps	Goals	Apps	Goals
Millwall	2018–19	Championship	0	0	0	0	0	0	0	0	0	0
Millwall	2019–20	Championship	0	0	0	0	0	0	0	0	0	0
Millwall	2020–21	Championship	16	0	1	0	0	0	0	0	17	0
Millwall	2021–22	Championship	37	2	1	0	0	0	0	0	38	2
Millwall	2022–23	Championship	42	0	1	0	1	0	0	0	44	0
Millwall	2023–24	Championship	33	0	1	0	1	0	0	0	35	0
Millwall	2024–25	Championship	13	0	0	0	2	0	0	0	15	0
Millwall	2025–26	Championship	16	0	1	0	0	0	0	0	17	0
Millwall	Total		157	2	5	0	4	0	0	0	166	2
Welling United (loan)	2018–19	National League South	9	0	0	0	0	0	0	0	9	0
Dover Athletic (loan)	2018–19	National League	8	1	0	0	0	0	0	0	8	1
Havant & Waterlooville (loan)	2018–19	National League	4	1	0	0	0	0	0	0	4	1
Newport County (loan)	2019–20	League Two	21	0	0	0	1	0	1 (Note: Appearance in the EFL Trophy)	0	23	0
St Johnstone (loan)	2020–21	Scottish Premiership	22	1	0	0	0	0	0	0	22	1
Charlton Athletic	2026–27	Championship	14	0	0	0	2	0	0	0	16	0
Career total			235	5	5	0	7	0	1	0	248	5
