= 2023–24 Millwall F.C. season =

139th season in existence of Millwall FC

Millwall
2023–24 season
- Owner: Millwall Holdings
- Chairman: John Berylson (until his death on 4th July); James Berlyson (from 14th July)
- Manager: Gary Rowett (until 18 October); Adam Barrett (caretaker - from 18 October); Joe Edwards (between 6 November–21 February); Neil Harris (from 21 February)
- Stadium: The Den
- Championship: 13th
- FA Cup: Third round
- EFL Cup: First round
- Top goalscorer: League: Zian Flemming (8); All: Zian Flemming (8)
- Highest home attendance: 18,905 vs. Bristol City & Southampton
- Lowest home attendance: 4,738 vs. Reading
- Average home league attendance: 16,544
- Biggest win: Sheffield Wednesday 0–4 Millwall (11 November 2023)
- Biggest defeat: Millwall 0–4 Ipswich Town (14 February 2024)
Home colours	Away colours	Third colours

The 2023–24 season was the 139th season in the history of Millwall Football Club, their seventh consecutive season in the Championship, 97th consecutive season in the Football League, and 47th in the second tier. The club played in the FA Cup, and the EFL Cup. In preseason, Millwall announced the death of owner and chairman John Berylson, who died in an accident on 4 July. He was succeeded as chairman by his son; James Berylson.

On 18th October 2023, the club announced it had mutually agreed to part company with first team manager Gary Rowett. Assistant manager Adam Barrett took over as interim manager for four games, before England under-20s manager Joe Edwards was installed as their new head coach on 6 November 2023. In his debut game, Edwards led Millwall to a 4–0 win at Sheffield Wednesday, the Lions largest away win in the second tier since 2001 and the biggest win in a first game for a Millwall manager since Ron Gray in 1956. Edwards was sacked after winning only four of his 19 games in charge, leaving Millwall in relegation trouble. Neil Harris returned to manage the club, winning eight of their final 13 games, including five in a row to finish the season strongly in 13th place.

Millwall's average home attendance of 16,540 was their highest since the 1952–53 season. Zian Flemming finished top scorer this season with eight goals, the lowest since the 2007–08 season.

== First-team squad ==
As of 11 February 2024

Note: Flags indicate national team as has been defined under FIFA eligibility rules. Players may hold more than one non-FIFA nationality.

No.	Nationality	Name	Position	Place of Birth	Date of birth (age)	Apps.	Goals	Assists	Signed from	Date Signed	Transfer Fee	Contract end
Goalkeepers
20	(Montenegro) (England)	Matija Sarkic	GK	Grimsby	23 July 1997 (age 29)	1	0	0	(England) Wolverhampton Wanderers	3 August 2023	£1,200,000	30 June 2026
27	(England)	Connal Trueman	GK	Birmingham	26 March 1996 (age 30)	0	0	0	(England) Birmingham City	4 August 2022	Free Transfer	30 June 2025
33	(Poland)	Bartosz Białkowski	GK	Braniewo	6 July 1987 (age 39)	155	0	0	(England) Ipswich Town	2020	£350,000	30 June 2024
Defenders
2	(Republic of Ireland) (England)	Danny McNamara	RB/RM	Sidcup	27 December 1998 (age 27)	101	2	4	Academy	2018	Trainee	30 June 2025
3	(Scotland)	Murray Wallace	LB/CB	Glasgow	10 January 1993 (age 33)	185	11	5	(England) Scunthorpe United	2018	£500,000	30 June 2025
4	(England)	Shaun Hutchinson	CB	Newcastle upon Tyne	23 November 1990 (age 35)	244	13	7	(England) Fulham	2016	Free Transfer	30 June 2024
5	(England)	Jake Cooper	CB	Bracknell	3 February 1995 (age 31)	302	22	17	(England) Reading	2017	Undisclosed	30 June 2025
6	(England)	Japhet Tanganga	CB	Hackney	31 March 1999 (age 27)	0	0	0	(England) Tottenham Hotspur	18 January 2024	Loan	31 May 2024
15	(England)	Joe Bryan	LB/LM	Bristol	17 September 1993 (age 33)	2	0	0	(England) Fulham	1 July 2023	Free Transfer	30 June 2027
17	(England)	Brooke Norton-Cuffy	RB	Pimlico	12 January 2004 (age 22)	0	0	0	(England) Arsenal	24 August 2023	Loan	31 May 2024
45	(Jamaica) (England)	Wes Harding	RB/CB/LB	Leicester	20 October 1996 (age 30)	1	0	0	(England) Rotherham United	21 July 2023	Free Transfer	30 June 2024
Midfielders
8	(England)	Billy Mitchell	CM/CDM/RB	Orpington	7 April 2001 (age 25)	110	1	1	Academy	2019	Trainee	30 June 2025
10	(Netherlands)	Zian Flemming	CAM/ST/RW/LW	Amsterdam	1 August 1998 (age 28)	46	15	3	(Netherlands) Fortuna Sittard	2022	£1,700,000	30 June 2025
14	(Scotland)	Allan Campbell	CM	Glasgow	4 July 1998 (age 28)	0	0	0	(England) Luton Town	1 September 2023	Loan	31 May 2024
18	(England)	Ryan Leonard	CM/CDM/CB/RB	Plympton	24 May 1992 (age 34)	130	5	11	(England) Sheffield United	2 January 2019	£1,250,000	30 June 2024
23	(Northern Ireland)	George Saville	CM/CDM	Camberley	1 June 1993 (age 33)	153	15	5	(England) Middlesbrough	2 July 2021	£600,000	30 June 2024
24	(Belgium)	Casper de Norre	CM	Hasselt	7 February 1997 (age 29)	1	0	0	(Belgium) Oud-Heverlee Leuven	21 July 2023	Undisclosed	30 June 2027
25	(England) (Ivory Coast)	Romain Esse	CAM/RW/CM	England	13 May 2005 (age 21)	15	1	0	Academy	2023	Trainee	30 June 2026
39	(England)	George Honeyman	CM/CAM/RW	Prudhoe	8 September 1994 (age 32)	40	1	3	(England) Hull City	2022	Undisclosed	30 June 2025
44	(England)	George Walker	CM		24 September 2003 (age 23)	0	0	0	Academy	1 July 2023	Trainee	30 June 2024
48	(England)	Sha'mar Lawson	CM		14 June 2003 (age 23)	0	0	0	Mansfield Town	1 July 2022	Trainee	30 June 2024
Forwards
7	(Scotland)	Kevin Nisbet	ST	Glasgow	8 March 1997 (age 29)	2	0	0	(Scotland) Hibernian	14 June 2023	Undisclosed	30 June 2027
9	(Wales)	Tom Bradshaw	ST/CAM/RW	Shrewsbury	27 July 1992 (age 34)	164	40	9	(England) Barnsley	2019	£1,000,000	30 June 2024
11	(England)	Ryan Longman	LW	Redhill	6 November 2000 (age 26)	0	0	0	(England) Hull City	1 September 2023	Loan	31 May 2024
12	(England)	Adam Mayor	LW	Liverpool	10 April 2005 (age 21)	0	0	0	(England) Morecambe	31 January 2024	Undisclosed	30 June 2027
19	(England)	Duncan Watmore	RW/ST/CAM	Manchester	8 March 1994 (aged 29)	17	3	2	(England) Middlesbrough	2023	Undisclosed	30 June 2025
21	(Republic of Ireland)	Michael Obafemi	ST/RW	Dublin	6 July 2000 (age 26)	0	0	0	(England) Burnley	23 January 2024	Loan	31 May 2024
22	(Republic of Ireland)	Aidomo Emakhu	LW/ST/RW	Bawnogue	26 October 2003 (age 23)	3	0	1	(Republic of Ireland) Shamrock Rovers	2022	Undisclosed	30 June 2026
29	(England)	Tom Leahy	ST		31 March 2004 (age 22)	0	0	0	Academy	2023	Trainee	30 June 2024
Out on Loan
26	(England)	Alex Mitchell	CB		7 October 2001 (age 25)	0	0	0	Academy	1 July 2020	Trainee	30 June 2025
43	(England)	Kamarl Grant	CB		26 January 2003 (age 23)	0	0	0	(England) Sheffield United	1 July 2022	Free Transfer	30 June 2024
46	(England)	Nino Adom-Malaki	LB/LM			0	0	0	(England) Kinetic Foundation	21 January 2021	Free Transfer	30 June 2024

== Transfers ==
=== In ===
Date	Pos	Player	Transferred from	Fee	Ref
14 June 2023	CF	(Scotland) Kevin Nisbet	(Scotland) Hibernian	Undisclosed	
1 July 2023	LB	(England) Joe Bryan	(England) Fulham	Free Transfer	
1 July 2023	GK	(United States) Ethan Wady †	(England) Chelsea	Free Transfer	
21 July 2023	CM	(Belgium) Casper de Norre	(Belgium) Oud-Heverlee Leuven	Undisclosed	
21 July 2023	RB	(Jamaica) Wes Harding	(England) Rotherham United	Free Transfer	
3 August 2023	GK	(Montenegro) Matija Sarkic	(England) Wolverhampton Wanderers	£1.2 million	
31 January 2024	LW	(England) Adam Mayor	(England) Morecambe	Undisclosed	

† Signed for the Under-21s

=== Out ===
Date	Pos	Player	Transferred to	Fee	Ref
30 June 2023	CM	(England) Alfie Allen	(England) Dulwich Hamlet	Released	
30 June 2023	CF	(England) Tyrese Briscoe	Free agent	Released	
30 June 2023	LW	(England) Mason Bennett	(England) Burton Albion	Released	
30 June 2023	CB	(England) Ernie Cheeseman	Free agent	Released	
30 June 2023	CM	(England) Laquay Coleman	Free agent	Released	
30 June 2023	CM	(England) Kallen Donaldson	Free agent	Released	
30 June 2023	DM	(England) George Evans	(Wales) Wrexham	End of Contract	
30 June 2023	GK	(England) Jordan Gillmore	Free agent	Released	
30 June 2023	LB	(England) Scott Malone	(England) Gillingham	Released	
30 June 2023	CB	(England) Arthur Penney	(England) Lewes	Released	
30 June 2023	GK	(England) Ryan Sandford	Free agent	Released	
16 August 2023	CF	(England) Tyler Burey	(Denmark) Odense	Undisclosed	
17 August 2023	GK	(England) George Long	(England) Norwich City	Free Transfer	
1 September 2023	CF	(Germany) Andreas Voglsammer	(Germany) Hannover 96	Mutual Consent	
23 February 2024	GK	(England) Joe Wright	(Republic of Ireland) Galway United	Free Transfer	

=== Loaned in ===
Date	Pos	Player	Loaned from	Until	Ref
24 August 2023	RB	(England) Brooke Norton-Cuffy	(England) Arsenal	End of Season	
1 September 2023	CM	(Scotland) Allan Campbell	(England) Luton Town	End of Season	
1 September 2023	LW	(England) Ryan Longman	(England) Hull City	End of Season	
18 January 2024	CB	(England) Japhet Tanganga	(England) Tottenham Hotspur	End of Season	
23 January 2024	CF	(Republic of Ireland) Michael Obafemi	(England) Burnley	End of Season	

=== Loaned out ===
Date	Pos	Player	Loaned to	Until	Ref
24 July 2023	CF	(England) Nana Boateng	(England) Woking	31 January 2024	
25 July 2023	GK	(England) Joe Wright	(England) Salford City	8 January 2024	
27 July 2023	CB	(England) Chinwike Okoli	(England) Bromley	8 January 2024	
17 August 2023	CB	(England) Alex Mitchell	(England) Lincoln City	End of Season	
8 September 2023	CF	(England) Abdul Abdulmalik	(England) Wealdstone	1 January 2024	
15 September 2023	RB	(England) Kyle Smith	(England) Wealdstone	1 January 2024 (Note: On 11 October, Smith's loan at Wealdstone was extended until January.)	
15 January 2024	LB	(England) Nino Adom-Malaki	(England) Sutton United	End of Season	
1 February 2024	CB	(England) Kamarl Grant	(England) Bromley	End of Season	
12 March 2024	RB	(England) Kyle Smith	(England) Wealdstone	End of Season	

== Pre-season and friendlies ==
On 19 June, Millwall announced their pre-season schedule, with matches against Gillingham, Sutton United, Charlton Athletic and Fortuna Sittard.

Win Draw Loss Fixtures

15 July 2023 Friendly	Gillingham	0–2	Millwall	Gillingham
13:00 BST		Report	Nisbet 26' (pen.); Emakhu 87'	Stadium: Priestfield Stadium; Referee: John Busby

18 July 2023 Friendly	Sutton United	0–3	Millwall	Sutton
19:45 BST		Report	Nisbet 23', 61' (pen.), 75'	Stadium: VBS Community Stadium; Referee: Carl Brook

25 July 2023 Friendly	Millwall	2–2	Charlton Athletic	Bermondsey
19:45 BST	Nisbet 69'; Emakhu 82'	Report	Anderson 6'; Kirk 25'	Stadium: The Den; Attendance: 7,143 (1,510 away); Referee: Keith Stroud

29 July 2023 Friendly	Millwall	1–2	Fortuna Sittard	Bermondsey
13:00 BST	Bradshaw 23'	Report	Halilović 45+2'; Noslin 73'	Stadium: The Den; Attendance: 3,011 (300 away); Referee: James Bell

== Competitions ==
=== Overall record ===
Competition	Starting round	Final position	Record							
Competition	Starting round	Final position	Pld	W	D	L	GF	GA	GD	Win %
Championship	Matchday 1	13th	46	16	11	19	45	55	−10	34.78
FA Cup	Third round	Third round	1	0	0	1	2	3	−1	0.00
EFL Cup	First round	First round	1	0	0	1	0	4	−4	0.00
Total			48	16	11	21	47	62	−15	33.33

Last updated: 4 May 2024
Source: Soccerway

=== Championship ===
==== League table ====
Pos	Team	Pld	W	D	L	GF	GA	GD	Pts
10	Preston North End	46	18	9	19	56	67	−11	63
11	Bristol City	46	17	11	18	53	51	+2	62
12	Cardiff City	46	19	5	22	53	70	−17	62
13	Millwall	46	16	11	19	45	55	−10	59
14	Swansea City	46	15	12	19	59	65	−6	57
15	Watford	46	13	17	16	61	61	0	56
16	Sunderland	46	16	8	22	52	54	−2	56

Source: EFL official website
Rules for classification: 1) Points; 2) Goal difference; 3) Number of goals scored; 4) Head-to-head results; 5) Wins; 6) Away goals; 7) Penalty points (sec 9.5); 8) Number of 12-point sending off offences; 9) Play-off (only if needed to determine promotion/relegation)

==== Results summary ====
Overall								Home						Away					
Pld	W	D	L	GF	GA	GD	Pts	W	D	L	GF	GA	GD	W	D	L	GF	GA	GD
46	16	11	19	45	55	−10	59	9	5	9	22	29	−7	7	6	10	23	26	−3

Last updated: 4 May 2024.
Source: Soccerway

==== Results by round ====
Round	1	2	3	4	5	6	7	8	9	10	11	12	13	14	15	16	17	18	19	20	21	22	23	24	25	26	27	28	29	30	31	32	33	34	35	36	37	38	39	40	41	42	43	44	45	46
Ground	A	H	A	H	A	H	H	A	H	A	H	A	H	A	H	A	H	A	H	A	A	H	A	H	H	A	H	A	H	A	A	H	H	A	H	A	H	A	H	A	A	H	H	A	H	A
Result	W	L	L	W	D	L	W	D	L	W	D	D	L	D	L	W	L	L	D	L	L	D	D	W	W	W	L	L	D	L	L	L	L	W	W	D	W	L	D	L	L	W	W	W	W	W
Position	9	15	16	11	12	18	11	11	15	14	15	14	16	18	18	15	18	19	19	19	20	20	20	20	16	15	16	18	17	16	18	21	21	20	18	18	16	16	17	19	20	17	16	16	16	13

Updated to match(es) played on 4 May 2024. Source: Soccerway
A = Away; H = Home; W = Win; D = Draw; L = Loss

==== Matches ====
On 22 June, the EFL Championship fixtures were released.

Win Draw Loss Fixtures

5 August 2023 1	Middlesbrough	0–1	Millwall	Middlesbrough
15:00 BST	Howson (yellow card) 80'	Report	Bryan (yellow card) 25'; Nisbet (yellow card) 46'; Esse 79' Assist:Emakhu; Cooper (yellow card) 80'	Stadium: Riverside Stadium; Attendance: 29,359; Referee: Gavin Ward

12 August 2023 2	Millwall	0–1	Bristol City	Bermondsey
15:00 BST	Hutchinson (yellow card) 67'	Report	Williams (yellow card) 25'; Pring (yellow card) 69'; Vyner (yellow card) 88'; James 90+4'	Stadium: The Den; Attendance: 18,905; Referee: Keith Stroud

20 August 2023 3	Norwich City	3–1	Millwall	Norwich
12:00 BST	Rowe 25' (yellow card) 45+1'; Sargent 49'; Barnes 56'; Omobamidele (yellow card) 90+2'	Report	Mitchell (yellow card) 45+1'; Emakhu 90+1'	Stadium: Carrow Road; Referee: Tony Harrington
Note: Live on Sky Sports

26 August 2023 4	Millwall	1–0	Stoke City	Bermondsey
15:00 BST	Saville (yellow card) 7'; Nisbet 38'	Report	Laurent (yellow card) 18'; Wilmot (yellow card) 33'; Hoever (yellow card) 35'; Pearson (yellow card) 51'; McNally (yellow card) 82'	Stadium: The Den; Attendance: 15,254; Referee: David Webb

2 September 2023 5	Birmingham City	1–1	Millwall	Bordesley
12:30 BST	Hogan (penalty missed) 45+5; Bacuna (yellow card) 46'; Stansfield 53'	Report	Nisbet 6'; Harding (yellow card) 57'; Norton-Cuffy (yellow card) 59'	Stadium: St Andrew's Stadium; Attendance: 18,710; Referee: Josh Smith

17 September 2023 6	Millwall	0–3	Leeds United	Bermondsey
12:00 BST		Report	Piroe 15', 77'; Rutter 81'	Stadium: The Den; Attendance: 17,909; Referee: Chris Kavanagh

20 September 2023 7	Millwall	3–0	Rotherham United	Bermondsey
19:45 BST	Longman 27' (yellow card) 64'; Flemming 58'; Bradshaw 90+3'	Report	Revan (yellow card) 63'	Stadium: The Den; Attendance: 12,563 (259 away); Referee: Geoff Eltringham

23 September 2023 8	West Bromwich Albion	0–0	Millwall	West Bromwich
15:00 BST		Report	Flemming (penalty missed) 29'; McNamara (yellow card) 89'	Stadium: Hawthorns; Attendance: 22,325 (1,170 away); Referee: Tom Nield

30 September 2023 9	Millwall	0–3	Swansea City	Bermondsey
15:00 BST	Cooper (yellow card) 22'; Longman (yellow card) 45+3'	Report	Lowe 23' (pen.); Grimes 57'; Rushworth (yellow card) 66'; Cabango (yellow card) 73'; Kukharevych 79'	Stadium: The Den; Attendance: 14,803; Referee: John Busby

3 October 2023 10	Plymouth Argyle	0–2	Millwall	Plymouth
19:45 BST	Miller (yellow card) 31'; Pleguezuelo (yellow card) 63'	Report	McNamara (yellow card) 53'; Campbell (yellow card) 54'; Cooper (yellow card) 54'; Flemming 59'; Leonard (yellow card) 89'; Wallace (yellow card) 73'; Norton-Cuffy (yellow card) 90+7'; Saville 90+7'	Stadium: Home Park; Attendance: 15,891; Referee: Oliver Langford

7 October 2023 11	Millwall	2–2	Hull City	Bermondsey
15:00 BST	Watmore 8'; McNamara (yellow card) 9'; Harding (yellow card) 36'; de Norre (yellow card) 52'; Bryan 54' (yellow card) 90+1'	Report	Philogene 25'; Traoré 30'; Allsop (yellow card) 51'; Connolly (yellow card) 72'	Stadium: The Den; Attendance: 15,204; Referee: Tim Robinson

21 October 2023 12	Preston North End	1–1	Millwall	Preston
12:30 BST	Frøkjær-Jensen 3'; Holmes (yellow card) 19'; Cunningham (yellow card) 61'; Millar (yellow card) 63'; Lindsay (yellow card) 90+3'	Report	Flemming 30'; Emakhu (yellow card) 66'	Stadium: Deepdale; Attendance: 14,427; Referee: Matt Donohue

24 October 2023 13	Millwall	1–2	Blackburn Rovers	Bermondsey
19:45 BST	Harding 3'	Report	Rankin-Costello 22'; Brittain 51'; Dolan (yellow card) 90+3'	Stadium: The Den; Attendance: 13,834; Referee: Andy Davies

28 October 2023 14	Watford	2–2	Millwall	Watford
15:00 BST	Asprilla 7', (yellow card) 50'; Livermore (yellow card) 37'; Sema (yellow card) 79'; Rajović 90+2'	Report	Flemming 12', (yellow card) 27'; Saville (yellow card) 38'; Harding 86'; Norton-Cuffy (yellow card) 90+3'	Stadium: Vicarage Road; Attendance: 18,620; Referee: Keith Stroud

4 November 2023 15	Millwall	0–1	Southampton	Bermondsey
15:00 GMT	Wallace (yellow card) 55'; Longman (yellow card) 70'	Report	Downes (yellow card) 75'; Bednarek (yellow card) 90+1'; Fraser 90+3'	Stadium: The Den; Attendance: 18,905; Referee: James Linington

11 November 2023 16	Sheffield Wednesday	0–4	Millwall	Owlerton
15:00 GMT	Bernard (yellow card) 51'; Paterson (yellow card) 82'	Report	Wallace 31'; Cooper (yellow card) 41'; Saville 42' (yellow card) 72'; Harding 52'; Norton-Cuffy 72'	Stadium: Hillsborough Stadium; Attendance: 25,678; Referee: Gavin Ward

25 November 2023 17	Millwall	0–3	Coventry City	Bermondsey
15:00 GMT	Saville (yellow card) 22'; Wallace (yellow card) 76'	Report	Godden 30'; Sakamoto 67'; Thomas (yellow card) 86'; Sheaf 88'	Stadium: The Den; Attendance: 18,067; Referee: Darren England

29 November 2023 18	Ipswich Town	3–1	Millwall	Ipswich
20:00 GMT	Chaplin 5'; Luongo 12' (yellow card) 25'; Broadhead 39' (yellow card) 52'	Report	Flemming (yellow card) 37'; Honeyman (yellow card) 46'; De Norre (yellow card) 54'; Nisbet 78'	Stadium: Portman Road; Attendance: 27,702; Referee: Thomas Bramall

2 December 2023 19	Millwall	1–1	Sunderland	Bermondsey
15:00 GMT	Nisbet 44'; Saville (yellow card) 67'; Białkowski (yellow card) 75'; Cooper (yellow card) 78'; Bradshaw (yellow card) 81'; Watmore (yellow card) 90+4'	Report	Burstow (yellow card) 25'; Clarke (yellow card) 32' (goal) 78' (pen.); Ballard (yellow card) 45'	Stadium: The Den; Attendance: 17,815; Referee: James Linington

9 December 2023 20	Cardiff City	1–0	Millwall	Leckwith
15:00 GMT	Méïté (yellow card) 62'; Goutas 78'	Report	Hutchinson (yellow card) 63'; Leonard (yellow card) 78'	Stadium: Cardiff City Stadium; Attendance: 19,426; Referee: Andrew Kitchen

13 December 2023 21	Leicester City	3–2	Millwall	Leicester
19:45 GMT	Coady (yellow card) 37'; Vestergaard 48'; Daka 52'; Pereira 78'; Faes (yellow card) 82'	Report	Bradshaw 10'; Harding (yellow card) 13'; Cooper (yellow card) 21'; Wallace (yellow card) 24'; Saville (yellow card) 74'; Nisbet 90+3'	Stadium: King Power Stadium; Attendance: 28,960; Referee: Keith Stroud

16 December 2023 22	Millwall	1–1	Huddersfield Town	Bermondsey
15:00 GMT	Norton-Cuffy 57'	Report	Hogg (yellow card) 45+1'; Rudoni (yellow card) 71'; Burgzorg 90+7' (pen.)	Stadium: The Den; Attendance: 15,040; Referee: Darren Bond

23 December 2023 23	Stoke City	0–0	Millwall	Stoke-on-Trent
15:00 GMT	Rose (yellow card) 47'	Report	Mitchell (yellow card) 18'; Cooper (yellow card) 66'; Harding (yellow card) 79'	Stadium: bet365 Stadium; Attendance: 21,409; Referee: Geoff Eltringham

26 December 2023 24	Millwall	2–0	Queens Park Rangers	Bermondsey
13:00 GMT	Emakhu (yellow card) 32'; Honeyman (yellow card) 44'; Bradshaw 45+3'; Wallace 90+1', (yellow card) 90+3'	Report	Dunne (yellow card) 9'; Smyth (yellow card) 37'; Chair (yellow card) 75'	Stadium: The Den; Attendance: 17,432; Referee: Thomas Bramall

29 December 2023 25	Millwall	1–0	Norwich City	Bermondsey
19:45 GMT	Bradshaw 18'; Cooper (yellow card) 61'; Honeyman (yellow card) 81'; Saville (red card) 88'; Watmore (yellow card) 90+1'; Leonard (yellow card) 90+2'	Report	Barnes (yellow card) 60'; McLean (yellow card) 75'; Sargent (yellow card) 81'; Idah (yellow card) 90+3'; Núñez (yellow card) 90+8'	Stadium: The Den; Attendance: 17,715; Referee: Dean Whitestone

1 January 2024 26	Bristol City	0–1	Millwall	Bristol
15:00 GMT	Williams (yellow card) 90+7'	Report	Norton-Cuffy (yellow card) 74'; Hutchinson 90+2'; Leonard (yellow card) 90+7'	Stadium: Ashton Gate; Attendance: 21,755; Referee: Tom Nield

13 January 2024 27	Millwall	1–3	Middlesbrough	Bermondsey
15:00 GMT	Bryan 10' (yellow card) 80'; Honeyman (yellow card) 45+4'; Longman (yellow card) 51'	Report	Engel 38' (yellow card) 66'; Jones 58'; Forss 90+5'	Stadium: The Den; Attendance: 16,681; Referee: Andy Davies

20 January 2024 28	Queens Park Rangers	2–0	Millwall	Shepherd's Bush
15:00 GMT	Chair 27'; Armstrong 85'	Report	Mitchell (yellow card) 32'; Flemming (yellow card) 85'	Stadium: MATRADE Loftus Road; Attendance: 17,184; Referee: Bobby Madley

27 January 2024 29	Millwall	1–1	Preston North End	Bermondsey
15:00 GMT	Flemming 5', (yellow card) 90+4'; Honeyman (yellow card) 51'; Obafemi (yellow card) 90+1'	Report	Potts 33'; Storey (yellow card) 56'; Ledson (yellow card) 70'; Woodman (yellow card) 90+1'	Stadium: The Den; Attendance: 14,744; Referee: John Busby

3 February 2024 30	Hull City	1–0	Millwall	Kingston upon Hull
15:00 GMT	Philogene 5' (yellow card) 44'; Morton (yellow card) 51'; Carvalho (yellow card) 90+2'	Report	Wallace (yellow card) 48'; De Norre (yellow card) 82'	Stadium: The MKM Stadium; Attendance: 21,486; Referee: Anthony Backhouse

11 February 2024 31	Coventry City	2–1	Millwall	Coventry
12:00 GMT	Wright 67' (pen.), 70'	Report	Esse 12' (yellow card) 23'	Stadium: The Coventry Building Society Arena; Referee: Andrew Kitchen
Note: Fixture was previously scheduled for 10 February, but was moved to a day later for live Sky Sports coverage.

14 February 2024 32	Millwall	0–4	Ipswich Town	Bermondsey
20:00 GMT	McNamara (yellow card) 60'; Saville (yellow card) 84'; Leonard (yellow card) 88'	Report	Broadhead 24'; Harding 32' (o.g.); Moore 46'; Davis (yellow card) 58'; Al-Hamadi 90+3'	Stadium: The Den; Attendance: 15,890; Referee: Samuel Barrott
Note: Fixture was previously scheduled for a 19:45 kick-off, but was pushed back 15 minutes for live Sky Sports coverage.

17 February 2024 33	Millwall	0–2	Sheffield Wednesday	Bermondsey
15:00 GMT	Honeyman (yellow card) 28'; Saville (yellow card) 77'; Tangaga (yellow card) 90+3'	Report	Ugbo 31'; Musaba 41'; Vaulks (yellow card) 51'; Fletcher (yellow card) 90+1' (yellow-red card) 90+2'	Stadium: The Den; Attendance: 17,041; Referee: Geoff Eltringham

24 February 2024 34	Southampton	1–2	Millwall	Southampton
15:00 GMT	Adams 34'; Stephens (yellow card) 43'; Edozie (yellow card) 84'; Harwood-Bellis (yellow card) 90+5'; Walker-Peters (yellow card) 90+5'	Report	Tanganga 5', (yellow card) 13'; Honeyman (yellow card) 8'; Flemming 44' (pen.); Sarkic (yellow card) 90+1'	Stadium: St Mary's Stadium; Attendance: 30,629; Referee: Thomas Bramall

2 March 2024 35	Millwall	1–0	Watford	Bermondsey
15:00 GMT	Flemming 3', (yellow card) 90+1'; McNamara (yellow card) 45'; Leonard (yellow card) 75'	Report	Kaymebe (yellow card) 1'	Stadium: The Den; Attendance: 17,847; Referee: Gavin Ward

5 March 2024 36	Blackburn Rovers	1–1	Millwall	Blackburn
19:45 GMT	Szmodics 63'	Report	Tanganga (yellow card) 36'; Obafemi 54'	Stadium: Ewood Park; Attendance: 11,711; Referee: Jeremy Simpson

9 March 2024 37	Millwall	1–0	Birmingham City	Bermondsey
15:00 GMT	Leonard (yellow card) 64'; Bryan (yellow card) 87'; Tanganga 90'	Report	Buchanan (yellow card) 90+6'	Stadium: The Den; Attendance: 17,008; Referee: Darren Bond

17 March 2024 38	Leeds United	2–0	Millwall	Leeds
15:00 GMT	Gnonto (yellow card) 18', (goal) 33'; Firpo (yellow card) 29'; James 79'; Gruev (yellow card) 90+2'	Report	Cooper (yellow card) 18'; Flemming (yellow card) 25'; Leonard (yellow card) 53'; Honeyman (yellow card) 60'	Stadium: Elland Road; Attendance: 34,813; Referee: Stephen Martin

29 March 2024 39	Millwall	1–1	West Bromwich Albion	Bermondsey
13:00 GMT	Bryan (yellow card) 5'; Watmore 21'	Report	Bartley (yellow card) 17'; Kipré (yellow card) 60'; Swift 67' (pen.)	Stadium: The Den; Attendance: 17,856; Referee: James Bell

1 April 2024 40	Rotherham United	2–1	Millwall	Rotherham
15:00 BST	Revan 71'; Clucas (yellow card) 75'; Rinomhota (yellow card) 79'; Wyke 86'	Report	Longman 78'	Stadium: New York Stadium; Attendance: 9,803; Referee: Alex Chilowicz

6 April 2024 41	Huddersfield Town	1–0	Millwall	Huddersfield
15:00 BST	Jackson (yellow card) 35'; Thomas (yellow card) 61'; Edwards (yellow card) 90+2'; Healey 90+4'; Nicholls (yellow card) 90+7'	Report	Leonard (yellow card) 41'; Saville (yellow card) 59'; Mitchell (yellow card) 61'; McNamara (yellow card) 90+2'	Stadium: Kirklees Stadium; Attendance: 18,569; Referee: James Linington

9 April 2024 42	Millwall	1–0	Leicester City	Bermondsey
19:45 BST	Honeyman (yellow card) 11'; Longman 59'; Saville (yellow card) 83'; Šarkić (yellow card) 90+6'	Report	Winks (yellow card) 21'	Stadium: The Den; Attendance: 14,889; Referee: Sunny Singh Gill

13 April 2024 43	Millwall	3–1	Cardiff City	Bermondsey
15:00 BST	Obafemi 9'; Cooper 45+4'; Longman (yellow card) 69'; Saville (yellow card) 90+1'; Watmore 90+3', (yellow card) 90+4'	Report	Méïté 24'; Collins (yellow card) 69'	Stadium: The Den; Attendance: 17,151; Referee: Will Finnie

20 April 2024 44	Sunderland	0–1	Millwall	Sunderland
15:00 BST	Clarke (yellow card) 12'; Ballard (yellow card) 87'; Bellingham (yellow card) 90+1'	Report	Obafemi (yellow card) 43'; Ballard 71' (o.g.); Flemming (yellow card) 87'	Stadium: Stadium of Light; Attendance: 40,743; Referee: Anthony Backhouse

27 April 2024 45	Millwall	1–0	Plymouth Argyle	Bermondsey
15:00 BST	Cooper 83'	Report		Stadium: The Den; Attendance: 17,863; Referee: Andy Davies

4 May 2024 46	Swansea City	0–1	Millwall	Landore
12:30 BST	Yates (red card) 84'; Abdulai (yellow card) 90'	Report	Cooper (yellow card) 65'; De Norre 72'; Tanganga (red card) 85'; McNamara (yellow card) 90'	Stadium: Swansea.com Stadium; Attendance: 17,661; Referee: Geoff Eltringham

=== FA Cup ===
As a Championship club, Millwall entered the FA Cup in the third round and were drawn at home to Leicester City.

Win Draw Loss Fixtures

6 January 2024 Third round	Millwall	2–3	Leicester City	Bermondsey
12:30 GMT	Watmore 56'; Flemming (yellow card) 69', (goal) 86'	Report	Casadei 16'; Pereira 39'; Cannon 61', (yellow card) 90+3'	Stadium: The Den; Attendance: 10,092; Referee: Oliver Langford

=== EFL Cup ===
Millwall were drawn at home to Reading in the first round.

Win Draw Loss Fixtures

8 August 2023 First round	Millwall	0–4	Reading	Bermondsey
19:45 BST		Report	Ehibhatiomhan 1', 51'; Savage 67'; Camara 88'	Stadium: The Den; Attendance: 4,738; Referee: Leigh Doughty

== Statistics ==
=== Overall Stats ===
As of 5 August 2023

No.	Pos	Nat	Player	Total		Championship		FA Cup		League Cup	
No.	Pos	Nat	Player	Apps	Goals	Apps	Goals	Apps	Goals	Apps	Goals
1	GK	(England) ENG	George Long	0	0	0+0	0	0+0	0	0+0	0
2	DF	(Republic of Ireland) IRL	Danny McNamara	2	0	1+0	0	0+0	0	1+0	0
3	DF	(Scotland) SCO	Murray Wallace	2	0	1+0	0	0+0	0	1+0	0
4	DF	(England) ENG	Shaun Hutchinson	2	0	1+0	0	0+0	0	1+0	0
5	DF	(England) ENG	Jake Cooper	2	0	1+0	0	0+0	0	1+0	0
6	MF	(England) ENG	George Evans	1	0	0+0	0	0+0	0	0+1	0
7	FW	(Scotland) SCO	Kevin Nisbet	2	0	1+0	0	0+0	0	0+1	0
8	MF	(England) ENG	Billy Mitchell	2	0	1+0	0	0+0	0	1+0	0
9	FW	(Wales) WAL	Tom Bradshaw	2	0	0+1	0	0+0	0	1+0	0
10	MF	(Netherlands) NED	Zian Flemming	2	0	1+0	0	0+0	0	1+0	0
14	FW	(England) ENG	Tyler Burey	0	0	0+0	0	0+0	0	0+0	0
15	DF	(England) ENG	Joe Bryan	2	0	1+0	0	0+0	0	0+1	0
18	MF	(England) ENG	Ryan Leonard	2	0	0+1	0	0+0	0	1+0	0
19	FW	(England) ENG	Duncan Watmore	1	0	1+0	0	0+0	0	0+0	0
20	GK	(Montenegro) MNE	Matija Sarkic	1	0	1+0	0	0+0	0	0+0	0
21	FW	(Germany) GER	Andreas Voglsammer	1	0	0+0	0	0+0	0	0+1	0
22	FW	(Republic of Ireland) IRL	Aidomo Emakhu	2	0	0+1	0	0+0	0	0+1	0
23	MF	(Northern Ireland) NIR	George Saville	2	0	0+1	0	0+0	0	1+0	0
24	MF	(Belgium) BEL	Casper de Norre	1	0	1+0	0	0+0	0	0+0	0
25	MF	(England) ENG	Romain Esse	2	1	0+1	1	0+0	0	1+0	0
26	DF	(England) ENG	Alex Mitchell	0	0	0+0	0	0+0	0	0+0	0
27	GK	(England) ENG	Connal Trueman	0	0	0+0	0	0+0	0	0+0	0
33	GK	(Poland) POL	Bartosz Białkowski	1	0	0+0	0	0+0	0	1+0	0
39	MF	(England) ENG	George Honeyman	0	0	0+0	0	0+0	0	0+0	0
45	DF	(England) ENG	Wes Harding	1	0	0+0	0	0+0	0	0+1	0
46	DF	(England) ENG	Niino Adom-Malaki	0	0	0+0	0	0+0	0	0+0	0

==== Goals record ====
As of 5 August 2023

Rank	No.	Nat.	Po.	Name	Championship	FA Cup	League Cup	Total
1	25	(England)	CAM	Romain Esse	1	0	0	1
Total					1	0	0	1

=== Disciplinary record ===
As of 5 August 2023

Rank	No.	Nat.	Po.	Name	Championship			FA Cup			League Cup			Total		
Rank	No.	Nat.	Po.	Name	Yellow card	(yellow card) (yellow-red card)	Red card	Yellow card	(yellow card) (yellow-red card)	Red card	Yellow card	(yellow card) (yellow-red card)	Red card	Yellow card	(yellow card) (yellow-red card)	Red card
1	15	(England)	LB	Joe Bryan	1	0	0	0	0	0	1	0	0	2	0	0
2
2	5	(England)	CB	Jake Cooper	1	0	0	0	0	0	0	0	0	1	0	0
2	6	(England)	CB	George Evans	0	0	0	0	0	0	1	0	0	1	0	0
2	7	(Scotland)	CF	Kevin Nisbet	1	0	0	0	0	0	0	0	0	1	0	0
2	18	(England)	CDM	Ryan Leonard	0	0	0	0	0	0	1	0	0	1	0	0
2	23	(Northern Ireland)	CDM	George Saville	0	0	0	0	0	0	1	0	0	1	0	0
Total					3	0	0	0	0	0	4	0	0	7	0	0
