= Billy Mitchell (footballer, born 2001) =

English footballer

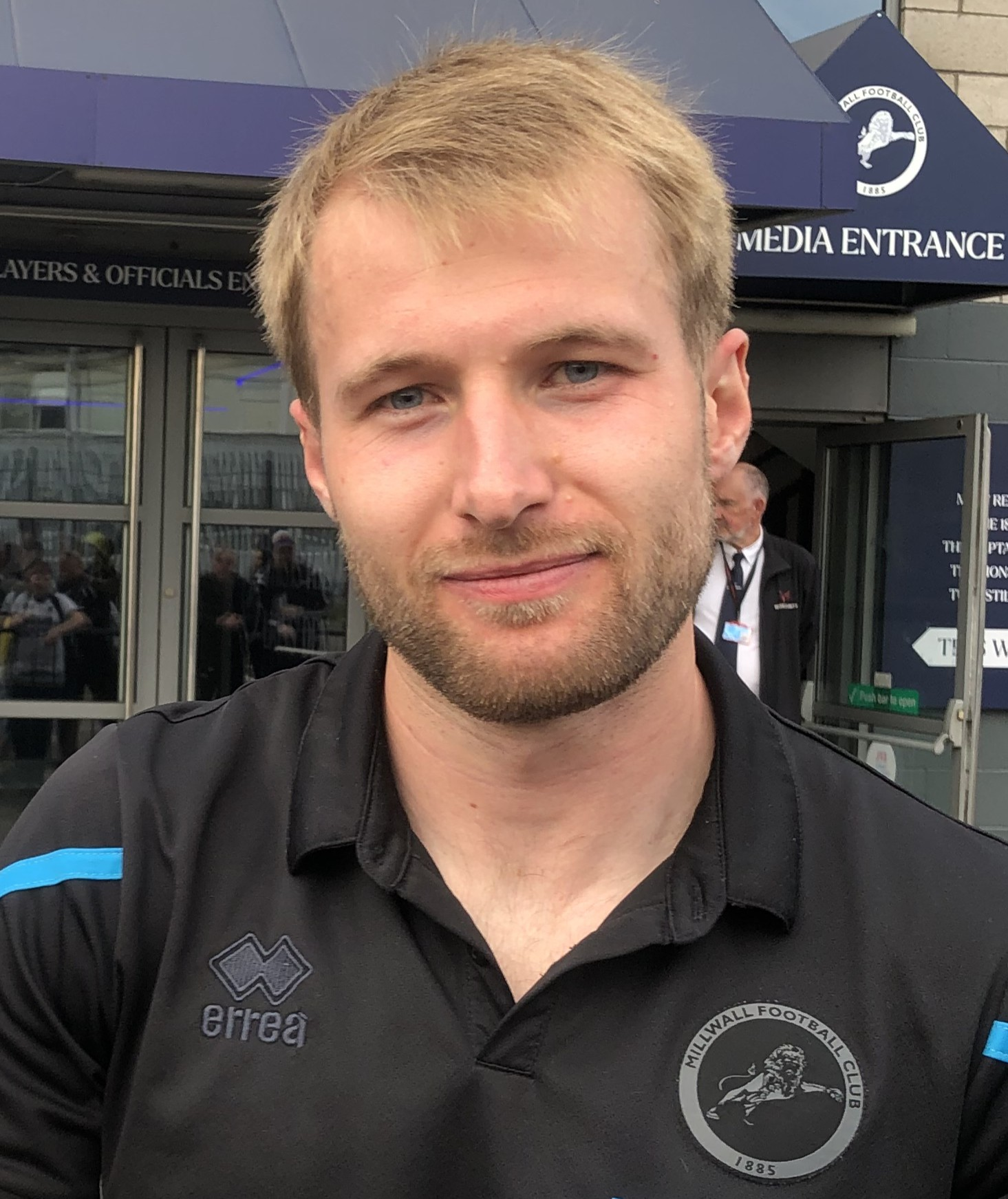
- Billy Mitchell in 2025.

Personal information
- Full name: Billy James Mitchell
- Date of birth: 7 April 2001 (age 25)
- Place of birth: Orpington, England
- Height: 1.78 m (5 ft 10 in)
- Position: Defensive midfielder

Team information
- Current team: Sheffield Wednesday
- Number: 16

Youth career
- 2015–2019: Millwall

Senior career*
Years	Team	Apps	(Gls)
2019–2026	Millwall	184	(1)
2026–	Sheffield Wednesday	13	(1)
- * Club domestic league appearances and goals as of 22:00, 20 November 2026 (UTC)

Billy James Mitchell (born 7 April 2001) is an English professional footballer who plays as a defensive midfielder for EFL League One club Sheffield Wednesday.

== Career ==
=== Millwall ===
Mitchell hails from Orpington, but moved to Sidcup with his mother and brother when he was 15. He joined his boyhood club Millwall at under-15 level. His father's family originates from Bermondsey and are also Millwall fans, so is his maternal great-grandfather. He made his first team debut in the last game of the season on 5 May 2019, coming on a late substitute in the 1–0 defeat to Wigan Athletic. In the summer of 2019 he signed his first professional contract, a one-year deal. In April 2021, he signed a new long term deal with Millwall. He scored his first professional goal in a 4–1 win against Bristol City on 1 May 2021. Mitchell was awarded the PFA Championship Players in the Community award for the 2021–22 season after becoming heavily involved in Millwall's Community Trust.

=== Sheffield Wednesday ===
On 19 July 2026, Mitchell joined League One side Sheffield Wednesday on a three-year contract. He made his debut on 20 August 2026, starting the game in the 0–1 defeat to Bradford City. He scored his first Wednesday goal in November 2026 against Plymouth Argyle, smashing the ball into the net via a deflection on the stroke of half time.

== Personal life ==
Mitchell is the brother of Charlton Athletic player Zach Mitchell.

== Career statistics ==
As of 20 November 2026

Appearances and goals by club, season and competition
Club	Season	League			FA Cup		EFL Cup		Other		Total	
Club	Season	Division	Apps	Goals	Apps	Goals	Apps	Goals	Apps	Goals	Apps	Goals
Millwall	2018–19	Championship	1	0	0	0	0	0	—		1	0
Millwall	2019–20	Championship	7	0	2	0	1	0	—		10	0
Millwall	2020–21	Championship	16	1	0	0	0	0	—		16	1
Millwall	2021–22	Championship	42	0	1	0	2	0	—		45	0
Millwall	2022–23	Championship	36	0	0	0	0	0	—		36	0
Millwall	2023–24	Championship	34	0	1	0	1	0	—		36	0
Millwall	2024–25	Championship	19	0	3	0	0	0	—		22	0
Millwall	2025–26	Championship	29	0	1	0	0	0	—		30	0
Millwall	Total		184	1	8	0	4	0	0	0	196	1
Sheffield Wednesday	2026–27	League One	13	1	0	0	1	0	1 (Note: Appearance(s) in EFL Trophy)	0	15	1
Career total			197	2	8	0	5	0	1	0	211	2
