= 2019–20 Leeds United F.C. season =

2019–20 season of Leeds United

Leeds United
2019–20 season
- Chairman: Andrea Radrizzani
- Manager: Marcelo Bielsa
- Stadium: Elland Road
- Championship: 1st (promoted)
- FA Cup: Third round
- EFL Cup: Second round
- Top goalscorer: League: Patrick Bamford (16); All: Patrick Bamford (16)
- Highest home attendance: 36,514 vs Huddersfield Town (7 March 2020, Championship)
- Lowest home attendance: 30,002 vs Stoke City (27 August 2019, EFL Cup)
- Average home league attendance: 35,320 (Note: Only matches with spectators present are included in the average.)
Home colours	Away colours	Third colours

The 2019–20 season saw Leeds United competing in the Championship (known as the Sky Bet Championship for sponsorship reasons) for a tenth successive season.

== Pre-season and friendlies ==
Leeds United announced pre-season friendlies against York City, Guiseley, Manchester United, Western Sydney Wanderers and Cagliari.

Win Draw Loss Fixtures

10 July 2019 Friendly	York City	0–5	Leeds United	York
19:00 BST		Report	Harrison 3', 44'; Roofe 22'; Hernandez 34'; Forshaw 53'	Stadium: Bootham Crescent; Attendance: 5,180; Referee: Ross Joyce

11 July 2019 Friendly	Guiseley	1–2	Leeds United	Guiseley
19:45 BST	Felix 9'	Report	Costa 68'; Bogusz 79'	Stadium: Nethermoor Park; Referee: Jon Moss

17 July 2019 Friendly	Manchester United	4–0	Leeds United	Perth, Australia
19:00 AWST	Greenwood 7'; Rashford 27'; Jones 51'; Martial 69' (pen.)	Report		Stadium: Optus Stadium; Attendance: 55,274; Referee: Shaun Evans

17 July 2019 Friendly	Tadcaster Albion	1–5	Leeds United	Tadcaster
BST	Day 49'	Report	Edmondson 10', 64', 75'; Clarke 20'; Gotts 45'	Stadium: i2i Stadium

20 July 2019 Friendly	Western Sydney Wanderers	1–2	Leeds United	Sydney, Australia
19:00 AWST	Yeboah 48'	Report	Bogusz 9'; Hernández 90+5'	Stadium: Western Sydney Stadium; Attendance: 24,419; Referee: Kurt Ams

22 July 2019 Friendly	Leeds United	2–4	Al-Ittihad	Wetherby
BST	Kilch 35'; Alioski 71'		Romarinho 4'; Al-Aboud 19'; Prijović 30'; Jiménez 43'	Stadium: Thorp Arch

27 July 2019 Friendly	Cagliari	1–1	Leeds United	Sardinia, Italy
20:30 CEST	Birsa 14'	Report	Hernández 49' (pen.)	Stadium: Sardegna Arena; Referee: Valerio Marini

28 July 2019 Friendly	Girona	2–3	Leeds United	Manchester
BST	Granell 68' (pen.); Mojica 82'	Report	Oduor 8'; Harrison 41'; Alioski 76' (pen.)	Stadium: Etihad Campus

== Competitions ==
=== League table ===
Pos	Team	Pld	W	D	L	GF	GA	GD	Pts	Promotion, qualification or relegation
1	Leeds United (C, P)	46	28	9	9	77	35	+42	93	Promotion to the Premier League
2	West Bromwich Albion (P)	46	22	17	7	77	45	+32	83	Promotion to the Premier League
3	Brentford	46	24	9	13	80	38	+42	81	Qualification for Championship play-offs (Note: Four teams play for one spot and promotion to the Premier League.)
4	Fulham (O, P)	46	23	12	11	64	48	+16	81	Qualification for Championship play-offs
5	Cardiff City	46	19	16	11	68	58	+10	73	Qualification for Championship play-offs
6	Swansea City	46	18	16	12	62	53	+9	70	Qualification for Championship play-offs

Source: EFL Official Website
Rules for classification: 1) Points; 2) Goal difference; 3) Number of goals scored; 4) Head-to-head results; 5) Wins; 6) Away goals; 7) Penalty points (sec 9.5); 8) 12-point sending off offences
(C) Champions; (O) Play-off winners; (P) Promoted

==== Results summary ====
Overall								Home						Away					
Pld	W	D	L	GF	GA	GD	Pts	W	D	L	GF	GA	GD	W	D	L	GF	GA	GD
46	28	9	9	77	35	+42	93	15	5	3	40	14	+26	13	4	6	37	21	+16

Source: BBC

==== Results by matchday ====
Matchday	1	2	3	4	5	6	7	8	9	10	11	12	13	14	15	16	17	18	19	20	21	22	23	24	25	26	27	28	29	30	31	32	33	34	35	36	37	38	39	40	41	42	43	44	45	46
Ground	A	H	A	H	A	H	A	H	A	H	A	H	A	A	H	H	A	A	H	A	H	H	A	H	A	A	H	A	H	H	A	A	H	H	A	A	H	A	H	H	A	H	A	H	A	H
Result	W	D	W	W	W	L	W	D	L	W	L	W	D	D	W	W	W	W	W	W	W	D	L	D	W	D	L	L	W	L	L	D	W	W	W	W	W	L	W	D	W	W	W	W	W	W
Position	1	3	1	1	1	3	1	1	4	1	5	2	2	3	2	3	2	2	2	2	2	1	1	2	2	1	2	2	2	2	2	2	2	2	2	1	2	1	2	1	1	1	1	1	1	1

Source: Statto.com
A = Away; H = Home; W = Win; D = Draw; L = Loss

==== Matches ====
4 August 2019 1	Bristol City	1–3	Leeds United	Bristol
16:30 BST	Weimann 79'	Report	Hernández 26'; Bamford 57'; Harrison 72'	Stadium: Ashton Gate Stadium; Attendance: 23,553; Referee: Tim Robinson

10 August 2019 2	Leeds United	1–1	Nottingham Forest	Leeds
12:30 BST	Hernández 59'	Report	Grabban 77'	Stadium: Elland Road; Attendance: 35,453; Referee: Robert Jones

17 August 2019 3	Wigan Athletic	0–2	Leeds United	Wigan
15:00 BST		Report	Bamford 34', 65'	Stadium: DW Stadium; Attendance: 14,819; Referee: Andrew Madley

21 August 2019 4	Leeds United	1–0	Brentford	Leeds
19:45 BST	Nketiah 81'	Report		Stadium: Elland Road; Attendance: 35,004; Referee: Andy Davies

24 August 2019 5	Stoke City	0–3	Leeds United	Stoke
15:00 BST		Report	Dallas 42'; Alioski 50'; Bamford 66'	Stadium: Bet365 Stadium; Attendance: 24,090; Referee: Darren England

31 August 2019 6	Leeds United	0–1	Swansea City	Leeds
15:00 BST		Report	Routledge 90'	Stadium: Elland Road; Attendance: 34,935; Referee: Darren Bond

15 September 2019 7	Barnsley	0–2	Leeds United	Barnsley
12:30 BST		Report	Nketiah 84'; Klich 89' (pen.)	Stadium: Oakwell; Attendance: 17,598; Referee: Keith Stroud

21 September 2019 8	Leeds United	1–1	Derby County	Leeds
12:30 BST	Lowe 20' (o.g.)	Report	Martin 90+1'	Stadium: Elland Road; Attendance: 34,714; Referee: Oliver Langford

28 September 2019 9	Charlton Athletic	1–0	Leeds United	Charlton
15:00 BST	Bonne 32'	Report		Stadium: The Valley; Attendance: 21,808; Referee: John Brooks

1 October 2019 10	Leeds United	1–0	West Bromwich Albion	Leeds
19:45 BST	Bartley 38' (o.g.)	Report		Stadium: Elland Road; Attendance: 34,648; Referee: David Coote

5 October 2019 11	Millwall	2–1	Leeds United	Bermondsey
15:00 BST	J. Wallace 16' (pen.); Bradshaw 45'	Report	Alioski 46'	Stadium: The Den; Attendance: 16,311; Referee: James Linington

19 October 2019 12	Leeds United	1–0	Birmingham City	Leeds
15:00 BST	Phillips 65'	Report		Stadium: Elland Road; Attendance: 35,731; Referee: Robert Jones

22 October 2019 13	Preston North End	1–1	Leeds United	Preston
19:45 BST	Barkhuizen 74'	Report	Nketiah 87'	Stadium: Deepdale; Attendance: 18,275; Referee: Kevin Friend

26 October 2019 14	Sheffield Wednesday	0–0	Leeds United	Sheffield
12:30 BST		Report		Stadium: Hillsborough Stadium; Attendance: 27,516; Referee: Tim Robinson

2 November 2019 15	Leeds United	2–0	Queens Park Rangers	Leeds
15:00 GMT	Roberts 39'; Harrison 82'	Report		Stadium: Elland Road; Attendance: 35,284; Referee: Geoff Eltringham

9 November 2019 16	Leeds United	2–1	Blackburn Rovers	Leeds
15:00 GMT	Bamford 30' (pen.); Harrison 35'	Report	Williams 40'	Stadium: Elland Road; Attendance: 35,567; Referee: Gavin Ward

23 November 2019 17	Luton Town	1–2	Leeds United	Luton
15:00 GMT	Collins 54'	Report	Bamford 51'; Pearson 90' (o.g.)	Stadium: Kenilworth Road; Attendance: 10,068; Referee: John Brooks

26 November 2019 18	Reading	0–1	Leeds United	Reading
20:00 GMT		Report	Harrison 87'	Stadium: Madejski Stadium; Attendance: 16,918; Referee: Darren Bond

30 November 2019 19	Leeds United	4–0	Middlesbrough	Leeds
15:00 GMT	Bamford 3', (yellow card) 22'; Klich 45+3', 73'; Costa 67'	Report		Stadium: Elland Road; Attendance: 35,626; Referee: Keith Stroud

7 December 2019 20	Huddersfield Town	0–2	Leeds United	Huddersfield
12:30 GMT		Report	Alioski 50'; Hernández 78'	Stadium: John Smith's Stadium; Attendance: 23,805; Referee: Gavin Ward

10 December 2019 21	Leeds United	2–0	Hull City	Leeds
19:45 GMT	de Wijs 73' (o.g.); Alioski 82'	Report		Stadium: Elland Road; Attendance: 35,200; Referee: David Webb

14 December 2019 22	Leeds United	3–3	Cardiff City	Leeds
15:00 GMT	Costa 6'; Bamford 8', 52' (pen.)	Report	Tomlin 60'; Morrison 82'; Glatzel 88'	Stadium: Elland Road; Attendance: 34,552; Referee: Tony Harrington

21 December 2019 23	Fulham	2–1	Leeds United	Fulham
15:00 GMT	Mitrović 7' (pen.); Onomah 69'	Report	Bamford 54'	Stadium: Craven Cottage; Attendance: 18,878; Referee: Tim Robinson

26 December 2019 24	Leeds United	1–1	Preston North End	Leeds
17:15 GMT	Dallas 89'	Report	Browne 22'	Stadium: Elland Road; Attendance: 35,638; Referee: Darren Bond

29 December 2019 25	Birmingham City	4–5	Leeds United	Birmingham
15:00 GMT	Bellingham 27'; Jutkiewicz 61', 90+1'; Bela 83'	Report	Costa 15'; Harrison 21'; Ayling 69'; Dallas 84'; Harding 90+5' (o.g.)	Stadium: St Andrew's; Attendance: 22,059; Referee: Keith Stroud

1 January 2020 26	West Bromwich Albion	1–1	Leeds United	West Bromwich
17:15 GMT	Ajayi 2'	Report	Ajayi 52' (o.g.)	Stadium: The Hawthorns; Attendance: 25,618; Referee: Robert Jones

11 January 2020 27	Leeds United	0–2	Sheffield Wednesday	Leeds
15:00 GMT		Report	Nuhiu 90+4'; Murphy 87'	Stadium: Elland Road; Attendance: 36,422; Referee: Oliver Langford

18 January 2020 28	Queens Park Rangers	1–0	Leeds United	Shepherd's Bush
12:30 GMT	Wells 20'	Report		Stadium: Loftus Road; Attendance: 16,049; Referee: Peter Bankes

28 January 2020 29	Leeds United	3–2	Millwall	Leeds
19:45 GMT	Bamford 48', 66'; +Hernández 62'	Report	Hutchinson 4'; Wallace 23' (pen.)	Stadium: Elland Road; Attendance: 34,006; Referee: Darren England

1 February 2020 30	Leeds United	0–1	Wigan Athletic	Leeds
15:00 GMT		Report	Hernández 59' (o.g.)	Stadium: Elland Road; Attendance: 35,162; Referee: Tony Harrington

8 February 2020 31	Nottingham Forest	2–0	Leeds United	Nottingham
17:30 GMT	Ameobi 31'; Walker 90+4'	Report		Stadium: City Ground; Attendance: 29,455; Referee: Oliver Langford

11 February 2020 32	Brentford	1–1	Leeds United	Brentford
19:45 GMT	Benrahma 25'	Report	Cooper 38'	Stadium: Griffin Park; Attendance: 12,294; Referee: Robert Jones

15 February 2020 33	Leeds United	1–0	Bristol City	Leeds
15:00 GMT	Ayling 16'	Report		Stadium: Elland Road; Attendance: 35,819; Referee: Tim Robinson

22 February 2020 34	Leeds United	1–0	Reading	Leeds
15:00 GMT	Hernández 57'	Report		Stadium: Elland Road; Attendance: 35,483; Referee: Jarred Gillett

26 February 2020 35	Middlesbrough	0–1	Leeds United	Middlesbrough
19:45 GMT		Report	Klich 45+1'	Stadium: Riverside Stadium; Attendance: 24,647; Referee: Gavin Ward

29 February 2020 36	Hull City	0–4	Leeds United	Hull
12:30 GMT		Report	Ayling 5'; Hernández 47'; Roberts 81', 84'	Stadium: KCOM Stadium; Attendance: 16,178; Referee: Keith Stroud

7 March 2020 37	Leeds United	2–0	Huddersfield Town	Leeds
15:00 GMT	Ayling 3'; Bamford 51'	Report		Stadium: Elland Road; Attendance: 36,514; Referee: Oliver Langford

21 June 2020 38	Cardiff City	2–0	Leeds United	Cardiff
12:00 BST	Hoilett 35'; Glatzel 71'	Report		Stadium: Cardiff City Stadium; Attendance: 0 Referee: Andy Woolmer

27 June 2020 39	Leeds United	3–0	Fulham	Leeds
15:00 BST	Bamford 10'; Alioski 56'; Harrison 71'	Report		Stadium: Elland Road; Attendance: 0 Referee: Tony Harrington

30 June 2020 40	Leeds United	1–1	Luton Town	Leeds
19:45 BST	Dallas 63'	Report	Cornick 50'	Stadium: Elland Road; Attendance: 0 Referee: John Brooks

4 July 2020 41	Blackburn Rovers	1–3	Leeds United	Blackburn
15:00 BST	Armstrong 48'	Report	Bamford 7'; Klich 53'; Phillips 40'	Stadium: Ewood Park; Attendance: 0 Referee: Robert Jones

9 July 2020 42	Leeds United	5–0	Stoke City	Leeds
17:00 BST	Klich 45' (pen.); Costa 47'; Cooper 57'; Hernández 72'; Bamford 90+3'	Report		Stadium: Elland Road; Attendance: 0 Referee: Darren Bond

12 July 2020 43	Swansea City	0–1	Leeds United	Swansea
13:30 BST		Report	Hernández 89'	Stadium: Liberty Stadium; Attendance: 0 Referee: Keith Stroud

16 July 2020 44	Leeds United	1–0	Barnsley	Leeds
17:00 BST	Sollbauer 28' (o.g.)	Report		Stadium: Elland Road; Attendance: 0 Referee: Jarred Gillett

19 July 2020 45	Derby County	1–3	Leeds United	Derby
14:00 BST	Martin 54'	Report	Hernández 56'; Shackleton 75'; Clarke 84' (o.g.)	Stadium: Pride Park; Attendance: 0 Referee: Oliver Langford

22 July 2020 46	Leeds United	4–0	Charlton Athletic	Leeds
19:30 BST	White 14'; Dallas 28'; Roberts 52'; Shackleton 66'	Report		Stadium: Elland Road; Attendance: 0 Referee: Geoff Eltringham

=== FA Cup ===
6 January 2020 Third round	Arsenal	1–0	Leeds United	Holloway
19:56 GMT	Nelson 55'	Report		Stadium: Emirates Stadium; Attendance: 58,403; Referee: Anthony Taylor

=== EFL Cup ===
13 August 2019 First round	Salford City	0–3	Leeds United	Salford
19:45 BST		Report	Nketiah 43'; Berardi 50'; Klich 58'	Stadium: Peninsula Stadium; Attendance: 4,518; Referee: Keith Stroud

27 August 2019 Second round	Leeds United	2–2 (4–5 p)	Stoke City	Leeds
19:45 BST	Nketiah 67'; Costa 81'	Report	Batth 39'; Vokes 44'	Stadium: Elland Road; Attendance: 30,002; Referee: Oliver Langford
	Penalties
	Douglas (penalty scored); Costa (penalty scored); Phillips (penalty scored); Nketiah (penalty scored); Harrison (penalty missed)		Vokes (penalty scored); Duffy (penalty scored); Etebo (penalty scored); Clucas (penalty scored); Butland (penalty scored)

== Statistics ==
No.	Pos.	Name	League		FA Cup		EFL Cup		Total		Discipline	
No.	Pos.	Name	Apps	Goals	Apps	Goals	Apps	Goals	Apps	Goals	Yellow card	Red card
1	GK	(France) Illan Meslier	10	0	1	0	0	0	11	0	0	0
2	DF	(England) Luke Ayling	35+2	4	1	0	0	0	36+2	4	9	0
3	DF	(Scotland) Barry Douglas	6+9	0	1	0	1	0	7+9	0	0	0
4	MF	(England) Adam Forshaw	6+1	0	0	0	0+1	0	6+2	0	3	0
5	DF	(England) Ben White	46	1	1	0	1+1	0	48+1	0	6	0
6	DF	(Scotland) Liam Cooper	36+2	2	0	0	0	0	36+2	2	2	0
7	FW	(England) Ian Poveda	1+3	0	0	0	0	0	1+3	0	0	0
9	FW	(England) Patrick Bamford	43+2	16	1	0	0+1	0	44+3	16	0	0
10	DF	(North Macedonia) Ezgjan Alioski	21+18	5	1	0	1	0	23+18	5	8	0
11	FW	(Wales) Tyler Roberts	12+11	4	0	0	0	0	12+11	4	0	0
13	GK	(Spain) Kiko Casilla	36	0	0	0	2	0	38	0	2	0
14	FW	(England) Eddie Nketiah	2+15	3	0	0	2	2	4+15	5	0	0
15	DF	(Northern Ireland) Stuart Dallas	45	5	0+1	0	0	0	45+1	5	7	0
17	FW	(Portugal) Hélder Costa	33+10	4	0+1	0	2	1	35+11	5	0	0
19	MF	(Spain) Pablo Hernández	27+9	9	0	0	0	0	27+9	9	6	0
22	MF	(England) Jack Harrison	45+1	6	1	0	0+2	0	46+3	6	1	0
23	MF	(England) Kalvin Phillips	37	2	1	0	2	0	40	2	9	1
28	DF	(Switzerland) Gaetano Berardi	13+9	0	1	0	2	1	16+9	0	1	0
29	FW	(France) Jean-Kévin Augustin	0+3	0	0	0	0	0	0+3	0	0	0
34	DF	(Netherlands) Pascal Struijk	2+3	0	0	0	0	0	2+3	0	1	0
36	MF	(England) Robbie Gotts	0+1	0	1	0	0	0	1+1	0	0	0
38	MF	(Northern Ireland) Alfie McCalmont	0	0	0	0	1+1	0	1+1	0	0	0
40	DF	(England) Leif Davis	0+3	0	0	0	2	0	2+3	0	0	0
43	MF	(Poland) Mateusz Klich	44	6	1	0	1	1	46	7	8	0
44	MF	(Poland) Mateusz Bogusz	0+1	0	0	0	1	0	1+1	0	0	0
46	MF	(England) Jamie Shackleton	5+17	2	0	0	2	0	7+17	0	0	0
47	MF	(England) Jack Clarke	0+1	0	0	0	2	0	2+1	0	0	0
48	MF	(England) Jordan Stevens	0+4	0	0+1	0	0	0	0+5	0	0	0
49	DF	(England) Oliver Casey	0+1	0	0	0	0	0	0+1	0	0	0

== Transfers ==
=== In ===
Date	Pos.	Name	From	Fee	Ref.
1 July 2019	MF	(Scotland) Stuart McKinstry	(Scotland) Motherwell	£400,000	
1 July 2019	MF	(Scotland) Liam McCarron	(England) Carlisle United	Undisclosed	
4 July 2019	FW	(Spain) Rafa Mújica	(Spain) Barcelona	Free	
4 July 2019	MF	(Spain) Guillermo Amor	(Spain) Barcelona	Free	
4 July 2019	MF	(England) Alfie Hughes	(England) Manchester United	Undisclosed	
29 August 2019	MF	(England) Josh Galloway	(England) Carlisle United	Undisclosed	
21 January 2020	GK	(Italy) Elia Caprile	(Italy) Chievo Verona	Undisclosed	
24 January 2020	FW	(England) Ian Poveda	(England) Manchester City	Undisclosed	
7 July 2020	FW	(Portugal) Hélder Costa	(England) Wolverhampton Wanderers	Undisclosed	

=== Out ===
Date	Pos.	Name	To	Fee	Ref.
1 July 2019	DF	(England) Lucas Odunston	Unattached	Released	
1 July 2019	MF	(England) Alex Wollerton	Unattached	Released	
1 July 2019	GK	(England) Joshua Rae	Unattached	Released	
2 July 2019	FW	(England) Jack Clarke	(England) Tottenham Hotspur	£11,000,000	
3 July 2019	FW	(Ghana) Caleb Ekuban	(Turkey) Trabzonspor	£2,000,000	
3 July 2019	DF	(Finland) Aapo Halme	(England) Barnsley	Undisclosed	
5 July 2019	FW	(England) Malik Wilks	(England) Barnsley	£1,000,000	
8 July 2019	DF	(Sweden) Pontus Jansson	(England) Brentford	£5,500,000	
8 July 2019	DF	(England) Liam Kitching	(England) Forest Green Rovers	Undisclosed	
11 July 2019	DF	(England) Tyler Denton	(England) Stevenage	Undisclosed	
12 July 2019	DF	(England) Sam Dalby	(England) Watford	Undisclosed	
16 July 2019	MF	(Mali) Hadi Sacko	(Turkey) Denizlispor	£1,000,000	
18 July 2019	DF	(Republic of Ireland) Paudie O'Connor	(England) Bradford City	Free	
18 July 2019	DF	(Spain) Oriol Rey	(Spain) Real Valladolid	Free	
18 July 2019	MF	(Spain) Samuel Sáiz	(Spain) Girona	£2,500,000	
19 July 2019	MF	(Spain) Alex Machuca	(Spain) UD Ibiza	Free	
25 July 2019	DF	(Spain) Hugo Díaz	(Spain) Getafe CF	Free	
1 August 2019	FW	(Montenegro) Oliver Sarkic	(England) Burton Albion	Free	
2 August 2019	GK	(Northern Ireland) Bailey Peacock-Farrell	(England) Burnley	£3,500,000	
5 August 2019	MF	(Japan) Yosuke Ideguchi	(Japan) Gamba Osaka	Undisclosed	
6 August 2019	FW	(England) Kemar Roofe	(Belgium) Anderlecht	£7,000,000	
8 August 2019	MF	(England) Clarke Oduor	(England) Barnsley	Undisclosed	
8 August 2019	DF	(England) Tom Pearce	(England) Wigan Athletic	£250,000	
2 September 2019	MF	(Netherlands) Vurnon Anita	(Bulgaria) CSKA Sofia	Free	
2 September 2019	MF	(England) Callum Nicell	(England) Farsley Celtic	Free	
10 January 2020	DF	(England) Lewie Coyle	(England) Fleetwood Town	Undisclosed	
12 January 2020	FW	(Sweden) Paweł Cibicki	(Poland) Pogoń Szczecin	Undisclosed	
13 January 2020	MF	(England) Connor Leak-Blunt	(England) Sheffield United	Free	

=== Loan in ===
Date from	Date to	Pos.	Name	From	Ref.
1 July 2019	30 June 2020	MF	(England) Jack Harrison	(England) Manchester City	
1 July 2019	30 June 2020	DF	(England) Ben White	(England) Brighton & Hove Albion	
2 July 2019	1 January 2020	FW	(England) Jack Clarke	(England) Tottenham Hotspur	
3 July 2019	30 June 2020	FW	(Portugal) Hélder Costa	(England) Wolverhampton Wanderers	
8 August 2019	30 June 2020	GK	(France) Illan Meslier	(France) Lorient	
8 August 2019	1 January 2020	FW	(England) Eddie Nketiah	(England) Arsenal	
27 January 2020	30 June 2020	FW	(France) Jean-Kévin Augustin	(Germany) RB Leipzig	

=== Loan out ===
Date from	Date to	Pos.	Name	To	Ref.
1 July 2019	30 June 2020	FW	(Netherlands) Jay-Roy Grot	(Netherlands) Vitesse	
5 July 2019	31 December 2019	DF	(England) Lewie Coyle	(England) Fleetwood Town	
14 July 2019	30 June 2020	FW	(Spain) Adrián Balboa	(Spain) Lorca FC	
21 August 2019	12 January 2020	FW	(Sweden) Paweł Cibicki	(Netherlands) ADO Den Haag	
23 August 2019	30 June 2020	FW	(Spain) Rafa Mújica	(Spain) Extremadura	
2 September 2019	13 January 2020	DF	(Belgium) Laurens De Bock	(England) Sunderland	
2 September 2019	13 January 2020	DF	(Republic of Ireland) Conor Shaughnessy	(England) Mansfield Town	
13 January 2020	30 June 2020	DF	(Belgium) Laurens De Bock	(Netherlands) ADO Den Haag	
13 January 2020	30 June 2020	DF	(Republic of Ireland) Conor Shaughnessy	(England) Burton Albion	
24 January 2020	30 June 2020	FW	(Spain) Rafa Mújica	(Spain) Villarreal	
30 January 2020	30 June 2020	MF	(Republic of Ireland) Eunan O'Kane	(England) Luton Town	
31 January 2020	30 June 2020	FW	(Bulgaria) Kun Temenuzhkov	(Spain) La Nucía	
