= Brooke Norton-Cuffy =

English footballer (born 2004)

- Norton-Cuffy in 2026

Personal information
- Full name: Brooke Dion Nelson Norton-Cuffy
- Date of birth: 12 January 2004 (age 22)
- Place of birth: Pimlico, England
- Height: 1.81 m (5 ft 11 in)
- Position: Right-back

Team information
- Current team: Hull City
- Number: 18

Youth career
- 2011–2014: Chelsea
- 2014–2021: Arsenal

Senior career*
Years	Team	Apps	(Gls)
2021–2024	Arsenal	0	(0)
2022	→ Lincoln City (loan)	17	(1)
2022–2023	→ Rotherham United (loan)	20	(0)
2023	→ Coventry City (loan)	21	(0)
2023–2024	→ Millwall (loan)	40	(2)
2024–2026	Genoa	43	(3)
2026–	Hull City	7	(0)

International career^{‡}
2019–2020	England U16	5	(1)
2021	England U18	3	(0)
2022	England U19	8	(0)
2023–2025	England U20	6	(0)
2023–	England U21	14	(0)
Medal record
Men's football
Representing England
UEFA European Under-21 Championship
Winner	2025 Slovakia
UEFA European Under-19 Championship
Winner	2022 Slovakia
- * Club domestic league appearances and goals as of 15:59, 22 November 2026 (UTC) ‡ National team caps and goals as of 13:17, 19 November 2025 (UTC)

Brooke Dion Nelson Norton-Cuffy (born 12 January 2004) is an English professional footballer who plays as a right-back for Premier League club Hull City.

== Club career ==
Norton-Cuffy began his career with Chelsea, before joining Arsenal at the age of 10, and signing his first professional contract on 21 January 2021. On 18 January 2022, joined Lincoln City on loan for the remainder of the season. He made his senior debut coming off the bench away to Plymouth Argyle on 22 January 2022. He scored his first senior goal against Sheffield Wednesday on 5 March 2022. He was Arsenal's Scholar of the Year for 2022.

On 22 August 2022, Norton-Cuffy joined Rotherham United on a season-long loan. In January 2023 Norton-Cuffy was recalled by Arsenal, and he moved to Coventry City on loan instead. On 24 August 2023, he joined Millwall on a season-long loan.

On 14 August 2024, Norton-Cuffy joined Serie A club Genoa for an undisclosed fee. He scored his first goal for the club in a 2–1 away win over Udinese on 8 December 2025.

On 1 September 2026, newly promoted Premier League club Hull City agreed a transfer with Genoa for Norton-Cuffy, with Cody Drameh moving in the opposite direction.

== International career ==
Born in England, Norton-Cuffy is of Dominica descent. Having already represented England at U16 and U18 level, he made his U19 debut during a 3–1 win over Republic of Ireland during 2022 UEFA European Under-19 Championship qualification at the Bescot Stadium.

On 17 June 2022, Norton-Cuffy was included in the England U19 squad for the 2022 UEFA European Under-19 Championship. He was a second-half substitute in the final as England beat Israel 3–1 in extra time to win the tournament.

On 22 March 2023, Norton-Cuffy made his debut for the England U20s during a 2–0 win over Germany in Manchester. On 10 May 2023, Norton-Cuffy was included in the England squad for the 2023 FIFA U-20 World Cup. However, he did not arrive at the tournament until after the group stages due to Coventry City's participation in the 2023 EFL Championship play-off final. His only appearance of the tournament saw him start in their round of sixteen defeat against Italy.

On 16 October 2023, Norton-Cuffy made his England U21 debut as a substitute during a 3–2 defeat to Ukraine in Košice in 2025 UEFA European Under-21 Championship qualifying.

== Career statistics ==
As of match played 22 November 2026

Appearances and goals by club, season and competition
Club	Season	League			National cup (Note: Includes FA Cup, Coppa Italia)		League cup (Note: Includes EFL Cup)		Other		Total	
Club	Season	Division	Apps	Goals	Apps	Goals	Apps	Goals	Apps	Goals	Apps	Goals
Arsenal U21	2020–21	—			—		—		1 (Note: Appearance(s) in EFL Trophy)	0	1	0
Arsenal U21	2021–22	—			—		—		3	0	3	0
Arsenal U21	Total		—		—		—		4	0	4	0
Arsenal	2021–22	Premier League	0	0	0	0	0	0	—		0	0
Arsenal	2022–23	Premier League	0	0	—		—		—		0	0
Arsenal	2023–24	Premier League	0	0	—		—		—		0	0
Arsenal	Total		0	0	0	0	0	0	—		0	0
Lincoln City (loan)	2021–22	League One	17	1	—		—		—		17	1
Rotherham United (loan)	2022–23	Championship	20	0	—		1	0	—		21	0
Coventry City (loan)	2022–23	Championship	21	0	0	0	—		3 (Note: Appearances in Championship play-offs)	0	24	0
Millwall (loan)	2023–24	Championship	40	2	0	0	—		—		40	2
Genoa	2024–25	Serie A	14	0	0	0	—		—		14	0
Genoa	2025–26	Serie A	27	2	2	0	—		—		29	2
Genoa	2026–27	Serie A	2	1	1	0	—		—		3	1
Genoa	Total		43	3	3	0	—		—		46	3
Hull City	2026–27	Premier League	7	0	0	0	0	0	—		7	0
Career total			148	6	3	0	1	0	7	0	159	6

== Honours ==
England U19

- UEFA European Under-19 Championship: 2022

England U21

- UEFA European Under-21 Championship: 2025
