= George Honeyman =

English footballer (born 1994)

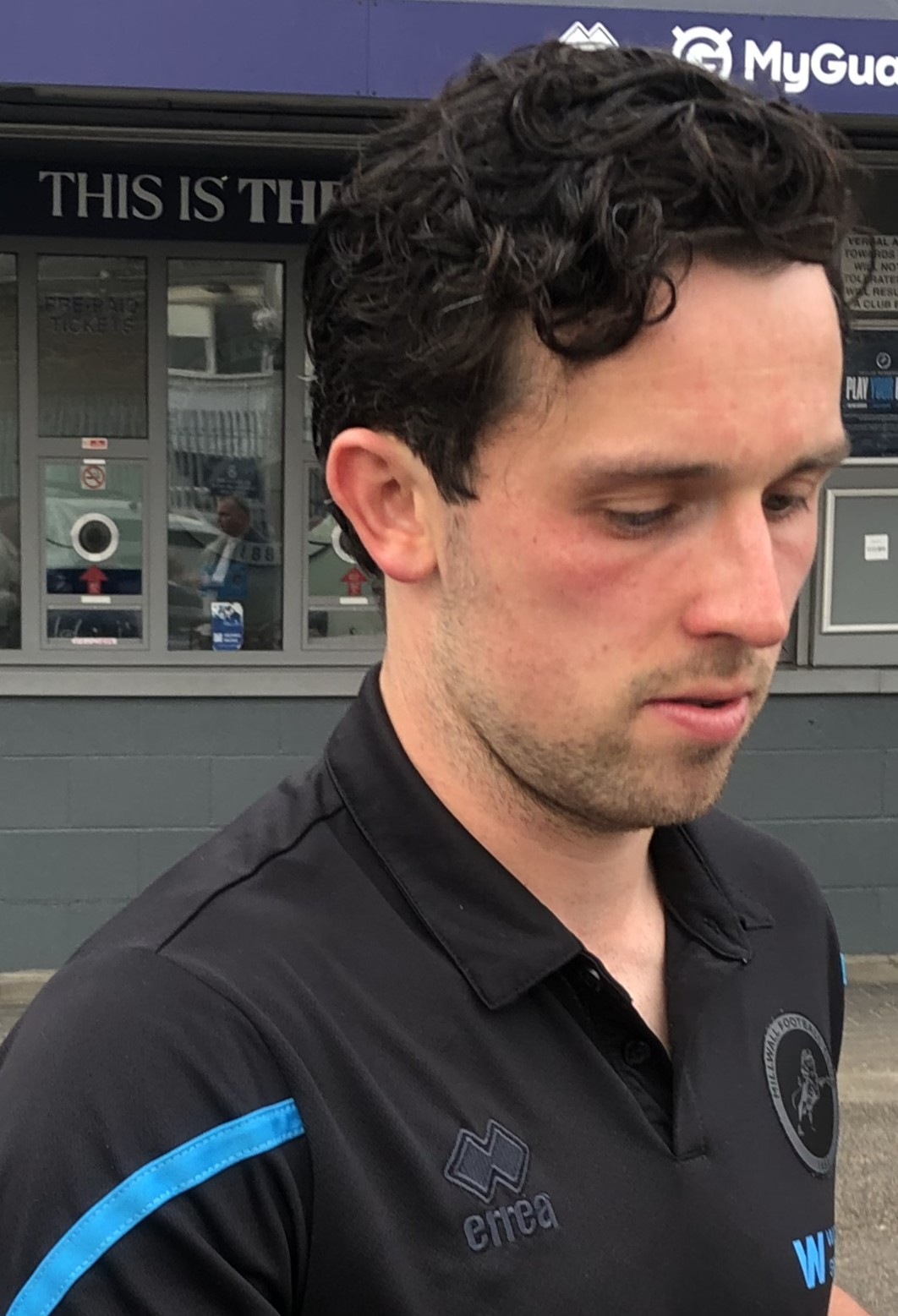
- Honeyman in 2025

Personal information
- Full name: George Christopher Honeyman
- Date of birth: 8 September 1994 (age 32)
- Place of birth: Prudhoe, England
- Height: 5 ft 8 in (1.73 m)
- Position: Midfielder

Team information
- Current team: Blackpool
- Number: 10

Youth career
- 2004–2015: Sunderland

Senior career*
Years	Team	Apps	(Gls)
2015–2019	Sunderland	83	(12)
2015–2016	→ Gateshead (loan)	9	(1)
2019–2022	Hull City	119	(10)
2022–2025	Millwall	109	(3)
2025–	Blackpool	33	(2)
- * Club domestic league appearances and goals as of 22:53, 12 May 2026 (UTC)

George Christopher Honeyman (born 8 September 1994) is an English professional footballer who plays as a midfielder for Blackpool.

A product of Sunderland's youth academy, Honeyman made his professional debut in February 2015. He had a brief spell on loan with Gateshead during the 2015–16 season before returning and assuming the captaincy in 2018. He joined Hull City a year later.

== Career ==
=== Sunderland ===
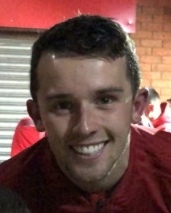
Honeyman in 2018.

Born in Prudhoe, Northumberland, Honeyman joined Sunderland's academy in 2004 at the age of 10. He made his first-team debut on 15 February 2015 in the fifth round of the FA Cup, replacing Ricky Álvarez for the final four minutes of a 2–0 away loss to Bradford City. Manager Gus Poyet admitted that Honeyman would have been put on earlier had the team not had injury concerns, admitting that "George would have been coming on earlier because we needed a bit of his running between the lines and ability to make runs". He was included in the matchday squad for one Premier League match that season, remaining unused in a 1–1 draw to Stoke City.

On 16 October 2015, Honeyman was loaned to National League club Gateshead for a month, as fellow Sunderland youngster Lynden Gooch had done the previous season. He made his league debut the following day, starting in a 2–2 home draw against Altrincham. On 31 October, he netted the first goal of his career, the winner in a 3–2 win away to Boreham Wood.

He scored his first goal for Sunderland in a 1–0 EFL Cup first round win to Bury on 10 August 2017. Six days later, he scored his first league goal to open a 1–1 draw away to Sheffield Wednesday. In August 2018, as Sunderland prepared for the League One season following a second successive relegation, Honeyman was appointed captain at the age of 23 by new manager Jack Ross, as John O'Shea left for Reading. He became the first academy-produced player to be club captain since Michael Gray.

=== Hull City ===
Honeyman signed for Championship club Hull City on 2 August 2019 on a three-year contract with the option of a further year for an undisclosed fee — ending his 15-year association with Sunderland. He made his debut on 10 August when he came on as a 79th-minute substitute in a 2–1 home win against Reading.

In April 2021 he was nominated for the EFL League One Player of the Season, and on 29 April 2021 was named in the 2020–21 EFL League One Team of the Season at the league's annual awards ceremony.

On 18 May 2022, Hull City exercised an option for an additional year on his contract.

=== Millwall ===
On 28 June 2022, Honeyman joined Millwall for an undisclosed fee, signing a long-term contract with the club.

=== Blackpool ===
Honeyman signed a two-year contract with Blackpool in June 2025.

== Career statistics ==
As of end of 2025–26 season

Appearances and goals by club, season and competition
Club	Season	League			FA Cup		EFL Cup		Other		Total	
Club	Season	Division	Apps	Goals	Apps	Goals	Apps	Goals	Apps	Goals	Apps	Goals
Sunderland	2014–15	Premier League	0	0	1	0	0	0	—		1	0
Sunderland	2015–16	Premier League	1	0	0	0	0	0	—		1	0
Sunderland	2016–17	Premier League	5	0	1	0	0	0	—		6	0
Sunderland	2017–18	Championship	42	6	1	0	2	1	—		45	7
Sunderland	2018–19	League One	35	6	2	1	1	0	6 (Note: Three appearances and one goal in EFL Trophy, three appearances in League One play-offs)	1	44	8
Sunderland	Total		83	12	5	1	3	1	6	1	97	15
Gateshead (loan)	2015–16	National League	9	1	0	0	—		1 (Note: Appearance in FA Trophy)	0	10	1
Sunderland U23	2016–17	—			—		—		4 (Note: Appearance(s) in EFL Trophy)	0	4	0
Hull City	2019–20	Championship	42	1	1	0	1	0	—		44	1
Hull City	2020–21	League One	42	4	1	0	3	0	1	0	47	4
Hull City	2021–22	Championship	35	5	1	0	0	0	—		36	5
Hull City	Total		119	10	3	0	4	0	1	0	127	10
Millwall	2022–23	Championship	38	1	1	0	1	0	—		40	1
Millwall	2023–24	Championship	31	0	1	0	0	0	—		31	0
Millwall	2024–25	Championship	40	2	3	0	2	0	—		45	2
Millwall	Total		109	3	5	0	3	0	—		116	3
Blackpool	2025–26	League One	33	2	3	0	1	0	0	0	37	2
Career total			353	28	16	1	11	1	12	1	449	31

== Honours ==
Sunderland

- EFL Trophy runner-up: 2018–19

Hull City

- EFL League One: 2020–21

Individual

- PFA Team of the Year: 2020–21 League One
- EFL League One Team of the Season: 2020–21
- Hull City Player of the Year: 2020–21
- Hull City Players' Player of the Year: 2020–21
- Hull City Supporters' Player of the Year: 2020–21
