= 2023–24 Professional U21 Development League =

Premier League 2
- Season: 2023–24
- Champions: Tottenham Hotspur U21s (1st Title)
- Regular Season Champions: Tottenham Hotspur U21s (2nd Title)
- Matches: 275
- Goals: 1,104 (4.01 per match) (1026 RS, 78 PO)
- Best player: (England) Will Lankshear Tottenham Hotspur U21s
- Top goalscorer: (England) Will Lankshear Tottenham Hotspur U21s (18 Goals) (5 playoffs) (23 Total Goals)
- Biggest home win: Manchester United U21s 10–1 Stoke City U21s (26 August 2023)
- Biggest away win: Leeds United U21s 1–7 Crystal Palace U21s (3 November 2023); Manchester City U21s 0–6 Norwich City U21s (17 December 2023); Newcastle United U21s 1–7 Chelsea U21s (8 March 2024)
- Highest scoring: Manchester United U21s 10-1 Stoke City U21s (26 August 2023)
- Longest winning run: 11 Matches Tottenham Hotspur U21s August 12, 2023–January 27, 2024
- Longest unbeaten run: 12 Matches Tottenham Hotspur U21s; 12 August 2023–17 February 2024
- Longest winless run: 12 Matches Leeds United U21s; 22 September 2023–8 April 2024
- Longest losing run: 5 Matches Leeds United U21s; 19 February 2024-8 April 2024
- Highest attendance: 4,182 Tottenham Hotspur U21s 3–1 Sunderland U21s (26 May 2024)
- Lowest attendance: 32 Reading U21s 3–0 Manchester City U21s (26 April 2024)
- All statistics correct as of 20 March 2024.

The 2023–24 Professional U21 Development League was the 12th season of the Professional Development League system.

The Premier League 2 changed format for 2023–24 with one division instead of two.

Reading regained Category One status in the summer.

== Premier League 2 ==
=== Table ===
Pos	Team	Pld	W	D	L	GF	GA	GD	Pts	
1	Tottenham Hotspur U21s (R, C)	20	14	4	2	54	28	+26	46	Qualification to the Elimination Playoffs and Premier League International Cup
2	West Ham United U21s	20	13	3	4	53	29	+24	42	Qualification to the Elimination Playoffs and Premier League International Cup
3	Fulham U21s	20	11	5	4	52	30	+22	38	Qualification to the Elimination Playoffs and Premier League International Cup
4	Chelsea U21s	20	11	3	6	53	32	+21	36	Qualification to the Elimination Playoffs and Premier League International Cup
5	Arsenal U21s	20	10	6	4	47	33	+14	36	Qualification to the Elimination Playoffs and Premier League International Cup
6	Reading U21s	20	10	5	5	35	35	0	35	Qualification to the Elimination Playoffs and Premier League International Cup
7	Sunderland U21s	20	10	4	6	45	32	+13	34	Qualification to the Elimination Playoffs and Premier League International Cup
8	Liverpool U21s	20	10	3	7	34	27	+7	33	Qualification to the Elimination Playoffs and Premier League International Cup
9	Crystal Palace U21s	20	9	4	7	49	42	+7	31	Qualification to the Elimination Playoffs and Premier League International Cup
10	Wolverhampton Wanderers U21s	20	9	4	7	39	36	+3	31	Qualification to the Elimination Playoffs and Premier League International Cup
11	Middlesbrough U21s	20	9	4	7	38	39	−1	31	Qualification to the Elimination Playoffs and Premier League International Cup
12	Manchester United U21s	20	8	5	7	56	43	+13	29	Qualification to the Elimination Playoffs and Premier League International Cup
13	Brighton & Hove Albion U21s	20	8	5	7	35	38	−3	29	Qualification to the Elimination Playoffs
14	Nottingham Forest U21s	20	7	7	6	30	33	−3	28	Qualification to the Elimination Playoffs
15	Blackburn Rovers U21s	20	8	3	9	41	58	−17	27	Qualification to the Elimination Playoffs
16	Aston Villa U21s	20	7	4	9	40	48	−8	25	Qualification to the Elimination Playoffs
17	Southampton U21s	20	7	3	10	43	47	−4	24	
18	Norwich City U21s	20	7	2	11	43	42	+1	23	
19	Stoke City U21s	20	7	2	11	38	55	−17	23	
20	Leicester City U21s	20	5	5	10	33	41	−8	20	
21	West Bromwich Albion U21s	20	5	4	11	24	36	−12	19	
22	Newcastle United U21s	20	5	4	11	29	46	−17	19	
23	Manchester City U21s	20	4	6	10	32	50	−18	18	
24	Leeds United U21s	20	5	3	12	28	48	−20	18	
25	Everton U21s	20	4	5	11	25	40	−15	17	
26	Derby County U21s	20	5	1	14	30	38	−8	16	

Source: Premier League 2 Table
(C) Champions; (R) Regular Season Champions

=== Results ===
Home \ Away	ARS	AVL	BLB	BHA	CHE	CRY	DER	EVE	FUL	LEE	LEI	LIV	MNC	MNU	MID	NEW	NOR	NFO	REA	SOU	STK	SUN	TOT	WBA	WHU	WOL
Arsenal U21	—	3–5	—	6–3	—	—	—	—	—	1–1	4–1	—	3–3	—	1–0	—	—	—	3–0	4–2	—	—	1–1	—	3–0	—
Aston Villa U21	—	—	—	—	0–4	—	3–1	2–1	1–1	—	2–2	—	—	—	4–0	—	1–4	—	—	—	2–2 (Note: Originally scheduled to be played on 1 December 2023, the Aston Villa match against Stoke City was postponed due to a frozen pitch.)	2–3	—	0–3	—	—
Blackburn Rovers U21	2–2	2–3	—	—	—	3–3	—	—	—	—	4–1	1–0	—	2–5	—	2–1	—	—	—	—	3–6	0–4	—	—	1–3	—
Brighton & Hove Albion U21	—	2–1	—	—	—	—	—	—	—	2–4	0–0	4–2	—	—	—	1–1	2–0	1–0	0–3	—	—	—	—	2–1	1–4	—
Chelsea U21	2–4	—	6–1	2–3	—	—	—	—	2–2	—	1–1	—	—	3–2	—	—	—	2–3	3–2	2–0	—	—	—	3–0	—	—
Crystal Palace U21	—	4–2	—	2–1	2–2	—	—	0–0	2–5	—	—	2–4	—	3–2	—	—	—	—	—	—	—	—	5–0 (Note: Originally scheduled to be played on 9 February 2024 and then 29 March 2024, the Crystal Palace matches against Tottenham Hotspur were both postponed due to a waterlogged pitch.)	3–0	1–5	—
Derby County U21	—	—	1–3	2–3	—	—	—	3–0	—	—	—	1–1	4–2	—	—	—	—	0–1	5–1	—	1–2	—	0–2	—	—	1–2
Everton U21	1–1	—	2–3	0–4	—	—	—	—	—	—	4–3	—	1–1	—	—	—	2–1	1–2	—	5–0	—	—	—	1–3	—	0–2
Fulham U21	—	—	1–2	3–0	—	—	2–1	—	—	—	1–3	—	2–1	1–1	2–2	—	—	—	7–1	5–1	—	—	0–2	—	—	—
Leeds United U21	—	—	—	—	0–2	1–7	3–0	1–1 (Note: Originally scheduled to be played on 15 January 2024, the Leeds United match against Everton was postponed due to a frozen pitch.)	3–5	—	—	2–2	—	—	—	—	0–2	—	—	—	2–1	1–3	—	—	2–5	—
Leicester City U21	—	—	—	—	—	1–1 (Note: The match between Leicester City and Crystal Palace was abandoned after 86 minutes due to an injury to Crystal Palace player Joe Sheridan. The Premier League confirmed that the result will stand.)	2–1	—	—	2–0	—	—	1–3	—	1–3	2–2 (Note: On 3 November, the Leicester City match against Newcastle United was abandoned with the score at 2–2.)	2–3	—	—	1–2	3–0	—	—	—	—	1–3
Liverpool U21	0–2	0–2	—	—	2–1	—	—	4–0	2–0	—	—	—	2–0	—	1–4	—	—	—	—	—	3–1	—	—	—	0–4	2–0
Manchester City U21	—	4–4	—	—	1–2	0–3	—	—	—	—	—	—	—	—	—	—	0–6	2–0	—	—	—	2–2	0–5	2–0	2–2	3–3
Manchester United U21	2–4	—	—	1–1	—	—	2–4	3–1	—	1–2	—	0–3	2–1	—	—	3–2	4–2	—	—	—	10–1	—	—	—	—	—
Middlesbrough U21	—	—	—	—	1–3	2–3	1–0	2–2	—	—	—	—	—	3–2	—	3–2 (Note: Originally scheduled to be played on 9 February 2024, the Middlesbrough match against Newcastle United was postponed due to a waterlogged pitch.)	—	—	—	—	4–1	—	1–2	0–1	—	3–2
Newcastle United U21	—	0–1 (Note: Originally scheduled to be played on 15 January 2024, the Newcastle United match against Aston Villa was postponed due to a frozen pitch.)	—	—	1–7	—	—	1–0	1–3	0–2	—	1–2	0–4	—	—	—	—	1–1	—	5–3	—	—	—	3–2	—	—
Norwich City U21	—	—	4–0	—	3–2	—	—	—	3–3	—	—	—	—	—	2–3	—	—	2–2	—	0–2	—	—	3–4	2–1	0–2	3–4
Nottingham Forest U21	2–0	3–0	1–5	—	—	4–3	—	—	—	4–0	—	—	—	0–0	2–2	—	—	—	0–0 (Note: Originally scheduled to be played on 9 February 2024, the Nottingham Forest match against Reading was postponed. The rescheduled game on 22 April 2024 was abandoned after an injury to Nottingham Forest player Ben Perry.)	—	—	0–5	—	—	—	2–2
Reading U21s	—	—	7–2	—	—	2–0	—	—	—	3–2	2–1	0–0	3–0	—	2–2	1–0	2–1	—	—	—	—	2–1	—	—	—	—
Southampton U21	—	4–2	—	—	—	4–0	2–1	—	—	—	—	0–3	—	3–6 (Note: Originally scheduled to be played on 9 February 2024, the Southampton match against Manchester United was postponed due to a waterlogged pitch.)	—	—	—	1–1	6–0	—	5–1	1–2	2–3	—	—	—
Stoke City U21	2–2	—	—	4–3	—	1–3	—	—	—	—	—	—	5–1	—	—	1–2	4–2	3–1	0–2	—	—	—	0–2	—	—	2–1
Sunderland U21	1–2	—	—	1–1	—	—	3–1	—	—	—	4–2 (Note: Originally scheduled to be played on 9 February 2024, the Sunderland match against Leicester City was postponed due to a waterlogged pitch.)	2–1	—	5–5	1–2	2–3	2–0	—	—	—	—	—	2–4	—	—	—
Tottenham Hotspur U21	—	5–3	4–0	—	4–2	—	—	1–2	—	1–0	—	—	—	2–2 (Note: Originally scheduled to be played on 2 December 2023, the Tottenham Hotspur match against Manchester United was postponed due to a frozen pitch.)	—	4–1	—	—	2–2	—	—	—	—	—	1–1	5–1
West Bromwich Albion U21	3–0 (Note: Originally scheduled to be played on 1 December 2023, the West Bromwich Albion match against Arsenal was postponed due to a frozen pitch.)	—	3–3	—	—	—	0–1	—	0–3	4–2	—	—	—	0–3	—	—	—	—	0–0	1–1	—	0–0	—	—	2–4	—
West Ham United U21	—	—	—	—	0–2	—	3–2	3–1	0–3	—	1–3	—	—	—	5–0	—	—	3–1	—	3–3	3–1	2–0	—	—	—	—
Wolverhampton Wanderers U21	2–1	—	1–2	1–1	—	3–2	—	—	2–3	2–0	—	—	—	—	—	2–2	—	—	—	2–1	—	1–2	—	3–0	—	—

Source: Premier League 2 Results
Legend: Blue = home team win; Yellow = draw; Red = away team win.

=== Elimination Playoffs ===
Round of 16
1	Tottenham Hotspur U21s	4
16	Aston Villa U21s	3
8	Liverpool U21s	3
9	Crystal Palace U21s	2
5	Arsenal U21s	6
12	Manchester United U21s	2
4	Chelsea U21s	5
13	Brighton & Hove Albion U21s	4
6	Reading U21s	2
11	Middlesbrough U21s	0
3	Fulham U21s	0
14	Nottingham Forest U21s	2
7	Sunderland U21s	4
10	Wolverhampton Wanderers U21s	1
2	West Ham United U21s	4
15	Blackburn Rovers U21s	1

Quarter-finals
1	Tottenham Hotspur U21s	3 (5)
8	Liverpool U21s	3 (4)
5	Arsenal U21s	2
4	Chelsea U21s	3
6	Reading U21s	3
14	Nottingham Forest U21s	1
7	Sunderland U21s	3 (5)
2	West Ham United U21s	3 (3)

Semi-finals
1	Tottenham Hotspur U21s	2
4	Chelsea U21s	1
6	Reading U21s	3
7	Sunderland U21s	4

Final
1	Tottenham Hotspur U21s	3
7	Sunderland U21s	1

==== Round of 16 ====
3 May 2024
13:00 BST

Arsenal U21s	6–2	Manchester United U21s
Butler-Oyedeji 14', 42'; Henry-Francis 27'; Cozier-Duberry 30', 90+1'; Nwaneri 54' (pen.)	Report	Mather 66'; Biancheri 90+6'

Meadow Park, Borehamwood
Attendance: 610
Referee: Aaron Farmer

3 May 2024
13:00 BST

Chelsea U21s	5–4 (a.e.t.)	Brighton & Hove Albion U21s
Moreira 22'; Richards 41', 60'; Morgan 105+2'; Silcott-Duberry 116'	Report	Baker-Boaitey 34'; Duffus 72', 105+4'; Kavanagh 85'

Kingsmeadow, Kingston-Upon-Thames
Attendance: 389
Referee: Stephen Parkinson

3 May 2024
13:00 BST

West Ham United U21s	4–1	Blackburn Rovers U21s
Moore 43'; Powell 76' (o.g.); Earthy 79'; Marshall 88'	Report	Batty 80'

Rush Green Stadium, Romford
Attendance: 196
Referee: Aji Ajibola

4 May 2024
12:00 BST

Reading U21s	2–0	Middlesbrough U21s
Akande 68', 74'	Report

Madjeski Stadium, Reading
Attendance: 841
Referee: Gary Parsons

5 May 2024
13:00 BST

Liverpool U21s	3–2	Crystal Palace U21s
Gordon 57', 59'; Nyoni 61'	Report	Mathurin 36' (pen.); Watson 44'

Liverpool Academy, Kirkby
Attendance: 178
Referee: Dean Watson

6 May 2024
12:00 BST

Tottenham Hotspur U21s	4–3 (a.e.t.)	Aston Villa U21s
Santiago 71'; Lankshear 75', 100'; Kyerematen 90+1'	Report	Swinkels 32'; Jimoh 83', 90+3'

Broadhall Way, Stevenage
Attendance: 601
Referee: Robert Massey-Ellis

6 May 2024
14:00 BST

Sunderland U21s	4–1	Wolverhampton Wanderers U21s
Middlemas 57'; Samuel-Ogunsuyi 79'; Watson 86'; Tutierov 90+4'	Report	Fraser 45+2'

Eppleton Colliery Welfare Ground, Hetton-le-Hole
Attendance: 534
Referee: Benjamin Wyatt

6 May 2024
19:00 BST

Fulham U21s	0–2	Nottingham Forest U21s
	Report	Esapa Osong 17'; Konaté 90+4'

Motspur Park, New Malden
Attendance: 116
Referee: Alan Dale

==== Quarterfinals ====
11 May 2024
13:00 BST

Arsenal U21s	2–3	Chelsea U21s
Lewis-Skelly 13'; Butler-Oyedeji 55'	Report	Diego Moreira 45+2', 80', 90+5'

Meadow Park, Borehamwood
Attendance: 500
Referee: Paul Johnson

11 May 2024
14:00 BST

Reading U21s	3–1	Nottingham Forest U21s
Wareham 8' (pen.); Clarke 33', 67'	Report	Esapa Osong 38'

Madjeski Stadium, Reading
Attendance: 1,161
Referee: Jason Richardson

12 May 2024
19:00 BST

Tottenham Hotspur U21s	3–3 (a.e.t.)	Liverpool U21s
Donley 26'; Hall 36', 47'	Report	Koumas 11'; Dorrington 72' (o.g.); Norris 82'
Penalties
John (penalty scored); Lankshear (penalty scored); Hall (penalty scored); Abbott (penalty scored); Soonsup-Bell (penalty scored)	5–4	(penalty scored) Koumas; (penalty scored) Pilling; (penalty missed) Norris; (penalty scored) Davidson; (penalty scored) Morrison

Tottenham Hotspur Stadium, Tottenham
Attendance: 1,180
Referee: Ruebyn Ricardo

13 May 2024
19:00 BST

Sunderland U21s	3–3 (a.e.t.)	West Ham United U21s
Taylor 84'; Kelly 111'; Watson 119'	Report	Kodua 41'; Kelly 105+5'; Marshall 117'
Penalties
Taylor (penalty scored); Jones (penalty scored); Kelly (penalty scored); Middlemas (penalty scored); Watson (penalty scored)	5–3	(penalty scored) Orford; (penalty scored) Marshall; (penalty scored) Kelly; (penalty missed) Forson

Eppleton Colliery Welfare Ground, Hetton-le-Hole
Attendance: 831
Referee: Aaron Bannister

==== Semifinals ====
19 May 2024
12:00 BST

Tottenham Hotspur U21s	2–1	Chelsea U21s
Lankshear 15'; John 90+4'	Report	Washington 76'

Tottenham Hotspur Stadium, London
Attendance: 1,123
Referee: Richie Watkins

20 May 2024
19:00 BST

Reading U21s	3–4 (a.e.t.)	Sunderland U21s
Wareham 25'; Akande 75'; Carson 78'	Report	Taylor 11', 33', 90+9'; Samuel-Ogunsuyi 120+1'

Madjeski Stadium, Reading
Attendance: 2,374
Referee: Andrew Humphries

==== Final ====
26 May 2024
15:00

Tottenham Hotspur U21s	3–1	Sunderland U21s
Lankshear 39', 61'; Abbott 90+4'	Report	Tutierov 90+7'

Tottenham Hotspur Stadium, London
Attendance: 4,182
Referee: Gareth Rhodes

=== Top goalscorers ===
As of 26 May 2024

Rank	Player	Club	Goals
1	(England) Will Lankshear	Tottenham Hotspur U21s	23
2	(Northern Ireland) Callum Marshall	West Ham United U21s	18
3	(England) Kenneth Aboh	Norwich City U21s	11
3	(England) Amario Cozier-Duberry	Arsenal U21s	11
3	(England) Ethan Nwaneri	Arsenal U21s	11
3	(England) Ronnie Stutter	Chelsea U21s	11
7	(Spain) Yago Alonso	Tottenham Hotspur U21s	10
7	(England) Leo Castledine	Chelsea U21s	10
7	(England) George Earthy	West Ham United U21s	10
7	(Republic of Ireland) Mark O'Mahony	Brighton & Hove Albion U21s	10
7	(Thailand) Jude Soonsup-Bell	Tottenham Hotspur U21s	10
7	(England) Jayden Wareham	Reading U21s	10
13	(Wales) Lewis Koumas	Liverpool U21s	9
13	(England) Kobei Moore	Aston Villa U21s	9
13	(England) Ellis Taylor	Sunderland U21s	9

=== Hat-tricks ===
As of 26 May 2024

Player	For	Against	Result	Date	Ref.
(England) Luca Thomas	Leeds United U21s	Brighton & Hove Albion U21s	2–4 (A)	11 August 2023	
(England) Dominic Ballard	Southampton U21s	Newcastle United U21s	5–3 (A)	13 August 2023	
(England) Dominic Ballard	Southampton U21s	Aston Villa U21s	4–2 (H)	18 August 2023	
(England) Ethan Nwaneri	Arsenal U21s	Leicester City U21s	4–1 (H)	18 August 2023	
(Northern Ireland) Callum Marshall	West Ham United U21s	Leeds United U21s	2–5 (A)	26 August 2023	
(Northern Ireland) Callum Marshall	West Ham United U21s	Middlesbrough U21s	5–0 (H)	27 October 2023	
(England) Ademola Ola-Adebomi	Crystal Palace U21s	Manchester City U21s	1–7 (A)	3 November 2023	
(Germany) Semir Telalovic	Blackburn Rovers U21s	Stoke City U21s	3–6 (H)	5 November 2023	
(England) Francis Okoronkwo	Everton U21s	Southampton U21s	5–0 (H)	4 December 2023	
(England) Nathan Lowe	Stoke City U21s	Manchester City U21s	5–1 (H)	15 January 2024	
(England) Jimmy-Jay Morgan	Chelsea U21s	Reading U21s	5–1 (H)	27 January 2024	
(England) Will Lankshear	Tottenham Hotspur U21s	Aston Villa U21s	5–3 (H)	27 January 2024	
(England) Sam Mather^{4}	Manchester United U21s	Norwich City U21s	4–2 (H)	27 January 2024	
(Albania) Adrion Pajaziti	Fulham U21s	Reading U21s	7–1 (H)	1 March 2024	
(England) Luke Plange	Crystal Palace U21s	Aston Villa U21s	4–2 (H)	11 March 2024	
(England) Errol Mundle-Smith	Norwich City U21s	Aston Villa U21s	1–4 (A)	26 April 2024	
(Ghana) Jesurun Rak-Sakyi	Crystal Palace U21s	Tottenham Hotspur U21s	5–0 (H)	29 April 2024	
(Belgium) Diego Moreira	Chelsea U21s	Arsenal U21s	2–3 (A)	11 May 2024	
(England) Ellis Taylor	Sunderland U21s	Reading U21s	3–4 (A)	20 May 2024	

Note

(H) – Home; (A) – Away
^{4} – player scored 4 goals

=== Awards ===
Player of the season: (England) Will Lankshear (Tottenham Hotspur U21s)

=== Player of the Month ===
Month	Player	Club	Ref.
August	(Ivory Coast) Martial Godo	Fulham U21s	
September	(Northern Ireland) Callum Marshall	West Ham United U21s	
October	(Northern Ireland) Jamie Donley	Tottenham Hotspur U21s	
November	(England) Ademola Ola-Adebomi	Crystal Palace U21s	
December	(Northern Ireland) Callum Marshall	West Ham United U21s	
January	(England) Will Lankshear	Tottenham Hotspur U21s	
February	(England) Jayden Danns	Liverpool U21s	
March	(Albania) Adrion Pajaziti	Fulham U21s	
April	(England) Amario Cozier-Duberry	Arsenal U21s	

== Professional Development League ==
U21 Professional Development League
- Season: 2023–24
- Champions: Sheffield United U21s (1st Title)
- Regular Season Champions: Sheffield United U21s (2nd Title)
- Matches: 313 (310 RS, 3 PO)
- Goals: 1,200 (3.83 per match) (1189 RS, 11 PO)
- Top goalscorer: (Ghana) Daniel Adu-Adjei AFC Bournemouth U21s, (Republic of Ireland) Patrick Casey Charlton Athletic U21s (18 Goals Each)
- Biggest home win: Millwall U21s 7–0 Watford U21s (March 11, 2024), Queens Park Rangers U21s 7–0 Crewe Alexandra U21s (April 9, 2024)
- Biggest away win: Ipswich Town U21s 1–8 Charlton Athletic U21s (February 13, 2024)
- Highest scoring: Fleetwood Town U21s 4–6 Crewe Alexandra U21s (September 26, 2023), Charlton Athletic U21s 5–5 Cardiff City U21s (November 27, 2023), Ipswich Town U21s 7–3 Swansea City U21s (February 20, 2024)
- Longest winning run: 6 Matches Hull City U21s (26 March 2024 – 19 April 2024); Sheffield Wednesday U21s (4 March 2024 – 19 April 2024)
- Longest unbeaten run: 10 Matches Birmingham City U21s (16 October 2023 – 15 January 2024)
- Longest winless run: 14 Matches Colchester United U21s (28 August 2023 – 22 February 2024)
- Longest losing run: 11 Matches Colchester United U21s (28 August 2023 – 26 January 2024)

The Professional Development League 2 is Under-21 football's second tier, designed for those academies with Category 2 status. The league is split regionally into north and south divisions, with each team facing opponents in their own region twice both home and away and opponents in the other region once resulting in 30 games played for the North Division, while the south division played 29 games. The sides finishing in the top two positions in both regions at the end of the season will progress to a knockout stage to determine the overall league champion. Millwall are the defending champions.

21 Teams competed in the league this season, one more team than the previous season. Reading U21s regained Category One status in the summer leaving the league after one solitary season. Meanwhile, AFC Bournemouth U21s, and Fleetwood Town U21s join the league for the very first time as both Academies reaches Category Two status for the 2023–24 season.

=== Tables ===
==== North Division ====
Pos	Team	Pld	W	D	L	GF	GA	GD	Pts	Qualification
1	Sheffield United U21s	30	19	6	5	83	34	+49	63	Qualification for Knock-out stage
2	Birmingham City U21s	30	15	10	5	59	36	+23	55	Qualification for Knock-out stage
3	Sheffield Wednesday U21s	30	16	6	8	58	34	+24	54	
4	Barnsley U21s	30	17	3	10	65	44	+21	54	
5	Hull City U21s	30	14	3	13	59	63	−4	45	
6	Burnley U21s	30	12	6	12	53	57	−4	42	
7	Fleetwood Town U21s	30	13	3	14	48	58	−10	42	
8	Peterborough United U21s	30	7	6	17	47	73	−26	27	
9	Wigan Athletic U21s	30	7	5	18	44	66	−22	26	
10	Coventry City U21s	30	7	5	18	41	67	−26	26	
11	Crewe Alexandra U21s	30	5	4	21	37	90	−53	19	

Source: Professional Development League table

==== South Division ====
Pos	Team	Pld	W	D	L	GF	GA	GD	Pts	Qualification
1	Millwall U21s	29	17	8	4	80	45	+35	59	Qualification for Knock-out stage
2	Swansea City U21s	29	16	3	10	72	49	+23	51	Qualification for Knock-out stage
3	AFC Bournemouth U21s	29	16	3	10	60	45	+15	51	
4	Queens Park Rangers U21s	29	14	7	8	66	43	+23	49	
5	Ipswich Town U21s	29	14	4	11	63	59	+4	46	
6	Watford U21s	29	10	7	12	45	66	−21	37	
7	Bristol City U21s	29	10	5	14	43	63	−20	35	
8	Charlton Athletic U21s	29	9	4	16	63	64	−1	31	
9	Cardiff City U21s	29	7	10	12	55	66	−11	31	
10	Colchester United U21s	29	9	4	16	48	67	−19	31	

Source: Professional Development League table

=== Knock-out stage ===
Semi-finals

17 May 2024
19:00

Millwall U21s	1–2 (a.e.t.)	Birmingham City U21s
Abdulmalik 22'	Report	Dixon 45', 115'

The Den, Bermondsey

20 May 2024
19:00

Sheffield United U21s	4–2	Swansea City U21s
Marsh 11'; Tinsdale 34'; Aston 48'; Tahir 61'	Report	Nzingo 43'; Woodward 83'

Brammall Lane, Sheffield

Professional Development League National Final

24 May 2024
19:00

Sheffield United U21s	2–0	Birmingham City U21s
Hampson 5'; Aston 76'

Brammall Lane, Sheffield
Attendance: 1,500
Referee: Niall Smith

=== Top goalscorers ===
As of 24 May 2024

Rank	Player	Club	Goals
1	(Ghana) Daniel Adu-Adjei	AFC Bournemouth U21s	18
1	(Republic of Ireland) Patrick Casey	Charlton Athletic U21s	18
3	(England) Abdul Abdulmalik	Millwall U21s	16
3	(England) Junior Dixon	Birmingham City U21s	16
3	(England) Louie Marsh	Sheffield United U21s	16
3	(England) Kyrell Wilson	Swansea City U21s	16
7	(England) Aiden Marsh	Barnsley U21s	14
7	(England) Tyrell Sellars-Fleming	Hull City U21s	14
9	(Scotland) Ryan Oné	Hull City U21s	13
10	(Republic of Ireland) Leon Ayinde	Ipswich Town U21s	12
10	(England) Tom Leahy	Millwall U21s	12
12	(Jamaica) Bailey Cadamarteri	Sheffield Wednesday U21s	11
12	(Portugal) Fabio Jalo	Barnsley U21s	11

=== Hat-tricks ===
As of 24 May 2024

Player	For	Against	Result	Date	Ref.
(England) Aiden Marsh	Barnsley U21s	Swansea City U21s	4–2 (H)	15 August 2023	
(England) Louie Marsh	Sheffield United U21s	Ipswich Town U21s	6–0 (H)	15 August 2023	
(Albania) Steven Bala	Queens Park Rangers U21s	Coventry City U21s	4–2 (H)	21 August 2023	
(England) Louie Marsh	Sheffield United U21s	Bristol City U21s	0–4 (A)	22 August 2023	
(England) Joe Westley	Burnley U21s	Queens Park Rangers U21s	3–0 (H)	8 September 2023	
(England) Kyrell Wilson	Swansea City U21s	Watford U21s	4–4 (H)	2 October 2023	
(Sierra Leone) Daniel Kanu	Charlton Athletic U21s	Bristol City U21s	4–2 (H)	2 October 2023	
(Ghana) Daniel Adu-Adjei	AFC Bournemouth U21s	Swansea City U21s	4–3 (H)	9 November 2023	
(Republic of Ireland) Patrick Casey^{5}	Charlton Athletic U21s	Cardiff City U21s	5–5 (H)	27 November 2023	
(England) Frankie Baker	Millwall U21s	Bristol City U21s	5–1 (H)	27 November 2023	
(United States) Kristian Fletcher	Swansea City U21s	Ipswich Town U21s	4–0 (H)	27 November 2023	
(United States) Kristian Fletcher	Swansea City U21s	Colchester United U21s	4–1 (H)	1 December 2023	
(Republic of Ireland) Aidomo Emakhu	Millwall U21s	Cardiff City U21s	5–1 (H)	18 December 2023	
(England) Tolu Ladapo	Charlton Athletic U21s	Millwall U21s	1–6 (A)	4 January 2024	
(Portugal) Fabio Jalo	Barnsley U21s	Fleetwood Town U21s	2–4 (A)	9 January 2024	
(England) Kaleel Green	Colchester United U21s	Bristol City U21s	6–2 (H)	8 March 2024	
(Guyana) Maliq Cadogan	Swansea City U21s	Watford U21s	0–5 (A)	2 April 2024	
(England) Tyrell Sellars-Fleming	Hull City U21s	Burnley U21s	6–1 (H)	2 April 2024	
(England) Tom Leahy	Millwall U21s	Coventry City U21s	6–0 (H)	9 April 2024	
(Denmark) William Osula	Sheffield United U21s	Coventry City U21s	5–0 (H)	15 April 2024	
(England) Rafferty Pedder	Queens Park Rangers U21s	Charlton Athletic U21s	4–0 (H)	19 April 2024	
(Montserrat) Josiah Dyer	Barnsley U21s	Millwall U21s	3–3 (A)	23 April 2024	
(Ghana) Daniel Adu-Adjei	AFC Bournemouth U21s	Fleetwood Town U21s	5–0 (H)	3 May 2024	

Note

(H) – Home; (A) – Away
^{5} – player scored 5 goals

== See also ==
- 2023–24 in English football
