= Tom Leahy (English footballer) =

English association football player

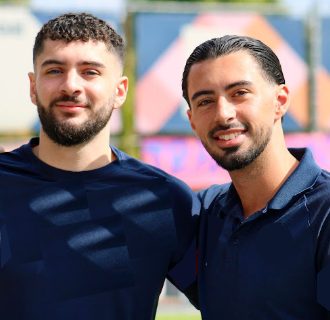
- Tom Leahy with his brother Jack pre-season 2025.

Personal information
- Full name: Tomas Raymond Leahy
- Date of birth: 31 March 2004 (age 22)
- Place of birth: Croydon, England
- Height: 1.81 m (5 ft 11 1/2 in)
- Positions: Striker; right winger; left winger

Team information
- Current team: Maidstone United
- Number: 11

Youth career
- 2016–2018: Chipstead
- 2018–2019: Brighton & Hove Albion
- 2019: Bromley
- 2019–2023: Millwall

Senior career*
Years	Team	Apps	(Gls)
2023–2025	Millwall	1	(0)
2024–2025	→ Woking (loan)	6	(4)
2025	→ Maidstone United (loan)	9	(3)
2025	Welling United	3	(0)
2025–2026	Tonbridge Angels	22	(10)
2026–	Maidstone United	15	(7)
- * Club domestic league appearances and goals as of 8 November 2026

Tomas Raymond Leahy (born 31 March 2004) is an English professional footballer who plays as a attacker for National League South club Maidstone United.

== Playing style ==
Tom Leahy is a dynamic forward known for his work rate, direct running and consistent attacking output. Primarily operating as a winger on either wing or as central striker, he combines pace and intelligent movement to stretch defensive lines and exploit space in behind. His game is built around relentless pressing, often initiating defensive actions high up the pitch and forcing turnovers in dangerous areas.

Leahy is a goal contributor as well as a finisher, linking play and creating opportunities for teammates through unselfish movement and awareness in the final third. He is effective in transition, carrying the ball at speed and committing defenders, while also showing composure in front of goal. Aerially strong for his height, he attacks crosses and offers a target in the box.

== Career ==
=== Millwall ===
Prior to joining Millwall, Leahy had spells at Chipstead, Brighton & Hove Albion and Bromley. On 21 July 2024, in a fixture on Millwall's pre-season tour to Spain, Leahy scored the winning goal in a 2–1 win against Real Murcia. After featuring in several matchday squads during the 2023–24 campaign, Leahy made his first-team debut during Millwall's 4–3 away defeat to Bristol City in August 2024, replacing Shaun Hutchinson.

Leahy was a member Millwalls U21 team that won the 2022–23 U21 Professional Development League and National Play-Off Double, as well as the 2023/24 League Winners.

On 6 September 2024, Leahy joined National League club Woking on loan until January 2025. He went on to make his debut a day later, during a 0–0 draw with Braintree Town, replacing Matt Ward in the 73rd minute. On 28 September 2024, Leahy scored his first goal for Woking against Sutton United, a header in the 74th minute. On 13 January 2025, it was announced that Leahy had returned to Millwall following the conclusion of his loan spell. He scored his final goal for the club during a 4–0 home victory over Radcliffe in the FA Trophy.

On 21 February 2025, Leahy joined National League South side Maidstone United on loan for the remainder of the season. Leahy was an instrumental part of Maidstone United end of season push into the league play-offs, that resulted in making the 2024/25 play-off final.

Leahy was released by Millwall at the end of the 2024–25 season.

=== Welling United ===
On 2 June 2025, Leahy joined recently relegated Isthmian League Premier Division side Welling United. Leahy left the club in October 2025 following the dismissal of manager Lee Martin.

=== Tonbridge Angels ===
On 6 November 2025, Leahy joined National League South club Tonbridge Angels. He made his debut two days later, coming on as a 61st minute substitute in a 1–0 home defeat to league leaders Hornchurch.

The following Tuesday, Leahy went on to make his full debut in the 1 - 1 draw away to Bath City. On 29 November 2025 he scored his first goal for the club at home to Hemel Hempstead.

Leahy scored his third goal for Tonbridge Angels and his first of 2026 on 3 January 2026, in a 2-2 home draw against promotion chasing Dorking Wanderers.

Despite only joining Tonbridge Angels just short of half way through the season, Leahy finished the 2025/26 as their top scorer in the league with 10 goals, scoring his last goal on 18 April 2026 in a 6-1 away win to Farnborough FC.

=== Maidstone United ===
On 16 May 2026, it was announced that Leahy had re-joined National League South club Maidstone United Football Club after previously having a successful loan spell there in the 2024/25 season helping the club reach the National League South play-off final.

Leahy, who scored three times in 11 games in his previous spell at the Gallagher, becomes the first signing for new Maidstone manager Craig Fagan Fagan commented, “Tom is a player we know all about,” said Fagan. “He’s hungry, hardworking, and has the ability to make a real difference for us. We’re pleased to welcome him back to Maidstone.”

== Career statistics ==
As of as of 16 May 2026

Appearances and goals by club, season and competition
Club	Season	Totals			
Club	Season	Division	Apps	Goals	S/R
Millwall	2024–25	Championship	1	0	0.0
Woking (loan)	2024–25	National League	6	4	0.7
Maidstone United (loan)	2024–25	National League South	9	3	0.3
Welling United	2025–26	Isthmian Premier Division	3	0	0.0
Tonbridge Angels	2025–26	National League South	22	10	0.5
Maidstone United	2026–27	National League South	15	7	0.5
Career total			56	24	0.45
