= 2022–23 Professional U21 Development League =

Premier League 2
- Season: 2022–23
- Champions: Manchester City U21s (3rd Title); Division 2 Southampton U21s (1st Title)
- Promoted: Southampton U21s; Leeds United U21s
- Relegated: Tottenham Hotspur U21s; Leicester City U21s
- Matches: 295 (292 RS, 3 PO)
- Goals: 1,098 (3.72 per match) ( 1,089 RS, 9 PO)
- Best player: (Portugal) Carlos Borges Manchester City U21s
- Top goalscorer: Overall (Portugal) Carlos Borges Manchester City U21s (21 Goals); Division 1 (Portugal) Carlos Borges Manchester City U21s (21 Goals); Division 2 (England) Reyes Cleary West Bromwich Albion U21s (Spain) Mateo Joseph Leeds United U21s (16 Goals Each)
- Biggest home win: Southampton U21s 8–1 Middlesbrough U21s (30 October 2022)
- Biggest away win: Leicester City U21s 0–7 Fulham U21s (10 October 2022)
- Highest scoring: Sunderland U21s 5–7 Middlesbrough U21s (9 January 2023) Record
- Longest winning run: 4 Matches Manchester City U21s
- Longest unbeaten run: 11 Matches Manchester City U21s
- Longest winless run: 20 matches Entire season Derby County U21s
- Longest losing run: 12 matches Derby County U21s (5 August 2022-13 February 2023)
- Highest attendance: 12,546 Leeds United U21s 3–0 Nottingham Forest U21s (15 May 2023) Play-Off Final
- Lowest attendance: 30 Derby County U21s 0–2 Aston Villa U21s (29 October 2022)

The 2022–23 Professional U21 Development League was the 11th season of the Professional Development League system.

The Premier League 2 reverted back to a U21 competition ahead of the 2022–23 season. Burnley, Birmingham City and Reading left the league after failing to retain category one academy status.

For the 2022–23 season onwards, player eligibility was restricted to under-21 players (reduced from under-23) born after 1 January 2001. To help with the transition, teams were allowed up to five over-age outfield players (up from three) and one over-age goalkeeper for the 2022-23 season.

== Premier League 2 ==
=== Division 1 ===
As of match played 8 May 2023

==== Table ====
Pos	Team	Pld	W	D	L	GF	GA	GD	Pts
1	Manchester City U21s (C)	26	18	5	3	80	31	+49	59
2	Liverpool U21s	26	13	7	6	46	29	+17	46
3	Chelsea U21s	26	12	7	7	55	42	+13	43
4	Crystal Palace U21s	26	11	9	6	45	42	+3	42
5	Fulham U21s	26	11	8	7	50	39	+11	41
6	Brighton & Hove Albion U21s	26	11	6	9	58	49	+9	39
7	Arsenal U21s	26	8	10	8	39	40	−1	34
8	Everton U21s	26	9	5	12	39	51	−12	32
9	Manchester United U21s	26	6	12	8	46	64	−18	30
10	Blackburn Rovers U21s	26	9	2	15	42	52	−10	29
11	West Ham United U21s	26	8	4	14	39	49	−10	28
12	Wolverhampton Wanderers U21	26	8	4	14	39	50	−11	28
13	Tottenham Hotspur U21s (R)	26	6	10	10	34	46	−12	28
14	Leicester City U21s (R)	26	4	7	15	29	57	−28	19

(C) Champions; (R) Relegated

==== Results ====
Home \ Away	ARS	BLA	BHA	CHE	CRY	EVE	FUL	LEI	LIV	MNC	MNU	TOT	WHU	WOL
Arsenal U21ss		4–1	3–3	4–1	1–1	3–1	1–1	2–1	0–1	0–3	3–1	1–2	1–1	1–1
Blackburn Rovers U21s	1–1		1–2	2–3	1–3	4–2	2–3	0–4	2–3	0–3	6–1	3–2	2–2	0–1
Brighton & Hove Albion U21s	2–2	4–2		2–2	2–4	1–2	1–0	3–1	1–1	3–2	3–2	4–0	3–2	3–1
Chelsea U21s	1–0	3–0	1–4		1–2	1–1	0–3	2–2	3–1	2–2	3–3	3–0	2–3	2–0
Crystal Palace U21s	2–0	0–3	3–2	3–3		3–4	1–2	0–0	0–1	0–5	0–0	3–0	3–3	2–1
Everton U21s	1–4	2–0	1–0	0–2	0–1		1–1	0–2	1–1	6–3	2–2	1–1	1–2	3–0
Fulham U21s	2–1	3–0	3–2	2–4	2–2	2–0		2–2	0–4	2–2	1–2	4–3	3–1	2–1
Leicester City U21s	1–2	0–1	1–4	0–2	1–1	1–4	0–7		0–1	0–0	3–2	2–2	3–1	0–1
Liverpool U21s	1–1	1–0	2–2	0–0	0–1	2–1	3–1	7–1		0–3	2–2	0–2	1–0	5–0
Manchester City U21s	6–0	1–3	2–1	3–1	3–3	5–0	1–0	3–1	3–1		6–0	0–0	4–1	4–3
Manchester United U21s	1–0	2–1	3–3	1–3	1–5	4–1	2–2	2–2	2–1	1–6		2–2	1–1	3–2
Tottenham Hotspur U21s	0–0	1–3	3–1	3–2	1–1	0–2	1–1	3–1	3–3	1–2	1–1		1–0	1–1
West Ham United U21s	2–3	1–3	3–2	0–1	0–1	1–2	1–0	2–0	0–3	1–5	2–3	1–0		3–1
Wolverhampton Wanderers U21s	2–0	0–1	2–0	1–7	5–0	5–0	1–1	3–0	0–1	1–3	2–2	4–1	0–5	

Legend: Blue = home team win; Yellow = draw; Red = away team win.

=== Division 2 ===
As of match played 15 May 2023

==== Table ====
Pos	Team	Pld	W	D	L	GF	GA	GD	Pts
1	Southampton U21s (C, P)	20	13	3	4	54	28	+26	42
2	Leeds United U21s (P)	20	13	3	4	53	29	+24	42
3	Nottingham Forest U21s	20	13	2	5	44	28	+16	41
4	West Bromwich Albion U21s	20	11	4	5	47	35	+12	37
5	Aston Villa U21s	20	10	3	7	46	35	+11	33
6	Norwich City U21s	20	8	6	6	41	38	+3	30
7	Middlesbrough U21s	20	7	5	8	46	49	−3	26
8	Newcastle United U21s	20	6	5	9	35	41	−6	23
9	Sunderland U21s	20	5	5	10	37	44	−7	20
10	Stoke City U21s	20	3	5	12	26	45	−19	14
11	Derby County U21s	20	0	1	19	13	70	−57	1

(C) Champions; (P) Promoted

==== Results ====
Home \ Away	AST	DER	LEE	MID	NEW	NOR	NOT	SOU	STK	SUN	WBA
Aston Villa U21s		3–0	1–2	3–3	1–2	2–1	1–1	1–2	1–0	6–4	2–6
Derby County U21s	0–2		2–5	1–5	1–4	0–3	0–1	1–3	1–6	0–4	1–5
Leeds United U21s	2–1	3–0		3–1	4–2	2–2	5–1	6–2	4–0	3–1	1–2
Middlesbrough U21s	2–3	3–1	2–4		1–1	1–3	0–1	2–2	4–1	2–0	2–4
Newcastle United U21s	0–2	4–0	2–2	0–0		4–3	2–1	3–2	0–1	1–1	2–5
Norwich City U21s	1–3	2–1	5–2	2–2	4–2		0–3	2–5	3–0	3–2	1–1
Nottingham Forest U21s	4–3	7–2	1–0	1–4	3–1	4–1		1–3	4–1	1–0	0–0
Southampton U21s	2–0	3–0	1–2	8–1	4–1	1–1	0–2		2–0	2–2	4–1
Stoke City U21s	3–3	4–0	1–1	1–2	2–2	2–2	1–2	0–3		2–3	0–0
Sunderland U21s	0–4	1–1	0–1	5–7	2–1	0–0	3–1	1–3	4–1		3–3
West Bromwich Albion U21s	0–4	2–1	2–1	5–2	2–1	1–2	1–5	1–2	4–0	2–1	

Legend: Blue = home team win; Yellow = draw; Red = away team win.

===== Play-offs =====
The date for semi-finals is confirmed as 8 May 2023 at 19:00.
The date for final is confirmed as 15 May 2023 at 19:00.

Semi-finals
2	Leeds United U21s	2
5	Aston Villa U21s	1
3	Nottingham Forest U21s	3
4	West Bromwich Albion U21s	0

Final
Leeds United U21s	3
Nottingham Forest U21s	0

==== Semifinals ====
8 May 2023
13:00

Leeds United U21s	2–1	Aston Villa U21s
Joseph 29'; Perkins 43'	Report	Young 16'

Elland Road, Beeston
Attendance: 3,709
Referee: Garreth Rhodes

8 May 2023
13:00

Nottingham Forest U21s	3–0	West Bromwich Albion U21s
Konate 16'; Hammond 29'; Osong 38'	Report

Impact Arena, Alfreton
Attendance: 177
Referee: Steven Copeland

==== Final ====
15 May 2023
13:00

Leeds United U21s	3–0	Nottingham Forest U21s
Rutter 20'; Chilokoa-Mullen 38'; Moore 54'	Report

Elland Road, Beeston
Attendance: 12,546
Referee: Edward Duckworth

== Top goalscorers ==
=== Division 1 ===
As of 8 May 2023

Rank	Player	Club	Goals
1	(Portugal) Carlos Forbs	Manchester City U21s	21
2	(England) Divin Mubama	West Ham United U21s	13
3	(Wales) Luke Harris	Fulham U21s	12
4	(England) Joe Hugill	Manchester United U21s	13
4	(Scotland) Dire Mebude	Manchester City U21s	13
4	(England) Layton Stewart	Liverpool U21s	13
7	(England) Mason Burstow	Chelsea U21s	10
7	(England) Harry Leonard	Crystal Palace U23s	10
7	(England) Stan Mills	Everton U21s	10
7	(Republic of Ireland) Andrew Moran	Brighton & Hove Albion U21s	10

=== Division 2 ===
As of 15 May 2023

Rank	Player	Club	Goals
1	(England) Reyes Cleary	West Bromwich Albion U21s	16
1	(Spain) Mateo Joseph	Leeds United U21s	16
3	(England) Dominic Ballard	Southampton U21s	14
4	(England) Abu Kamara	Norwich City U21s	13
5	(England) Sonny Perkins	Leeds United U21s	12
6	(France) Ateef Konate	Nottingham Forest U21s	9

=== Hat-tricks ===
As of 15 May 2023

Player	For	Against	Result	Date	Division	Ref.
(Spain) Mateo Joseph^{4}	Leeds United U21s	Derby County U21s	2–5 (A)	5 August 2022	Division 2	
(Wales) Luke Harris	Fulham U21s	Chelsea U21s	0–3 (A)	15 August 2022	Division 1	
(England) Max Thompson	Sunderland U21s	Derby County U21s	0–4 (A)	21 August 2022	Division 2	
(Republic of Ireland) Evan Ferguson	Brighton & Hove Albion U21s	Leicester City U21s	1–4 (A)	3 September 2022	Division 1	
(England) John-Kymani Gordon	Crystal Palace U21s	Tottenham Hotspur U21s	3–0 (H)	3 September 2022	Division 1	
(England) Patrick Bamford	Leeds United U21s	Southampton U21s	6–2 (H)	16 September 2022	Division 2	
(Spain) Mateo Joseph	Leeds United U21s	Stoke City U21s	4–0 (H)	30 September 2022	Division 2	
(England) Layton Stewart	Liverpool U21s	Wolverhampton Wanderers U21s	4–0 (H)	8 October 2022	Division 1	
(England) Reyes Cleary	West Bromwich Albion U21s	Middlesbrough U21s	5–2 (H)	10 October 2022	Division 2	
(Spain) Mateo Joseph	Leeds United U21s	Middlesbrough U21s	2–4 (A)	22 October 2022	Division 2	
(France) Sékou Mara^{4}	Southampton U21s	Middlesbrough U21s	8–1 (H)	30 October 2022	Division 2	
(England) Theo Walcott	Southampton U21s	Middlesbrough U21s	8–1 (H)	30 October 2022	Division 2	
(Portugal) Carlos Borges^{4}	Manchester City U21s	Manchester United U21s	1–6 (A)	5 November 2022	Division 1	
(England) Max Dean	Leeds United U21s	Newcastle United U21s	4–2 (H)	7 November 2022	Division 2	
(England) Omari Forson	Manchester United U21s	Everton U21s	4–1 (H)	11 February 2023	Division 1	
(England) Harry Gardiner	Sunderland U21s	Stoke City U21s	4–1 (H)	6 March 2023	Division 2	
(England) Jeremy Sivi	Middlesbrough U21s	Derby County U21s	1–5 (A)	24 March 2023	Division 2	
(England) Reyes Cleary	West Bromwich Albion U21s	Derby County U21s	1–5 (A)	3 April 2023	Division 2	
(Australia) Cameron Peupion	Brighton & Hove Albion U21s	Manchester City U21s	3–2 (H)	9 April 2023	Division 1	
(England) Owen Farmer	Wolverhampton Wanderers U21s	Everton U21s	5–0 (H)	10 April 2023	Division 1	
(Republic of Ireland) Nathan Fraser	Wolverhampton Wanderers U21s	Crystal Palace U21s	5–0 (H)	24 April 2023	Division 1	

Note

(H) – Home; (A) – Away
^{4} – player scored 4 goals

=== Awards ===
Player of the season: (Portugal) Carlos Borges (Manchester City U21s)

=== Player of the Month ===
Month	Player	Club	Ref.
August	(England) Sonny Perkins	Leeds United U21s	
September	(England) John-Kymani Gordon	Crystal Palace U21s	
October	(France) Ateef Konate	Nottingham Forest U21s	
January	(England) Joe Hugill	Manchester United U21s	
February	(Portugal) Carlos Borges	Manchester City U21s	
March	(England) Mason Burstow	Chelsea U21s	
April	(Australia) Cameron Peupion	Brighton & Hove Albion U21s	

== Professional Development League ==
U21 Professional Development League
- Season: 2022–23
- Champions: Millwall U21s (1st Title)
- Regular Season Champions: Millwall U21s (1st Title)
- Matches: 283 (280 RS, 3 PO)
- Goals: 1,001 (3.54 per match) (987 RS, 14 PO)
- Top goalscorer: (England) Louie Marsh Sheffield United U21s (23 Goals)
- Biggest home win: Swansea City U21s 10–1 Birmingham City U21s (10 May 2023)
- Biggest away win: Burnley U21s 0–6 Hull City U21s (31 October 2022); Watford U21s 0–6 Colchester United U21s (1 November 2022)
- Highest scoring: Swansea City U21s 10–1 Birmingham City U21s (10 May 2023)
- Longest winning run: 7 Matches Millwall U21s; Sheffield United U21s
- Longest unbeaten run: 13 Matches Sheffield United U21s
- Longest winless run: 10 Matches Sheffield Wednesday U21s
- Longest losing run: 8 Matches Watford U21s
- Highest attendance: 2,076 Millwall U21s 2–1 Sheffield United U21s (22 May 2023)

The Professional Development League is Under-21 football's second tier, designed for those academies with Category 2 status. The league is split regionally into north and south divisions, with each team facing opponents in their own region twice both home and away and opponents in the other region once resulting in 28 games being played by both divisions. The sides finishing in the top two positions in both regions at the end of the season will progress to a knockout stage to determine the overall league champion. Coventry City U21s are the defending champions.

20 Teams competed in the league this season, 3 more than the previous season. Burnley U21s and Birmingham City U21s returned to the league after failing to retain Category One Academy status after 2 seasons for Burnley U21s, and 1 season for Birmingham City U21s. Reading U21s joined after temporarily dropping to Category Two status after 10 seasons in the Premier League 2.

=== Tables ===
==== North Division ====
Pos	Team	Pld	W	D	L	GF	GA	GD	Pts	Qualification
1	Sheffield United U21s	28	18	6	4	59	30	+29	60	Qualification for Knock-out stage
2	Hull City U21s	28	13	3	12	60	48	+12	42	Qualification for Knock-out stage
3	Wigan Athletic U21s	28	13	3	12	56	44	+12	42	
4	Coventry City U21s	28	11	6	11	44	38	+6	39	
5	Burnley U21s	28	11	5	12	45	57	−12	38	
6	Peterborough United U21s	28	10	7	11	52	55	−3	37	
7	Barnsley U21s	28	10	6	12	41	41	0	36	
8	Crewe Alexandra U21s	28	8	7	13	35	56	−21	31	
9	Birmingham City U21s	28	7	8	13	38	61	−23	29	
10	Sheffield Wednesday U21s	28	5	4	19	22	55	−33	19	

==== South Division ====
Pos	Team	Pld	W	D	L	GF	GA	GD	Pts	Qualification
1	Millwall U21s	28	18	7	3	70	32	+38	61	Qualification for Knock-out stage
2	Bristol City U21s	28	16	5	7	47	26	+21	53	Qualification for Knock-out stage
3	Swansea City U21s	28	16	4	8	80	46	+34	52	
4	Cardiff City U21s	28	13	3	12	47	57	−10	42	
5	Reading U21s	28	12	5	11	44	40	+4	41	
6	Ipswich Town U21s	28	11	6	11	60	61	−1	39	
7	Queens Park Rangers U21s	28	10	8	10	54	52	+2	38	
8	Charlton Athletic U21s	28	10	7	11	56	59	−3	37	
9	Colchester United U21s	28	7	7	14	46	63	−17	28	
10	Watford U21s	28	6	3	19	31	66	−35	21	

=== Knock-out stage ===
Semi-finals

15 May 2023
12:00

Sheffield United U21s	4–0	Bristol City U21s
Marsh 9'; Osula 42', 67', 71'	Report

Brammall Lane, Sheffield

15 May 2023
14:00

Millwall U21s	4–3	Hull City U21s
Esse 45+1', 90+5'; Emakhu 73'; Baker 101'	Report	Wood 8'; Palit 14'; Jarvis 49'

The Den, Bermondsey

Professional Development League National Final

22 May 2023
19:00

Millwall U21s	2–1 (a.e.t.)	Sheffield United U21s
Esse 11'; Okoli 103'	Report 1 Report 2	Peck 64'

The Den, Bermondsey
Attendance: 2,076
Referee: C Walchester

=== Top goalscorers ===
As of 22 May 2023

Rank	Player	Club	Goals
1	(England) Louie Marsh	Sheffield United U21s	23
2	(Wales) Josh Thomas	Swansea City U21s	17
3	(England) Abdul Abdulmalik	Millwall U21s	16
4	(Denmark) William Osula	Sheffield United U21s	14
5	(Sierra Leone) Daniel Kanu	Charlton Athletic U21s	13
5	(England) Seb Palmer-Houlden	Bristol City U21s	13
5	(England) Chris Sze	Wigan Athletic U21s	13
8	(England) Seb Drozd	Millwall U21s	11
8	(Wales) Connor Evans	Crewe Alexandra U21s	11
8	(England) Bradley Ihionvien	Colchester United U21s	11
8	(England) Will Jarvis	Hull City U21s	11
8	(England) Jim Simms	Hull City U21s	11

=== Hat-tricks ===
As of 22 May 2023

Player	For	Against	Result	Date	Ref.
(England) Jim Simms	Hull City U21s	Watford U21s	5–0 (H)	22 August 2022	
(Northern Ireland) Gavin Whyte	Cardiff City U21s	Sheffield United U21s	0–3 (A)	23 August 2022	
(Republic of Ireland) Sinclair Armstrong	Queens Park Rangers U21s	Cardiff City U21s	3–5 (A)	16 September 2022	
(Republic of Ireland) Dara Costelloe	Burnley U21s	Coventry City U21s	1–3 (A)	18 October 2022	
(England) Femi Azeez	Reading U21s	Ipswich Town U21s	2–7 (A)	4 November 2022	
(England) Chris Sze	Wigan Athletic U21s	Birmingham City U21s	5–0 (H)	16 January 2023	
(Wales) Connor Evans	Crewe Alexandra U21s	Burnley U21s	3–4 (A)	24 January 2023	
(Wales) Connor Evans	Crewe Alexandra U21s	Ipswich Town U21s	3–2 (H)	27 March 2023	
(Wales) Ruben Davies^{4}	Swansea City U21s	Ipswich Town U21s	5–3 (H)	31 March 2023	
(Brazil) Matheus Martins	Watford U21s	Peterborough United U21s	7–0 (H)	31 March 2023	
(England) Seb Palmer-Houlden	Bristol City U21s	Ipswich Town U21s	4–1 (H)	11 April 2023	
(England) Louie Marsh	Sheffield United U21s	Colchester United U21s	7–1 (H)	2 May 2023	
(Denmark) William Osula	Sheffield United U21s	Colchester United U21s	7–1 (H)	2 May 2023	
(England) Harry Wood	Hull City U21s	Charlton Athletic U21s	0–5 (A)	9 May 2023	
(Wales) Josh Thomas^{4}	Swansea City U21s	Birmingham City U21s	10–1 (H)	10 May 2023	
(Denmark) William Osula	Sheffield United U21s	Bristol City U21s	4–0 (H)	15 May 2023	

Note

(H) – Home; (A) – Away
^{4} – player scored 4 goals

== See also ==
- 2022–23 in English football
