= Benicio Baker-Boaitey =

English association football player

Personal information
- Full name: Benicio Baker-Boaitey
- Date of birth: 9 January 2004 (age 22)
- Place of birth: Hammersmith, England
- Position: Winger

Team information
- Current team: Millwall
- Number: 26

Youth career
- –2020: West Ham United
- 2020–2022: Porto
- 2022: → Brighton & Hove Albion (loan)
- 2022–2023: Brighton & Hove Albion

Senior career*
Years	Team	Apps	(Gls)
2023–2025	Brighton & Hove Albion	5	(0)
2024–2025	→ Port Vale (loan)	10	(0)
2025–	Millwall	0	(0)

International career
2019	England U16	2	(0)
2024	England U20	2	(0)
- * Club domestic league appearances and goals as of 28 December 2025

Benicio Baker-Boaitey (born 9 January 2004) is an English professional footballer who plays as a winger for EFL Championship club Millwall.

Baker-Boaitey, an England youth international, had spells in the youth academies of West Ham United and Porto before turning professional at Brighton & Hove Albion in July 2023. He spent the first half of the 2024–25 season on loan at Port Vale before he joined Millwall on a permanent transfer in January 2025.

== Club career ==
=== Early career ===
Having come through the youth academy of West Ham United, Baker-Boaitey was 16 when he rejected a professional contract with them to join FC Porto in 2020. He also had the opportunity to join Bundesliga sides Bayern Munich and Borussia Mönchengladbach, though opted for the Primeira Liga side. Porto paid West Ham compensation in the region of £190,000.

=== Brighton & Hove Albion ===
Baker-Boaitey signed for the academy of Brighton & Hove Albion on transfer deadline day in January 2022, initially on a six-month loan deal. The move became permanent in June 2022 after he impressed academy coach Andrew Crofts. He played in the Sussex Community Shield final and scored his penalty in the shoot-out victory over Littlehampton Town. He featured ten times for Brighton under-21's in Premier League 2 during the 2022–23 season. He signed a new one-year contract with the club in July. On 12 November 2023, he was named among the match day squad in the Premier League as Brighton played against Sheffield United at Falmer Stadium. Three weeks later on 3 December, Baker-Boaitey made his senior and professional debut with the Albion, coming on as a late substitution in a 3–2 loss to Chelsea. He featured in six games under manager Roberto De Zerbi and agreed a new contract at the end of the 2023–24 season.

On 7 August 2024, Baker-Boaitey completed a season-long loan move to League Two club Port Vale. On 7 September, he started in a 4–1 win at Newport County and was subsequently named in the EFL League Two Team of the Week. However, he was sidelined with a pelvic injury at the start of December. He was recalled to Brighton on 8 January after having made 14 appearances for the Valiants, claiming two assists, with manager Darren Moore remarking that he had been "a real game changer when on his game". When the player was sold later in the window, technical director David Weir called it "a good move for all parties".

=== Millwall ===
On 3 February 2025, Baker-Boaitey signed a "long-term contract" with Championship club Millwall after joining for an undisclosed fee. The club's director of football, Steve Gallen, described him as "an exciting prospect" who would go straight into head coach Alex Neil's first team. However, he did not feature in the remainder of the 2024–25 season or the 2025–26 campaign.

In March 2025, Alex Neil commented Baker-Boaitey had been recovering from injuries and had been removed from training after appearing not to be fully fit. Neil added that the club planned to gradually introduce him to the squad through the under-21 team. In August 2026, Neil again cited Baker-Boaitey’s fitness when asked about his absence from the first team. In November 2026, Millwall began disciplinary proceedings against Baker-Boaitey following alleged misconduct, including social media posts critical of senior figures at the club. The account was subsequently deactivated. He was also reported to have been suspended from training while the club investigated the matter, with termination of his contract being among the possible outcomes.

== International career ==
On 7 June 2024, Baker-Boaitey made his England U20 debut in a 2–1 win over Sweden at Stadion ŠRC Sesvete.

== Style of play ==
Baker-Boaitey has been described as a left-footed wide player, with comparisons made in his style of play to former Juventus player Douglas Costa. He has pace and can play as a wide or inside winger.

== Personal life ==
From London, he has Ghanaian heritage.

== Career statistics ==
As of match played 3 December 2024

Appearances and goals by club, season and competition
Club	Season	League			FA Cup		EFL Cup		Other		Total	
Club	Season	Division	Apps	Goals	Apps	Goals	Apps	Goals	Apps	Goals	Apps	Goals
Brighton & Hove Albion	2023–24	Premier League	5	0	1	0	0	0	0	0	6	0
Brighton & Hove Albion	2024–25	Premier League	0	0	0	0	0	0	—		0	0
Brighton & Hove Albion	Total		5	0	1	0	0	0	0	0	6	0
Brighton & Hove Albion U21	2022–23	—	—		—		—		1 (Note: Appearance(s) in the EFL Trophy)	0	1	0
Brighton & Hove Albion U21	2023–24	—	—		—		—		3	0	3	0
Brighton & Hove Albion U21	Total		0	0	0	0	0	0	4	0	4	0
Port Vale (loan)	2024–25	League Two	10	0	1	0	1	0	2	0	14	0
Millwall	2024–25	Championship	0	0	0	0	—		—		0	0
Millwall	2025–26	Championship	0	0	0	0	0	0	0	0	0	0
Millwall	2026–27	Championship	0	0	0	0	0	0	—		0	0
Millwall	Total		0	0	0	0	0	0	0	0	0	0
Career total			15	0	2	0	1	0	6	0	24	0
