= Romain Esse =

English footballer

Personal information
- Full name: Romain Joy Kouakou Esse
- Date of birth: 13 May 2005 (age 21)
- Place of birth: Lambeth, England
- Height: 1.75 m (5 ft 9 in)
- Positions: Winger; forward

Team information
- Current team: Millwall (on loan from Crystal Palace)
- Number: 11

Youth career
- 2014–2022: Millwall

Senior career*
Years	Team	Apps	(Gls)
2022–2025	Millwall	61	(6)
2025–	Crystal Palace	11	(1)
2026	→ Coventry City (loan)	17	(2)
2026–	→ Millwall (loan)	2	(0)

International career^{‡}
2023	England U18	6	(1)
2023	England U19	8	(1)
2024–2025	England U20	10	(1)
2025–	England U21	3	(1)
- * Club domestic league appearances and goals as of 12 September 2026 (UTC) ‡ National team caps and goals as of 00:05, 1 April 2026 (UTC)

Romain Joy Kouakou Esse (born 13 May 2005) is an English professional footballer who plays as a winger or forward for EFL Championship club Millwall, on loan from Crystal Palace.

== Club career ==
=== Millwall ===
Esse is a youth product of Millwall, and impressed in his first senior appearance in a cameo in a friendly against Brøndby in November 2022. He made his professional debut with Millwall as a late substitute in a 2–0 EFL Championship win over Watford on 26 December 2022. On 19 January 2023, he signed his first professional contract with the club and was promoted to their senior team for the rest of the season.

On 5 August 2023, he scored his first senior goal in a 1–0 win against Middlesbrough, from an assist by Aidomo Emakhu.

=== Crystal Palace ===
On 18 January 2025, Esse joined local rivals Crystal Palace signing a five-and-a-half year contract. The fee was undisclosed, but was reported to be £12 million, potentially rising to £14.5 million with add-ons. Esse scored against Brentford in a 2–1 loss for Crystal Palace in the Premier League on 26 January with his first touch for the club after coming on as a late substititute.

==== Coventry City (loan) ====
On 7 January 2026, Esse joined Championship leaders Coventry City on loan for the remainder of the season.

==== Millwall (loan) ====
On 2 September 2026, Esse returned to his former club Millwall on loan until the end of the 2026–27 season.

== International career ==
On 22 March 2023, Esse made his England U18 debut during a 2–1 win over Croatia in Medulin.

On 6 September 2023, Esse made his England U19 debut during a 1–0 defeat to Germany in Oliva.

On 29 August 2025, Esse was called up to the England under-21s. He made his debut as a substitute during a 2027 UEFA European Under-21 Championship qualification win away to Kazakhstan on 8 September 2025.

== Personal life ==
Born in England, Esse is of Ivorian descent. He attended St Thomas the Apostle College for five years, where he featured in a number of school matches and played an important role in their success.

== Career statistics ==
As of match played 12 September 2026

Appearances and goals by club, season and competition
Club	Season	League			FA Cup		EFL Cup		Europe		Other		Total	
Club	Season	Division	Apps	Goals	Apps	Goals	Apps	Goals	Apps	Goals	Apps	Goals	Apps	Goals
Millwall	2022–23	Championship	12	0	1	0	0	0	—		—		13	0
Millwall	2023–24	Championship	25	2	1	0	1	0	—		—		27	2
Millwall	2024–25	Championship	24	4	0	0	2	1	—		—		26	5
Millwall	Total		61	6	2	0	3	1	—		—		66	7
Crystal Palace	2024–25	Premier League	7	1	2	0	—		—		—		9	1
Crystal Palace	2025–26	Premier League	4	0	—		1	0	3 (Note: Appearances in UEFA Conference League)	0	0	0	8	0
Crystal Palace	Total		11	1	2	0	1	0	3	0	0	0	17	1
Coventry City (loan)	2025–26	Championship	17	2	1	0	—		—		—		18	2
Millwall (loan)	2026–27	Championship	2	0	0	0	1		—		—		3	0
Career total			91	9	5	0	5	1	3	0	0	0	104	10

== Honours ==
Crystal Palace

- FA Cup: 2024–25
- FA Community Shield: 2025
- UEFA Conference League: 2025–26

Coventry City

- EFL Championship: 2025–26
