= Japhet Tanganga =

English footballer (born 1999)

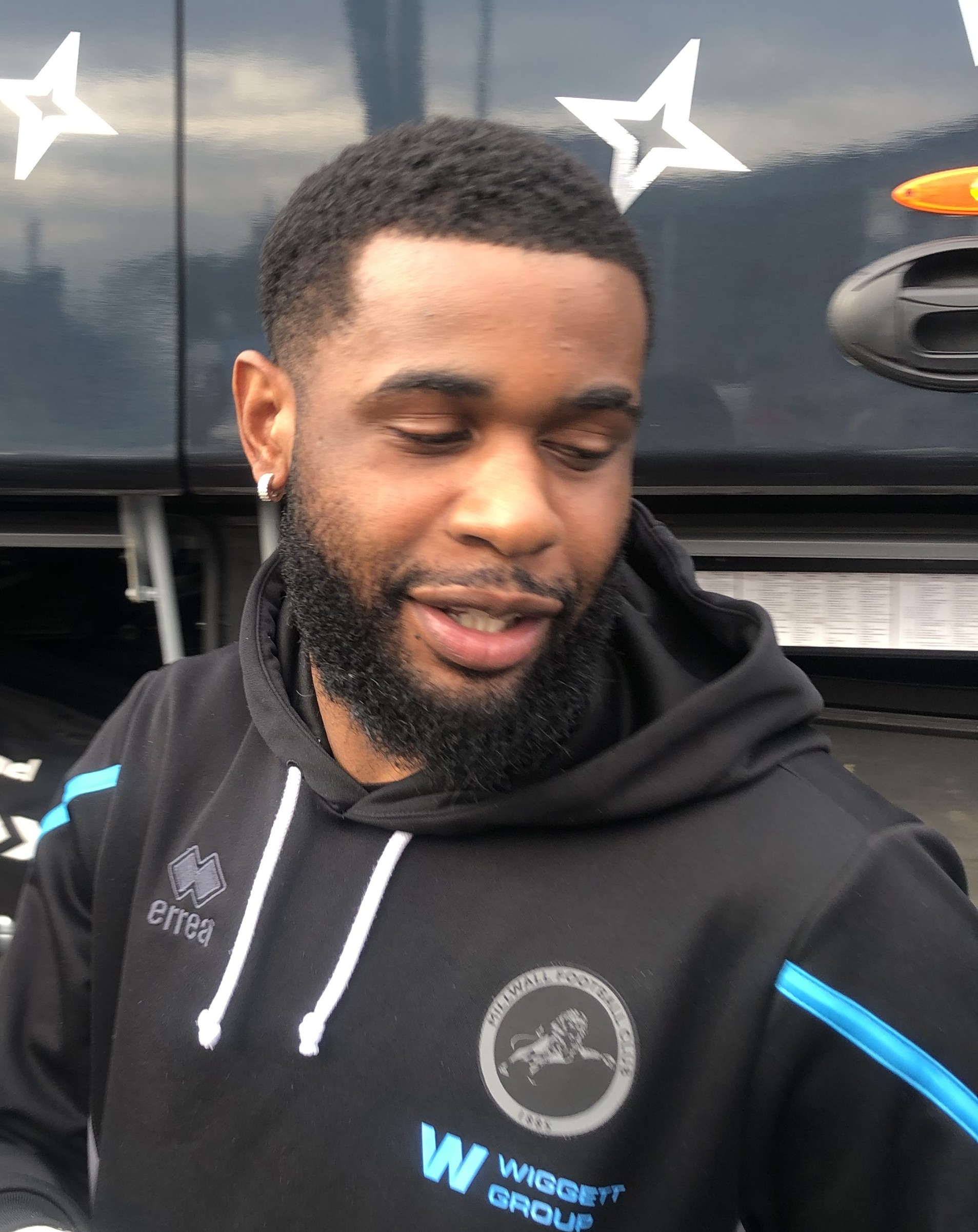
- Tanganga with Millwall in 2025

Personal information
- Full name: Japhet Manzambi Tanganga
- Date of birth: 31 March 1999 (age 27)
- Place of birth: Hackney, England
- Height: 6 ft 0 in (1.84 m)
- Position: Defender

Team information
- Current team: Sheffield United
- Number: 5

Youth career
- 2009–2019: Tottenham Hotspur

Senior career*
Years	Team	Apps	(Gls)
2019–2024	Tottenham Hotspur	27	(0)
2023–2024	→ FC Augsburg (loan)	0	(0)
2024	→ Millwall (loan)	18	(2)
2024–2025	Millwall	42	(2)
2025–	Sheffield United	56	(3)

International career
2014–2015	England U16	3	(0)
2016	England U17	4	(0)
2016–2017	England U18	6	(0)
2017–2018	England U19	11	(1)
2017–2019	England U20	10	(0)
2021	England U21	2	(0)
- * Club domestic league appearances and goals as of 21 November 2026 (UTC)

Japhet Manzambi Tanganga (born 31 March 1999) is an English professional footballer who plays as a defender for and captains EFL Championship club Sheffield United.

== Early life ==
Tanganga was born in Hackney, Greater London, to a Congolese family. He attended Greig City Academy and joined the Tottenham Hotspur youth academy at the age of 10.

== Club career ==
=== Tottenham Hotspur ===
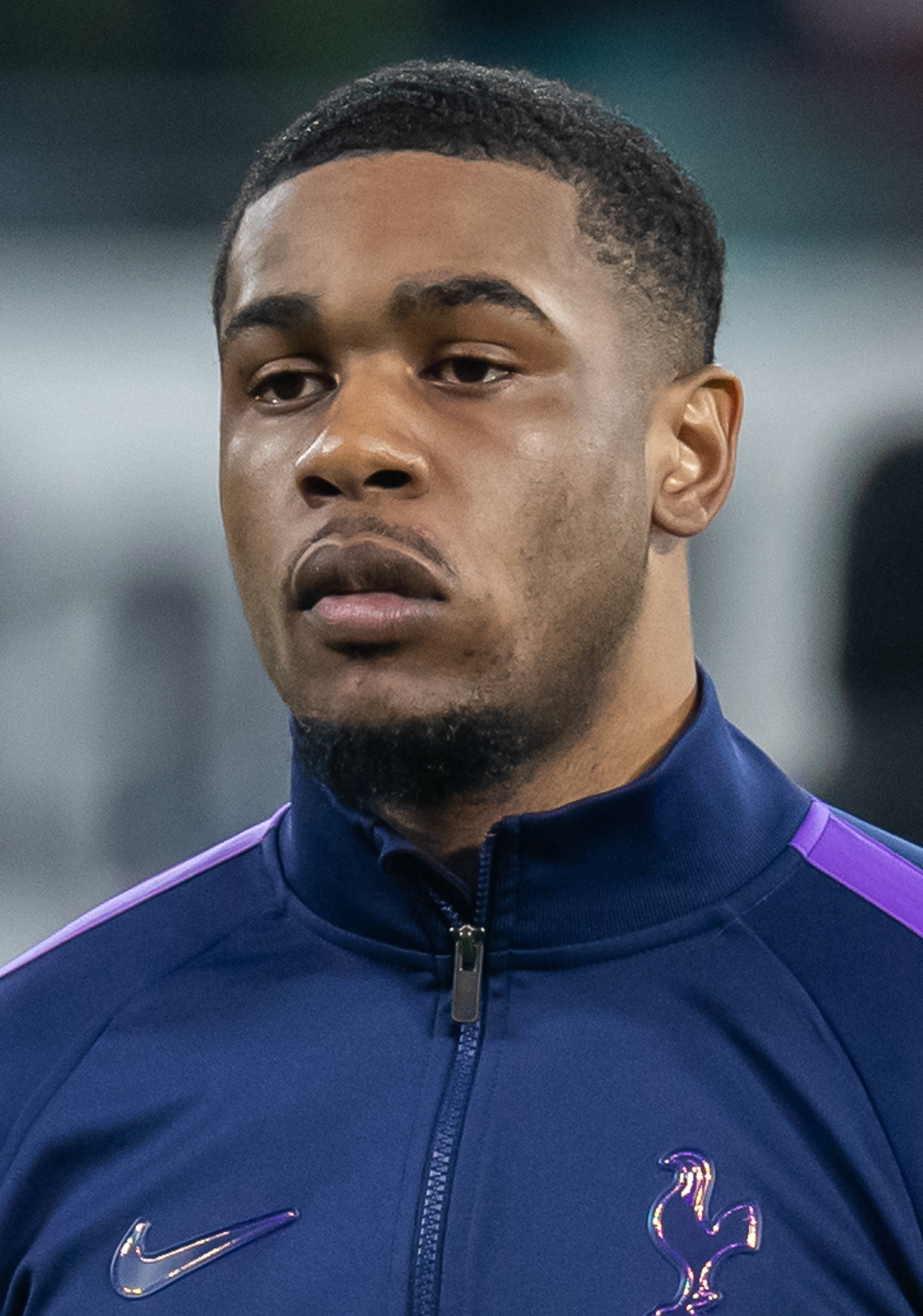
Tanganga with Tottenham Hotspur in 2020.

In June 2019, Tanganga extended his contract with Tottenham until 2020. On 24 September 2019, he made his debut in the EFL Cup, in an away match to Colchester United. Tanganga made his full Premier League debut on 11 January 2020, in a 1–0 home defeat against Liverpool. Three days later he played the entire 90 minutes in an FA Cup replay against Middlesbrough, which Spurs won 2–1, and was named man of the match.

On 27 July 2020, Tanganga signed a new contract with Tottenham, extending his contract until 2025. However, he suffered from a series of injuries and, aside from a EFL Cup game against Chelsea in September, he did not play any games from March 2020 when League football was suspended due to the COVID-19 pandemic until 26 November 2020, in a UEFA Europa League match against Ludogorets Razgrad. Following his return, he made only a few appearances for the remainder of the season.

On 16 August 2021, Tanganga started Tottenham's first game of the 2021–22 season, and was named man of the match in a 1–0 victory against Manchester City. In a September Premier League game away at Crystal Palace, he was sent off after receiving two yellow cards in quick succession while the score was 0–0. Tottenham eventually lost 3–0.

Tanganga was ruled out for the remainder of the 2021–22 season after he suffered a knee injury on 24 January 2022 in a 2–0 loss to Chelsea. He made 19 appearances that season, 11 of which were in the league.

Tanganga was released by Tottenham at the end of the 2023–24 season.

==== Loan to Augsburg ====
On 1 September, Tanganga joined Bundesliga club Augsburg on a season-long loan with an obligation to buy. However, he did not make any appearances for Augsburg, sitting on the bench only once during his time there. He returned to Tottenham in January 2024.

==== Loan to Millwall ====
On 18 January 2024, Tanganga joined Millwall on loan until the end of the season.

=== Millwall ===
On 10 July 2024, Tanganga joined Millwall on a permanent long-term contract. He was named as the club's Player of the Year for the 2024–25.

=== Sheffield United ===
On 28 August 2025, Tanganga joined fellow Championship club Sheffield United on a three-year deal for a significant undisclosed fee, reported to be in the region of £7 million with up to a further £3 million in add-ons. On 1 January 2026, he scored his first goal for the club in a 3–1 victory over Leicester City.

Tanganga received a straight red card during a fixture against Charlton Athletic for a dangerous aerial challenge. The red card was appealed by Sheffield United but the appeal was ultimately denied a few days later.

== International career ==
Tanganga has represented England at various youth levels at under-16, 17, 18, 19 and 20 teams.

In 2014, Tanganga represented the England under-16 team against Scotland in the Victory Shield. In 2017, he took part in the Toulon Tournament, coming on as a second-half substitute in the final as England defeated Ivory Coast to retain their title.

Tanganga also played at the 2018 UEFA European Under-19 Championship and scored in their opening group game against Turkey.

Although eligible to represent the Democratic Republic of Congo, Tanganga stated in May 2020 that he intended to pursue an international career with England, saying: "In life you have to have goals and one of my goals is to be capped at senior level for England".

On 2 October 2020, Tanganga received his first call-up to the England Under-21 squad but withdrew on 5 October 2020 due to injury. Tanganga eventually made his debut for the U21 side in the 2021 UEFA European Under-21 Championship, starting in a 2-0 group stage defeat to Portugal on 28 March 2021.

== Style of play ==
Tanganga is a versatile defender, comfortable both as a central defender and as a right back. He describes his approach as "aggressive," saying that "great players their talent can really hurt you. So my strategy is to make sure I get after him. Don't give him any time, don't give him the opportunity to get the head up and pass because he has the quality to do that."

== Career statistics ==
As of match played 14 October 2026

Appearances and goals by club, season and competition
Club	Season	League			FA Cup		League Cup		Europe		Other		Total	
Club	Season	Division	Apps	Goals	Apps	Goals	Apps	Goals	Apps	Goals	Apps	Goals	Apps	Goals
Tottenham Hotspur U23	2017–18	—	—		—		—		—		2 (Note: Appearances in EFL Trophy)	0	2	0
Tottenham Hotspur U23	2018–19	—	—		—		—		—		3	0	3	0
Tottenham Hotspur U23	Total		—		—		—		—		5	0	5	0
Tottenham Hotspur	2019–20	Premier League	6	0	3	0	1	0	1 (Note: Appearance in UEFA Champions League)	0	—		11	0
Tottenham Hotspur	2020–21	Premier League	6	0	2	0	2	0	3 (Note: Appearances in UEFA Europa League)	0	—		13	0
Tottenham Hotspur	2021–22	Premier League	11	0	1	0	4	0	3 (Note: Appearances in UEFA Europa Conference League)	0	—		19	0
Tottenham Hotspur	2022–23	Premier League	4	0	2	0	0	0	1	0	—		7	0
Tottenham Hotspur	2023–24	Premier League	0	0	0	0	0	0	0	0	—		0	0
Tottenham Hotspur	Total		27	0	8	0	7	0	8	0	—		50	0
FC Augsburg (loan)	2023–24	Bundesliga	0	0	0	0	0	0	—		—		0	0
Millwall (loan)	2023–24	Championship	18	2	0	0	0	0	—		—		18	2
Millwall	2024–25	Championship	40	2	3	0	0	0	—		—		43	2
Millwall	2025–26	Championship	2	0	0	0	0	0	—		—		2	0
Millwall	Millwall total		60	4	3	0	0	0	0	0	0	0	63	4
Sheffield United	2025–26	Championship	40	1	0	0	0	0	—		0	0	40	1
Sheffield United	2026–27	Championship	10	2	0	0	1	0	—		0	0	11	2
Sheffield United	Total		50	3	0	0	1	0	0	0	0	0	51	3
Career total			137	7	11	0	8	0	8	0	5	0	169	7

== Honours ==
Tottenham Hotspur

- EFL Cup runner-up: 2020–21

England U20

- Toulon Tournament: 2017

Individual

- Millwall Player of the Year: 2024–25
