= 2024–25 Millwall F.C. season =

140th season in existence of Millwall FC

Millwall
2024–25 season
- Owner: Millwall Holdings
- Chairman: James Berylson
- Head coach: Neil Harris (until 15 December); David Livermore (interim basis); Alex Neil (from 30 December)
- Stadium: The Den
- Championship: 8th
- FA Cup: Fifth round
- EFL Cup: Second round
- Top goalscorer: League: Mihailo Ivanovic (12); All: Mihailo Ivanovic (13)
- Highest home attendance: 18,385 (v. Sunderland, Championship, 23 November 2024)
- Lowest home attendance: 5,625 (v. Dagenham & Redbridge, FA Cup, 13 January 2025)
- Average home league attendance: 15,490
- Biggest win: 3-0 (v. Sheffield Wednesday, Championship, 31 August 2024
- Biggest defeat: 5-1 (v. Plymouth Argyle, Championship, 12 February 2025)
Home colours	Away colours

The 2024–25 season was the 140th season in the history of Millwall Football Club and their eighth consecutive season in the Championship. In addition to the domestic league, the club also participated in the FA Cup and the EFL Cup.

== Current squad ==
As of 2 February 2025

Note: Flags indicate national team as has been defined under FIFA eligibility rules. Players may hold more than one non-FIFA nationality.

No.	Nationality	Name	Position	Place of Birth	Date of Birth (Age)	Apps.	Goals	Signed From	Date Signed	Transfer Fee	Contract End
Goalkeepers
1	(Denmark)	Lukas Jensen	GK	Helsingør	18 March 1999 (age 27)	6	0	(England) Lincoln City	11 July 2024	Undisclosed	30 June 2028
13	(England)	Liam Roberts	GK	Walsall	21 November 1994 (age 31)	2	0	(England) Barnsley	22 July 2024	Free Transfer	30 June 2028
27	(England)	Connal Trueman	GK	Birmingham	26 March 1996 (age 30)	0	0	(England) Birmingham City	4 August 2022	Free Transfer	30 June 2025
Defenders
2	(Republic of Ireland) (England)	Danny McNamara	RB	Sidcup	27 December 1998 (age 27)	138	2	Academy	2018	Trainee	30 June 2027
3	(Scotland)	Murray Wallace	LB/CB	Glasgow	10 January 1993 (age 33)	215	13	(England) Scunthorpe United	2018	£500,000	30 June 2025
4	(England)	Shaun Hutchinson	CB	Newcastle upon Tyne	23 November 1990 (age 35)	262	14	(England) Fulham	2016	Free Transfer	30 June 2025
5	(England)	Jake Cooper	CB	Bracknell	3 February 1995 (age 31)	353	27	(England) Reading	2017	Undisclosed	30 June 2026
6	(England)	Japhet Tanganga	CB	Hackney	31 March 1999 (age 27)	22	2	(England) Tottenham Hotspur	10 July 2024	Free Transfer	30 June 2028
15	(England)	Joe Bryan	LB	Bristol	17 September 1993 (age 33)	33	2	(England) Fulham	1 July 2023	Free Transfer	30 June 2027
33	(England)	Calum Scanlon	LB	Birmingham	14 February 2005 (age 21)	1	0	(England) Birmingham	29 August 2024	Loan	30 June 2025
45	(Jamaica) (England)	Wes Harding	RB/CB	Leicester	20 October 1996 (age 30)	27	3	(England) Rotherham United	21 July 2023	Free Transfer	30 June 2026
	(England)	Zak Sturge	LB	London	15 June 2004 (age 22)	0	0	(England) Chelsea	4 February 2025	Loan	30 June 2025
Midfielders
8	(England)	Billy Mitchell	CM/CDM	Orpington	7 April 2001 (age 25)	144	1	Academy	2019	Trainee	30 June 2025
14	(England)	Ryan Wintle	CM/CDM	Newcastle-under-Lyme	13 June 1997 (age 29)	2	0	(England) Cardiff	28 August 2024	Loan	30 June 2025
16	(Scotland)	Daniel Kelly	CM	East Renfrewshire	3 October 2005 (age 21)	1	0	(Scotland) Celtic	23 August 2024	Undisclosed	30 June 2028
18	(England)	Ryan Leonard	CM/CDM/CB/RB	Plympton	24 May 1992 (age 34)	167	5	(England) Sheffield United	2 January 2019	£1,250,000	30 June 2026
23	(Northern Ireland)	George Saville	CM/CAM	Camberley	1 June 1993 (age 33)	200	17	(England) Middlesbrough	2 July 2021	£600,000	30 June 2026
24	(Belgium)	Casper de Norre	CM	Hasselt	7 February 1997 (age 29)	40	1	(Belgium) Oud-Heverlee Leuven	21 July 2023	Undisclosed	30 June 2027
39	(England)	George Honeyman	CM/CAM/RW	Prudhoe	8 September 1994 (age 32)	80	1	(England) Hull City	2022	Undisclosed	30 June 2025
44	(England)	Alfie Massey	CM	London	18 January 2006 (age 20)	2	0	Academy	1 July 2024	Trainee	
Forwards
7	(Scotland)	Kevin Nisbet	CF	Glasgow	8 March 1997 (age 29)	30	5	(Scotland) Hibernian	14 June 2023	Undisclosed	30 June 2026
9	(Wales)	Tom Bradshaw	CF	Shrewsbury	27 July 1992 (age 34)	203	45	(England) Barnsley	2019	£1,000,000	30 June 2025
11	(England)	Femi Azeez	FW	Westminster	5 June 2001 (age 25)	5	0	(England) Reading	August 2024	Undisclosed	30 June 2028
12	(England)	Adam Mayor	LW	Liverpool	10 April 2005 (age 21)	4	0	(England) Morecambe	31 January 2024	Undisclosed	30 June 2027
17	(England)	Macaulay Langstaff	CF	Stockton-on-Tees	3 February 1997 (age 29)	8	0	(England) Notts County	8 July 2024	Undisclosed	30 June 2028
19	(England)	Duncan Watmore	CF/RW	Manchester	8 March 1994 (aged 29)	59	12	(England) Middlesbrough	2023	Undisclosed	30 June 2025
21	(England)	Josh Coburn	CF	Bedale	6 December 2002 (age 23)	2	1	(England) Middlesbrough	30 August 2024	Loan	30 June 2025
22	(Republic of Ireland)	Aidomo Emakhu	LW/CF/RW	Bawnogue	26 October 2003 (age 23)	29	1	(Republic of Ireland) Shamrock Rovers	2022	Undisclosed	30 June 2028
26	(Serbia)	Mihailo Ivanović	CF	Novi Sad	29 November 2004 (age 21)	1	0	(Serbia) Vojvodina	30 August 2024	Undisclosed	30 June 2028
Out on Loan
43	(England)	Kamarl Grant	CB		26 January 2003 (age 23)	0	0	(England) Sheffield United	1 July 2022	Free Transfer	30 June 2026

Note: Appearances and goals statistics are for all competitions taken from.

== Transfers ==
=== In ===
Date	Pos.	Player	From	Fee	Ref.
8 July 2024	CF	(England) Macaulay Langstaff	(England) Notts County	Undisclosed	
10 July 2024	CB	(England) Japhet Tanganga	(England) Tottenham Hotspur	Free	
11 July 2024	GK	(Denmark) Lukas Jensen	(England) Lincoln City	Undisclosed	
22 July 2024	GK	(England) Liam Roberts	(England) Middlesbrough	Free	
2 August 2024	CB	(England) Ben Drake (Note: Signed initially for the Under-21s)	(England) Sheffield United	Free	
21 August 2024	RW	(England) Femi Azeez	(England) Reading	Undisclosed	
23 August 2024	CM	(Scotland) Daniel Kelly	(Scotland) Celtic	Undisclosed	
23 August 2024	CM	(England) Rafiq Lamptey	(England) Harrow Borough	Free	
30 August 2024	CF	(Serbia) Mihailo Ivanović	(Serbia) Vojvodina	Undisclosed	
16 January 2025	CF	(Republic of Ireland) Aaron Connolly	(England) Sunderland	Free	
17 January 2025	CB	(France) Tristan Crama	(England) Brentford	Undisclosed	
30 January 2025	CF	(England) Ajay Matthews	(England) Middlesbrough	Undisclosed	
31 January 2025	CM	(England) Luke Cundle	(England) Wolverhampton Wanderers	Undisclosed	
31 January 2025	RW	(Algeria) Camiel Neghli	(Netherlands) Sparta Rotterdam	Undisclosed	
3 February 2025	LW	(England) Benicio Baker-Boaitey	(England) Brighton & Hove Albion	Undisclosed	
3 February 2025	CF	(England) Zak Lovelace	(Scotland) Rangers	Undisclosed	

=== Out ===
Date	Pos.	Player	To	Fee	Ref.
24 June 2024	CB	(England) Alex Mitchell	(England) Charlton Athletic	Undisclosed	
16 January 2025	CF	(Wales) Tom Bradshaw	(England) Oxford United	Undisclosed	
18 January 2025	AM	(England) Romain Esse	(England) Crystal Palace	Undisclosed	
3 February 2025	GK	(England) Connal Trueman	(England) Milton Keynes Dons	Free	

=== Loaned in ===
Date	Pos.	Player	From	Date until	Ref.
28 August 2024	DM	(England) Ryan Wintle	(Wales) Cardiff City	End of Season	
29 August 2024	LB	(England) Calum Scanlon	(England) Liverpool	End of Season	
30 August 2024	CF	(England) Josh Coburn	(England) Middlesbrough	End of Season	
3 February 2025	LB	(England) Zak Sturge	(England) Chelsea	End of Season	

=== Loaned out ===
Date	Pos.	Player	To	Date until	Ref.
19 July 2024	CB	(England) Kamarl Grant	(England) Bromley	End of Season (Note: On 16 January, Grant's loan at Bromley was extended until the end of season)	
24 August 2024	CF	(Scotland) Kevin Nisbet	(Scotland) Aberdeen	End of Season	
30 August 2024	AM	(Netherlands) Zian Flemming	(England) Burnley	End of Season	
6 September 2024	CF	(England) Tom Leahy	(England) Woking	1 January 2025	
10 September 2024	CB	(England) Chinwike Okoli	(England) Sutton United	7 January 2025	
21 September 2024	CM	(England) Sha'mar Lawson	(England) Ebbsfleet United	1 January 2025	
7 October 2024	GK	(England) Connal Trueman	(England) Crawley Town	14 October 2024	
5 November 2024	GK	(England) Connal Trueman	(England) Crawley Town	18 November 2024 (Note: On 11 November, Trueman's loan at Crawley was extended by a further seven days)	
12 November 2024	GK	(England) Dillon Addai	(England) Ramsgate	19 November 2024	
16 November 2024	CF	(England) Henry Hearn	(England) Hornchurch	9 February 2025 (Note: On 13 December, Hearn's loan at Hornchurch was extended for a further 28 days Then on 8 January the loan was extended again for a further month)	
14 December 2024	GK	(England) Dillon Addai	(England) Chesham United	4 March 2025 (Note: On 8 January, Addai's loan at Chesham was extended for a further month, Then on 17 February, it was extended again for a further month, but he was later recalled early on March 3)	
6 January 2025	GK	(England) George Evans	(England) Sutton United	3 February 2025	
24 January 2025	CB	(England) Chinwike Okoli	(England) Woking	End of Season	
31 January 2025	LW	(England) Adam Mayor	(England) Bromley	End of Season	
21 February 2025	CF	(England) Tom Leahy	(England) Maidstone United	End of Season	
20 March 2025	CM	(England) Sha'mar Lawson	(England) Woking	End of Season	
24 March 2025	CF	(England) Kavalli Heywood	(England) Cray Wanderers	End of Season	

=== Released / Out of Contract ===
Date	Pos.	Player	Subsequent club	Join date	Ref.
30 June 2024	CF	(England) Nana Boateng	(England) Sutton United	1 July 2024	
30 June 2024	CB	(England) Frankie Hvid	(Northern Ireland) Glentoran	18 July 2024	
30 June 2024	LB	(England) Zane Myers	(England) Hull City	21 August 2024	
30 June 2024	CF	(England) Abdul Abdulmalik	(England) Boreham Wood	19 July 2024	
30 June 2024	GK	(Poland) Bartosz Białkowski	Retired		
30 June 2024	CM	(England) Finley Cotton			
30 June 2024	RW	(England) Seb Drozd	(Scotland) Queen's Park	8 October 2024	
30 June 2024	AM	(Algeria) Arezki Hamouchene			
30 June 2024	CB	(Jamaica) Kyron Horsley-McKay			
30 June 2024	CM	(England) Frankie Maciocia			
30 June 2024	CM	(England) Christopher Ojemen			
30 June 2024	LB	(England) Adedapo Olugbodi			
30 June 2024	GK	(England) Albert Penney			
30 June 2024	CM	(England) George Walker			

== Pre-season and friendlies ==
On 5 June, Millwall announced their first pre-season friendly, against Gillingham. Three weeks later, a warm weather training camp in Spain was confirmed, with matches against Nottingham Forest and Real Murcia. On July 4, the club then confirmed its full pre-season schedule with additional friendlies against Bromley, Charlton Athletic, Reading, Colchester United and Southampton added.

Win Draw Loss Fixtures

13 July 2024 Friendly	Gillingham	0–0	Millwall	Gillingham
13:00 BST		Report		Stadium: Priestfield Stadium; Attendance: 4,442; Referee: Carl Brook

16 July 2024 Friendly	Millwall	2–0	Charlton Athletic	Bromley
13:00 BST	Saville 10'; Emakhu 80'	Report		Stadium: Calmont Road; Attendance: 0 (behind-closed-doors)

19 July 2024 Friendly	Reading	1–2	Millwall	Wokingham
12:00 BST		Report	Esse; Flemming	Stadium: Bearwood Park; Attendance: 0 (behind-closed-doors)

23 July 2024 Friendly	Nottingham Forest	2–1	Millwall	San Pedro del Pinatar, Spain
20:00 CEST (19:00 BST)	Wood 16'; Hudson-Odoi 53'	Report	Emakhu 76'	Stadium: Pinatar Arena; Referee: Campos Salinas
Note: Fixture was initially scheduled for a 19:00 CEST kick-off time, but was moved due to the local weather temperature in Murcia.

26 July 2024 Friendly	Real Murcia	1–2	Millwall	San Pedro del Pinatar, Spain
10:30 CEST (09:30 BST)	Carrillo 81'	Report	Bradshaw 36'; Leahy 87'	Stadium: Pinatar Arena; Referee: Clemente Ortuno

3 August 2024 Friendly	Millwall	0–1	Southampton	Bermondsey
13:00 BST		Report	Armstrong 64'	Stadium: The Den; Referee: Gavin Ward

== Competitions ==
=== Championship ===
==== League table ====
Pos	Team	Pld	W	D	L	GF	GA	GD	Pts	Promotion, qualification or relegation
6	Bristol City	46	17	17	12	59	55	+4	68	Qualified for the Championship play-offs
7	Blackburn Rovers	46	19	9	18	53	48	+5	66	
8	Millwall	46	18	12	16	47	49	−2	66	
9	West Bromwich Albion	46	15	19	12	57	47	+10	64	
10	Middlesbrough	46	18	10	18	64	56	+8	64	

Source: English Football League
Rules for classification: 1) Points; 2) Goal difference; 3) Number of goals scored; 4) Head-to-head results; 5) Wins; 6) Away goals; 7) Penalty points (sec 9.5); 8) Number of 12-point sending off offences; 9) Play-off (only if needed to determine promotion/relegation)

==== Results summary ====
Overall								Home						Away					
Pld	W	D	L	GF	GA	GD	Pts	W	D	L	GF	GA	GD	W	D	L	GF	GA	GD
46	18	12	16	47	49	−2	66	12	4	7	27	19	+8	6	8	9	20	30	−10

Last updated: 21 April 2025.
Source: Soccerway

==== Results by round ====
Round	1	2	3	4	5	6	7	8	9	10	11	12	13	14	15	16	18	19	20	21	22	23	24	25	26	27	28	29	17^{1}	30	32	33	31^{2}	34	35	36	37	38	39	40	41	42	43	44	45	46
Ground	H	A	A	H	H	A	H	A	A	H	H	A	H	H	A	H	A	H	H	A	H	A	A	H	A	H	H	A	A	H	A	H	A	A	H	A	A	H	A	H	A	H	A	H	H	A
Result	L	L	D	W	L	D	W	L	D	D	W	W	W	W	D	D	D	L	L	L	W	L	D	L	D	L	D	W	W	W	L	D	D	W	L	W	L	W	L	W	W	W	L	W	W	L
Position	15	22	22	15	18	18	15	16	18	20	13	10	7	7	8	8	10	11	13	13	10	13	13	13	13	17	17	16	14	13	14	14	14	11	12	12	13	11	13	9	9	9	9	8	7	8
Points	0	0	1	4	4	5	8	8	9	10	13	16	19	22	23	24	25	25	25	25	28	28	29	29	30	30	31	34	37	40	40	41	42	45	45	48	48	51	51	54	57	60	60	63	66	66

Source: EFL
A = Away; H = Home; W = Win; D = Draw; L = Loss; P = Postponed
Notes:
- ^{1} Matchday 17 (vs. Portsmouth) was postponed due to power failure in the local area
- ^{2} Matchday 31 (vs. Preston North End) was postponed due to FA Cup involvements

==== Matches ====
On 26 June, the Championship fixtures were announced.

Win Draw Loss Fixtures

10 August 2024 1	Millwall	2–3	Watford	Bermondsey
12:30 BST	Leonard (yellow card) 55'; Watmore 74', 88'; Bryan (yellow card) 86'	Report	Sierralta (yellow card) 7'; Kayembe 22', (yellow card) 86'; Chakvetadze 55'; Rajović 90', (yellow card) 90'	Stadium: The Den; Attendance: 16,456; Referee: John Busby

17 August 2024 2	Bristol City	4–3	Millwall	Bristol
15:00 BST	Mehmeti 3'; Armstrong 12'; Sykes (yellow card) 50'; Mayulu 78'; Twine 88'	Report	De Norre (yellow card) 49'; Esse 51'; Bradshaw 54' (pen.); Watmore 64'; Jensen (yellow card) 67'	Stadium: Ashton Gate; Attendance: 20,733; Referee: Sunny Singh Gill

24 August 2024 3	Hull City	0–0	Millwall	Kingston upon Hull
12:30 BST	Mehlem (yellow card) 65'; Coyle (yellow card) 71'	Report	Tanganga (yellow card) 51'; Saville (yellow card) 63'	Stadium: MKM Stadium; Attendance: 20,009; Referee: David Webb
Note: Fixture was initially scheduled for a 15:00 kick-off, but was moved for live Sky Sports broadcast.

31 August 2024 4	Millwall	3–0	Sheffield Wednesday	Bermondsey
15:00 BST	Tanganga (yellow card) 43'; Coburn 58'; Watmore 71'; Esse (yellow card) 82'; Cooper 88'	Report	Bannan (yellow card) 60'	Stadium: The Den; Attendance: 14,905; Referee: Leigh Doughty

14 September 2024 5	Millwall	0–1	Luton Town	Bermondsey
12:30 BST	De Norre (yellow card) 22'; Hutchinson (yellow card) 90+4'	Report	Mengi 10', (yellow card) 41'; Kaminski (yellow card) 85'; Doughty (yellow card) 89'	Stadium: The Den; Attendance: 14,804; Referee: Josh Smith
Note: Fixture was initially scheduled for a 15:00 kick-off, but was moved for live Sky Sports broadcast.

21 September 2024 6	Queens Park Rangers	1–1	Millwall	Shepherd's Bush
12:30 BST	Frey 40'; Paal (yellow card) 60'; Varane (yellow card) 84'	Report	Watmore 34'; Saville (yellow card) 86'	Stadium: Loftus Road; Attendance: 15,350; Referee: John Busby
Note: Fixture was initially scheduled for a 15:00 kick-off, but was moved for live Sky Sports broadcast.

28 September 2024 7	Millwall	3–1	Preston North End	Bermondsey
15:00 BST	Honeyman 24', (yellow card) 39'; Esse 38'; Langstaff 47'; Bryan (yellow card) 86'; Emakhu (yellow card) 89', (red card) 89'	Report	Holmes (yellow card) 42'; McCann (yellow card) 77'; Storey 87'	Stadium: The Den; Attendance: 13,674; Referee: Darren Bond

1 October 2024 8	Cardiff City	1–0	Millwall	Cardiff
19:45 BST	Chambers (yellow card) 26'; Ng 39'	Report	De Norre (yellow card) 64'; Cooper (yellow card) 87'; Leonard (yellow card) 90+1'	Stadium: Cardiff City Stadium; Attendance: 15,687; Referee: Gavin Ward

5 October 2024 9	West Bromwich Albion	0–0	Millwall	West Bromwich
15:00 BST	Ajayi (yellow card) 20'; Johnston (yellow card) 55'	Report	Honeyman (yellow card) 70'; Ivanović (yellow card) 71'; Leonard (yellow card) 75'	Stadium: The Hawthorns; Attendance: 24,158; Referee: Will Finnie

19 October 2024 10	Millwall	1–1	Derby County	Bermondsey
15:00 BST	Bryan (yellow card) 37'; Ivanović 85'; Wintle (yellow card) 90'	Report	Yates 78'	Stadium: The Den; Attendance: 17,321; Referee: Stuart Attwell

23 October 2024 11	Millwall	1–0	Plymouth Argyle	Bermondsey
19:45 GMT	Honeyman (yellow card) 8'; Esse 13'; Azeez (yellow card) 45+1'; Saville (yellow card) 59'; Cooper (yellow card) 76'; Bryan (yellow card) 84'	Report	Szűcs (yellow card) 63'	Stadium: The Den; Attendance: 13,954; Referee: Sam Allison

26 October 2024 12	Swansea City	0–1	Millwall	Landore
15:00 BST	Cullen (yellow card) 60'	Report	Wintle (yellow card) 40'; Esse (yellow card) 41'; Leonard (yellow card) 89'; De Norre 90'; Ivanović (yellow card) 90+3'	Stadium: Swansea.com Stadium; Attendance: 15,119; Referee: John Busby

3 November 2024 13	Millwall	1–0	Burnley	Bermondsey
13:00 GMT	Cooper (yellow card) 21', (goal) 52'; Bryan (yellow card) 23'	Report	Sarmiento (yellow card) 88'; Mejbri (yellow card) 90+7'	Stadium: The Den; Attendance: 14,245; Referee: Gavin Ward
Note: Fixture was initially scheduled for 2 November, but was moved for live Sky Sports broadcast.

6 November 2024 14	Millwall	1–0	Leeds United	Bermondsey
19:45 GMT	Tanganga 40', (yellow card) 57'; Honeyman (yellow card) 64'	Report	Firpo (yellow card) 87'	Stadium: The Den; Attendance: 16,693; Referee: Leigh Doughty
Note: Fixture was initially scheduled for 5 November, but was moved due to Millwall playing the Sunday prior.

9 November 2024 15	Stoke City	1–1	Millwall	Stoke on Trent
12:30 GMT	Gibson (yellow card) 45+3', (goal) 60'; Burger (yellow card) 50'	Report	Coburn 42'; Esse (yellow card) 53'; Wintle (yellow card) 84'	Stadium: Bet365 Stadium; Attendance: 21,060; Referee: Will Finnie
Note: Fixture was initially scheduled for a 15:00 kick-off, but was moved for live Sky Sports broadcast.

23 November 2024 16	Millwall	1–1	Sunderland	Bermondsey
15:00 GMT	Esse (yellow card) 86'; Azeez 90+3'	Report	Connolly 10'; Aleksić (yellow card) 77'; Mepham (yellow card) 87'	Stadium: The Den; Attendance: 18,385; Referee: John Busby

30 November 2024 18	Oxford United	1–1	Millwall	Oxford
12:30 GMT	Goodrham 85'	Report	Tanganga (yellow card) 3', (goal) 45'; Leonard (yellow card) 59'; Bryan (yellow card) 64'; Saville (yellow card) 90+1'	Stadium: Kassam Stadium; Attendance: 10,990; Referee: Anthony Backhouse
Note: Fixture was initially scheduled for a 15:00 kick-off, but was moved for live Sky Sports broadcast.

7 December 2024 19	Millwall	0–1	Coventry City	Bermondsey
15:00 GMT	Leonard (yellow card) 51'; McNamara (yellow card) 82'	Report	Bidwell (yellow card) 50'; Mason-Clark 63'	Stadium: The Den; Attendance: 16,460; Referee: Thomas Bramall

11 December 2024 20	Millwall	0–1	Sheffield United	Bermondsey
19:45 GMT		Report	Brewster 42'; Robinson (yellow card) 84'; Gilchrist (yellow card) 90+5'	Stadium: The Den; Attendance: 12,734; Referee: Matt Donohue
Note: Fixture was initially scheduled for 10 December, but was moved due to Sheffield United playing the Sunday prior.

14 December 2024 21	Middlesbrough	1–0	Millwall	Middlesbrough
15:00 GMT	Latte Lath 10', (yellow card) 37'; Dijksteel (yellow card) 65'	Report	Tanganga (yellow card) 54'; Mitchell (yellow card) 90'	Stadium: Riverside Stadium; Attendance: 23,445; Referee: Geoff Eltringham

21 December 2024 22	Millwall	1–0	Blackburn Rovers	Bermondsey
15:00 GMT	Ivanović 90+6'	Report	Travis (yellow card) 6'; Gueye (yellow card) 90+1'	Stadium: The Den; Attendance: 14,009; Referee: David Webb

26 December 2024 23	Norwich City	2–1	Millwall	Norwich
15:00 GMT	Marcondes 4'; Schwartau 39', (yellow card) 82'; Ben Slimane (yellow card) 62'	Report	Leonard (yellow card) 52'; Esse 65'	Stadium: Carrow Road; Attendance: 26,060; Referee: Tom Nield

29 December 2024 24	Coventry City	0–0	Millwall	Coventry
15:00 GMT		Report	De Norre (yellow card) 85'	Stadium: Coventry Building Society Arena; Attendance: 28,216; Referee: Andrew Kitchen

1 January 2025 25	Millwall	0–1	Oxford United	Bermondsey
13:00 GMT		Report	Rodrigues 57'; Brannagan (yellow card) 64'	Stadium: The Den; Attendance: 14,964; Referee: Ruebyn Ricardo
Note: Fixture was initially scheduled for a 15:00 kick-off, but was moved following an agreement between all parties.

4 January 2025 26	Sheffield Wednesday	2–2	Millwall	Owlerton
15:00 GMT	Valery 6'; Ubgo (penalty missed) 42'; Bannan (yellow card) 64'; Otegbayo 85'	Report	Leonard (yellow card) 23'; Azeez (yellow card) 60'; Saville (yellow card) 62'; Honeyman 65'; Wintle 83'	Stadium: Hillsborough Stadium; Attendance: 25,208; Referee: Robert Jones

18 January 2025 27	Millwall	0–1	Hull City	Bermondsey
12:30 GMT	Honeyman (yellow card) 81'	Report	Cooper 58' (o.g.); Gelhardt (yellow card) 90+4'	Stadium: The Den; Attendance: 14,579; Referee: Stephen Martin
Note: Fixture was initially scheduled for a 15:00 kick-off, but was moved for live Sky Sports broadcasting.

21 January 2025 28	Millwall	2–2	Cardiff City	Bermondsey
20:00 GMT	Scanlon 2'; De Norre 19'	Report	Willock 45+1'; Salech 90+7'	Stadium: The Den; Attendance: 12,041; Referee: David Webb
Note: Fixture was initially scheduled for a 19:45 kick-off, but was moved for live Sky Sports broadcasting.

25 January 2025 29	Luton Town	0–1	Millwall	Luton
12:30 GMT	Andersen (yellow card) 74'; Walsh (yellow card) 90+8'	Report	Connolly (penalty missed) 34'; Ivanović 61'; Saville (yellow card) 71'; Cooper (yellow card) 74'; Honeyman (yellow card) 88'; Tanganga (yellow card) 90+7'	Stadium: Kenilworth Road; Attendance: 11,418; Referee: Gavin Ward
Note: Fixture was initially scheduled for a 15:00 kick-off, but was moved for live Sky Sports broadcasting.

28 January 2025 17	Portsmouth	0–1	Millwall	Milton
19:45 GMT		Report	Ivanović 40'; Bangura-Williams (yellow card) 53'; Connolly (yellow card) 62'	Stadium: Fratton Park; Attendance: 19,815; Referee: Dean Whitestone
Note: Fixture was originally scheduled for 27 November, but was postponed due to power failure in the local area.

1 February 2025 30	Millwall	2–1	Queens Park Rangers	Bermondsey
15:00 GMT	Connolly 1'; Cundle 25'; Saville (yellow card) 75'	Report	Lloyd 3', (yellow card) 74'; Morgan (yellow card) 59'	Stadium: The Den; Attendance: 17,914; Referee: John Busby

12 February 2025 32	Plymouth Argyle	5–1	Millwall	Plymouth
19:45 GMT	Bryan 6' (o.g.); Hardie 10' (pen.), 56'; Randell (yellow card) 40'; Bundu 53'; Katić 86'	Report	Bryan 80'	Stadium: Home Park; Attendance: 15,453; Referee: Jeremy Simpson
Note: Fixture was originally scheduled for 11 February, but was pushed back a day due to Plymouth also playing on the preceding Sunday.

15 February 2025 33	Millwall	1–1	West Bromwich Albion	Bermondsey
15:00 GMT	Cooper 19'; Saville (yellow card) 90+2'	Report	Byran 26' (o.g.); Dike (yellow card) 82'; Molumby (yellow card) 89'	Stadium: The Den; Attendance: 15,842; Referee: James Bell

18 February 2025 31	Preston North End	1–1	Millwall	Preston
19:45 GMT	Riis Jakobsen 47'	Report	Ivanović 40'; Bangura-Williams (yellow card) 51'; Bryan (yellow card) 63'; Honeyman (yellow card) 90'; Crama (yellow card) 90+3'	Stadium: Deepdale; Attendance: 13,290; Referee: Matthew Donohue
Note: Fixture was initially scheduled for 8 February, but was postponed due to FA Cup involvements

22 February 2025 34	Derby County	0–1	Millwall	Derby
12:30 GMT	Goudmijn (yellow card) 44'; Nyambe (yellow card) 54'	Report	Coburn (penalty missed) 83' , 90+5'	Stadium: Pride Park Stadium; Attendance: 28,321; Referee: Elliot Bell
Note: Fixture was initially scheduled for a 15:00 kick-off, but was moved for live Sky Sports broadcasting.

4 March 2025 35	Millwall	0–2	Bristol City	Bermondsey
19:45 GMT		Report	Vyner 53'; Cornick 83'	Stadium: The Den; Attendance: 12,380; Referee: Matthew Donohue
Note: Fixture was initially scheduled for 1 March, but was rearranged due to FA Cup involvements.

8 March 2025 36	Watford	1–2	Millwall	Watford
12:30 GMT	Pollock 30'	Report	Cundle (yellow card) 50'; De Norre 59'; Coburn 81'	Stadium: Vicarage Road; Attendance: 20,031; Referee: Gavin Ward
Note: Fixture was initially scheduled for a 15:00 kick-off, but was moved for live Sky Sports broadcasting.

12 March 2025 37	Leeds United	2–0	Millwall	Leeds
19:45 GMT	Cooper 3' (o.g.); Tanaka 85'	Report		Stadium: Elland Road; Attendance: 34,401; Referee: Dean Whitestone

15 March 2025 38	Millwall	1–0	Stoke City	Bermondsey
12:30 GMT	Emakhu (yellow card) 30'; Connolly (yellow card) 76'; Ivanović 90+4' (pen.)	Report	Koumas (yellow card) 63'; Tchamadeu (yellow card) 76'; Wilmot (yellow card) 90+2'; Burger (yellow card) 90+3'; Thompson (yellow card) 90+3'	Stadium: The Den; Attendance: 16,799; Referee: Andy Davies
Note: Fixture was initially scheduled for a 15:00 kick-off, but was moved for live Sky Sports broadcasting.

29 March 2025 39	Sunderland	1–0	Millwall	Sunderland
15:00 GMT	Bellingham (yellow card) 13'; Hume 20'; Mepham (yellow card) 26'; Isidor (yellow card) 69'; Watson (yellow card) 90+4'	Report	Emakhu (yellow card) 36'; Connolly (yellow card) 44'; De Norre (yellow card) 73'	Stadium: Stadium of Light; Attendance: 41,762; Referee: Bobby Madley

5 April 2025 40	Millwall	2–1	Portsmouth	Bermondsey
15:00 BST	Ivanović 57', 87'	Report	Devlin (yellow card) 29'; Bishop (yellow card) 59'; Ritchie (yellow card) 67'; Dozzell 80'; Pack (yellow card) 90+1'	Stadium: The Den; Attendance: 16,913; Referee: Ben Toner

8 April 2025 41	Sheffield United	0–1	Millwall	Sheffield
19:45 BST		Report	Coburn 21'; Bryan (yellow card) 45+1'	Stadium: Bramall Lane; Attendance: 25,775; Referee: Sam Allison

12 April 2025 42	Millwall	1–0	Middlesbrough	Bermondsey
15:00 BST	Neghli 65'; Azeez (yellow card) 88'	Report		Stadium: The Den; Attendance: 17,523; Referee: Tom Nield

18 April 2025 43	Blackburn Rovers	4–1	Millwall	Blackburn
15:00 BST	Hyam 42'; Tronstad 45+1', 59'; Brittain 50'	Report	Ivanović 44'; Harding (yellow card) 45+1'	Stadium: Ewood Park; Attendance: 14,167; Referee: Lewis Smith

21 April 2025 44	Millwall	3–1	Norwich City	Bermondsey
15:00 BST	Ivanović 8', 69'; Azeez 39'; Cundle (yellow card) 71'	Report	Duffy 45+4'; Núñez (yellow card) 61'; McLean (yellow card) 79'; Hernández (yellow card) 89'	Stadium: The Den; Attendance: 16,426; Referee: Elliot Bell

26 April 2025 45	Millwall	1–0	Swansea City	Bermondsey
15:00 BST	Saville 38'; Azeez (yellow card) 63'	Report	Eom Ji-sung (yellow card) 32'	Stadium: The Den; Attendance: 17,239; Referee: Benjamin Speedie

3 May 2025 46	Burnley	3–1	Millwall	Burnley
12:30 BST	Brownhill 13', 90+3', (yellow card) 90+5'; Anthony 65'	Report	Ivanović 11'	Stadium: Turf Moor; Referee: Andrew Kitchen
Note: Fixture was initially scheduled for a 15:00 kick-off, but all EFL Championship final matchday fixtures were moved to an earlier kick-off.

=== FA Cup ===
Millwall entered the competition at the third round stage, and were drawn at home to Dagenham &Redbridge, then away to Leeds United in the fourth round and to Crystal Palace in the fifth round.

Win Draw Loss Fixtures

13 January 2025 Third round	Millwall	3–0	Dagenham & Redbridge	Bermondsey
19:30 GMT	Ivanović 30'; De Norre 70'; Bangura-Williams 85'	Report	Rees (yellow card) 15'	Stadium: The Den; Attendance: 5,625; Referee: Bobby Madley

8 February 2025 Fourth round	Leeds United	0–2	Millwall	Leeds
12:15 GMT	Guilavogui (yellow card) 39'; Struijk (penalty missed) 60'	Report	Azeez 30', 55'; Tanganga (yellow card) 86'; De Norre (yellow card) 90'	Stadium: Elland Road; Attendance: 34,923; Referee: Gavin Ward

1 March 2025 Fifth round	Crystal Palace	3–1	Millwall	Selhurst
12:15 GMT	Tanganga 33' (o.g.); Muñoz 40'; Nketiah 81'	Report	Roberts (red card) 8'; Bangura-Williams (yellow card) 45+6'; Harding 45+13'; Cooper (yellow card) 74'	Stadium: Selhurst Park; Attendance: 21,263; Referee: Michael Oliver

=== EFL Cup ===
On 27 June, the draw for the first round was made, with Millwall being drawn away against Portsmouth. In the second round, they were drawn at home to Leyton Orient.

Win Draw Loss Fixtures

13 August 2024 First round	Portsmouth	0–1	Millwall	Portsmouth
19:45 BST	Whyte (yellow card) 45'; Lang (yellow card) 86'	Report	Esse 13'; Roberts (yellow card) 81'	Stadium: Fratton Park; Attendance: 13,913; Referee: Dean Whitestone

27 August 2024 Second round	Millwall	0–1	Leyton Orient	Bermondsey
19:45 BST	Wallace (yellow card) 26'; McNamara (yellow card) 58'	Report	Agyei 14'; Pratley (yellow card) 25'; Jaiyesimi (yellow card) 65'; Sweeney (yellow card) 78'; O'Neill (yellow card) 82'	Stadium: The Den; Attendance: 5,875; Referee: David Rock

== Statistics ==
=== Appearances and goals ===
Players with no appearances are not included on the list

No.	Pos	Nat	Player	Total		Championship		FA Cup		EFL Cup	
No.	Pos	Nat	Player	Apps	Goals	Apps	Goals	Apps	Goals	Apps	Goals
1	GK	(Denmark) DEN	Lukas Jensen	43	0	41+0	0	1+1	0	0+0	0
2	DF	(Republic of Ireland) IRL	Danny McNamara	15	0	7+6	0	0+0	0	2+0	0
3	DF	(Scotland) SCO	Murray Wallace	12	0	8+3	0	0+0	0	1+0	0
4	DF	(England) ENG	Shaun Hutchinson	11	0	4+5	0	0+0	0	1+1	0
5	DF	(England) ENG	Jake Cooper	40	3	36+0	3	3+0	0	1+0	0
6	DF	(England) ENG	Japhet Tanganga	43	2	40+0	2	3+0	0	0+0	0
7	FW	(Scotland) SCO	Kevin Nisbet	1	0	0+1	0	0+0	0	0+0	0
8	MF	(England) ENG	Billy Mitchell	22	0	9+10	0	3+0	0	0+0	0
9	FW	(Republic of Ireland) IRL	Aaron Connolly	14	1	6+8	1	0+0	0	0+0	0
11	FW	(England) ENG	Femi Azeez	38	4	20+14	2	3+0	2	1+0	0
12	FW	(England) ENG	Adam Mayor	1	0	0+0	0	1+0	0	0+0	0
13	GK	(England) ENG	Liam Roberts	6	0	1+1	0	2+0	0	2+0	0
14	MF	(England) ENG	Ryan Wintle	23	1	3+19	1	0+1	0	0+0	0
15	DF	(England) ENG	Joe Bryan	44	1	37+2	1	3+0	0	2+0	0
16	MF	(Scotland) SCO	Daniel Kelly	4	0	0+2	0	0+1	0	1+0	0
17	FW	(England) ENG	Macaulay Langstaff	36	1	14+20	1	0+0	0	2+0	0
18	MF	(England) ENG	Ryan Leonard	36	0	29+4	0	1+0	0	0+2	0
19	FW	(England) ENG	Duncan Watmore	29	5	19+7	5	0+1	0	0+2	0
21	FW	(England) ENG	Josh Coburn	21	5	13+7	5	1+0	0	0+0	0
22	FW	(Republic of Ireland) IRL	Aidomo Emakhu	28	0	6+19	0	0+1	0	2+0	0
23	MF	(Northern Ireland) NIR	George Saville	49	1	36+9	1	0+2	0	1+1	0
24	MF	(Belgium) BEL	Casper De Norre	51	4	44+2	3	3+0	1	1+1	0
25	MF	(England) ENG	Luke Cundle	18	1	13+3	1	2+0	0	0+0	0
26	FW	(Serbia) SRB	Mihailo Ivanović	40	13	23+14	12	2+1	1	0+0	0
29	FW	(England) ENG	Tom Leahy	1	0	0+1	0	0+0	0	0+0	0
31	MF	(England) ENG	Raees Bangura-Williams	13	1	7+3	0	0+3	1	0+0	0
33	DF	(England) ENG	Calum Scanlon	4	1	3+1	1	0+0	0	0+0	0
39	MF	(England) ENG	George Honeyman	45	2	28+12	2	1+2	0	2+0	0
41	GK	(England) ENG	George Evans	4	0	4+0	0	0+0	0	0+0	0
44	MF	(England) ENG	Alfie Massey	2	0	0+0	0	0+1	0	1+0	0
45	DF	(Jamaica) JAM	Wes Harding	8	1	2+3	0	2+0	1	1+0	0
51	FW	(Guyana) GUY	Sheldon Kendall	1	0	0+0	0	0+1	0	0+0	0
52	DF	(France) FRA	Tristan Crama	20	0	18+2	0	0+0	0	0+0	0
56	FW	(Algeria) ALG	Camiel Neghli	6	1	2+2	1	2+0	0	0+0	0
58	DF	(England) ENG	Zak Sturge	5	0	3+2	0	0+0	0	0+0	0
Player(s) who featured but departed the club permanently during the season:
9	FW	(Wales) WAL	Tom Bradshaw	13	1	4+7	1	0+0	0	0+2	0
25	MF	(England) ENG	Romain Esse	26	5	24+0	4	0+0	0	1+1	1
