= Cameron Peupion =

Australian association footballer

Personal information
- Full name: Cameron Paul Jacques Peupion
- Date of birth: 23 September 2002 (age 24)
- Place of birth: Sydney, Australia
- Position: Winger

Team information
- Current team: ADO Den Haag
- Number: 21

Youth career
- Wakehurst FC
- Manly United
- 2015–2020: Sydney FC

Senior career*
Years	Team	Apps	(Gls)
2019–2020	Sydney FC NPL	4	(1)
2020–2025	Brighton & Hove Albion	1	(0)
2023	→ Cheltenham Town (loan)	6	(0)
2025–	ADO Den Haag	52	(7)

International career
2019	Australia U17	5	(0)
2022–2023	Australia U23	12	(1)
- * Club domestic league appearances and goals as of 24 October 2026

Cameron Paul Jacques Peupion (born 23 September 2002) is an Australian soccer player who plays as a winger for Eredivisie club ADO Den Haag.

== Club career ==
Peupion started his career with A-League club Sydney FC youth side Sydney FC Youth.

=== Brighton & Hove Albion ===
Peupion joined the youth academy of Premier League side Brighton & Hove Albion on 1 July 2020.

Peupion made his debut for Brighton on 24 August 2022, coming on as an 80th-minute substitute replacing fellow debutant Julio Enciso and assisting Evan Ferguson's first Albion goal in the 3–0 away win over League One side Forest Green Rovers in the EFL Cup second round.

He made his Premier League debut on 18 May 2023, coming on as a 85th-minute substitute in an eventual 4–1 away loss to Newcastle. He thanked his family for the fantastic reaction of his debut. The "kick-off was at 4.30am for them but they were all up watching," Peupion who is from Sydney. "To feel the support from the people I love back home was really special and I feel very lucky to have them all behind me from Australia," calling his debut "a dream come true" despite the result.

==== Loan to Cheltenham Town ====
On 29 August 2023, Peupion signed for League One club Cheltenham Town on a season-long loan deal. He returned to his parent club on 2 January 2024.

=== ADO Den Haag ===
On 31 January 2025, Peupion signed for Eerste Divisie club ADO Den Haag on a two-and-a-half year deal.

== International career ==
Peupion was born in Australia to a French father and an English mother. He represented Australia at the 2019 FIFA U-17 World Cup and at the 2022 AFC U-23 Asian Cup. He is also eligible to represent France or England internationally.

== Career statistics ==
As of match played 24 October 2026

Appearances and goals by club, season and competition
Club	Season	League			National cup (Note: Includes FA Cup)		Other		Total	
Club	Season	Division	Apps	Goals	Apps	Goals	Apps	Goals	Apps	Goals
Brighton & Hove Albion	2022–23	Premier League	1	0	1	0	—		2	0
Brighton & Hove Albion	2023–24	Premier League	0	0	2	0	0	0	2	0
Brighton & Hove Albion	2024–25	Premier League	0	0	1	0	0	0	1	0
Brighton & Hove Albion	Total		1	0	4	0	0	0	5	0
Brighton & Hove Albion U21s	2022–23	—			—		3 (Note: Appearance(s) in EFL Trophy)	0	3	0
Brighton & Hove Albion U21s	2023–24	—			—		1	0	1	0
Brighton & Hove Albion U21s	Total		—		—		4	0	4	0
Cheltenham Town (loan)	2023–24	League One	6	0	0	0	—		6	0
ADO Den Haag	2024–25	Eerste Divisie	15	0	0	0	2 (Note: Appearances in promotion play-offs)	0	17	0
ADO Den Haag	2025–26	Eerste Divisie	36	7	1	0	—		37	7
ADO Den Haag	2026–27	Eredivisie	1	0	1	0	—		2	0
ADO Den Haag	Total		52	7	2	0	2	0	56	7
Career total			59	7	6	0	6	0	71	7

== Honours ==
ADO Den Haag

- Eerste Divisie: 2025–26

Individual

- Premier League 2 Player of the Month: April 2023
