= Liam Roberts =

English footballer (born 1994)

Personal information
- Full name: Liam Joseph Roberts
- Date of birth: 21 November 1994 (age 31)
- Place of birth: Walsall, England
- Height: 1.83 m (6 ft 0 in)
- Position: Goalkeeper

Team information
- Current team: Mansfield Town
- Number: 1

Youth career
- –2012: Walsall

Senior career*
Years	Team	Apps	(Gls)
2012–2021	Walsall	131	(0)
2012–2013	→ Romulus (loan)	39	(0)
2014	→ Rushall Olympic (loan)	0	(0)
2014	→ Rainworth Miners Welfare (loan)	12	(0)
2014–2015	→ Southport (loan)	0	(0)
2015	→ Gresley (loan)	18	(0)
2015	→ Gresley (loan)	9	(0)
2015	→ Rugby Town (loan)	6	(0)
2016–2017	→ Chester (loan)	15	(0)
2021–2022	Northampton Town	46	(0)
2022–2024	Middlesbrough	4	(0)
2023–2024	→ Barnsley (loan)	38	(0)
2024–2025	Millwall	2	(0)
2025–	Mansfield Town	25	(0)
- * Club domestic league appearances and goals as of 26 January 2026

Liam Joseph Roberts (born 21 November 1994) is an English professional footballer who plays as a goalkeeper for EFL League One club Mansfield Town.

== Career ==
=== Walsall ===
Roberts began his career playing for Willenhall Town FC under manager Ian Boucher before joining Walsall's youth academy academy, to then go in to join Romulus on a work experience loan on 4 December 2012. He was released by Walsall on 7 May 2014. However, Roberts subsequently re-signed for the club on 22 July 2014 as cover for Richard O'Donnell and Craig MacGillivray.

Roberts was immediately sent out on loan to Rushall Olympic. His loan deal with the Pics was terminated early to allow him to join Rainworth Miners Welfare on 9 September 2014. Roberts then joined Conference side Southport on 27 November 2014, alongside teammate Amadou Bakayoko. After failing to make an appearance for Southport, Roberts enjoyed a successful spell with Gresley in the second half of the season after joining on 16 January 2015. Roberts made eighteen appearances for Gresley as they challenged for a play-off place in the Northern Premier League Division One South. He was handed a new one-year contract by Walsall on 5 June 2015.

Roberts returned to Gresley on a three-month loan on 14 August 2015. He was recalled by Walsall in October, joining the matchday squad for the first time as an unused substitute in the Saddlers' victory over Burton on 10 October 2015. Six days later, Roberts joined Rugby on a one-month loan. He made six appearances for the club before returning to Walsall.

Roberts finally made his debut for Walsall on 6 February 2016 in a 3–0 home defeat against Millwall, following injuries to both Neil Etheridge and Craig MacGillivray.

In July 2016, after signing a new one-year contract with Walsall, he joined Chester on a season-long loan. He made 15 appearances in the National League, including a run of six consecutive clean sheets between September and October.

Roberts finally established himself as Walsall's first-choice goalkeeper during the 2017–18 season, making 28 appearances in all competitions and being rewarded with a new two-and-a-half-year contract on 20 February 2018. He signed a new contract in November 2019.

=== Northampton Town ===
On 22 June 2021, Roberts signed for Northampton Town for an undisclosed fee. He was named in the PFA League Two Team of the Year after keeping 20 clean sheets throughout the season. At the end of his contract, Roberts was offered a new deal by the club but declined and left as a free agent.

=== Middlesbrough ===
On 21 June 2022, Roberts signed for Middlesbrough on a two-year contract. On 18 July 2023, Roberts joined Barnsley on a season-long loan. On 17 May 2024, Middlesbrough announced the player would be leaving in the summer once his contract had expired.

=== Millwall ===
On 22 July 2024, Roberts signed for Championship club Millwall, following the unexpected death of Millwall's first team goalkeeper Matija Sarkic.

In an FA Cup fifth round tie at Crystal Palace on 1 March 2025, Roberts received a red card for a flying kick into the side of Jean-Philippe Mateta's head as he challenged for the ball outside the box, which caused Mateta to receive oxygen on the field before being hospitalised. Roberts' ban was then subsequently increased to six matches due to the violent nature of the challenge.

Having been offered a new deal following the conclusion of the 2024–25 season, Roberts departed the club having been unable to reach an agreement.

=== Mansfield Town ===
On 11 June 2025, Roberts signed for League One club Mansfield Town on a two-year deal.

== Career statistics ==
As of match played 1 August 2026

Appearances and goals by club, season and competition
Club	Season	League			FA Cup		League Cup		Other		Total	
Club	Season	Division	Apps	Goals	Apps	Goals	Apps	Goals	Apps	Goals	Apps	Goals
Walsall	2015–16	League One	1	0	0	0	0	0	0	0	1	0
Walsall	2016–17	League One	0	0	0	0	0	0	0	0	0	0
Walsall	2017–18	League One	24	0	0	0	0	0	4 (Note: Appearance(s) in the EFL Trophy)	0	28	0
Walsall	2018–19	League One	42	0	4	0	0	0	1	0	47	0
Walsall	2019–20	League Two	32	0	2	0	1	0	4	0	39	0
Walsall	2020–21	League Two	32	0	1	0	1	0	0	0	34	0
Walsall	Total		131	0	7	0	2	0	9	0	149	0
Chester (loan)	2016–17	National League	15	0	1	0	—		0	0	16	0
Northampton Town	2021–22	League Two	46	0	2	0	0	0	1 (Note: Appearance in League Two play-offs)	0	49	0
Middlesbrough	2022–23	Championship	4	0	0	0	1	0	—		5	0
Barnsley (loan)	2023–24	League One	38	0	0	0	0	0	2 (Note: Appearance in League One play-offs)	0	40	0
Millwall	2024–25	Championship	2	0	2	0	2	0	—		6	0
Mansfield Town	2025–26	League One	42	0	4	0	2	0	—		48	0
Career total			275	0	16	0	7	0	12	0	309	0

== Honours ==
Individual

- EFL Golden Glove: League Two 2021–22
- Northampton Town Player of the Year: 2021–22
- PFA Team of the Year: League Two 2021–22
