= Kyrell Wilson =

Personal information
- Date of birth: 1 December 2004 (age 21)
- Position: Winger

Team information
- Current team: Gent
- Number: 14

Youth career
- Chelsea
- 2021–2024: Swansea City

Senior career*
Years	Team	Apps	(Gls)
2024–2026	Swansea City	0	(0)
2025	→ Yeovil Town (loan)	15	(1)
2025–2026	→ Falkirk (loan)	28	(3)
2026–	Gent	4	(0)
- * Club domestic league appearances and goals as of 22:14, 2 November 2026 (UTC)

Kyrell Wilson (born 1 December 2004) is an English professional footballer who plays as a winger for Belgian club Gent.

== Career ==
After playing for Chelsea, Wilson joined Swansea City in 2021, turning professional in November 2022, and signing a contract extension in January 2025. Later that month he moved on loan to Yeovil Town.

He spent the 2025–26 on loan with Scottish club Falkirk. He scored on his debut for the club. He said he was "grateful" for the "amazing" loan spell. having "made a strong impression" with the club.

He signed for Belgian club Gent in August 2026.
