= Ben Middlemas =

English footballer

Personal information
- Date of birth: 13 December 2004 (age 21)
- Place of birth: Ashington, England
- Height: 1.82 m (6 ft 0 in)
- Position: Midfielder

Team information
- Current team: Swindon Town
- Number: 20

Youth career
- 2013–2024: Sunderland

Senior career*
Years	Team	Apps	(Gls)
2024–2026	Sunderland	0	(0)
2024	→ South Shields (loan)	5	(0)
2026–	Swindon Town	10	(2)
- * Club domestic league appearances and goals as of 12:59, 13 September 2026 (UTC)

Ben Middlemas (born 13 December 2004) is an English professional footballer who plays as a midfielder for Swindon Town.

== Career ==
Born in Ashington, Middlemas began his career with Sunderland at the age of 8, turning professional in 2023, and moving on loan to South Shields in August 2024. He signed a new contract with Sunderland in July 2025.

He signed a two-and-a-half-year contract with Swindon Town in January 2026 for an undisclosed fee.
