= Ateef Konaté =

French footballer (born 2001)

Personal information
- Date of birth: 4 April 2001 (age 25)
- Place of birth: Aubervilliers, France
- Height: 1.80 m (5 ft 11 in)
- Position: Attacking midfielder

Team information
- Current team: Radnik Bijeljina
- Number: 70

Youth career
- 2014–2020: Le Havre
- 2020–2024: Nottingham Forest

Senior career*
Years	Team	Apps	(Gls)
2018–2020	Le Havre II	32	(5)
2021–2024	Nottingham Forest	1	(27)
2023	→ Oxford United (loan)	5	(12)
2024–2025	Valenciennes B	12	(4)
2026–	Radnik Bijeljina	23	(1)
- * Club domestic league appearances and goals as of 31 October 2026

Ateef Konaté (born 4 April 2001) is a French professional footballer who plays as an attacking midfielder for Bosnian Premier League club Radnik Bijeljina.

== Career ==
=== Le Havre ===
Konaté played with the Le Havre academy from the age of thirteen, before earning his first professional contract in June 2019. Between 2018 and 2020, Konaté made 32 appearances in the Championnat National 2 and Championnat National 3 for Le Havre's second team. He also appeared for the first team in November 2019, appearing as a substitute in a Coupe de France fixture against USL Dunkerque.

=== Nottingham Forest ===
On 13 September 2020, Konaté signed with Nottingham Forest, joining the club's under-23 team. He made his debut for Forest on 11 August 2021, starting in an EFL Cup fixture against Bradford City. His league debut followed on 25 January 2022 against Barnsley.

On 30 January 2023, Konaté signed on loan with EFL League One side Oxford United for the remainder of the season.

On 5 June 2024, it was announced that Konaté would leave Forest at the end of the season.

== Personal life ==
Born in France, Konaté is of Malian descent.

== Career statistics ==
As of match played 31 October 2026

Appearances and goals by club, season and competition
Club	Season	League			National cup (Note: Includes Coupe de France, FA Cup, Bosnian Cup)		League cup (Note: Includes Coupe de la Ligue, EFL Cup)		Total	
Club	Season	Division	Apps	Goals	Apps	Goals	Apps	Goals	Apps	Goals
Le Havre II	2017–18	Championnat National 2	2	0	—		—		2	0
Le Havre II	2018–19	Championnat National 3	16	0	—		—		16	0
Le Havre II	2019–20	Championnat National 2	13	5	—		—		13	5
Le Havre II	2020–21	Championnat National 2	1	0	—		—		1	0
Le Havre II	Total		32	5	—		—		32	5
Le Havre	2019–20	Ligue 2	0	0	1	0	0	0	1	0
Nottingham Forest	2021–22	EFL Championship	1	0	0	0	2	0	3	0
Oxford United (loan)	2022–23	EFL League One	5	12	0	0	0	0	5	0
Valenciennes B	2024–25	Championnat National 3	12	4	—		—		12	4
Radnik Bijeljina	2025–26	Bosnian Premier League	13	0	5	1	—		18	1
Radnik Bijeljina	2026–27	Bosnian Premier League	10	1	1	0	—		11	1
Radnik Bijeljina	Total		23	1	6	1	—		29	2
Career total			73	10	7	1	2	0	82	11

== Honours ==
Nottingham Forest

- EFL Championship play-offs: 2022
