= Aidomo Emakhu =

Irish footballer (born 2003)

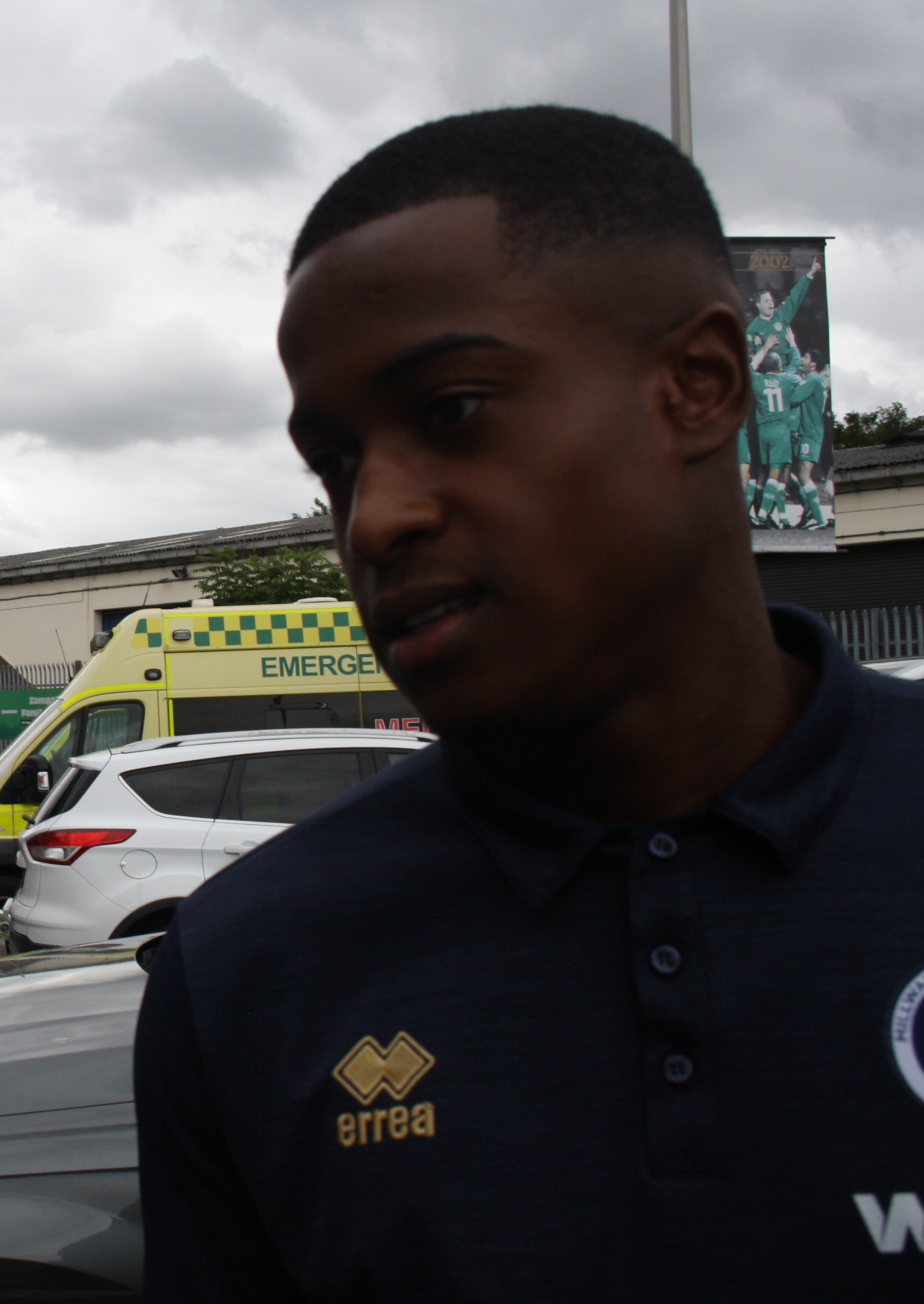
- Emakhu playing for Millwall in 2025.

Personal information
- Full name: Aidomo Abraham Emakhu
- Date of birth: 26 October 2003 (age 23)
- Place of birth: Clondalkin, Ireland
- Height: 1.80 m (5 ft 11 in)
- Position: Forward

Team information
- Current team: Oxford United
- Number: 10

Youth career
- 2009–2013: St Francis
- 2013–2015: Lourdes Celtic
- Crumlin United
- Shamrock Rovers
- Crumlin United
- Shelbourne
- Shamrock Rovers

Senior career*
Years	Team	Apps	(Gls)
2020	Shamrock Rovers II	11	(0)
2021–2022	Shamrock Rovers	34	(2)
2023–2026	Millwall	74	(3)
2026–	Oxford United	19	(1)

International career^{‡}
2021	Republic of Ireland U19	4	(1)
2023–2024	Republic of Ireland U21	12	(4)
2026–	Republic of Ireland	1	(0)
- * Club domestic league appearances and goals as of 13:02, 22 November 2026 (UTC) ‡ National team caps and goals as of 19:12, 16 May 2026 (UTC)

Aidomo Abraham Emakhu (born 26 October 2003) is an Irish professional footballer who plays as a forward for English EFL League One club Oxford United and the Republic of Ireland national team.

== Early life ==
Emakhu is from Bawnogue in Clondalkin. He attended the Moyle Park College in Clondalkin, South Dublin.

== Club career ==
=== Early career ===
Emakhu began his career with St Francis at the age of 6, staying there until he turned 10, before two seasons with Lourdes Celtic and time with Crumlin United. Emakhu then played for Shamrock Rovers, being released at under-15 level; he then returned to Crumlin United and also played for Shelbourne, before returning to Shamrock Rovers.

=== Shamrock Rovers ===
On 15 May 2021, he made his senior debut for Shamrock Rovers, coming on as a substitute for Rory Gaffney in the 88th minute of a 1–1 league draw against Derry City. On 5 August 2021, he made his debut in a European competition, coming on the pitch in the final minutes of the UEFA Europa Conference League qualifying match against Teuta Durrës and scoring the game's only goal.

=== Millwall ===
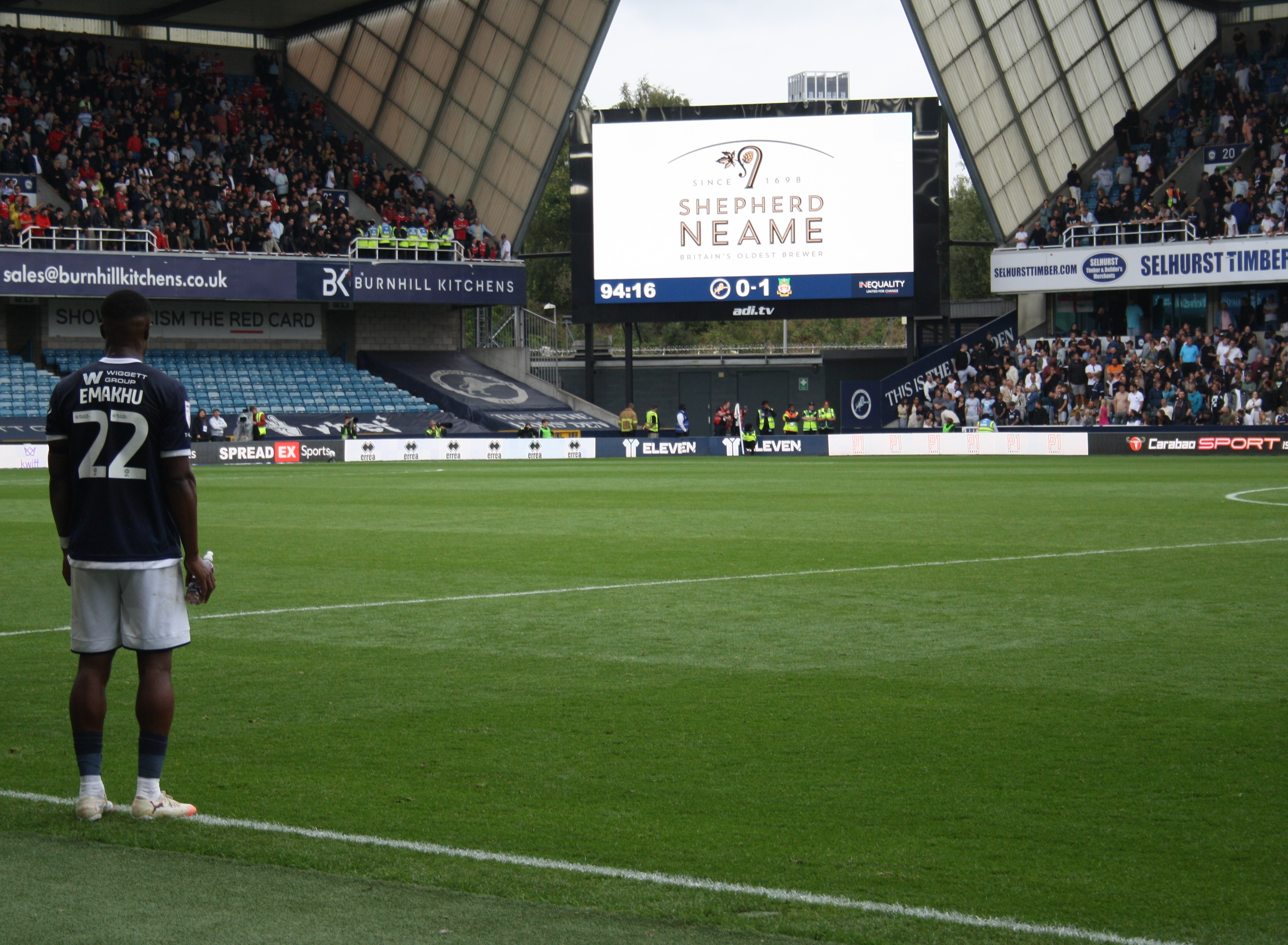
Emakhu playing for Millwall in 2025.

In December 2022 it was announced that he would join English club Millwall the following month. He was initially assigned to the club's under-23 team, but trained with the first team. He made his debut for the club on 21 February 2023 in a 1–1 draw with league leaders Burnley at The Den.

In total he made 82 appearances in all competitions for the club, scoring 3 goals, before departing for an undisclosed fee in February 2026.

=== Oxford United ===
On transfer deadline day in February 2026, Emakhu joined fellow Championship club Oxford United on a long-term deal for an undisclosed fee. He made 12 appearances in all competitions in his first 4 months with the club, as they were relegated to EFL League One after finishing 22nd in the Championship.

== International career ==
Born in Ireland, Emakhu is of Nigerian descent. He has played for the Republic of Ireland at under-19 youth level, scoring on his debut in October 2021. Emakhu scored his first goal for the Republic of Ireland U21 side in a 3–0 win over Kuwait U22 in a friendly on 19 June 2023. In May 2026, Emakhu received his first call up to the senior Republic of Ireland squad for their friendly against Grenada. On 16 May 2026, he made his senior Ireland debut, replacing Chiedozie Ogbene from the bench in a 5–0 win over Grenada.

== Career statistics ==
=== Club ===
As of match played 21 November 2026

Appearances and goals by club, season and competition
Club	Season	League			National cup		League cup		Europe		Other		Total	
Club	Season	Division	Apps	Goals	Apps	Goals	Apps	Goals	Apps	Goals	Apps	Goals	Apps	Goals
Shamrock Rovers II	2020	LOI First Division	11	0	—		—		—		—		11	0
Shamrock Rovers	2021	LOI Premier Division	12	1	1	0	—		1 (Note: Appearance in UEFA Europa Conference League)	1	—		14	2
Shamrock Rovers	2022	LOI Premier Division	22	1	2	1	—		7 (Note: Three appearances and one goal in UEFA Champions League, three appearances and one goal in UEFA Europa League and one appearance in UEFA Europa Conference League)	2	1 (Note: Appearance in President of Ireland's Cup)	0	32	4
Shamrock Rovers	Total		34	2	3	1	0	0	8	3	1	0	46	6
Millwall	2022–23	Championship	1	0	0	0	—		—		—		1	0
Millwall	2023–24	Championship	21	1	0	0	1	0	—		—		22	1
Millwall	2024–25	Championship	25	0	1	0	2	0	—		—		28	0
Millwall	2025–26	Championship	27	2	1	0	3	0	—		—		31	2
Millwall	Total		74	3	2	0	6	0	0	0	0	0	82	3
Oxford United	2025–26	Championship	11	0	1	0	0	0	—		—		12	0
Oxford United	2026–27	League One	8	1	1	0	1	0	—		1 (Note: Appearance in the EFL Trophy)	0	11	1
Oxford United	Total		19	1	2	0	1	0	0	0	1	0	23	1
Career total			138	6	7	1	7	0	8	3	2	0	162	10

=== International ===
As of match played on 16 May 2026

Appearances and goals by national team and year
National team	Year	Apps	Goals
Republic of Ireland
Republic of Ireland	2026	1	0
Total		1	0

== Honours ==
Shamrock Rovers

- League of Ireland Premier Division: 2021, 2022
- President of Ireland's Cup: 2022
