= Murray Wallace =

Murray Wallace may refer to:

- Murray Wallace (footballer) (born 1993), Scottish professional footballer
- Murray Wallace (rugby union) (born 1967), Scottish international rugby union player
