= Hayden Muller =

English footballer

- Muller playing for Yeovil Town in 2026

Personal information
- Full name: Hayden Kai Muller
- Date of birth: 7 February 2002 (age 24)
- Place of birth: Croydon, England
- Height: 1.93 m (6 ft 4 in)
- Position: Defender

Team information
- Current team: Yeovil Town
- Number: 4

Youth career
- 2012–2020: Millwall

Senior career*
Years	Team	Apps	(Gls)
2020–2023	Millwall	3	(0)
2021–2022	→ St Johnstone (loan)	8	(0)
2023–2024	Dundalk	49	(1)
2024–2026	Sutton United	56	(2)
2025	→ Salisbury (loan)	9	(0)
2026–	Yeovil Town	16	(1)
- * Club domestic league appearances and goals as of 22:26, 21 November 2026 (UTC)

Hayden Kai Muller (born 7 February 2002) is an English footballer who plays for National League club Yeovil Town.

== Career ==
Muller made his professional debut for Millwall on the final day of the 2019–20 season in a 4–1 victory against Huddersfield Town. He signed a new contract with the club in June 2021.

On 30 June 2021, Muller joined Scottish Premiership side St Johnstone on a season-long loan deal. He was recalled by Millwall in January 2022.

On 13 January 2023, Muller signed a multi-year contract with League of Ireland Premier Division club Dundalk.

On 9 July 2024, Dundalk announced that Muller had left the club to sign for National League side Sutton United.

In June 2026, Muller agreed to join fellow National League side Yeovil Town after turning down a new contract offer from Sutton United.

== Career statistics ==
As of match played 21 November 2026

Appearances and goals by club, season and competition
Club	Season	League			National cup (Note: Includes FA Cup, FAI Cup)		League cup (Note: Includes EFL Cup)		Other		Total	
Club	Season	Division	Apps	Goals	Apps	Goals	Apps	Goals	Apps	Goals	Apps	Goals
Millwall	2019–20	EFL Championship	1	0	0	0	0	0	—		1	0
Millwall	2020–21	EFL Championship	2	0	0	0	1	0	—		3	0
Millwall	2021–22	EFL Championship	0	0	0	0	0	0	—		0	0
Millwall	2022–23	EFL Championship	0	0	0	0	0	0	—		0	0
Millwall	Total		3	0	0	0	1	0	—		4	0
St Johnstone (loan)	2021–22	Scottish Premiership	8	0	—		0	0	—		8	0
Dundalk	2023	LOI Premier Division	33	1	2	1	—		2 (Note: One appearance in UEFA Europa Conference League, one appearance in Leinster Senior Cup)	0	37	2
Dundalk	2024	LOI Premier Division	16	0	—		—		3 (Note: Appearances in Leinster Senior Cup)	1	19	1
Dundalk	Total		49	1	2	1	—		5	1	56	3
Sutton United	2024–25	National League	26	0	—		—		8 (Note: Three appearances in FA Trophy, five appearances in National League Cup)	0	0	0
Sutton United	2025–26	National League	30	2	2	0	—		6 (Note: One appearance in FA Trophy, two appearances in National League Cup, three appearances in Surrey Senior Cup)	0	0	0
Sutton United	Total		56	2	2	0	—		14	0	68	2
Salisbury (loan)	2025–26	National League South	9	0	3	0	—		0	0	12	0
Yeovil Town	2026–27	National League	16	1	3	1	—		1 (Note: Appearance in Somerset Premier Cup)	0	20	2
Career total			141	4	10	2	1	0	20	1	172	7
