= Jayson Molumby =

Irish footballer (born 1999)

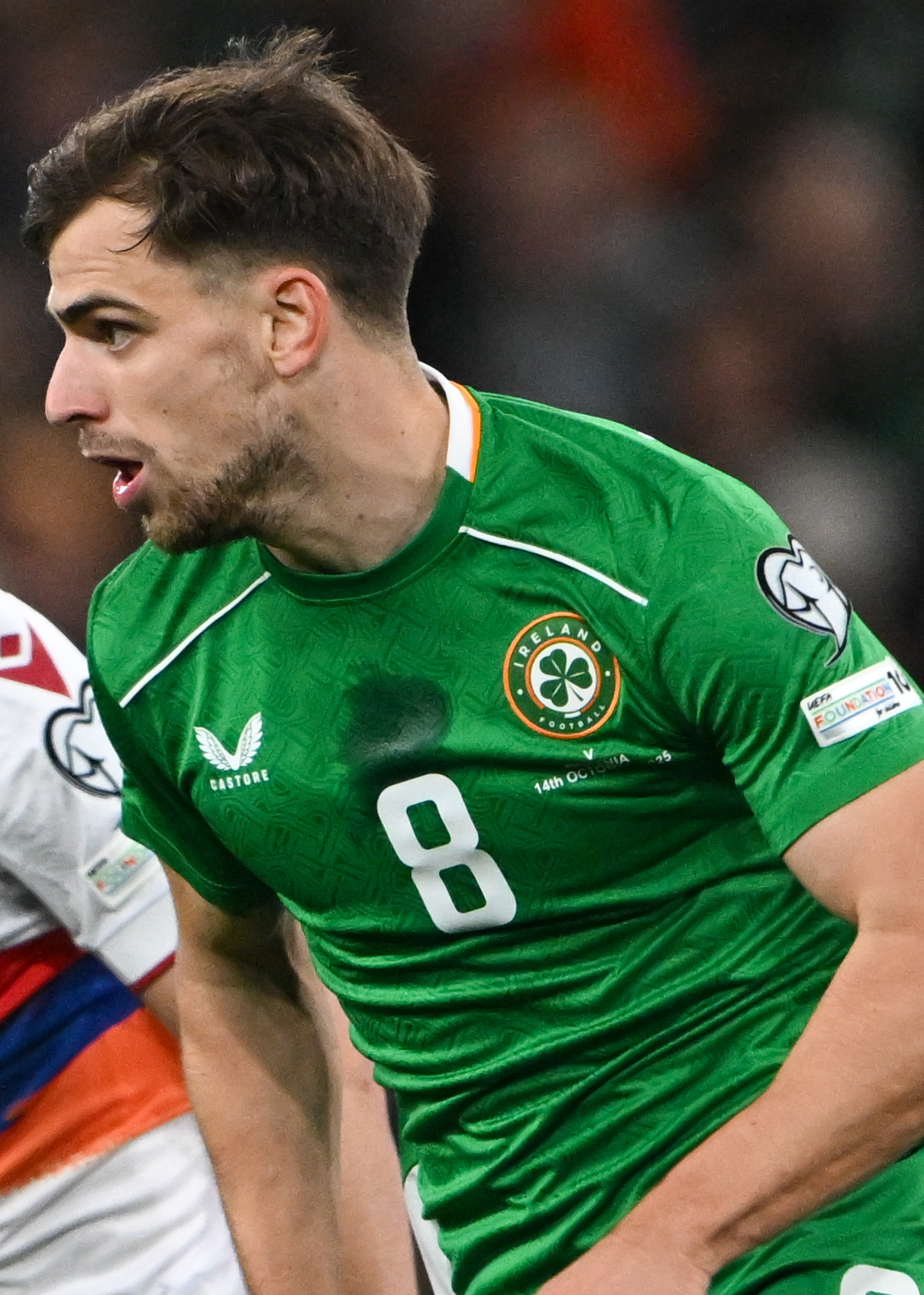
- Molumby with the Republic of Ireland in 2025

Personal information
- Full name: Jayson Patrick Molumby
- Date of birth: 6 August 1999 (age 27)
- Place of birth: Cappoquin, Ireland
- Height: 1.75 m (5 ft 9 in)
- Position: Defensive midfielder

Team information
- Current team: West Bromwich Albion
- Number: 8

Youth career
- 2004–2013: Railway Athletic
- 2013–2014: Villa
- 2014–2015: Railway Athletic
- 2015–2019: Brighton & Hove Albion

Senior career*
| Years | Team | Apps | (Gls) |
| 2017–2022 | Brighton & Hove Albion | 1 | (0) |
| 2019–2020 | → Millwall (loan) | 36 | (1) |
| 2021 | → Preston North End (loan) | 15 | (0) |
| 2021–2022 | → West Bromwich Albion (loan) | 31 | (1) |
| 2022– | West Bromwich Albion | 156 | (11) |

International career^{‡}
| 2013–2014 | Republic of Ireland U15 | 6 | (0) |
| 2015 | Republic of Ireland U16 | 6 | (1) |
| 2015–2016 | Republic of Ireland U17 | 6 | (2) |
| 2016–2017 | Republic of Ireland U19 | 12 | (5) |
| 2019 | Republic of Ireland U21 | 10 | (0) |
| 2020– | Republic of Ireland | 42 | (0) |
- * Club domestic league appearances and goals as of 22:06, 7 November 2026 (UTC) ‡ National team caps and goals as of 21:41, 17 November 2026 (UTC)

Jayson Patrick Molumby (born 6 August 1999) is an Irish professional footballer who plays as a defensive midfielder for EFL Championship club West Bromwich Albion and the Republic of Ireland national team.

Molumby started his career playing youth football with Railway Athletic in his home town of Cappoquin and then Villa in Waterford City before signing for the academy of Brighton & Hove Albion where he later made his senior professional debut. He went on to make five appearances for the Sussex club where he also made Premier League debut. During his time at Brighton he had three loan spells, all to Championship sides in Millwall, where he scored his first professional goal, Preston North End and West Bromwich Albion where he went on to sign a permanent deal with The Baggies in May 2022.

He made his senior Republic of Ireland debut in September 2020 at the age of 21 after progressing through the youth ranks.

== Early life ==
Molumby was born in Cappoquin in County Waterford. He started his career at Railway Athletic before playing for a short period at Villa FC. He returned to Railway where they developed him from a very young age. He spent a season at Railway Athletic before joining Brighton in 2015.

== Club career ==
=== Brighton & Hove Albion ===
==== Development side ====
Molumby became a key part of the Brighton youth teams, playing for both the under-23s and the under-18s. He played in the EFL Trophy in 2016–17 season, including the last-16 match against Coventry City which saw Brighton knocked out. He also played in the semi-final of the Sussex Senior Challenge Cup.

==== 2017–18 ====
Molumby made his debut for the Seagulls first team on 22 August in an EFL Cup second round match against Barnet, starting the move that led to the only goal of the game. He made his second appearance for the senior side in the next round of the EFL Cup, playing 120 minutes against Bournemouth alongside fellow Irishman Dessie Hutchinson in the eventual away loss.

==== Millwall (loan) ====
On 23 July 2019, Molumby joined Millwall on loan for the duration of the 2019–20 season. On 13 August Molumby made his Millwall debut in the first round of the EFL Cup where he started in the 2–1 away win over West Brom. Eight days later, Molumby made his career league debut coming on as a sub in a 4–0 away defeat to Fulham in the Championship. After impressing with Millwall, Molumby signed a new three-and-a-half-year contract with Brighton in early March 2020. Molumby scored his first career goal on 18 July scoring the last of the seven goal thriller away at QPR where Millwall lost 4–3 ending The Lions play-off hopes.

==== Back to Brighton ====
On 17 September 2020, Molumby made his first appearance for Brighton in over three years playing the whole match in a 4–0 home victory over Portsmouth in the EFL Cup match. He featured in a Premier League match day squad for the first time on 26 September where he remained an unused substitute in the 3–2 home loss against Manchester United. Four days later Brighton faced United again this time in the EFL Cup where Molumby started and played 81 minutes of the 3–0 home defeat falling short of a quarter final place.

Molumby made his Premier League debut on 21 November, coming on as 90+5th-minute substitute helping the Seagulls hold on to their lead over Aston Villa where it finished 2–1 away from home.

==== Preston (loan) ====
On 5 January 2021, Molumby joined Championship side Preston North End on loan until the end of the season. He made his debut four days later, starting and playing 75 minutes of the eventual 4–1 third round FA Cup defeat away at Wycombe. A week later he made his league debut for The Lilywhites coming on as a 79th-minute substitute in a 2–0 away loss against Bristol City. On his third appearance he assisted a Scott Sinclair goal in a 1–0 away win over Birmingham City on 20 January.

=== West Bromwich Albion ===
==== Initial loan ====
On Friday 27 August 2021, Molumby signed with EFL Championship club West Bromwich Albion on loan until the end of the season, with a view to a permanent transfer. He made his debut on 28 September, coming on as an 81st-minute substitute replacing captain Jake Livermore in the 4–0 away win over Cardiff City. Molumby made his first start on his fourth appearance on 20 October, playing 79 minutes of the eventual 2–1 away defeat at Swansea City. Three days later, he made his second start for The Baggies where he played the whole match of the 3–0 home win over Bristol City. On 26 November, Molumby was sent off for the first time in his career for a second bookable offence in the 0–0 home draw against Nottingham Forest. He scored his first goal for The Baggies on 22 February 2022, his second career goal, putting Albion in front, however Middlesbrough fought back and won 2–1 at the Riverside Stadium.

==== Permanent signing ====
On 4 May 2022, Molumby signed for the Baggies on a permanent deal agreeing a three-year contract with the club with the deal officially going through on 1 July.

He scored his first goal of the season on 14 January 2023, smashing home the equaliser after coming from 2–0 down before going on to win 3–2 away at Luton Town. On 15 April, Molumby scored his first career brace, scoring the equaliser and then the winner within 10 minutes in the 2–1 away win over Stoke City.

== International career ==
Molumby was called up to the Irish under-15 panel for the 2013–14 season. He was included in the Republic's under-16 squad for a four nation tournament in Netherlands, taking on United States, Czech Republic and Netherlands. On 20 March 2016, Molumby was given the under-16 International Player of the Year award for 2015.

Molumby spent time as captain of Ireland's under-17 team. He scored the winning goal in a match against Finland. He scored his first under-19 goal against Austria on 6 September 2016. On 14 March 2017, he was nominated for the under-17 International Player of the Year for 2016, losing out to Declan Rice of West Ham United.

Molumby was included in Stephen Kenny's first Republic of Ireland U21 squad in March 2019 for a European qualifier vs Luxembourg U21. He was named captain of the side and continued to captain Ireland at the 2019 Toulon Tournament where Ireland came fourth losing Mexico on penalties in the third-place playoff game. He has since captained the side to wins over Armenia U21 and Sweden U21 to put Ireland top of their group.

On 24 August 2020, Molumby was named in the Republic of Ireland senior squad for the first time for the UEFA Nations League games against Bulgaria and Finland, in what was his manager at under 21 level, Stephen Kenny's first squad as senior manager. He made his debut on 6 September in the 1–0 defeat against Finland at the Aviva Stadium.

== Style of play ==
Molumby is comfortable playing in any form of central midfield role, including attacking or defensive, and has high energy levels. He is confident on the ball, and looks to make probing passes.

== Career statistics ==
=== Club ===
As of match played 7 November 2026

Appearances and goals by club, season and competition
| Club | Season | League | | | FA Cup | | League Cup | | Other | | Total | |
| Club | Season | Division | Apps | Goals | Apps | Goals | Apps | Goals | Apps | Goals | Apps | Goals |
|---|---|---|---|---|---|---|---|---|---|---|---|---|
| Brighton & Hove Albion U23 | 2016–17 | — | | | — | | — | | 5 (Note: Four appearances in EFL Trophy, one appearance in Sussex Senior Challenge Cup) | 0 | 5 | 0 |
| Brighton & Hove Albion U23 | 2017–18 | — | | | — | | — | | 1 (Note: Appearances in EFL Trophy) | 0 | 1 | 0 |
| Brighton & Hove Albion U23 | Total | | — | | — | | — | | 6 | 0 | 6 | 0 |
| Brighton & Hove Albion | 2016–17 | Championship | 0 | 0 | 0 | 0 | 0 | 0 | 0 | 0 | 0 | 0 |
| Brighton & Hove Albion | 2017–18 | Premier League | 0 | 0 | 0 | 0 | 2 | 0 | 0 | 0 | 2 | 0 |
| Brighton & Hove Albion | 2020–21 | Premier League | 1 | 0 | 0 | 0 | 2 | 0 | 0 | 0 | 3 | 0 |
| Brighton & Hove Albion | Total | | 1 | 0 | 0 | 0 | 4 | 0 | 0 | 0 | 5 | 0 |
| Millwall (loan) | 2019–20 | Championship | 36 | 1 | 2 | 0 | 2 | 0 | — | | 40 | 1 |
| Preston North End (loan) | 2020–21 | Championship | 15 | 0 | 1 | 0 | 0 | 0 | — | | 16 | 0 |
| West Bromwich Albion (loan) | 2021–22 | Championship | 31 | 1 | 0 | 0 | — | | — | | 31 | 1 |
| West Bromwich Albion | 2022–23 | Championship | 43 | 4 | 3 | 0 | 1 | 0 | — | | 47 | 4 |
| West Bromwich Albion | 2023–24 | Championship | 24 | 0 | 0 | 0 | 1 | 0 | — | | 25 | 0 |
| West Bromwich Albion | 2024–25 | Championship | 37 | 4 | 1 | 0 | 0 | 0 | — | | 38 | 4 |
| West Bromwich Albion | 2025–26 | Championship | 38 | 2 | 1 | 0 | 1 | 0 | — | | 40 | 2 |
| West Bromwich Albion | 2026–27 | Championship | 14 | 1 | 0 | 0 | 2 | 0 | — | | 16 | 1 |
| West Bromwich Albion | Total | | 156 | 11 | 5 | 0 | 5 | 0 | 0 | 0 | 166 | 11 |
| Career total | | | 239 | 13 | 8 | 0 | 11 | 0 | 6 | 0 | 264 | 13 |

=== International ===
As of match played 17 November 2026

Appearances and goals by national team and year
| National team | Year | Apps | Goals |
|---|---|---|---|
Republic of Ireland
| Republic of Ireland | 2020 | 5 | 0 |
| Republic of Ireland | 2021 | 7 | 0 |
| Republic of Ireland | 2022 | 5 | 0 |
| Republic of Ireland | 2023 | 7 | 0 |
| Republic of Ireland | 2024 | 5 | 0 |
| Republic of Ireland | 2025 | 3 | 0 |
| Republic of Ireland | 2026 | 10 | 0 |
| Total | | 42 | 0 |

== Honours ==
Brighton & Hove Albion U23

- Sussex Senior Challenge Cup: 2016–17

Individual

- FAI Under-16 International Player of the Year: 2015
- West Bromwich Albion Supporters' Player of the Season: 2022–23
