= 2021–22 Millwall F.C. season =

Millwall F.C.
2021–22 season
- Owner: Millwall Holdings
- Chairman: John Berylson
- Manager: Gary Rowett
- Stadium: The Den
- Championship: 9th
- FA Cup: Third round (eliminated by Crystal Palace)
- EFL Cup: Third round (eliminated by Leicester City)
- Top goalscorer: League: Benik Afobe (12); All: Benik Afobe (13)
- Highest home attendance: 16,734 vs Middlesbrough
- Lowest home attendance: 4,005 vs Cambridge United
- Average home league attendance: 12,970
- Biggest win: 4–1 vs Barnsley
- Biggest defeat: 0–3 vs Fulham
Home colours	Away colours

The 2021–22 season was Millwall's 137th year in existence, 95th consecutive season in the Football League, and 45th in the second tier. The club competed in the Championship for the fifth consecutive season and finished ninth. Millwall had a chance of making the play-offs right down the last game day, but ultimately missed out by six points. The team also played in the FA Cup and League Cup, and were knocked out in the early rounds.

== First-team squad ==
As of 1 June 2021

Note: Flags indicate national team as has been defined under FIFA eligibility rules. Players may hold more than one non-FIFA nationality.

No.	Name	Nat.	Position(s)	Date of birth (age)	Apps.	Goals	Year signed	Signed from	Transfer fee
Goalkeepers
1	George Long	(England)	GK	5 November 1993 (age 33)	2	0	2021	(England) Hull City	Free
33	Bartosz Białkowski	(Poland)	GK	6 July 1987 (aged 33)	136	0	2020	(England) Ipswich Town	£350,000
Defenders
2	Danny McNamara	(Republic of Ireland) (England)	RB/RM	27 December 1998 (aged 22)	48	2	2018	Academy	Trainee
3	Murray Wallace	(Scotland)	CB/LB	10 January 1993 (aged 28)	137	11	2018	(England) Scunthorpe United	Undisclosed
4	Shaun Hutchinson	(England)	CB/DM	23 November 1990 (aged 30)	210	13	2016	(England) Fulham	Free
5	Jake Cooper	(England)	CB	3 February 1995 (aged 26)	244	18	2017	(England) Reading	Undisclosed
11	Scott Malone	(England)	LB/LM	25 March 1991 (age 35)	149	14	2021	(England) Derby County	Free
15	Alex Pearce	(Republic of Ireland) (Scotland) (England)	CB	9 November 1988 (aged 32)	79	1	2019	(England) Derby County	Free
26	Daniel Ballard	(Northern Ireland) (England)	CB/DM	22 September 1999 (age 27)	26	1	2021	(England) Arsenal	Loan
Midfielders
6	Maikel Kieftenbeld	(Netherlands)	DM/CM	26 June 1990 (aged 31)	36	0	2021	(England) Birmingham City	Undisclosed
7	Jed Wallace	(England)	RW/AM	26 March 1994 (aged 27)	253	43	2017	(England) Wolverhampton Wanderers	Undisclosed
16	Luke Freeman	(England)	AM/LW/RW	22 March 1992 (aged 30)	1	0	2022	(England) Sheffield United	Loan
17	George Saville	(England)	CM/DM	1 June 1993 (age 33)	86	13	2021	(England) Middlesbrough	Undisclosed
18	Ryan Leonard	(England)	CM/RM/RB	24 May 1992 (aged 29)	109	5	2019	(England) Sheffield United	£1,500,000
21	Connor Mahoney	(England)	LM/RM/AM	12 February 1997 (aged 24)	65	5	2019	(England) Bournemouth	Undisclosed
24	Billy Mitchell	(England)	CM	7 April 2001 (aged 20)	65	1	2019	Academy	Trainee
28	George Evans	(England)	CM/CB	13 December 1994 (aged 26)	39	2	2021	(England) Derby County	Undisclosed
32	Tyler Burey	(England)	AM/CF/LM/RM	9 January 2001 (aged 20)	27	2	2019	(England) AFC Wimbledon	Free
Forwards
9	Tom Bradshaw	(Wales)	CF	27 July 1992 (aged 28)	115	23	2019	(England) Barnsley	£1,250,000
10	Oliver Burke	(Scotland)	CF/RW/LW	7 April 1997 (age 29)	13	2	2022	(England) Sheffield United	Loan
14	Sheyi Ojo	(England)	RW/LW/SS	19 June 1997 (age 29)	17	0	2021	(England) Liverpool	Loan
20	Mason Bennett	(England)	LW/RW/CF	15 July 1996 (aged 24)	74	11	2020	(England) Derby County	Undisclosed
23	Benik Afobe	(Democratic Republic of the Congo) (England)	CF/SS/RW	12 February 1993 (age 33)	41	13	2021	(England) Stoke City	Loan
Out on Loan
12	Mahlon Romeo	(Antigua and Barbuda) (England)	RB	19 September 1995 (aged 25)	220	3	2015	(England) Gillingham	Free
25	Isaac Olaofe	(England)	CF/RW/LW	21 November 1999 (age 26)	0	0	2019	Academy	Trainee
	Hayden Muller	(England)	CB	7 February 2002 (aged 19)	4	0	2019	Academy	Trainee

== Statistics ==
As of 7 May 2022
Players with names in italics and marked * were on loan from another club for the whole of their season with Millwall.

No.	Pos	Nat	Player	Total		Championship		FA Cup		League Cup	
No.	Pos	Nat	Player	Apps	Goals	Apps	Goals	Apps	Goals	Apps	Goals
1	GK	(England) ENG	George Long	3	0	0+0	0	1+0	0	2+0	0
2	DF	(Republic of Ireland) IRL	Danny McNamara	32	2	27+4	2	1+0	0	0+0	0
3	DF	(Scotland) SCO	Murray Wallace	37	6	36+0	4	0+0	0	1+0	2
4	DF	(England) ENG	Shaun Hutchinson	30	0	27+1	0	1+0	0	1+0	0
5	DF	(England) ENG	Jake Cooper	39	4	35+1	4	1+0	0	2+0	0
6	MF	(Netherlands) NED	Maikel Kieftenbeld	27	0	19+6	0	0+1	0	1+0	0
7	MF	(England) ENG	Jed Wallace	33	6	27+5	6	0+0	0	1+0	0
8	MF	(England) ENG	Ben Thompson	3	0	0+1	0	0+0	0	1+1	0
9	FW	(Wales) WAL	Tom Bradshaw	25	9	15+7	9	1+0	0	2+0	0
10	FW	(Scotland) SCO	Oliver Burke*	13	2	10+3	2	0+0	0	0+0	0
11	DF	(England) ENG	Scott Malone	35	3	30+3	2	1+0	0	1+0	1
14	FW	(England) ENG	Sheyi Ojo*	17	0	12+4	0	1+0	0	0+0	0
15	DF	(Republic of Ireland) IRL	Alex Pearce	7	0	3+2	0	1+0	0	1+0	0
16	MF	(England) ENG	Luke Freeman*	1	0	0+1	0	0+0	0	0+0	0
17	MF	(England) ENG	George Saville	35	3	29+3	2	1+0	0	1+1	1
18	MF	(England) ENG	Ryan Leonard	19	0	10+8	0	0+0	0	1+0	0
20	FW	(England) ENG	Mason Bennett	27	3	14+12	3	0+1	0	0+0	0
21	MF	(England) ENG	Connor Mahoney	9	0	1+6	0	0+0	0	1+1	0
23	FW	(Democratic Republic of the Congo) COD	Benik Afobe	36	13	30+4	12	1+0	1	1+0	0
24	MF	(England) ENG	Billy Mitchell	38	0	29+7	0	1+0	0	1+0	0
26	DF	(England) ENG	Dan Ballard*	26	1	25+0	1	0+0	0	1+0	0
28	MF	(England) ENG	George Evans	19	1	10+8	1	0+0	0	1+0	0
32	MF	(England) ENG	Tyler Burey	12	2	2+9	2	0+1	0	0+0	0
33	GK	(Poland) POL	Bartosz Białkowski	46	0	46+0	0	0+0	0	0+0	0
38	FW	(England) ENG	Nana Boateng	1	0	0+0	0	0+1	0	0+0	0
49	FW	(England) ENG	Zak Lovelace	2	0	0+2	0	0+0	0	0+0	0
Players out on loan:
12	DF	(Antigua and Barbuda) ANT	Mahlon Romeo	3	0	2+0	0	0+0	0	1+0	0
34	DF	(England) ENG	Alex Mitchell	1	0	0+0	0	0+0	0	0+1	0
Players who left the club:
10	FW	(England) ENG	Matt Smith	24	2	6+15	1	0+1	0	1+1	1
22	FW	(Iceland) ISL	Jón Daði Böðvarsson	1	0	0+0	0	0+0	0	0+1	0

=== Goals record ===
As of 7 May 2022

Rank	No.	Nat.	Po.	Name	Championship	FA Cup	League Cup	Total
1	23	(Democratic Republic of the Congo)	CF	Benik Afobe	12	1	0	13
2	9	(Wales)	CF	Tom Bradshaw	9	0	0	9
3	3	(Scotland)	CB	Murray Wallace	4	0	2	6
3	7	(England)	RM	Jed Wallace	6	0	0	6
5	17	(England)	CM	George Saville	2	0	1	3
5	20	(England)	LW	Mason Bennett	3	0	0	3
7	2	(Republic of Ireland)	RB	Danny McNamara	2	0	0	2
7	5	(England)	CB	Jake Cooper	2	0	0	2
7	10	(Scotland)	CF	Oliver Burke	2	0	0	2
7	~~10~~	(England)	CF	Matt Smith	1	0	1	2
7	11	(England)	LB	Scott Malone	1	0	1	2
7	32	(England)	AM	Tyler Burey	2	0	0	2
10	26	(England)	CB	Daniel Ballard	1	0	0	1
10	28	(England)	CM	George Evans	1	0	0	1
Own Goals					2	0	0	2
Total					50	1	5	56

=== Disciplinary record ===
As of 7 May 2022

Rank	No.	Nat.	Po.	Name	Championship			FA Cup			League Cup			Total		
Rank	No.	Nat.	Po.	Name	Yellow card	(yellow card) (yellow-red card)	Red card	Yellow card	(yellow card) (yellow-red card)	Red card	Yellow card	(yellow card) (yellow-red card)	Red card	Yellow card	(yellow card) (yellow-red card)	Red card
1	17	(England)	CM	George Saville	9	0	0	0	0	0	0	0	0	9	0	0
2	5	(England)	CB	Jake Cooper	7	0	0	0	0	0	1	0	0	8	0	0
3	6	(Netherlands)	DM	Maikel Kieftenbeld	7	0	0	0	0	0	0	0	0	7	0	0
4	24	(England)	CM	Billy Mitchell	5	0	0	1	0	0	0	0	0	6	0	0
5	2	(Republic of Ireland)	RB	Danny McNamara	5	0	0	0	0	0	0	0	0	5	0	0
5	3	(Scotland)	CB	Murray Wallace	5	0	0	0	0	0	0	0	0	5	0	0
5	20	(England)	RW	Mason Bennett	5	0	0	0	0	0	0	0	0	5	0	0
8	23	(Democratic Republic of the Congo)	CF	Benik Afobe	4	0	0	0	0	0	0	0	0	4	0	0
8	11	(England)	LB	Scott Malone	4	0	0	0	0	0	0	0	0	4	0	0
10	4	(England)	CB	Shaun Hutchinson	3	0	0	0	0	0	0	0	0	3	0	0
10	28	(England)	CM	George Evans	3	0	0	0	0	0	0	0	0	3	0	0
10	26	(England)	CB	Daniel Ballard	3	0	0	0	0	0	0	0	0	3	0	0
13	7	(England)	RM	Jed Wallace	2	0	0	0	0	0	0	0	0	1	0	0
13	9	(Wales)	CF	Tom Bradshaw	2	0	0	0	0	0	0	0	0	2	0	0
13	10	(England)	CF	Matt Smith	2	0	0	0	0	0	0	0	0	2	0	0
13	18	(England)	CM	Ryan Leonard	2	0	0	0	0	0	0	0	0	2	0	0
13	32	(England)	AM	Tyler Burey	2	0	0	0	0	0	0	0	0	2	0	0
18	12	(Antigua and Barbuda)	RB	Mahlon Romeo	1	0	0	0	0	0	0	0	0	1	0	0
18	33	(Poland)	GK	Bartosz Białkowski	1	0	0	0	0	0	0	0	0	1	0	0
Total					71	0	0	1	0	0	1	0	0	73	0	0

== Transfers ==
=== Transfers in ===
Date	Position	Nationality	Name	From	Fee	Ref.
1 July 2021	GK	(England)	George Long	(England) Hull City	Free transfer	
1 July 2021	LB	(England)	Scott Malone	(England) Derby County	Free transfer	
2 July 2021	CM	(England)	George Saville	(England) Middlesbrough	Undisclosed	

=== Loans in ===
Date from	Position	Nationality	Name	From	Date until	Ref.
1 July 2021	CB	(Northern Ireland)	Daniel Ballard	(England) Arsenal	End of season	
2 July 2021	CF	(Democratic Republic of the Congo)	Benik Afobe	(England) Stoke City	End of season	
31 August 2021	RW	(England)	Sheyi Ojo	(England) Liverpool	End of season	
21 January 2022	CF	(Scotland)	Oliver Burke	(England) Sheffield United	End of season	
1 February 2022	AM	(England)	Luke Freeman	(England) Sheffield United	End of season	

=== Loans out ===
Date from	Position	Nationality	Name	To	Date until	Ref.
1 July 2021	CB	(England)	Hayden Muller	(Scotland) St Johnstone	End of season	
5 August 2021	MF	(England)	Tyler Burey	(England) Hartlepool United	1 January 2022	
27 August 2021	RB	(England)	Dan Moss	(England) Yeovil Town	12 January 2022	
27 August 2021	FW	(Republic of Ireland)	Sean O'Brien	(England) Bromley	22 September 2021	
31 August 2021	CB	(England)	Alex Mitchell	(England) Leyton Orient	End of season	
31 August 2021	CF	(England)	Isaac Olaofe	(England) Sutton United	End of season	
31 August 2021	RB	(Antigua and Barbuda)	Mahlon Romeo	(England) Portsmouth	End of season	
18 September 2021	LB	(England)	Junior Tiensia	(England) Dover Athletic	2 January 2022	
26 October 2021	MF	(England)	Jayden Davis	(England) King's Lynn Town	21 November 2021	
29 October 2021	CB	(England)	Arthur Penney	(England) Welling United	18 March 2022	
13 January 2022	RB	(England)	Dan Moss	(England) Leyton Orient	End of season	
14 February 2022	LB	(England)	Junior Tiensia	(England) Dartford	14 March 2022	
18 February 2022	GK	(England)	Joe Wright	(England) Cray Wanderers	End of season	

=== Transfers out ===
Date	Position	Nationality	Name	To	Fee	Ref.
30 June 2021	CF	(England)	George Alexander	(England) Bromley	Released	
30 June 2021	FW	(England)	Oli Bate	Unattached	Released	
30 June 2021	RB	(England)	James Brown	(Scotland) St Johnstone	Released	
30 June 2021	MF	(Wales)	Reuben Duncan	Unattached	Released	
30 June 2021	LM	(Northern Ireland)	Shane Ferguson	(England) Rotherham United	Released	
30 June 2021	GK	(England)	Frank Fielding	(England) Stoke City	Released	
30 June 2021	DF	(England)	Ezekiel Miller	Unattached	Released	
30 June 2021	CB	(England)	Harry Ransom	(England) Crawley Town	Released	
30 June 2021	CM	(England)	Sam Skeffington	(England) Bromley	Released	
30 June 2021	DF	(England)	Rob Strachan	Unattached	Released	
30 June 2021	DM	(Republic of Ireland)	Shaun Williams	(England) Portsmouth	Released	
19 January 2022	CF	(England)	Matt Smith	(England) Salford City	Free transfer	
20 January 2022	CF	(Iceland)	Jón Daði Böðvarsson	(England) Bolton Wanderers	Free transfer	
31 January 2022	CM	(England)	Ben Thompson	(England) Gillingham	Mutual consent	

== Pre-season and friendlies ==
As part of their pre-season preparations, Millwall announced friendly matches against Gillingham and Ipswich Town.

10 July 2021 Friendly	Motherwell	0–2	Millwall	Edinburgh, Scotland
12:30 BST		Report	Thompson 8'; Smith 60'

14 July 2021 Friendly	Watford	3–2	Millwall	London Colney
14:00 BST	Quina 36'; Masina 60'; Fletcher 86'	Report	Smith 57'; Wallace 59'	Stadium: UCL Sports Ground; Attendance: 0 (Behind-closed-doors)

17 July 2021 Friendly	Millwall	2–0	Barnet	Bromley
14:00 BST	Smith 15', 40'	Report		Stadium: Calmont Road; Attendance: 0 (Behind-closed-doors)

24 July 2021 Friendly	Arsenal	4–1	Millwall	Shenley
14:00 BST	Chambers (?); Lacazette (?); Pépé (?); Balogun (?)	Report	Mitchell (?)	Stadium: The UCL Sports Ground; Attendance: 0 (Behind-closed-doors)

27 July 2021 Friendly	Gillingham	1–1	Millwall	Gillingham
19:00 BST	Dempsey 11'	Report	Cooper 85'	Stadium: Priestfield Stadium; Referee: Gavin Ward

31 July 2021 Friendly	Ipswich Town	0–3	Millwall	Ipswich
15:00 BST		Report	Afobe 39', 52'; Wallace 56'	Stadium: Portman Road; Referee: Andy Woolmer

4 August 2021 Friendly	Millwall	2–0	Bromley	Bromley
BST	Mahoney 17' (pen.); Smith 53'	Report		Stadium: Calmont Road; Attendance: 0 (Behind-closed-doors)

== Competitions ==
=== Overview ===
Competition	First match	Last match	Starting round	Record							
Competition	First match	Last match	Starting round	Pld	W	D	L	GF	GA	GD	Win %
	September 2021	May 2022	Matchday 1	0	0	0	0	0	0	+0	—
FA Cup	January 2022		Third round	0	0	0	0	0	0	+0	—
EFL Cup	September 2021		First round	0	0	0	0	0	0	+0	—
Total				0	0	0	0	0	0	+0	—

Last updated: May 2021
Source: Competitions

=== EFL Championship ===
==== League table ====
Pos	Team	Pld	W	D	L	GF	GA	GD	Pts	Promotion, qualification or relegation
6	Luton Town	46	21	12	13	63	55	+8	75	Qualification for Championship play-offs
7	Middlesbrough	46	20	10	16	59	50	+9	70	
8	Blackburn Rovers	46	19	12	15	59	50	+9	69	
9	Millwall	46	18	15	13	53	45	+8	69	
10	West Bromwich Albion	46	18	13	15	52	45	+7	67	
11	Queens Park Rangers	46	19	9	18	60	59	+1	66	
12	Coventry City	46	17	13	16	60	59	+1	64	

Source: EFL Official Website
Rules for classification: 1) Points; 2) Goal difference; 3) Number of goals scored; 4) Head-to-head results; 5) Wins; 6) Away goals; 7) Penalty points (sec 9.5); 8) 12-point sending off offences

==== Results summary ====
Overall								Home						Away					
Pld	W	D	L	GF	GA	GD	Pts	W	D	L	GF	GA	GD	W	D	L	GF	GA	GD
46	18	15	13	53	45	+8	69	13	7	4	33	17	+16	5	8	9	20	28	−8

Last updated: 7 May 2022.

==== Results by matchday ====
Matchday	1	2	3	4	5	6	7	8	9	10	11	12	13	14	15	16	17	18	19	20	21	22	23	24	25	26	27	28	29	30	31	32	33	34	35	36	37	38	39	40	41	42	43	44	45	46
Ground	A	H	H	A	H	A	A	H	A	H	A	H	A	H	A	H	H	A	H	A	H	A	A	A	H	A	H	H	A	H	H	A	H	A	A	H	H	A	A	H	H	A	H	A	H	A
Result	D	D	L	L	W	D	D	D	D	W	W	L	W	W	L	W	D	D	D	L	W	L	W	L	L	L	W	D	L	W	W	W	W	W	D	D	W	L	D	L	W	D	W	D	W	L
Position	11	16	19	21	17	14	15	18	19	14	11	14	11	10	12	9	9	9	10	10	8	11	11	11	11	14	15	14	16	15	14	12	11	10	9	11	10	10	10	10	9	10	7	7	8	9

Updated to match(es) played on 7 May 2022. Source:
A = Away; H = Home; W = Win; D = Draw; L = Loss

==== Matches ====
Millwall's fixtures were announced on 24 June 2021.

7 August 2021 1	Queens Park Rangers	1–1	Millwall	White City
15:00 BST	Dickie 31'	Report	J. Wallace 11'; Ballard (yellow card) 15'; M. Wallace (yellow card) 43'; Saville (yellow card) 59'	Stadium: Kiyan Prince Foundation Stadium; Referee: Oliver Langford

14 August 2021 2	Millwall	1–1	Blackburn Rovers	Bermondsey
15:00 BST	Kieftenbeld (yellow card) 60'; Wallace 64'	Report	Lenihan (yellow card) 52'; Brereton 76'; Ayala (yellow card) 82'	Stadium: The Den; Attendance: 12,490; Referee: Andy Davies

17 August 2021 3	Millwall	1–2	Fulham	Bermondsey
19:45 BST	Romeo (yellow card) 19'; Malone (yellow card) 54'; Afobe 87'; Evans (yellow card) 88'; Cooper (yellow card) 89'	Report	Mitrović 3', (yellow card) 90+3'; Carvalho 8'; Gazzaniga (yellow card) 90+5'	Stadium: The Den; Attendance: 12,700; Referee: Geoff Eltringham
Note: Live on Sky Sports

21 August 2021 4	Cardiff City	3–1	Millwall	Leckwith
15:00 BST	Flint (yellow card) 51', (goal) 66', 70'; Morrison 83'; Nelson (yellow card) 86'	Report	Cooper (yellow card) 65'; Afobe 76'	Stadium: Cardiff City Stadium; Attendance: 18,168; Referee: James Linington

28 August 2021 5	Millwall	2–1	Blackpool	Bermondsey
15:00 BST	Mitchell (yellow card) 50'; Saville (yellow card) 62'; Wallace 63'; Malone (yellow card) 69'; Kieftenbeld (yellow card) 74'; Cooper 90'	Report	Connolly (red card) 14'; Dougall (yellow card) 27'; Lavery 56'; Yates (yellow card) 62'; Anderson (yellow card) 74'	Stadium: The Den; Attendance: 11,049; Referee: Gavin Ward

11 September 2021 6	West Bromwich Albion	1–1	Millwall	West Bromwich
15:00 BST	Kipré (yellow card) 20'; Grant (penalty missed) 45+4'; Bartley 49'	Report	Mitchell (yellow card) 43'; Ballard 55'; Wallace (yellow card) 60'; Smith (yellow card) 90+3'	Stadium: The Hawthorns; Attendance: 23,142; Referee: Andy Woolmer

15 September 2021 7	Swansea City	0–0	Millwall	Landore
19:45 BST	Bennett (yellow card) 37'; Downes (yellow card) 83'	Report	Wallace (yellow card) 77'; Saville (yellow card) 89'	Stadium: Swansea.com Stadium; Referee: John Busby

18 September 2021 8	Millwall	1–1	Coventry City	Bermondsey
15:00 BST	Saville 21', (yellow card) 52'; Wallace (yellow card) 62'	Report	Gyökeres 9'	Stadium: The Den; Attendance: 12,516; Referee: Keith Stroud

25 September 2021 9	Nottingham Forest	1–1	Millwall	West Bridgford
15:00 BST	Lowe 52'; Figueiredo (yellow card) 55'; Worrall (yellow card) 82'	Report	Smith 32'; Kieftenbeld (yellow card) 78'; Afobe (yellow card) 82'; Ballard (yellow card) 85'	Stadium: The City Ground; Attendance: 25,589; Referee: Jeremy Simpson

29 September 2021 10	Millwall	1–0	Bristol City	Bermondsey
19:45 BST	Wallace 64' (pen.); McNamara (yellow card) 79'	Report	Williams (yellow card) 59'; Atkinson (yellow card) 63'	Stadium: The Den; Attendance: 11,839; Referee: Dean Whitestone

2 October 2021 11	Barnsley	0–1	Millwall	Barnsley
15:00 BST	Palmer (yellow card) 45+1'; Adeboyejo (yellow card) 69'	Report	Evans (yellow card) 32'; Wallace 89'	Stadium: Oakwell; Attendance: 11,888; Referee: David Webb

16 October 2021 12	Millwall	0–2	Luton Town	Bermondsey
15:00 BST	Cooper (yellow card) 69'; Wallace (penalty missed) 84'	Report	Cornick 11', 53'; Clark (yellow card) 72'; Naismith (yellow card) 83'; Bree (yellow card) 84'	Stadium: The Den; Attendance: 14,227; Referee: Chris Kavanagh

19 October 2021 13	Sheffield United	1–2	Millwall	Sheffield
19:45 BST	Gibbs-White (yellow card) 34' (yellow-red card) 54'; Sharp 45' (pen.); Stevens (yellow card) 82'; Norwood (yellow card) 90+6'	Report	Wallace 11'; Saville (yellow card) 67'; Cooper 90+2'	Stadium: Bramall Lane; Referee: Matt Donohue

23 October 2021 14	Millwall	2–1	Stoke City	Bermondsey
15:00 BST	Malone (yellow card) 32'; Bradshaw 51', 61'; Smith (yellow card) 84'	Report	Sawyers 20'; Souttar (yellow card) 45+2'	Stadium: The Den; Attendance: 12,896; Referee: Andy Davies

30 October 2021 15	Huddersfield Town	1–0	Millwall	Huddersfield
15:00 BST	Hogg 82'; Koroma (yellow card) 85'; Thomas (yellow card) 90+1'; Campbell (yellow card) 90+2'	Report	Saville (yellow card) 34'; Leonard (yellow card) 85'	Stadium: John Smith's Stadium; Attendance: 15,397; Referee: Geoff Eltringham

2 November 2021 16	Millwall	1–0	Reading	Bermondsey
19:45 GMT	Kieftenbeld (yellow card) 31'; Afobe 71'; Leonard (yellow card) 88'	Report		Stadium: The Den; Attendance: 11,004; Referee: Gavin Ward

6 November 2021 17	Millwall	1–1	Derby County	Bermondsey
15:00 GMT	Malone 45+1'; Mitchell (yellow card) 57'; Cooper (yellow card) 90+1'	Report	Byrne (yellow card) 27' (yellow-red card) 63'; Ebosele 44'	Stadium: The Den; Attendance: 14,372; Referee: Tim Robinson

20 November 2021 18	Middlesbrough	1–1	Millwall	Middlesbrough
15:00 GMT	Crooks 15'; Howson (yellow card) 58'	Report	Bamba 27' (o.g.); Bennett (yellow card) 34'; Cooper (yellow card) 45+3'	Stadium: Riverside Stadium; Attendance: 20,845; Referee: Oliver Langford

24 November 2021 19	Millwall	1–1	Bournemouth	Bermondsey
19:45 GMT	Afobe 67'; Mitchell (yellow card) 83'	Report	Kilkenny (yellow card) 24'; Solanke 44'; Cook (yellow card) 80'	Stadium: The Den; Attendance: 12,237; Referee: Dean Whitestone

27 November 2021 20	Hull City	2–1	Millwall	Kingston upon Hull
15:00 GMT	Honeyman 29'; Smallwood (yellow card) 40'; Longman 53'; Eaves (yellow card) 89'	Report	Bradshaw 45+1'; McNamara (yellow card) 63'; Afobe (yellow card) 89'	Stadium: MKM Stadium; Attendance: 10,613; Referee: Josh Smith

4 December 2021 21	Millwall	3–1	Birmingham City	Bermondsey
15:00 GMT	Wallace 10'; Bradshaw 41'; Evans 73'	Report	Pedersen (yellow card) 20'; Roberts (yellow card) 50'; Deeney 56'	Stadium: The Den; Attendance: 14,324; Referee: Andy Woolmer

11 December 2021 22	Peterborough United	2–1	Millwall	Peterborough
15:00 GMT	Norburn (yellow card) 24'; McNamara 64' (o.g.); Clarke-Harris 68'; Cornell (yellow card) 90+3'	Report	Bradshaw 16'; Malone (yellow card) 22'; McNamara (yellow card) 38'; Hutchinson (yellow card) 45+1'; Mitchell (yellow card) 56'; Evans (yellow card) 62'	Stadium: Weston Homes Stadium; Attendance: 9,140; Referee: Leigh Doughty

29 December 2021 23	Coventry City	0–1	Millwall	Coventry
19:45 GMT	Kane (yellow card) 71'	Report	Bradshaw (yellow card) 56', (goal) 79'	Stadium: Coventry Building Society Arena; Attendance: 18,500; Referee: Geoff Eltringham

2 January 2022 24	Bristol City	3–2	Millwall	Ashton Gate
13:00 GMT	Weimann 7', 73', 85'; Towler (yellow card) 28'; O'Dowda (yellow card) 48'; Semenyo (yellow card) 67'; Wells (yellow card) 90+5'	Report	Bradshaw 23'; Afobe 29' (pen.), (yellow card) 84'	Stadium: Ashton Gate; Referee: Simon Hooper

15 January 2022 25	Millwall	0–1	Nottingham Forest	Bermondsey
15:00 GMT	McNamara (yellow card) 57'	Report	Spence (yellow card) 45+2'; McKenna (yellow card) 85'; Grabban 90+1'	Stadium: The Den; Attendance: 13,297; Referee: Peter Bankes

22 January 2022 26	Blackpool	1–0	Millwall	Blackpool
15:00 GMT	Garbutt (yellow card) 40'; Lavery 55'	Report		Stadium: Bloomfield Road; Attendance: 10,696; Referee: David Webb

29 January 2022 27	Millwall	2–0	West Bromwich Albion	Bermondsey
15:00 GMT	Bennett 67', (yellow card) 70'; Afobe 76'	Report	Furlong (yellow card) 88'	Stadium: The Den; Attendance: 12,855; Referee: Josh Smith

1 February 2022 28	Millwall	0–0	Preston North End	Bermondsey
19:45 GMT	Bennett (yellow card) 60'; Hutchinson (yellow card) 63'; Burey (yellow card) 83'	Report	van den Berg (yellow card) 17'; Whiteman (penalty missed) 63'	Stadium: The Den; Attendance: 10,183; Referee: Kevin Friend

8 February 2022 29	Fulham	3–0	Millwall	Fulham
19:45 GMT	Mitrović 29', 50', (yellow card) 84'; Decordova-Reid 87'	Report	Kieftenbeld (yellow card) 35'; Hutchinson (yellow card) 61'; Bennett (yellow card) 74'	Stadium: Craven Cottage; Attendance: 16,606; Referee: Matt Donohue

12 February 2022 30	Millwall	2–1	Cardiff City	Bermondsey
15:00 GMT	Wallace (yellow card) 53', (goal) 73'; Bennett 82'	Report	Bagan 90+2'	Stadium: The Den; Attendance: 12,710; Referee: Steve Martin

15 February 2022 31	Millwall	2–0	Queens Park Rangers	Bermondsey
19:45 GMT	Bennett 48'; Wallace (yellow card) 59'; Burey 64', (yellow card) 65'	Report	Dickie (yellow card) 45+3'	Stadium: The Den; Attendance: 13,063; Referee: James Linington

23 February 2022 32	Derby County	1–2	Millwall	Derby
19:45 GMT	Cooper 88' (o.g.)	Report	Wallace 2'; Saville (yellow card) 29'; Burey 30'; Allsop (yellow card) 90'	Stadium: Pride Park; Attendance: 23,943; Referee: Jeremy Simpson

26 February 2022 33	Millwall	1–0	Sheffield United	Bermondsey
15:00 GMT	Cooper 61'	Report	Ndiaye (yellow card) 43'; Baldock (yellow card) 51'; Norrington-Davies (yellow card) 70'; Norwood (yellow card) 90+4'	Stadium: The Den; Attendance: 14,638; Referee: Michael Salisbury

5 March 2022 34	Reading	0–1	Millwall	Reading
15:00 GMT	Rinomhota (yellow card) 56'; Yiadom (yellow card) 90'	Report	Wallace (yellow card) 11'; Cooper 37', (yellow card) 45'	Stadium: Select Car Leasing Stadium; Attendance: 14,169; Referee: Andy Woolmer

8 March 2022 35	Blackburn Rovers	0–0	Millwall	Blackburn
19:45 GMT	van Hecke (yellow card) 90'	Report	Cooper (yellow card) 41'; Wallace (yellow card) 67'; Saville (yellow card) 73'	Stadium: Ewood Park; Attendance: 12,874; Referee: Geoff Eltringham

12 March 2022 36	Millwall	0–0	Middlesbrough	Bermondsey
15:00 GMT	Cooper (yellow card) 4'; Ballard (yellow card) 16'; Malone (yellow card) 19'; Wallace (yellow card) 34'	Report	Jones (yellow card) 19'	Stadium: The Den; Attendance: 16,734; Referee: Robert Jones

16 March 2022 37	Millwall	2–0	Huddersfield Town	Bermondsey
19:45 GMT	Bennett (yellow card) 13'; Afobe 27', 57'; Wallace (yellow card) 34'	Report		Stadium: The Den; Attendance: 10,792; Referee: James Linington

19 March 2022 38	Stoke City	2–0	Millwall	Stoke-on-Trent
15:00 GMT	Brown 19', (yellow card) 65'; Tymon (yellow card) 56'; Saville 70' (o.g.); Thompson (yellow card) 84'	Report	Wallace (penalty missed) 76'; Ballard (yellow card) 85'	Stadium: Bet365 Stadium; Attendance: 20,526; Referee: John Brooks

2 April 2022 39	Luton Town	2–2	Millwall	Luton
15:00 BST	Adebayo 33'; Cooper 87' (o.g.)	Report	Bradshaw 25'; Afobe 81'	Stadium: Kenilworth Road; Referee: Graham Scott

5 April 2022 40	Millwall	0–1	Swansea City	Bermondsey
19:45 BST	Ballard (yellow card) 81'	Report	Grimes (yellow card) 22'; Piroe 46'; Latibeaudiere (yellow card) 49'	Stadium: The Den; Attendance: 11,670; Referee: Andy Davies

9 April 2022 41	Millwall	4–1	Barnsley	Bermondsey
15:00 BST	McNamara 31', 47'; Burke 58'; Afobe (yellow card) 70', (goal) 72'	Report	Kitching (yellow card) 26'; Palmer 49'	Stadium: The Den; Attendance: 13,231; Referee: Oliver Langford

15 April 2022 42	Preston North End	1–1	Millwall	Preston
15:00 BST	Wallace 6' (o.g.)	Report	Wallace 22'; Kieftenbeld (yellow card) 31'	Stadium: Deepdale; Attendance: 11,979; Referee: Thomas Bramall

18 April 2022 43	Millwall	2–1	Hull City	Bermondsey
15:00 BST	Ballard (yellow card) 16'; Malone 51'; Bradshaw 55'; Białkowski (yellow card) 87'	Report	Eaves 87'	Stadium: The Den; Attendance: 12,776; Referee: Dean Whitestone

23 April 2022 44	Birmingham City	2–2	Millwall	Bordesley
15:00 BST	Bacuna 47', (yellow card) 90'; Roberts (yellow card) 52'; Taylor (yellow card) 54', (goal) 79' (pen.); Šunjić (yellow card) 86'	Report	Saville (yellow card) 25'; Burke 68'; McNamara (yellow card) 72'; Cooper (yellow card) 74'; Afobe 90+8' (pen.)	Stadium: St Andrew's Trillion Trophy Stadium; Attendance: 17,206; Referee: Leigh Doughty

30 April 2022 45	Millwall	3–0	Peterborough United	Bermondsey
15:00 BST	Afobe 53'; Knight 73' (o.g.); Saville 76'	Report		Stadium: The Den; Attendance: 16,705; Referee: Geoff Eltringham

7 May 2022 46	Bournemouth	1–0	Millwall	Kings Park
12:30 BST	Moore 81'	Report	Kieftenbeld (yellow card) 68'; Saville (yellow card) 82'	Stadium: Vitality Stadium; Attendance: 10,244; Referee: Andre Marriner

=== FA Cup ===
Millwall were drawn at home to Crystal Palace in the third round.

8 January 2022 Third round	Millwall	1–2	Crystal Palace	Bermondsey
12:45 GMT	Afobe 18'; Mitchell (yellow card) 56'	Report	Schlupp (yellow card) 26'; Olise 46'; Mateta 58'; Butland (yellow card) 82'	Stadium: The Den; Attendance: 16,646; Referee: Anthony Taylor

=== EFL Cup ===
Millwall were drawn at home to Portsmouth in the first round Cambridge United in the second round and Leicester City in the third round.

10 August 2021 First round	Millwall	2–1	Portsmouth	Bermondsey
19:45 BST	Malone 21'; Saville 27'; Cooper (yellow card) 49'	Report	Hackett-Fairchild 4', (yellow card) 49'; Johnson (red card) 48'	Stadium: The Den; Attendance: 7,915; Referee: Charles Breakspear

24 August 2021 Second round	Millwall	3–1	Cambridge United	Bermondsey
19:45 BST	Wallace 39', 42'; Smith 54'	Report	Williams 33'	Stadium: The Den; Attendance: 4,005; Referee: Neil Hair

22 September 2021 Third round	Millwall	0–2	Leicester City	Bermondsey
19:45 BST		Report	Lookman 50'; Iheanacho 88'	Stadium: The Den; Attendance: 9,985; Referee: Andrew Madley
