= 2019–20 Millwall F.C. season =

Millwall F.C.
2019–20 season
- Chairman: John Berylson
- Manager: Neil Harris (until 3 October); Gary Rowett (from 21 October)
- Stadium: The Den
- Championship: 8th
- FA Cup: Fourth round (eliminated by Sheffield United)
- EFL Cup: Second round (eliminated by Oxford United)
- Top goalscorer: League: Matt Smith (13 goals); All: Matt Smith (14 goals)
- Highest home attendance: 17,109 (vs. Charlton Athletic)
- Lowest home attendance: 11,769 (vs. Cardiff City)
- Average home league attendance: 13,734
Home colours	Away colours	Third colours

The 2019–20 season was Millwall's 135th year in existence, 93rd consecutive season in The Football League, and 43rd in the second tier. Millwall competed in the Championship, FA Cup, and League Cup. Millwall manager Neil Harris resigned ten games into the season, on 3 October 2019. He was in charge of the club for four and a half years. Gary Rowett took over as manager on 21 October. The Championship season was suspended due to the COVID-19 pandemic on 13 March 2020. After measures were put in place to make playing games safe, such as playing games behind closed doors with no fans, and rounds of testing for players it was decided to restart the season. Millwall resumed against Derby County on 20 June 2020. The season covered the period between 1 July 2019 and 22 July 2020.

== Pre-season ==
On 28 May 2019, The Lions announced their pre-season schedule. A week later a friendly against Spanish side Real Sociedad was confirmed. A training camp in Portugal with a match against Portuguese side SC Braga was also added.

6 July 2019 Friendly	Concord Rangers	0–4	Millwall	Canvey Island
13:00 BST		Report	Williams 33'; Thompson 72'; Leonard 73'; Onyedinma 90'	Stadium: Thames Road

16 July 2019 Friendly	Millwall	1–2	Braga	Albufeira, Portugal
19:00 WEST	O'Brien 36'	Report	Palhinha 18'; Horta 72'	Stadium: Estádio Da Nora

21 July 2019 Friendly	Gillingham	1–2	Millwall	Gillingham
13:00 BST	Trialist 54' (pen.)	Report	Skalák 16'; Mahoney 56'	Stadium: Priestfield Stadium; Referee: Gavin Ward

24 July 2019 Friendly	Southend United	2–1	Millwall	Southend-on-Sea
19:30 BST	Robinson 76', 80'	Report	Ralph 48' (o.g.)	Stadium: Roots Hall; Attendance: 2,070; Referee: John Brooks

27 July 2019 Friendly	Millwall	3–3	Real Sociedad	Bermondsey
14:00 BST	Wallace 20' (pen.); Thompson 49'; Mahoney 83'	Report	Isak 22', 53'; Zurutuza 31'	Stadium: The Den; Attendance: 3,554; Referee: Tim Robinson

== Competitions ==
=== League table ===
Pos	Team	Pld	W	D	L	GF	GA	GD	Pts	Promotion, qualification or relegation
5	Cardiff City	46	19	16	11	68	58	+10	73	Qualification for Championship play-offs (Note: Four teams play for one spot and promotion to the Premier League.)
6	Swansea City	46	18	16	12	62	53	+9	70	Qualification for Championship play-offs
7	Nottingham Forest	46	18	16	12	58	50	+8	70	
8	Millwall	46	17	17	12	57	51	+6	68	
9	Preston North End	46	18	12	16	59	54	+5	66	
10	Derby County	46	17	13	16	62	64	−2	64	
11	Blackburn Rovers	46	17	12	17	66	63	+3	63	

Source: EFL Official Website
Rules for classification: 1) Points; 2) Goal difference; 3) Number of goals scored; 4) Head-to-head results; 5) Wins; 6) Away goals; 7) Penalty points (sec 9.5); 8) 12-point sending off offences

==== Results by matchday ====
Matchday	1	2	3	4	5	6	7	8	9	10	11	12	13	14	15	16	17	18	19	20	21	22	23	24	25	26	27	28	29	30	31	32	33	34	35	36	37	38	39	40	41	42	43	44	45	46
Ground	H	A	H	A	A	H	A	H	A	A	H	A	H	H	A	H	A	H	A	H	A	A	H	A	H	H	A	H	A	A	H	H	A	A	H	H	A	H	A	H	A	H	A	H	A	H
Result	W	D	W	L	D	D	L	L	D	D	W	L	D	W	L	W	W	D	D	D	W	W	L	D	W	W	D	W	L	D	L	D	W	L	D	D	W	L	D	D	W	L	W	W	L	W
Position	9	9	5	9	10	12	15	16	18	19	15	17	17	15	17	15	10	11	13	12	12	11	13	12	11	6	7	7	9	9	10	11	10	11	10	10	7	11	11	11	9	10	9	9	9	8

Updated to match(es) played on 22 July 2020. Source: BBC Sport
A = Away; H = Home; W = Win; D = Draw; L = Loss

==== Result summary ====
Overall								Home						Away					
Pld	W	D	L	GF	GA	GD	Pts	W	D	L	GF	GA	GD	W	D	L	GF	GA	GD
46	17	17	12	57	51	+6	68	10	8	5	33	25	+8	7	9	7	24	26	−2

Last updated: 22 July 2020.
Source: BBC Sport

==== Matches ====
On Thursday, 20 June 2019, the EFL Championship fixtures were revealed.

3 August 2019 1	Millwall	1–0	Preston North End	Bermondsey
15:00 BST	Williams (yellow card) 30'; Wallace 33'; Smith (yellow card) 62'	Report	Hughes (yellow card) 49'; Stockley (yellow card) 64'; Browne (yellow card) 87'	Stadium: The Den; Attendance: 14,923; Referee: Steve Martin

10 August 2019 2	West Bromwich Albion	1–1	Millwall	West Bromwich
15:00 BST	Pearce 57' (o.g.); Ajayi (yellow card) 67'	Report	Wallace (yellow card) 62'; Thompson (yellow card) 69'; Smith 75'	Stadium: The Hawthorns; Attendance: 24,305; Referee: David Webb

17 August 2019 3	Millwall	1–0	Sheffield Wednesday	Bermondsey
15:00 BST	Smith 37'; Wallace (red card) 43'; Romeo (yellow card) 90+2'	Report	Palmer (yellow card) 56'	Stadium: The Den; Attendance: 15,017; Referee: Gavin Ward

21 August 2019 4	Fulham	4–0	Millwall	Fulham
19:45 BST	Cavaleiro 15', 63'; Mitrović (yellow card) 25', (goal) 56' (pen.); Knockaert (yellow card) 28', (goal) 32'	Report	Cooper (yellow card) 25'	Stadium: Craven Cottage; Attendance: 17,066; Referee: Darren Bond

24 August 2019 5	Middlesbrough	1–1	Millwall	Middlesbrough
15:00 BST	McNair 70'	Report	O'Brien (yellow card) 10'; Bradshaw 76'; Leonard (yellow card) 89'	Stadium: Riverside Stadium; Attendance: 19,279; Referee: John Brooks

31 August 2019 6	Millwall	1–1	Hull City	Bermondsey
15:00 BST	Wallace 10' (pen.); Wallace (yellow card) 58'; Jón Daði (yellow card) 90+2'	Report	de Wijs (yellow card) 10'; Grosicki 18'; Bowen (yellow card) 54'; Magennis (yellow card) 84' (yellow-red card) 90+3'; Lichaj (yellow card) 90+2'; Long (yellow card) 90+3'	Stadium: The Den; Attendance: 12,495; Referee: Oliver Langford

14 September 2019 7	Blackburn Rovers	2–0	Millwall	Blackburn
15:00 BST	Williams 18'; Dack 74'	Report	Cooper (yellow card) 56'	Stadium: Ewood Park; Attendance: 11,873; Referee: Dean Whitestone

21 September 2019 8	Millwall	1–2	Queens Park Rangers	Bermondsey
15:00 BST	Thompson (yellow card) 47'; Hutchinson 71' (yellow card) 85'	Report	Cameron (yellow card) 33'; Hugill (yellow card) 51'; Wells 56', 72' (yellow card) 73'	Stadium: The Den; Attendance: 16,808; Referee: Peter Bankes

28 September 2019 9	Huddersfield Town	1–1	Millwall	Huddersfield
15:00 BST	Campbell 24' (yellow card) 81'	Report	Smith 41'; Ferguson (yellow card) 72' (yellow-red card) 80'	Stadium: John Smith’s Stadium; Attendance: 20,781; Referee: Jeremy Simpson

2 October 2019 10	Luton Town	1–1	Millwall	Luton
19:45 BST	McManaman 86'	Report	Bradshaw 60'; Molumby (yellow card) 75'; Wallace (yellow card) 78'	Stadium: Kenilworth Road; Attendance: 10,049; Referee: Darren Bond

5 October 2019 11	Millwall	2–1	Leeds United	Bermondsey
15:00 BST	J. Wallace 16' (pen.); Bradshaw 45'; Ferguson (yellow card) 45+1'; Molumby (yellow card) 50'; M. Wallace (yellow card) 74'; Białkowski (yellow card) 82'	Report	Berardi (red card) 14'; Alioski 46'; Ayling (yellow card) 59'	Stadium: The Den; Attendance: 16,311; Referee: James Linington

19 October 2019 12	Brentford	3–2	Millwall	Brentford
15:00 BST	Watkins (penalty missed) 24' (yellow card) 54' (goal) 90+4'; Mbeumo (yellow card) 63' (goal) 88'; Da Silva 84'; Jeanvier (yellow card) 90+3'	Report	Hutchinson (yellow card) 23'; M. Wallace (yellow card) 33'; Bradshaw 45+4'; J. Wallace 55' (pen.) (yellow card) 90+1'; Molumby (yellow card) 64'; Thompson (yellow card) 90+3'; Romeo (yellow card) 90+7'	Stadium: Griffin Park; Attendance: 10,886; Referee: Stuart Attwell

22 October 2019 13	Millwall	2–2	Cardiff City	Bermondsey
19:45 BST	Bradshaw 45', 77'; Cooper (yellow card) 77'	Report	Ward 12'; Hoilett 57'; Bennett (yellow card) 65'	Stadium: The Den; Attendance: 11,769; Referee: Tim Robinson

26 October 2019 14	Millwall	2–0	Stoke City	Bermondsey
15:00 BST	Thompson 28'; Ferguson (yellow card) 45'; Wallace 75' (pen.)	Report		Stadium: The Den; Attendance: 14,008; Referee: Darren England

2 November 2019 15	Reading	2–1	Millwall	Reading
15:00 GMT	Obita 9'; Baldock 37'; Yiadom (yellow card) 41'	Report	Wallace 63'	Stadium: Madejski Stadium; Attendance: 14,485; Referee: Tony Harrington

9 November 2019 16	Millwall	2–1	Charlton Athletic	Bermondsey
15:00 GMT	Hutchinson 6'; Molumby (yellow card) 45'; Smith 90+1'	Report	Pratley (yellow card) 41'; Leko 51'	Stadium: The Den; Attendance: 17,109; Referee: Robert Jones

23 November 2019 17	Swansea City	0–1	Millwall	Swansea
15:00 GMT	van der Hoorn (yellow card) 64'	Report	J. Wallace 65'; Skalák (yellow card) 84'; M. Wallace (yellow card) 90'	Stadium: Liberty Stadium; Attendance: 16,840; Referee: Andy Davies

26 November 2019 18	Millwall	2–2	Wigan Athletic	Bermondsey
19:45 GMT	Hutchinson 24' (yellow card) 63'; Smith 60'; Romeo (yellow card) 79'	Report	Pilkington 3'; Macleod (yellow card) 43'; Robinson 56'	Stadium: The Den; Attendance: 10,021; Referee: Dean Whitestone

30 November 2019 19	Birmingham City	1–1	Millwall	Bordesley
15:00 GMT	Clarke-Salter 79'	Report	Williams 61'	Stadium: St Andrew's Trillion Trophy Stadium; Attendance: 19,715; Referee: Andy Woolmer

6 December 2019 20	Millwall	2–2	Nottingham Forest	Bermondsey
19:45 GMT	Williams 15'; Thompson (yellow card) 32'; O'Brien 90+2'	Report	Cash (yellow card) 30'; Grabban 63', 88'; Silva (yellow card) 66'	Stadium: The Den; Attendance: 12,976; Referee: John Brooks

10 December 2019 21	Bristol City	1–2	Millwall	Ashton Gate
19:45 GMT	O'Dowda 84'	Report	Wallace 11'; Cooper 70'	Stadium: Ashton Gate Stadium; Attendance: 19,742; Referee: Gavin Ward

14 December 2019 22	Derby County	0–1	Millwall	Derby
15:00 GMT	Martin (yellow card) 57'	Report	Bradshaw 25'; Romeo (yellow card) 90+3'; Cooper (yellow card) 90+3'	Stadium: Pride Park Stadium; Attendance: 26,272; Referee: Chris Kavanagh

21 December 2019 23	Millwall	1–2	Barnsley	Bermondsey
15:00 GMT	Wallace (yellow card) 75'; O'Brien 85'; Molumby (yellow card) 88'	Report	Andersen (yellow card) 23'; Chaplin 39'; Woodrow (yellow card) 82'; Diaby (yellow card) 85'; Halme (yellow card) 86'; Schmidt 90+4'	Stadium: The Den; Attendance: 12,682; Referee: Jarred Gillett

26 December 2019 24	Cardiff City	1–1	Millwall	Cardiff
15:00 GMT	Flint 59'; Hoilett (yellow card) 81'	Report	Wallace 63'	Stadium: Cardiff City Stadium; Attendance: 23,583; Referee: David Webb

29 December 2019 25	Millwall	1–0	Brentford	Bermondsey
15:00 GMT	O'Brien 8'; J. Wallace (yellow card) 23'; M. Wallace (yellow card) 51'; Williams (yellow card) 70'	Report	Benrahma (yellow card) 45+2'	Stadium: The Den; Attendance: 15,464; Referee: Robert Jones

1 January 2020 26	Millwall	3–1	Luton Town	Bermondsey
12:45 GMT	Bradshaw 69'; Mahoney 78'; Smith 81'	Report	Bradley 41'	Stadium: The Den; Attendance: 12,134; Referee: Stephen Martin

11 January 2020 27	Stoke City	0–0	Millwall	Stoke-on-Trent
15:00 GMT	Lindsay (yellow card) 45+1'	Report	Williams (red card) 85'; Smith (yellow card) 89'	Stadium: bet365 Stadium; Attendance: 22,515; Referee: Jeremy Simpson

18 January 2020 28	Millwall	2–0	Reading	Bermondsey
15:00 GMT	Bradshaw (yellow card) 19'; Smith 71'; Böðvarsson 82'	Report	Adam (yellow card) 33'; Ejaria (yellow card) 70'; Morrison (yellow card) 80'	Stadium: The Den; Attendance: 14,011; Referee: Keith Stroud

25 January 2020	Leeds United	v	Millwall	Leeds
15:00 GMT		Report		Stadium: Elland Road
Note: Fixture was postponed due to Millwall's FA Cup progression.

28 January 2020 29	Leeds United	3–2	Millwall	Leeds
19:45 GMT	Bamford 48', 66' (yellow card) 90+5'; Hernández 62' (yellow card) 64'	Report	Hutchinson 4'; Wallace 23' (pen.); Woods (yellow card) 26'	Stadium: Elland Road; Attendance: 34,006; Referee: Darren England

1 February 2020 30	Sheffield Wednesday	0–0	Millwall	Owlerton, Sheffield
15:00 GMT	Reach (yellow card) 23'; Bannan (yellow card) 32'; Iorfa (yellow card) 53'; Odubajo (yellow card) 90+2'	Report	Williams (yellow card) 18'; Wallace (yellow card) 49'; Cooper (yellow card) 62'	Stadium: Hillsborough; Attendance: 23,052; Referee: David Coote

9 February 2020 31	Millwall	0–2	West Bromwich Albion	Bermondsey
13:30 GMT	Smith (yellow card) 23'; Böðvarsson (yellow card) 90+2'	Report	Krovinović 42'; Robinson (yellow card) 50'; O'Shea 84' (yellow card) 90+2'	Stadium: The Den; Attendance: 13,818; Referee: Gavin Ward

12 February 2020 32	Millwall	1–1	Fulham	Bermondsey
19:45 GMT	Böðvarsson 8'; Wallace (penalty missed) 22'; Woods (yellow card) 25'	Report	Mitrović 3'; Cairney (yellow card) 61'; Arter (yellow card) 81'	Stadium: The Den; Attendance: 12,870 referee = Andrew Madley

15 February 2020 33	Preston North End	0–1	Millwall	Preston
15:00 GMT	Johnson (yellow card) 50'; Pearson (yellow card) 83'; Gallagher (yellow card) 85'	Report	Hutchinson 78'	Stadium: Deepdale; Attendance: 12,468; Referee: Tony Harrington

22 February 2020 34	Wigan Athletic	1–0	Millwall	Wigan
15:00 GMT	Hutchinson 57' (o.g.); Kipré (yellow card) 89'	Report	J. Wallace (yellow card) 2'; Molumby (yellow card) 37'; M. Wallace (yellow card) 43'	Stadium: DW Stadium; Attendance: 9,639; Referee: Jeremy Simpson

26 February 2020 35	Millwall	0–0	Birmingham City	Bermondsey
19:45 GMT	Romeo (yellow card) 80'	Report		Stadium: The Den; Attendance: 11,209; Referee: David Webb

29 February 2020 36	Millwall	1–1	Bristol City	Bermondsey
15:00 GMT	Smith 51'; Molumby (yellow card) 83'	Report	Pereira 10'	Stadium: The Den; Attendance: 13,584; Referee: Andy Davies

6 March 2020 37	Nottingham Forest	0–3	Millwall	West Bridgford
19:45 GMT	Samba (yellow card) 79'	Report	Smith 20', 26', 33'; Cooper (yellow card) 87'	Stadium: City Ground; Attendance: 27,307; Referee: Geoff Eltringham

20 June 2020 38	Millwall	2–3	Derby County	Bermondsey
13:00 BST	Smith 15'; Böðvarsson 90+3'	Report	Sibley 26', 71', 90', (yellow card) 89'; Waghorn (yellow card) 38'	Stadium: The Den; Attendance: 0 Referee: Steve Martin
Note: Season was suspended until 3 April, due to the COVID-19 pandemic. The match was rescheduled to 20 June.

27 June 2020 39	Barnsley	0–0	Millwall	Barnsley
13:00 BST	Williams (yellow card) 72'; Brown (yellow card) 89'	Report	Bennett (yellow card) 72'; Molumby (yellow card) 72'	Stadium: Oakwell; Attendance: 0 Referee: Jeremy Simpson
Note: Season was suspended until 3 April, due to the COVID-19 pandemic. The match was rescheduled to 27 June.

30 June 2020 40	Millwall	1–1	Swansea City	Bermondsey
17:00 BST	Hutchinson (yellow card) 5'; Bennett 21'; Wallace (yellow card) 70'	Report	Byers (yellow card) 25'; Białkowski 66' (o.g.)	Stadium: The Den; Attendance: 0 Referee: James Linington
Note: Season was suspended until 3 April, due to the COVID-19 pandemic. The match was rescheduled to 30 June.

3 July 2020 41	Charlton Athletic	0–1	Millwall	Charlton
20:15 BST	Oshilaja (yellow card) 43'; Pearce (yellow card) 79'; Lockyer (yellow card) 90+4'	Report	Molumby (yellow card) 30'; Cooper (yellow card) 35', (goal) 81'	Stadium: The Valley; Attendance: 0 Referee: Dean Whitestone
Note: On 3 April, the English Football League decided to postpone all football until safe to do so due to the COVID-19 pandemic. The match was rescheduled to 3 July.

8 July 2020 42	Millwall	0–2	Middlesbrough	Bermondsey
19:45 BST	Cooper (yellow card) 86'	Report	Assombalonga (yellow card) 66', (goal) 68'; Saville (yellow card) 70'; Fletcher 87' (pen.); Howson (yellow card) 90+2'	Stadium: The Den; Attendance: 0 Referee: Tim Robinson
Note: On 3 April, the English Football League decided to postpone all football until safe to do so due to the COVID-19 pandemic. The match was rescheduled to 8 July.

11 July 2020 43	Hull City	0–1	Millwall	Kingston upon Hull
15:00 BST	Stewart (yellow card) 40'; Honeyman (yellow card) 45+1'	Report	Leonard 2'	Stadium: KCOM Stadium; Attendance: 0 Referee: Matt Donohue
Note: On 3 April, the English Football League decided to postpone all football until safe to do so due to the COVID-19 pandemic. The match was rescheduled to 11 July.

14 July 2020 44	Millwall	1–0	Blackburn Rovers	Bermondsey
19:45 BST	Bennett 20'; Woods (yellow card) 84'; Cooper (yellow card) 89'	Report	Rankin-Costello (yellow card) 1'; Travis (yellow card) 35'	Stadium: The Den; Attendance: 0 Referee: John Brooks
Note: On 3 April, the English Football League decided to postpone all football until safe to do so due to the COVID-19 pandemic. The match was rescheduled to 14 July.

18 July 2020 45	Queens Park Rangers	4–3	Millwall	Shepherd's Bush
15:00 BST	Masterson 43'; Manning 52'; Eze 62'; Kane 73'	Report	Cooper (yellow card) 20'; Smith 49'; Hutchinson 67'; Molumby 90+4'	Stadium: Loftus Road; Attendance: 0 Referee: James Linington
Note: On 3 April, the English Football League decided to postpone all football until safe to do so due to the COVID-19 pandemic. The match was rescheduled to 18 July.

22 July 2020 46	Millwall	4–1	Huddersfield Town	Bermondsey
19:30 BST	Mahoney 4'; Thompson (yellow card) 40'; Cooper 47'; Skalák 63'; Böðvarsson 79'	Report	Grant 36'	Stadium: The Den; Attendance: 0 Referee: Keith Stroud
Note: On 3 April, the English Football League decided to postpone all football until safe to do so due to the COVID-19 pandemic. The match was rescheduled to 22 July.

=== FA Cup ===
The third round draw was made live on BBC Two from Etihad Stadium, Micah Richards and Tony Adams conducted the draw. The fourth round draw was made by Alex Scott and David O'Leary on Monday, 6 January.

4 January 2020 Third round	Millwall	3–0	Newport County	Bermondsey
12:31 GMT	Smith 7'; Mahoney 64' (pen.); Bradshaw 82'	Report		Stadium: The Den; Attendance: 6,009; Referee: Tony Harrington

25 January 2020 Fourth round	Millwall	0–2	Sheffield United	Bermondsey
15:00 GMT		Report	Bešić 62'; Freeman (yellow card) 69'; Norwood 84'	Stadium: The Den; Attendance: 12,653; Referee: Anthony Taylor

=== EFL Cup ===
The first round draw was made on 20 June. The second round draw was made on 13 August 2019 following the conclusion of all but one first-round matches.

13 August 2019 First round	West Bromwich Albion	1–2	Millwall	West Bromwich
20:00 BST	Austin 9'	Report	Bradshaw 28'; O'Brien 55'; Hutchinson (yellow card) 68'; Thompson (yellow card) 90'	Stadium: The Hawthorns; Referee: Ross Joyce

27 August 2019 Second round	Oxford United	2–2 (4–2 p)	Millwall	Oxford
19:45 BST	Sykes (yellow card) 58', (goal) 87'; Mousinho (yellow card) 69'; Hanson (yellow card) 73'; Berkoe (yellow card) 80'; Henry 90+4' (pen.)	Report	Böðvarsson 29', 52'	Stadium: Kassam Stadium; Attendance: 3,693; Referee: Craig Hicks
	Penalties
	Thorne (penalty scored); Woodburn (penalty scored); Henry (penalty scored); Mousinho (penalty scored)		(penalty scored) McCarthy; (penalty missed) Böðvarsson; (penalty missed) Ferguson; (penalty scored) Williams

== Squad ==
No.	Name	Pos.	Nat.	Place of Birth	Age	Apps	Goals	Signed from	Date signed	Fee	Ends
Goalkeepers
1	Frank Fielding	GK	(England)	Blackburn	32	1	0	Bristol City	1 July 2019	Free	Undisclosed
14	Luke Steele	GK	(England)	Peterborough	35	2	0	Nottingham Forest	8 August 2019	Loan	2020
33	Bartosz Białkowski	GK	(Poland)	Braniewo	32	48	0	Ipswich Town	27 January 2020	£350,000,00	Undisclosed
Defenders
3	Murray Wallace	CB/LB	(Scotland)	Glasgow	27	74	4	Scunthorpe United	1 July 2018	Undisclosed	Undisclosed
4	Shaun Hutchinson	CB	(England)	Newcastle upon Tyne	29	137	11	Fulham	1 July 2016	Free	Undisclosed
5	Jake Cooper	CB	(England)	Ascot	25	160	16	Reading	28 July 2017	Undisclosed	Undisclosed
12	Mahlon Romeo	RB	(Antigua and Barbuda) (England)	Westminster	24	180	3	Gillingham	5 May 2015	Free	Undisclosed
15	Alex Pearce	CB	(Republic of Ireland) (Scotland) (England)	Wallingford	31	46	1	Derby County	1 July 2019	Free	Undisclosed
17	James Brown	DF	(England)	Dover	22	3	0	Academy	7 April 2016	Trainee	Undisclosed
Midfielders
6	Shaun Williams	DM	(Republic of Ireland)	Dublin	33	266	22	Milton Keynes Dons	27 January 2014	Undisclosed	2021
7	Jed Wallace	RM/AM	(England)	Reading	26	174	26	Wolverhampton Wanderers	1 July 2017	Undisclosed	Undisclosed
8	Ben Thompson	CM	(England)	Sidcup	24	136	9	Academy	1 July 2014	Trainee	Undisclosed
11	Shane Ferguson	LM/LB	(Northern Ireland)	Derry	28	201	12	Newcastle United	26 January 2016	Undisclosed	Undisclosed
16	Jayson Molumby	CM	(Republic of Ireland)	Waterford	20	40	1	Brighton & Hove Albion	23 July 2019	Loan	2020
18	Ryan Leonard	CM	(England)	Plympton	28	58	3	Sheffield United	1 January 2019	£1,500,000	Undisclosed
19	Ryan Woods	CM	(England)	Norton Canes	26	18	0	Stoke City	17 January 2020	Loan	2020
20	Mason Bennett	LM/RM/CF	(England)	Langwith	23	9	2	Derby County	31 January 2020	Loan	2020
21	Connor Mahoney	LM/RM/AM	(England)	Blackburn	23	40	4	A.F.C. Bournemouth	9 July 2019	Undisclosed	Undisclosed
26	Jiří Skalák	LW	(Czech Republic)	Pardubice	28	33	3	Brighton & Hove Albion	2 August 2018	£850,000	Undisclosed
32	Tyler Burey	AM/CF/LM/RM	(England)	Doncaster	19	0	0	AFC Wimbledon	1 July 2019	Free	Undisclosed
42	Billy Mitchell	CM	(England)	London	19	11	0	Academy	1 August 2018	Trainee	Undisclosed
Forwards
9	Tom Bradshaw	CF	(Wales)	Cardiff	34	57	10	Barnlsey	1 January 2019	£1,250,000	Undisclosed
10	Matt Smith	CF	(England)	Birmingham	31	43	13	Queens Park Rangers	1 July 2019	Undisclosed	Undisclosed
22	Aiden O'Brien	CF/AM/LM	(Republic of Ireland) (England)	Islington	26	226	44	Academy	1 August 2011	Trainee	2020
23	Jón Daði Böðvarsson	CF	(Iceland)	Selfoss	28	35	5	Reading	12 July 2019	Undisclosed	Undisclosed

=== Statistics ===
As of 22 July 2020

No.	Pos	Nat	Player	Total		Championship		FA Cup		League Cup	
No.	Pos	Nat	Player	Apps	Goals	Apps	Goals	Apps	Goals	Apps	Goals
1	GK	(England) ENG	Frank Fielding	1	0	1+0	0	0+0	0	0+0	0
2	DF	(England) ENG	Jason McCarthy	5	0	1+1	0	1+0	0	2+0	0
3	DF	(Scotland) SCO	Murray Wallace	47	0	38+5	0	2+0	0	1+1	0
4	DF	(England) ENG	Shaun Hutchinson	38	6	36+0	6	0+0	0	2+0	0
5	DF	(England) ENG	Jake Cooper	49	4	46+0	4	2+0	0	1+0	0
6	MF	(Republic of Ireland) IRL	Shaun Williams	35	2	29+4	2	0+0	0	1+1	0
7	MF	(England) ENG	Jed Wallace	43	10	42+0	10	0+1	0	0+0	0
8	MF	(England) ENG	Ben Thompson	30	1	20+8	1	0+0	0	0+2	0
9	FW	(Wales) WAL	Tom Bradshaw	48	10	29+16	8	0+2	1	1+0	1
10	FW	(England) ENG	Matt Smith	43	13	20+21	12	2+0	1	0+0	0
11	MF	(Northern Ireland) NIR	Shane Ferguson	32	0	19+9	0	1+1	0	2+0	0
12	DF	(Antigua and Barbuda) ATG	Mahlon Romeo	44	0	43+0	0	0+0	0	0+1	0
14	GK	(England) ENG	Luke Steele	2	0	0+0	0	0+0	0	2+0	0
15	DF	(Republic of Ireland) IRL	Alex Pearce	31	0	28+1	0	2+0	0	0+0	0
16	MF	(Republic of Ireland) IRL	Jayson Molumby	40	1	31+5	1	2+0	0	2+0	0
17	DF	(England) ENG	James Brown	3	0	1+0	0	1+1	0	0+0	0
18	MF	(England) ENG	Ryan Leonard	18	1	13+4	1	0+0	0	1+0	0
19	MF	(England) ENG	Ryan Woods	18	0	17+1	0	0+0	0	0+0	0
20	MF	(England) ENG	Mason Bennett	9	2	7+2	2	0+0	0	0+0	0
21	MF	(England) ENG	Connor Mahoney	40	4	14+24	3	2+0	1	0+0	0
22	FW	(Republic of Ireland) IRL	Aiden O'Brien	21	4	8+10	3	1+0	0	2+0	1
23	FW	(Iceland) ISL	Jón Daði Böðvarsson	35	5	13+18	3	1+1	0	2+0	2
26	MF	(Czech Republic) CZE	Jiří Skalák	14	1	4+8	1	1+0	0	1+0	0
32	MF	(England) ENG	Tyler Burey	1	0	0+1	0	0+0	0	0+0	0
33	GK	(Poland) POL	Bartosz Białkowski	48	0	45+1	0	2+0	0	0+0	0
42	MF	(England) ENG	Billy Mitchell	10	0	1+6	0	2+0	0	1+0	0
45	MF	(England) ENG	Hayden Muller	1	0	0+1	0	0+0	0	0+0	0
Players who left the club:
19	FW	(England) ENG	Tom Elliott	1	0	0+0	0	0+0	0	1+0	0

==== Goals record ====
As of 18 July 2020

Rank	No.	Nat.	Po.	Name	Championship	FA Cup	League Cup	Total
1	10	(England)	CF	Matt Smith	13	1	0	14
2	7	(England)	RM	Jed Wallace	10	0	0	10
2	9	(Wales)	CF	Tom Bradshaw	8	1	1	10
4	4	(England)	CB	Shaun Hutchinson	6	0	0	6
5	23	(Iceland)	CF	Jón Daði Böðvarsson	3	0	2	5
6	5	(England)	CB	Jake Cooper	4	0	0	4
6	22	(Republic of Ireland)	CF	Aiden O'Brien	3	0	1	4
6	21	(England)	LM	Connor Mahoney	3	1	0	4
9	6	(Republic of Ireland)	DM	Shaun Williams	2	0	0	2
9	20	(England)	LM	Mason Bennett	2	0	0	2
11	8	(England)	CM	Ben Thompson	1	0	0	1
11	18	(England)	CM	Ryan Leonard	1	0	0	1
13	26	(Czech Republic)	LW	Jiří Skalák	1	0	0	1
13	Total				56	3	4	63

=== Disciplinary record ===
As of 22 July 2020

Rank	No.	Nat.	Po.	Name	Championship			FA Cup			League Cup			Total		
Rank	No.	Nat.	Po.	Name	Booked	(yellow card) (yellow-red card)	Sent off (straight red)	Booked	(yellow card) (yellow-red card)	Sent off (straight red)	Booked	(yellow card) (yellow-red card)	Sent off (straight red)	Booked	(yellow card) (yellow-red card)	Sent off (straight red)
1	5	(England)	CB	Jake Cooper	11	0	0	0	0	0	0	0	0	11	0	0
2	16	(Republic of Ireland)	CM	Jayson Molumby	9	0	0	0	0	0	0	0	0	9	0	0
3	7	(England)	RM	Jed Wallace	7	0	1	0	0	0	0	0	0	7	0	1
4	3	(Scotland)	CB	Murray Wallace	6	0	0	0	0	0	0	0	0	6	0	0
4	8	(England)	CM	Ben Thompson	5	0	0	0	0	0	1	0	0	6	0	0
6	4	(England)	CB	Shaun Hutchinson	4	0	0	0	0	0	1	0	0	5	0	0
6	12	(Antigua and Barbuda)	RB	Mahlon Romeo	5	0	0	0	0	0	0	0	0	5	0	0
8	6	(Republic of Ireland)	DM	Shaun Williams	3	0	1	0	0	0	0	0	0	3	0	1
8	11	(Northern Ireland)	LM	Shane Ferguson	2	1	0	0	0	0	0	0	0	2	1	0
10	10	(England)	CF	Matt Smith	3	0	0	0	0	0	0	0	0	3	0	0
10	19	(England)	CM	Ryan Woods	3	0	0	0	0	0	0	0	0	3	0	0
12	23	(Iceland)	CF	Jón Daði Böðvarsson	2	0	0	0	0	0	0	0	0	2	0	0
13	9	(Wales)	CF	Tom Bradshaw	1	0	0	0	0	0	0	0	0	1	0	0
13	18	(England)	CM	Ryan Leonard	1	0	0	0	0	0	0	0	0	1	0	0
13	20	(England)	LM	Mason Bennett	1	0	0	0	0	0	0	0	0	1	0	0
13	22	(Republic of Ireland)	CF	Aiden O'Brien	1	0	0	0	0	0	0	0	0	1	0	0
13	26	(Czech Republic)	RW	Jiří Skalák	1	0	0	0	0	0	0	0	0	1	0	0
13	33	(Poland)	GK	Bartosz Białkowski	1	0	0	0	0	0	0	0	0	1	0	0
13	42	(England)	CM	Billy Mitchell	1	0	0	0	0	0	0	0	0	1	0	0
Total					68	1	2	0	0	0	2	0	0	70	1	2

== Transfers ==
=== Transfers in ===
Date	Position	Nationality	Name	From	Fee	Ref.
1 July 2019	MF	(England)	Tyler Burey	(England) AFC Wimbledon	Compensation	
1 July 2019	GK	(England)	Frank Fielding	(England) Bristol City	Free transfer	
1 July 2019	CB	(Republic of Ireland)	Alex Pearce	(England) Derby County	Free transfer	
1 July 2019	CB	(England)	Harry Ransom	(England) Eastbourne Borough	Undisclosed	
1 July 2019	CF	(England)	Matt Smith	(England) Queens Park Rangers	£500,000	
9 July 2019	AM	(England)	Connor Mahoney	(England) A.F.C. Bournemouth	£1,100,000	
12 July 2019	CF	(Iceland)	Jón Daði Böðvarsson	(England) Reading	£750,000	
24 July 2019	CF	(England)	Harvey Bradbury	(England) Oxford United	Free transfer	
30 July 2019	RB	(England)	Jason McCarthy	(England) Wycombe Wanderers	£250,000	
1 August 2019	DF	(England)	Dan Moss	(England) Burnley	Free transfer	
27 January 2020	GK	(Poland)	Bartosz Białkowski	(England) Ipswich Town	£900,000	

=== Loans in ===
Date from	Position	Nationality	Name	From	Date until	Ref.
23 July 2019	CM	(Republic of Ireland)	Jayson Molumby	(England) Brighton & Hove Albion	30 June 2020	
30 July 2019	GK	(Poland)	Bartosz Białkowski	(England) Ipswich Town	27 January 2020	
8 August 2019	GK	(England)	Luke Steele	(England) Nottingham Forest	January 2020	
17 January 2020	DM	(England)	Ryan Woods	(England) Stoke City	30 June 2020	
30 January 2020	SS	(England)	Mason Bennett	(England) Derby County	30 June 2020	
31 January 2020	GK	(England)	Luke Steele	(England) Nottingham Forest	30 June 2020	

=== Loans out ===
Date from	Position	Nationality	Name	To	Date until	Ref.
1 July 2019	CF	(Wales)	Steve Morison	(England) Shrewsbury Town	8 August 2019	
31 July 2019	RB	(Republic of Ireland)	Danny McNamara	(Wales) Newport County	30 June 2020	
21 August 2019	GK	(England)	Ryan Sandford	(England) Dorking Wanderers	18 September 2019	
13 September 2019	DF	(England)	Jesse Debrah	(England) Eastbourne Borough	11 October 2019	
27 November 2019	GK	(England)	Joe Wright	(England) Walton Casuals	25 December 2019	
1 January 2020	DF	(England)	Jesse Debrah	(England) Dulwich Hamlet	29 January 2020	
18 January 2020	RB	(England)	Jason McCarthy	(England) Wycombe Wanderers	30 June 2020	
31 January 2020	CF	(England)	Harvey Bradbury	(England) Morecambe	30 June 2020	
5 February 2020	CF	(England)	Isaac Olaofe	(England) Sutton United	25 April 2020	
21 February 2020	DF	(England)	Junior Tiensia	(England) Havant & Waterlooville	30 June 2020	

=== Transfers out ===
Date	Position	Nationality	Name	To	Fee	Ref.
1 July 2019	GK	(Scotland)	Jordan Archer	(England) Oxford United	Released	
1 July 2019	CM	(England)	Harry Donovan	(England) Braintree Town	Released	
1 July 2019	LW	(England)	Samuel Edozie	(England) Manchester City	£600,000	
1 July 2019	CF	(England)	Lee Gregory	(England) Stoke City	Rejected contract	
1 July 2019	CM	(England)	Jethro Hanson	Free agent	Released	
1 July 2019	MF	(England)	Rob Harvey	Free agent	Released	
1 July 2019	GK	(England)	Tom King	(Wales) Newport County	Released	
1 July 2019	GK	(England)	David Martin	(England) West Ham United	Free transfer	
1 July 2019	RB	(Northern Ireland)	Conor McLaughlin	(England) Sunderland	Released	
1 July 2019	CB	(England)	Sid Nelson	(England) Tranmere Rovers	Released	
1 July 2019	CB	(England)	Mich'el Parker	Free agent	Released	
1 July 2019	MF	(England)	Mason Saunders-Henry	(England) Whyteleafe	Released	
1 July 2019	CB	(Serbia)	Lazar Stojsavljević	(Wales) Newport County	Released	
1 July 2019	CM	(England)	Ryan Tunnicliffe	(England) Luton Town	Released	
1 July 2019	MF	(England)	Lewis White	(England) Dulwich Hamlet	Released	
1 July 2019	MF	(England)	Joe Wicks	Free agent	Released	
30 July 2019	RM	(Nigeria)	Fred Onyedinma	(England) Wycombe Wanderers	Undisclosed	
31 July 2019	LB	(Australia)	James Meredith	(Australia) Perth Glory	Mutual consent	
8 August 2019	CF	(Wales)	Steve Morison	(England) Shrewsbury Town	Undisclosed	
9 January 2020	CF	(England)	Tom Elliott	(England) Salford City	Released	
