= Jed Wallace =

English footballer

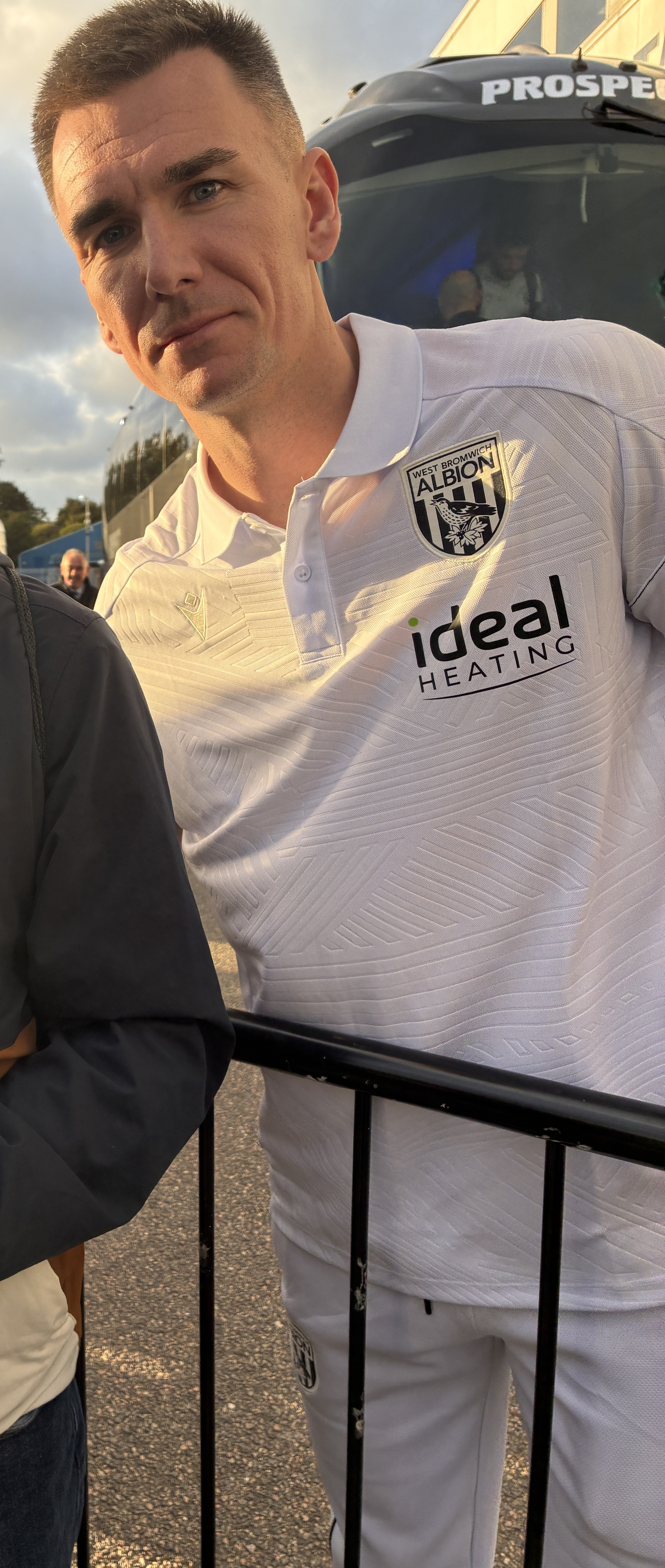
- Wallace with West Bromwich Albion in 2025.

Personal information
- Full name: Jed Fernley Wallace
- Date of birth: 26 March 1994 (age 32)
- Place of birth: Reading, England
- Height: 5 ft 10 in (1.79 m)
- Position: Right winger

Team information
- Current team: Bristol City
- Number: 17

Youth career
- Darby Green & Potley F.C.
- 2008–2010: Carshalton Athletic
- 2010–2011: Farnborough
- 2011: Lewes
- 2011–2012: Portsmouth

Senior career*
Years	Team	Apps	(Gls)
2012–2015	Portsmouth	110	(27)
2012	→ Farnborough (loan)	6	(0)
2012	→ Whitehawk (loan)	11	(8)
2015–2017	Wolverhampton Wanderers	18	(0)
2016	→ Millwall (loan)	12	(1)
2017	→ Millwall (loan)	16	(3)
2017–2022	Millwall	211	(38)
2022–2026	West Bromwich Albion	140	(15)
2026–	Bristol City	9	(0)

International career
2013	England U19	1	(0)
- * Club domestic league appearances and goals as of 16 October 2026 (UTC)

Jed Fernley Wallace (born 26 March 1994) is an English professional footballer who plays as a right winger for EFL Championship club Bristol City.

Beginning in non-League football, Wallace broke into Portsmouth's first team in 2013, going on to become a regular player for them and being named in the League Two PFA Team of the Year as well as winning the Portsmouth Player of the Season award in 2014–15 before moving to Wolverhampton Wanderers. After struggling to break into the first-team, he moved to Millwall after two loan spells with the club. He spent five seasons with Millwall permanently before joining West Bromwich Albion in 2022. In July 2026, he signed a 2 year deal with EFL Championship side Bristol City.

== Career ==
=== Youth and non-League football ===
Born in Reading, Berkshire, Wallace was educated at Frogmore Community College. He began his career playing for youth club Darby Green (now known as Darby Green & Potley F.C.) and Carshalton Athletic's youth team, before signing with Farnborough. At Farnborough, he appeared on the bench on 29 January 2011, in a match against Havant & Waterlooville. However, he did not enter the field. In August 2011, he signed for Lewes, following his manager at Farnborough, Steve King. Wallace played in three friendly matches for Lewes, before then signing a two-year professional contract (with an option of a further year) with Portsmouth.

=== Portsmouth ===
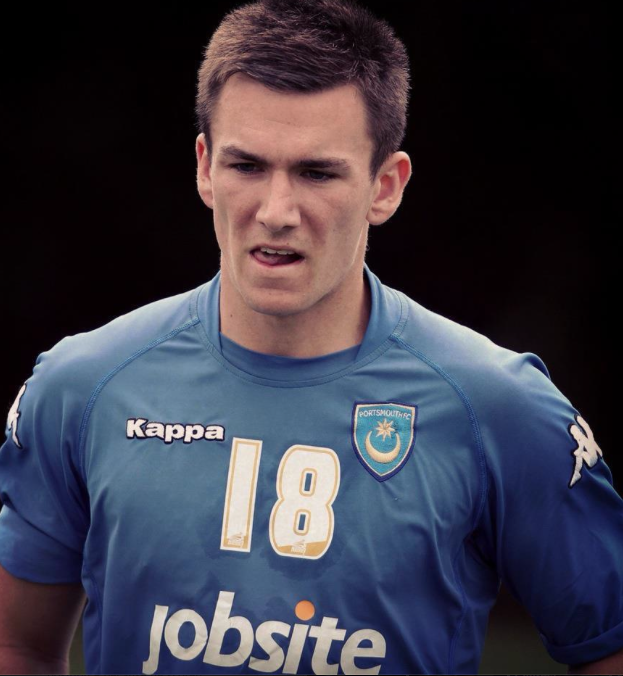
Wallace with Portsmouth in 2012.

Wallace progressed through Portsmouth's reserve and academy. On 20 March 2012, Wallace returned to Farnborough on a one-month loan deal, making his debut the following day in a match against Dover Athletic in the first of six appearances for the club. Having returned to Portsmouth in April 2012, he appeared on the bench for the first time, in a loss at Nottingham Forest.

The start of the 2012–13 season saw Wallace make his senior Portsmouth debut as he started a League Cup 3–0 defeat against Plymouth Argyle on 14 August 2012. After no further first team appearances over the following weeks, he was loaned to Isthmian League side Whitehawk for a month in October 2012 to gain playing time. After scoring on his debut, in a 3–1 win over Wingate & Finchley, he netted his first a hat-trick in a 5–0 win against Merstham a few weeks later. His loan ended in mid-November but was then renewed several times over the following weeks.

On Christmas Eve 2012, Wallace was recalled from loan and named as a substitute against Yeovil. He made his league debut on 1 January 2013, coming on as a substitute in a 5–0 defeat at Swindon. He scored his first goal for the club in the first match he started for them, a 3–1 home defeat against Hartlepool United on 26 January. He finished the season with six goals, but could not prevent Pompey dropping into League Two, upon which the club exercised the one-year contract extension in Wallace's deal.

After beginning the 2013–14 season in the first team, Wallace found himself often dropped to the bench after the arrival of Richie Barker as manager. Wallace turned down two offers of a new contract from Portsmouth, and in November 2013 his teammate David Connolly revealed that clubs were submitting bids for him. In January 2014, Wallace turned down another offer from Pompey, but the club rejected a reported £250,000 bid from Peterborough. Having returned to being a regular starting player after the dismissal of Barker and appointment of former academy manager Andy Awford as manager, Wallace re-entered contract talks at the end of the season. In June 2014, Wallace signed a new three-year deal.

Despite this new contract, Wallace continued to be linked to moves, with speculation that Brighton were interested in him, but no official bid was ultimately entered. He ended the 2014–15 season as the club's top goalscorer with 17 goals, also winning him the club's Player of the Season Award. He was also included in the League Two PFA Team of the Year.

=== Wolverhampton Wanderers ===
On 21 May 2015, Wallace signed a three-year deal with Championship club Wolverhampton Wanderers for an undisclosed fee.

On 8 January 2016, Wallace joined League One club Millwall on a month-long-loan, making his debut for the Lions the following day, against Oldham. Wallace's first assist for the Lions came on 17 January 2016, in a League One tie against Port Vale at The Den. The assist came only 14 minutes into the game, with a sublime cross that found the head of Lee Gregory who finished first time, placing it past The Valiants' goalkeeper Jak Alnwick. He scored his first goal for Millwall in a 3–0 win over Blackpool on 5 March 2016.

Upon his return to Wolves he scored his first goal for the club in a 2–1 EFL Cup win against Cambridge United on 23 August 2016.

On 19 January 2017 Wallace was again loaned to Millwall from Wolverhampton Wanderers, this time until the end of the season with a view to a permanent move when the loan period expires. He played in the 2017 EFL League One play-off final as Millwall beat Bradford City at Wembley Stadium to earn promotion to the Championship.

=== Millwall ===
On 26 June 2017, Millwall announced the permanent signing of Wallace on a 3-year deal for an undisclosed fee following 2 loan spells at the club.

=== West Bromwich Albion ===
On 23 June 2022, West Bromwich Albion announced the permanent signing of Wallace on a 4-year deal on a free transfer after his contract ran out at his previous club. He made his debut on 30 July 2022 in a 1–1 away draw at Middlesbrough, providing an assist for fellow debutant John Swift, and scored his first two goals for the club in a 2–2 away draw at Huddersfield Town on 27 August. He started in all 46 EFL Championship games for West Brom in his first season with the club. On 5 August 2023, prior to his second season at the club, he was named as the new captain of the team.

On 15 May 2026, the club announced he would be released at the end of the season when his contract expired.

=== Bristol City ===
On July 3rd 2026, Bristol City announced the permanent signing of Wallace on a 2-year contract following his departure from West Bromwich Albion. On signing for City, he said: “I am really proud and excited to be here. I spoke to James (Ellis) and Michael (Skubala) and I am extremely impressed."

== International career ==
On 13 March 2013, Wallace was named on the standby list for the England U19 game vs Turkey, on 21 March 2013. He was called up again on 2 May, for the 2013 UEFA U19 Championship qualification rounds, against Belgium and Scotland.

On 24 May, Wallace was an unused substitute in a match against Georgia U19s. Five days later, he made his international debut, starting in a 3–0 victory against Scotland U19s.

== Career statistics ==
As of match played 2 May 2026

Appearances and goals by club, season and competition
Club	Season	League			FA Cup		League Cup		Other		Total	
Club	Season	Division	Apps	Goals	Apps	Goals	Apps	Goals	Apps	Goals	Apps	Goals
Farnborough	2010–11	Conference South	0	0	0	0	—		1 (Note: Appearance in Hampshire Senior Cup)	0	1	0
Portsmouth	2011–12	Championship	0	0	0	0	0	0	—		0	0
Portsmouth	2012–13	League One	22	6	0	0	1	0	0	0	23	6
Portsmouth	2013–14	League Two	44	7	1	0	1	0	2 (Note: Appearances in Football League Trophy)	0	48	7
Portsmouth	2014–15	League Two	44	14	2	1	2	0	2	2	50	17
Portsmouth	Total		110	27	3	1	4	0	4	2	121	30
Farnborough (loan)	2011–12	Conference South	6	0	0	0	—		0	0	6	0
Whitehawk (loan)	2012–13	Isthmian Premier Division	11	8	0	0	—		6 (Note: Three appearances in FA Trophy, two appearances and four goals in Isthmian League Cup, one appearance in Sussex Senior Cup)	4	17	12
Wolverhampton Wanderers	2015–16	Championship	9	0	0	0	2	0	0	0	11	0
Wolverhampton Wanderers	2016–17	Championship	9	0	0	0	3	1	1 (Note: Appearance(s) in EFL Trophy)	0	13	1
Wolverhampton Wanderers	Total		18	0	0	0	5	1	1	0	24	1
Millwall (loan)	2015–16	League One	12	1	0	0	0	0	2	0	14	1
Millwall (loan)	2016–17	League One	16	3	2	0	0	0	3 (Note: Appearances in EFL League One play-offs)	0	21	3
Millwall	2017–18	Championship	43	6	3	1	1	0	0	0	47	7
Millwall	2018–19	Championship	42	5	3	0	3	0	0	0	48	5
Millwall	2019–20	Championship	43	10	1	0	0	0	0	0	44	10
Millwall	2020–21	Championship	45	11	0	0	2	0	0	0	47	11
Millwall	2021–22	Championship	38	6	0	0	1	0	0	0	39	6
Millwall	Total		239	42	9	1	7	0	5	0	260	43
West Bromwich Albion	2022–23	Championship	46	6	3	0	1	0	—		50	6
West Bromwich Albion	2023–24	Championship	42	6	1	0	0	0	2 (Note: Appearances in the Championship play-offs)	0	45	6
West Bromwich Albion	2024–25	Championship	29	1	1	0	0	0	—		30	1
West Bromwich Albion	2025–26	Championship	23	2	1	1	1	0	—		25	3
West Bromwich Albion	Total		140	15	6	1	2	0	2	0	150	16
Career total			524	92	18	3	18	1	19	6	579	102

== Honours ==
Millwall

- EFL League One play-offs: 2017

Individual

- Portsmouth Player of the Season: 2014–15
- PFA Team of the Year: 2014–15 League Two
