= Bartosz Białkowski =

Polish footballer (born 1987)

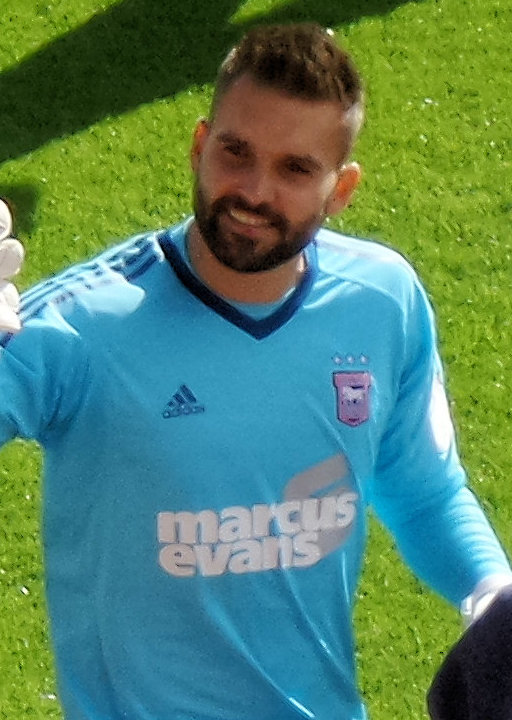
- Białkowski playing for Ipswich Town in 2017

Personal information
- Full name: Bartosz Marek Białkowski
- Date of birth: 6 July 1987 (age 39)
- Place of birth: Braniewo, Poland
- Height: 1.94 m (6 ft 4 in)
- Position: Goalkeeper

Youth career
- Polonia Elbląg

Senior career*
Years	Team	Apps	(Gls)
2002–2004	Polonia Olimpia Elbląg		
2004–2006	Górnik Zabrze	7	(0)
2006–2012	Southampton	22	(0)
2009	→ Ipswich Town (loan)	0	(0)
2009	→ Barnsley (loan)	2	(0)
2012–2014	Notts County	84	(0)
2014–2020	Ipswich Town	168	(0)
2019–2020	→ Millwall (loan)	28	(0)
2020–2024	Millwall	134	(0)
Total		445	(0)

International career
2007	Poland U20	4	(0)
2007–2008	Poland U21	5	(0)
2018	Poland	1	(0)
- * Club domestic league appearances and goals

Bartosz Marek Białkowski (Polish pronunciation: [ˈbartɔʐ bʲawˈkɔfski]; (Note: In isolation, Bartosz is pronounced [ˈbartɔʂ].) born 6 July 1987) is a Polish former professional footballer who played as a goalkeeper.

He began his career playing in his native Poland, before moving to Southampton in 2006. After six years at Southampton, he joined Notts County where he spent two seasons before joining Ipswich Town in 2014. He spent six years at Ipswich before joining Millwall on a permanent transfer in January 2020.

Białkowski has also represented his country at international level, making his senior debut for Poland in 2018.

== Club career ==
=== Górnik Zabrze ===
Born in Braniewo, Poland, Białkowski made his Ekstraklasa debut on 30 October 2004 for Górnik Zabrze in a 3–1 away defeat to Dyskobolia Grodzisk. He came off the bench to replace first-choice keeper Piotr Lech who had been sent off for a second yellow card just two minutes prior to Białkowski entering the field in the 69th minute of the game.

=== Southampton ===
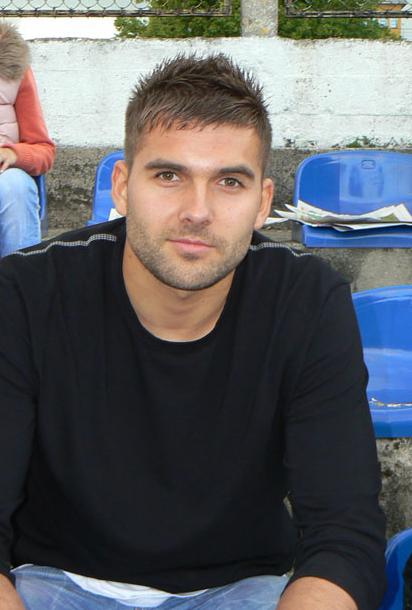
Białkowski in 2010

On 9 January 2006, Białkowski signed for Southampton. His debut game was against Crystal Palace on 25 January 2006, which resulted in a 0–0 draw. He also appeared for the first time in the FA Cup, in the 1–0 win against Leicester City on 28 January 2006.

Białkowski was injured for the end of the 2005–06 season and for the early part of the 2006–07 season, having fallen awkwardly trying to collect the ball in a 5th round FA Cup tie against Newcastle on 18 February 2006. George Burley could not substitute him as the manager had used three substitutes already. Dexter Blackstock replaced Białkowski and prevented Albert Luque from scoring his first Newcastle goal.

After waiting for his chance after returning to fitness, Białkowski returned to Southampton's starting line-up against Colchester United on 16 March 2007 as a result of a three-match suspension for Kelvin Davis. He retained his place after Davis became available again by turning in some strong performances, including saving a Michael Kightly penalty in a 6–0 win at Wolverhampton Wanderers on 31 March 2007.

Białkowski was replaced by Davis at the beginning of the 2007–08 season when Southampton lost 4–1 to Crystal Palace in the Championship and 2–1 to Peterborough United in the League Cup.

On 17 March 2009, Białkowski joined Ipswich Town on loan until the end of the season. In his first appearance for Ipswich reserves, Białkowski was red-carded for handling the ball outside the area. He did not make an appearance for the Tractor Boys and returned to Southampton at the end of the season.

On 28 September 2009, Białkowski joined Championship strugglers Barnsley on a week-long emergency loan. He played in two Championship matches, then returned to Southampton in League One. On 24 November he made his first league appearance for Southampton in over two years, replacing the injured Kelvin Davis in the 61st minute of the match against Hartlepool. He started the following six matches until Davis recovered from his injury. This run in the side coincided with Southampton's Football League Trophy Area Semi-Final tie against Norwich City. The match went to penalties and Białkowski saved the efforts of Michael Nelson, Matthew Gill and Cody McDonald to see his side through to the next round. Southampton went on to win the tournament but Białkowski was an unused substitute in the final. With Białkowski's contract set to expire in June, Southampton offered him an extension in May 2010.

In June 2010, Białkowski was reported to have signed for Portuguese side S.C. Braga but on 25 June he denied this, saying "I will be back at Southampton for the start of the season and I am hoping to stay with them." On 5 August, Białkowski signed a two-year contract extension with Southampton, with the option to extend it another two years.

Białkowski made his only league appearance of the 2011–12 season in a 2–2 draw with Blackpool. He was released at the end of the season after the club decided to release eleven players. Before his release, Białkowski was Southampton's longest serving player in the current squad.

=== Notts County ===
On 15 June 2012 Białkowski signed for Notts County on a three-year contract, where he was named as Notts County's first-choice keeper. He made his Notts County debut on 11 August 2012 in a League Cup tie at home to Bradford City. He kept his first clean sheet for the club in a 2–0 win over Hartlepool. Białkowski was praised by Notts County manager Keith Curle after he made an impressive start to the season, Curle described his performance against Sheffield United as "exceptional" and he believed Białkowski to be "one of the best goalkeepers in the division".

Białkowski kept his fifth clean sheet of the season in a 4–0 victory over Carlisle. His 10th clean sheet of the season came against Oldham, as Notts beat them 1–0. In his next game against Leyton Orient Białkowski was involved in a collision with Charlie MacDonald, he was carried off the field and taken to hospital where he was treated for concussion and a deep cut to the forehead. Białkowski made his return to action in a 1–1 draw with Walsall. Białkowski was praised by the Notts County management team in their 0–0 draw with Swindon as he made a number of vital saves. "I spoke with Pilks after the game and he said that it was the best game I’ve had for Notts County so I’m really pleased. I felt unbeatable, especially in the second half where I made a few saves and I just kept saying 'try and beat me', because I was so confident." In his first season for the club Białkowski played 40 league games and kept 14 clean sheets.

=== Ipswich Town ===
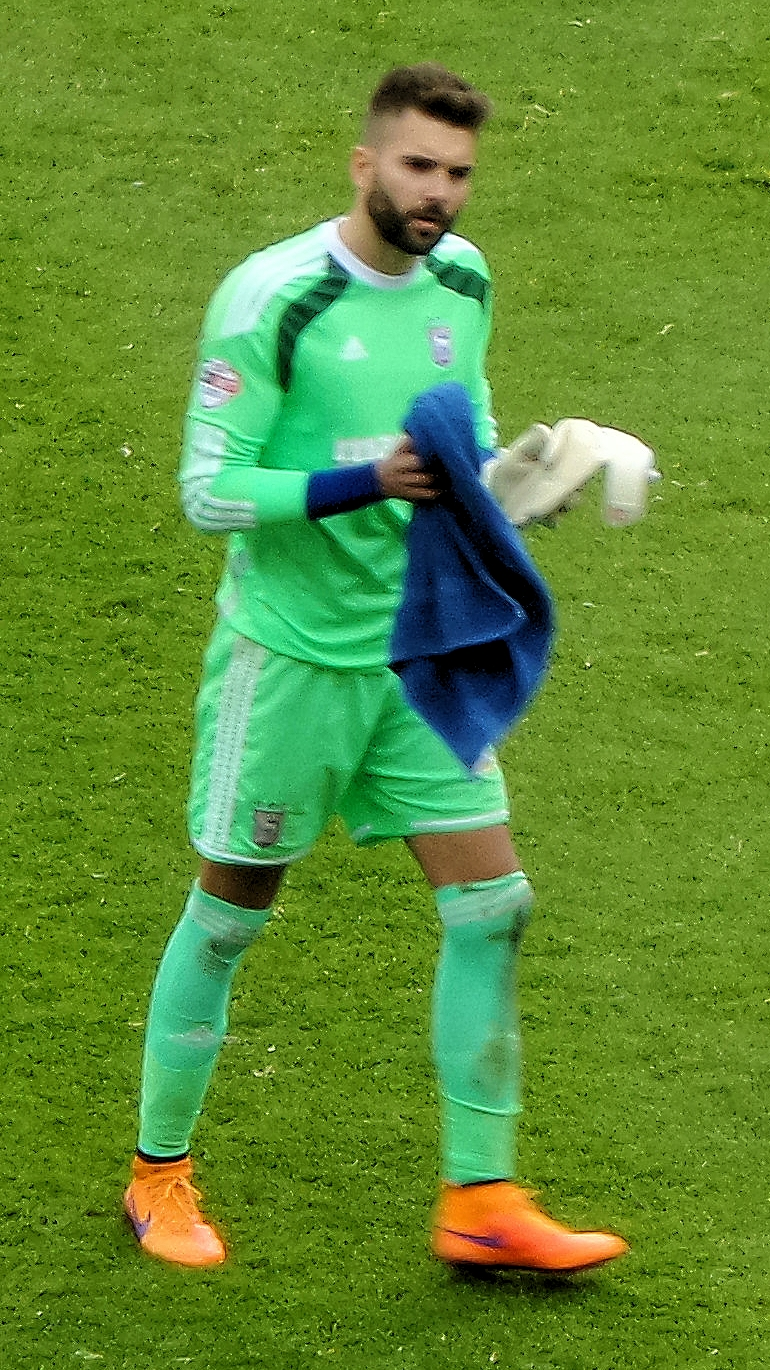
Białkowski playing for Ipswich Town in 2015

On 15 July 2014, Białkowski signed a two-year deal with Ipswich Town. He marked his Town league debut with a clean sheet in a 2–0 win at Blackpool on 1 November 2014. He kept his place for the majority of the season as Town reached the Championship play-offs, but was left out of the team for compassionate reasons following the death of his father in August 2015. He made 35 appearances during his first season at Portman Road, keeping 9 clean sheets. Fellow goalkeeper Dean Gerken's form kept him out of the team until he was injured in early 2016 and Białkowski returned with a string of impressive performances which saw him win consecutive player of the month awards and then both the Supporters' Player of the Year award and the Players' Player of the Year award for the 2015–16 season. He kept 8 clean sheets in 23 appearances over the course of the season.

Białkowski kept his place in the team for the 2016–17 season and his impressive form continued throughout the season. He made 44 appearances during the 2016–17 season, keeping 11 clean sheets. His performances over the course of the season earned him another Player of the Year award for the 2016–17 season.

He once again kept his place in the team as the first choice goalkeeper for the 2017–18 season and continued to impress with his performance levels. He made 46 appearances in all competitions during the 2017–18 season, keeping 13 clean sheets. He was again awarded the Player of the Year award for the third consecutive season, as well as the Players' Player of the Year award for a second time.

On 16 July 2018, Białkowski signed a new three-year contract with Ipswich, with the option of a further 12 months. He was first choice keeper for most of the 2018–19 season, making 30 appearances in all competitions. However, it was generally considered that he had had a disappointing season, with a number of mistakes leading him to be dropped by both Paul Hurst and Paul Lambert during the season. Bialkowski would later state his discontent with former manager Hurst over him being dropped without explanation in an interview, branding his actions to be "disrespectful".

=== Millwall ===
On 30 July 2019, Białkowski joined Championship side Millwall on loan for the 2019–20 season. He had previously been linked with a permanent move to the club back in June, but the deal ultimately fell through due to a complication with his medical.

He made his Millwall debut on 3 August 2019, replacing the injured Frank Fielding in the 43rd minute of Millwall's 1–0 opening day victory against Preston North End. After making 28 appearances and impressing for the Lions, Bialkowski's loan was made permanent on 27 January 2020 for an undisclosed fee. He played every league game for Millwall during his first season at the club, winning the Championship Golden Glove for keeping a league high sixteen clean sheets. His performances for Millwall have earned him the Player of the Year award twice, for the 2019–20 and 2020–21 seasons.

In April 2024, Białkowski announced that he would leave Millwall when his contract expired at the end of the season. On 29 August 2024, Bialkowski announced his retirement from football.

== International career ==
Białkowski's first experience of international football came in 2007, when he was called up to the Poland U20 squad to compete in the FIFA U-20 World Cup in Canada.

Białkowski made his senior international debut for Poland on 23 March 2018 in a 1–0 friendly defeat by Nigeria, coming on as a half-time substitute for Łukasz Fabiański.

In May 2018, he was named in Poland's final 23-man squad for the 2018 FIFA World Cup in Russia. He featured on the bench in each of Poland's three Group H matches, but did not make an appearance as Poland exited the World Cup at the group stage.

== Career statistics ==
=== Club ===
Appearances and goals by club, season and competition
Club	Season	League			National cup (Note: Includes Polish Cup, FA Cup)		League cup (Note: Includes EFL Cup)		Other		Total	
Club	Season	Division	Apps	Goals	Apps	Goals	Apps	Goals	Apps	Goals	Apps	Goals
Polonia Olimpia Elbląg	2003–04	III liga, group I			1	0	—		—		1	0
Górnik Zabrze	2003–04	Ekstraklasa	0	0	—		—		—		0	0
Górnik Zabrze	2004–05	Ekstraklasa	7	0	5	0	—		—		12	0
Górnik Zabrze	2005–06	Ekstraklasa	0	0	0	0	—		—		0	0
Górnik Zabrze	Total		7	0	5	0	0	0	0	0	12	0
Southampton	2005–06	Championship	5	0	2	0	0	0	—		7	0
Southampton	2006–07	Championship	8	0	0	0	0	0	1 (Note: Appearance(s) in Championship play-offs)	0	9	0
Southampton	2007–08	Championship	1	0	0	0	1	0	—		2	0
Southampton	2008–09	Championship	0	0	0	0	3	0	—		3	0
Southampton	2009–10	League One	7	0	1	0	0	0	2 (Note: Appearance(s) in Football League Trophy)	0	10	0
Southampton	2010–11	League One	0	0	3	0	0	0	0	0	3	0
Southampton	2011–12	Championship	1	0	3	0	4	0	—		8	0
Southampton	Total		22	0	9	0	8	0	3	0	42	0
Ipswich Town (loan)	2008–09	Championship	0	0	0	0	0	0	—		0	0
Barnsley (loan)	2009–10	Championship	2	0	0	0	0	0	—		2	0
Notts County	2012–13	League One	40	0	2	0	1	0	2	0	45	0
Notts County	2013–14	League One	44	0	1	0	2	0	1	0	48	0
Notts County	Total		84	0	3	0	3	0	3	0	93	0
Ipswich Town	2014–15	Championship	31	0	1	0	1	0	2	0	35	0
Ipswich Town	2015–16	Championship	20	0	2	0	1	0	—		23	0
Ipswich Town	2016–17	Championship	44	0	0	0	0	0	—		44	0
Ipswich Town	2017–18	Championship	45	0	1	0	0	0	—		46	0
Ipswich Town	2018–19	Championship	28	0	1	0	1	0	—		30	0
Ipswich Town	Total		168	0	5	0	3	0	2	0	178	0
Millwall (loan)	2019–20	Championship	28	0	2	0	0	0	—		30	0
Millwall	2019–20	Championship	18	0	0	0	0	0	—		18	0
Millwall	2020–21	Championship	46	0	0	0	3	0	—		49	0
Millwall	2021–22	Championship	46	0	0	0	0	0	—		46	0
Millwall	2022–23	Championship	10	0	1	0	0	0	—		11	0
Millwall	2023–24	Championship	14	0	1	0	0	0	—		15	0
Millwall	Total		162	0	4	0	3	0	0	0	169	0
Career total			445	0	27	0	17	0	8	0	497	0

=== International ===
Appearances and goals by national team and year
National team	Year	Apps	Goals
Poland	2018	1	0
Total		1	0

== Honours ==
Southampton

- Football League Trophy: 2009–10
- Football League One runner-up: 2010–11
- Football League Championship runner-up: 2011–12

Individual

- Ipswich Town Player of the Year: 2015–16, 2016–17, 2017–18
- Ipswich Town Players' Player of the Year: 2015–16, 2017–18
- EFL Championship Golden Glove: 2019–20
- Millwall Player of the Year: 2019–20, 2020–21
