= Tyler Burey =

English footballer (born 2001)

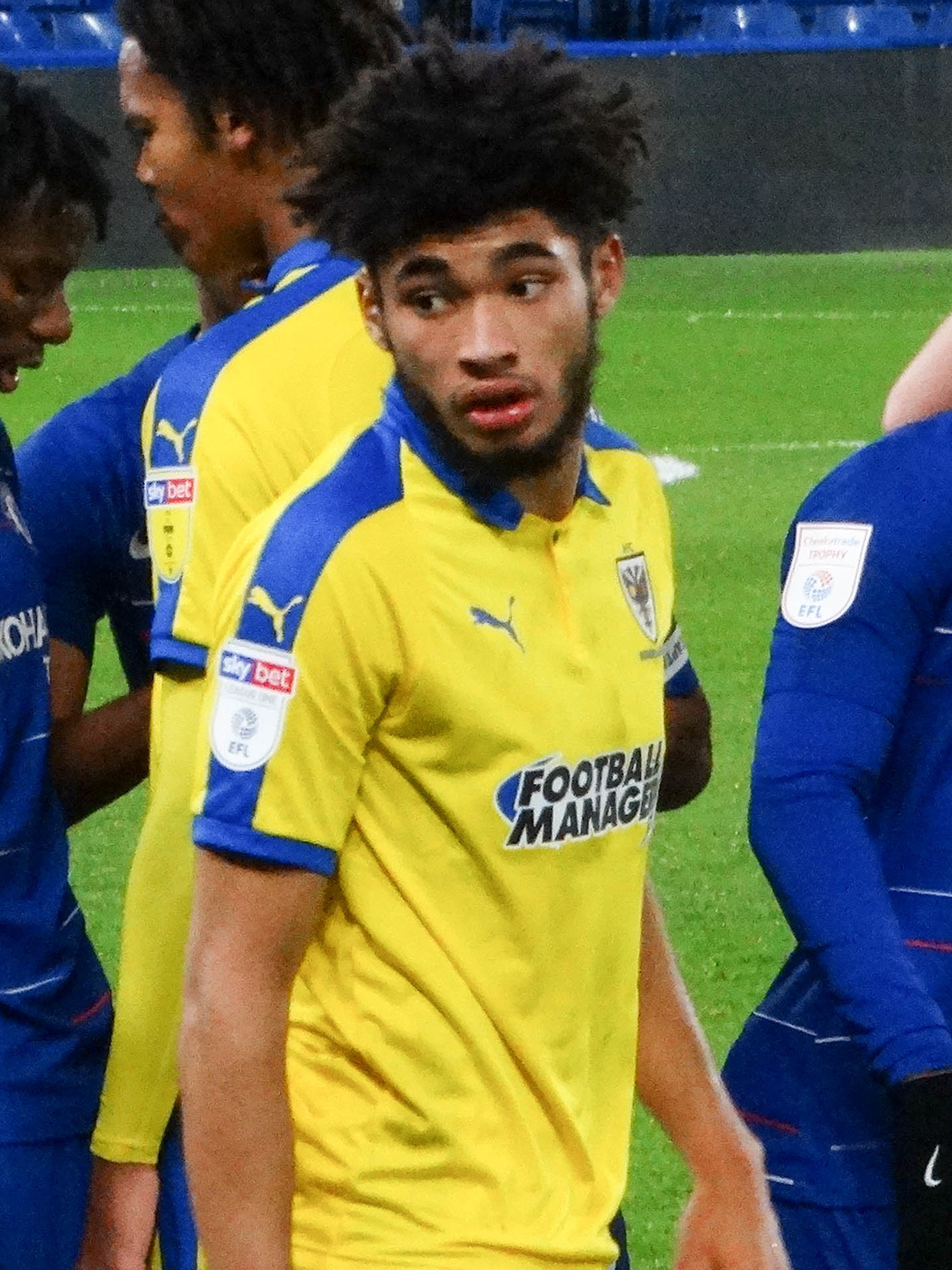
- Burey with AFC Wimbledon in December 2018

Personal information
- Full name: Tyler David Sylvester Burey
- Date of birth: 18 June 2001 (age 25)
- Place of birth: Hillingdon, England
- Position: Winger

Youth career
- –2018: AFC Wimbledon

Senior career*
Years	Team	Apps	(Gls)
2018–2019	AFC Wimbledon	3	(0)
2019–2023	Millwall	53	(3)
2021–2022	→ Hartlepool United (loan)	7	(3)
2023–2024	OB	6	(0)
2024	→ Oxford United (loan)	5	(0)
2024–2025	Carlisle United	10	(0)
2025	Igman Konjic	13	(1)
2025–2026	Zrinjski Mostar	5	(0)
- * Club domestic league appearances and goals as of 16:04, 18 March 2026 (UTC)

Tyler David Sylvester Burey (born 18 June 2001) is an English professional footballer who plays as a winger. He is currently a free agent.

== Career ==
On 6 November 2018, Burey made his AFC Wimbledon debut in the EFL Trophy as the Dons beat Stevenage 4–0. He then made his Wimbledon league debut in a 2–0 away defeat to Charlton Athletic. On 28 June 2019, Burey signed for Millwall after turning down a contract offer from AFC Wimbledon, with the two clubs agreeing a compensation fee. Burey made his Millwall debut as a late substitute in a 4–1 win against Huddersfield Town.

On 5 August 2021, it was announced that Burey had joined EFL League Two club Hartlepool United on loan until January 2022. He made his Hartlepool debut as a late substitute in a 1–0 victory against Crawley Town and assisted the winner for Gavan Holohan. On 14 August 2021, Burey scored his first professional goal in a 3–2 defeat to Barrow. A week later, Burey added his second goal for the club against Walsall - beating his man and driving into the box, before curling an effort high into the far corner. On 28 August 2021, Burey netted his third senior goal in a 2–1 win over rivals Carlisle United, receiving the ball from Will Goodwin on the edge of the box and curling an unstoppable effort into the top corner. This was Burey's third goal for the club in four games.

He was named as Millwall's Young Player of the Season for 2021–22.

In August 2023, he joined Danish Superliga side OB on a three-year deal. On 10 January 2024, Burey joined League One club Oxford United on loan for the remainder of the season. On 29 August 2024, after his loan spell in Oxford, OB confirmed that they had terminated Burey's contract by mutual agreement, despite him originally having a deal until June 2026.

On 19 October 2024 Burey signed for Carlisle United on a deal until January 2025. On 8 January, it was confirmed that Burey would leave the club at the end of January.

On 6 February 2025, Burey joined Bosnian Premier League club Igman Konjic.

On 16 June 2025, Burey signed for Bosnian champions Zrinjski Mostar on a two-year deal. In the summer of 2025, he made his European cup debut in the Champions League qualifiers, starting with a match against San Marinese team AC Virtus. On 3 February 2026, Burey left the club by mutual termination.

== Personal life ==
Born in Hillingdon, Burey is of Jamaican descent.

== Career statistics ==
As of 1 January 2025

Appearances and goals by club, season and competition
Club	Season	League			FA Cup		EFL Cup		Other		Total	
Club	Season	Division	Apps	Goals	Apps	Goals	Apps	Goals	Apps	Goals	Apps	Goals
AFC Wimbledon	2018–19	League One	3	0	0	0	0	0	2 (Note: Appearance(s) in EFL Trophy)	0	5	0
Millwall	2019–20	Championship	1	0	0	0	0	0	—		1	0
Millwall	2020–21	Championship	13	0	2	0	0	0	—		15	0
Millwall	2021–22	Championship	15	2	1	0	0	0	—		16	2
Millwall	2022–23	Championship	24	1	1	0	1	0	—		26	1
Millwall	Total		53	3	4	0	1	0	0	0	58	3
Hartlepool United (loan)	2021–22	League Two	7	3	0	0	1	0	1	0	9	3
OB	2023–24	Superliga	6	0	2	0	—		—		8	0
Oxford United (loan)	2023–24	League One	5	0	0	0	0	0	0	0	5	0
Carlisle United	2024–25	League Two	10	0	0	0	0	0	0	0	10	0
Career total			84	6	6	0	2	0	3	0	95	6

== Honours ==
Individual

- Millwall Young Player of the Season: 2021–22
