= Murray Wallace (footballer) =

Scottish footballer (born 1993)

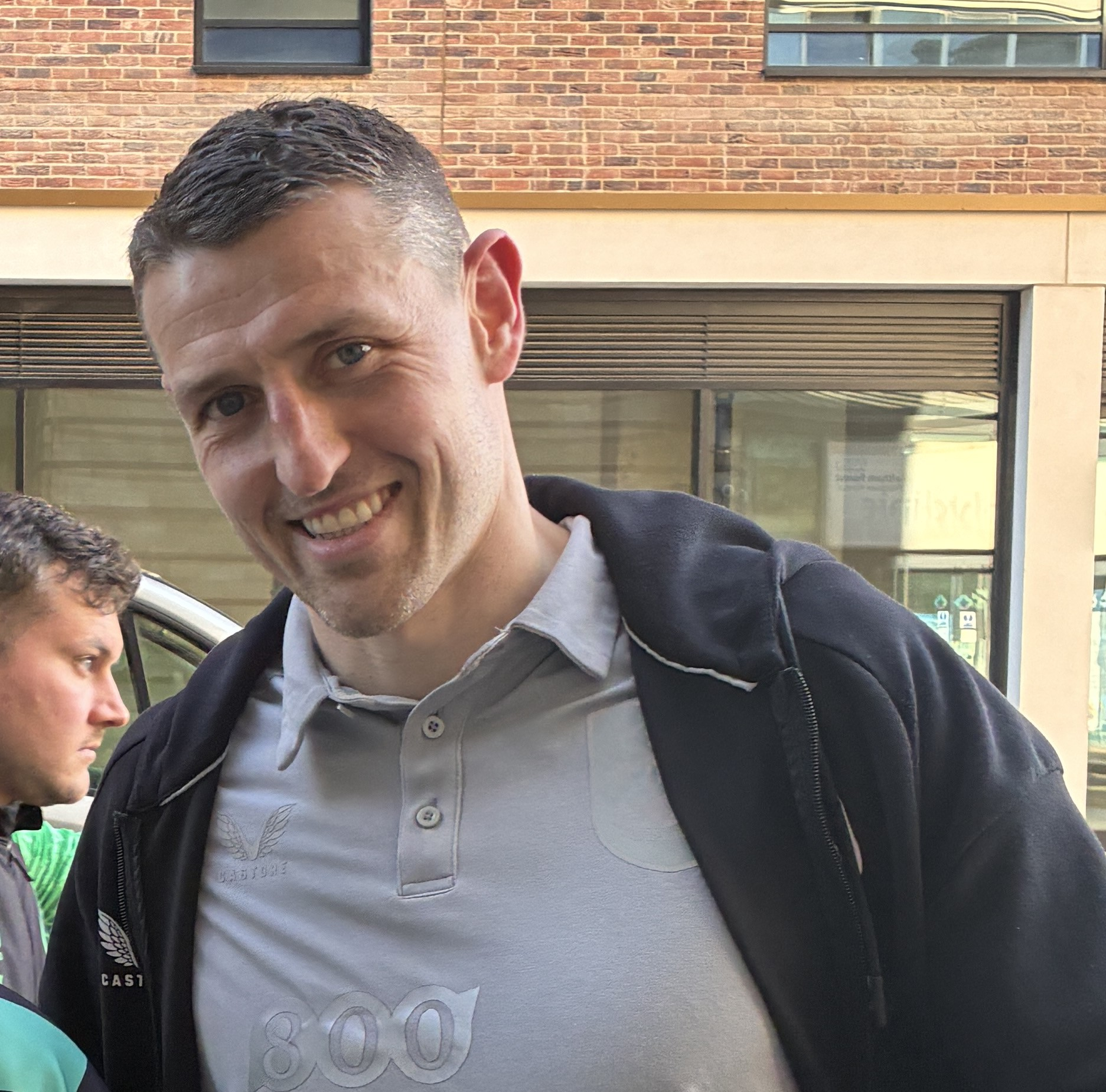

Personal information
- Full name: Murray Wallace
- Date of birth: 10 January 1993 (age 33)
- Place of birth: Glasgow, Scotland
- Height: 1.88 m (6 ft 2 in)
- Position: Centre-back

Team information
- Current team: Huddersfield Town
- Number: 3

Youth career
- Rangers
- 2009–2011: Falkirk

Senior career*
| Years | Team | Apps | (Gls) |
| 2011–2012 | Falkirk | 19 | (2) |
| 2012–2016 | Huddersfield Town | 51 | (3) |
| 2012 | → Falkirk (loan) | 15 | (0) |
| 2015 | → Scunthorpe United (loan) | 12 | (1) |
| 2016–2018 | Scunthorpe United | 112 | (3) |
| 2018–2025 | Millwall | 207 | (9) |
| 2025– | Huddersfield Town | 32 | (1) |

International career^{‡}
| 2012 | Scotland U20 | 1 | (0) |
| 2012–2013 | Scotland U21 | 4 | (0) |
- * Club domestic league appearances and goals as of 1 May 2026 (UTC) ‡ National team caps and goals as of 13:10, 4 May 2014 (UTC)

Murray Wallace (born 10 January 1993) is a Scottish professional footballer who plays as a centre-back for EFL League One club Huddersfield Town.

After beginning his career in his native Scotland playing for Falkirk, Wallace joined Huddersfield Town in 2012. He spent three years with Football League One side Scunthorpe United, transferring to Millwall for a £500,000 fee on 20 June 2018. He also played for the Scotland under-20 and under-21 football teams.

== Club career ==
=== Falkirk ===
Born in Glasgow and raised in Eaglesham in East Renfrewshire, Wallace began his career as a trainee with Rangers before joining the academy at Falkirk aged 16. He made his first team debut on 6 August 2011 as a substitute in Falkirk's 1–0 defeat to Raith Rovers in the Scottish First Division. He went on to make his first league start on 13 August 2011 against Partick Thistle at the Falkirk Stadium. He scored his first goal for the club on 5 November 2011 in a 4–3 win over Livingston.

On 31 January, the last day of the January 2012 transfer window, Wallace signed for Huddersfield Town on a two-year deal, after rejecting moves to Brighton & Hove Albion and Ipswich Town. As part of the deal he was immediately loaned back to Falkirk for the remainder of the season, beginning with a start in the goalless 0–0 draw away at Greenock Morton on 11 February 2012. He went on to make 15 more appearances for Falkirk during the loan spell, making it a total 34 appearances for the club (two goals) before returning to parent club Huddersfield, with his final appearance coming in a 3–2 win over Ayr as the Bairns finished the season in third position. He was also in the side as they won the 2011–12 Scottish Challenge Cup in April 2012, beating Hamilton Academical 1–0 in the final at Almondvale Stadium on 1 April 2012.

=== Huddersfield Town ===
Wallace returned to Huddersfield in May 2012 at the end of his loan at former club Falkirk. He was set to train with Simon Grayson's squad throughout the play-off campaign until he joined up with the Scotland Under-20 side ahead of a tournament being held in the Netherlands, as Huddersfield went on to win the play-off final beating Sheffield United on penalties to win promotion to the Championship.

Wallace was given the number 15 shirt on 12 July 2012 when the squad returned to training for the 2012–13 season. He featured regularly for Huddersfield during pre-season receiving his first call up to the Scotland U21s in August 2012. After patiently waiting for his chance, Wallace made his Terriers debut as a substitute in the 1–1 draw against Blackpool at the John Smith's Stadium on 26 December 2012, and made his full debut three days later in their 0–0 draw with Sheffield Wednesday. His first goal for the club came in a 2–2 draw against Peterborough United on 6 April 2013. Wallace capped the season off by winning Young Player of the Year.

In the following two seasons, he would make sporadic appearances for the Terriers, mainly due to only being selected when other centre-backs were injured or suspended.

==== Scunthorpe loan ====
On 25 August 2015, with appearances still being limited, Wallace joined Scunthorpe United on loan for a month in an emergency loan deal. After making 12 league appearances, he was recalled by Huddersfield on 1 November, along with team-mate Joe Lolley.

=== Scunthorpe United ===
Wallace signed a three-and-a-half-year deal with Scunthorpe on 2 January 2016. Upon signing for the Iron, he featured in every minute of every competitive fixture until 29 August 2017, when his run of 7,560 consecutive playing minutes was broken as he didn't feature in Scunthorpe's EFL Trophy game against Sunderland U21s. He was named as the side's Player of the Season for 2016–17.

=== Millwall ===
In June 2018, Wallace signed a "long-term" deal at Championship side Millwall for a £500,000 fee. He scored the winning goal in two consecutive rounds of the 2018–19 FA Cup as the Lions defeated Everton and AFC Wimbledon to reach the quarter-finals, but also collected two yellow cards and was suspended for the resulting match against Brighton which ended in defeat for Millwall on penalties.

Wallace was named as the London side's Player of the Season for 2021–22 season. In July 2022, Wallace signed a new long-term contract.

On 19 May 2025, the club announced he would be leaving in June when his contract expired.

=== Return to Huddersfield Town ===
On 18 June 2025, Wallace agreed to return to League One side Huddersfield Town on a two-year deal from 1 July.

== International career ==
Wallace gained his first international call-up for the Scotland U20 side in May 2012 when he was named by head coach Ricky Sbragia in the squad to compete in the 59th ADO Den Haag tournament. He made his debut in a 0–0 draw with Manchester City on 25 May 2012 (the same weekend his club side Huddersfield Town secured promotion to the Championship via the League One play-offs). and went on to feature in all five of Scotland's matches, playing the full 90 minutes in each, including the 1–0 victory over the hosts ADO Den Haag on 26 May, sending them through to the semi-final where the Scots lost 2–1 to Mexico, and then 1–0 to Cruzeiro in the third place play-off match (both played on 27 May).

On 1 August 2012, Wallace received his first call-up to the Scotland under-21 team, after being named in the squad for their friendly match against Belgium on 14 August at East End Park, Dunfermline. He made his debut in the match on 14 August, playing the full 90 minutes in a 1–0 defeat.

== Career statistics ==
As of match played 30 September 2025

Appearances and goals by club, season and competition
| Club | Season | League | | | National cup (Note: Includes Scottish Cup, FA Cup) | | League cup (Note: Includes Scottish League Cup, EFL Cup) | | Other | | Total | |
| Club | Season | Division | Apps | Goals | Apps | Goals | Apps | Goals | Apps | Goals | Apps | Goals |
|---|---|---|---|---|---|---|---|---|---|---|---|---|
| Falkirk | 2010–11 | Scottish Championship | 0 | 0 | 0 | 0 | 0 | 0 | 0 | 0 | 0 | 0 |
| Falkirk | 2011–12 | Scottish Championship | 19 | 2 | 1 | 0 | 3 | 0 | 2 (Note: Appearances in the Scottish Challenge Cup) | 0 | 25 | 2 |
| Falkirk | Total | | 19 | 2 | 1 | 0 | 3 | 0 | 2 | 0 | 25 | 2 |
| Huddersfield Town | 2012–13 | Championship | 6 | 1 | 1 | 0 | 0 | 0 | 0 | 0 | 7 | 1 |
| Huddersfield Town | 2013–14 | Championship | 17 | 0 | 2 | 0 | 2 | 0 | 0 | 0 | 21 | 0 |
| Huddersfield Town | 2014–15 | Championship | 26 | 2 | 1 | 0 | 2 | 0 | 0 | 0 | 29 | 2 |
| Huddersfield Town | 2015–16 | Championship | 2 | 0 | 0 | 0 | 1 | 1 | 0 | 0 | 3 | 1 |
| Huddersfield Town | Total | | 51 | 3 | 4 | 0 | 5 | 1 | 0 | 0 | 60 | 4 |
| Falkirk (loan) | 2011–12 | Scottish Championship | 15 | 0 | 1 | 0 | 0 | 0 | 1 | 0 | 17 | 0 |
| Scunthorpe United (loan) | 2015–16 | League One | 12 | 1 | 0 | 0 | 0 | 0 | 1 (Note: Appearance in the Football League Trophy) | 0 | 13 | 1 |
| Scunthorpe United | 2015–16 | League One | 21 | 1 | 1 | 0 | 0 | 0 | 0 | 0 | 22 | 1 |
| Scunthorpe United | 2016–17 | League One | 46 | 2 | 1 | 0 | 2 | 0 | 7 (Note: Five appearances in the EFL Trophy and two in the League One play-offs) | 1 | 56 | 3 |
| Scunthorpe United | 2017–18 | League One | 45 | 0 | 3 | 0 | 2 | 0 | 2 (Note: Two appearances in the League One play-offs) | 0 | 52 | 0 |
| Scunthorpe United | Total | | 112 | 3 | 5 | 0 | 4 | 0 | 9 | 1 | 130 | 4 |
| Millwall | 2018–19 | Championship | 21 | 2 | 3 | 2 | 3 | 0 | 0 | 0 | 27 | 4 |
| Millwall | 2019–20 | Championship | 43 | 0 | 2 | 0 | 2 | 0 | 0 | 0 | 47 | 0 |
| Millwall | 2020–21 | Championship | 23 | 1 | 0 | 0 | 3 | 0 | 0 | 0 | 26 | 1 |
| Millwall | 2021–22 | Championship | 42 | 4 | 0 | 0 | 2 | 2 | 0 | 0 | 44 | 6 |
| Millwall | 2022–23 | Championship | 37 | 0 | 1 | 0 | 1 | 0 | 0 | 0 | 39 | 0 |
| Millwall | 2023–24 | Championship | 30 | 2 | 0 | 0 | 1 | 0 | 0 | 0 | 31 | 2 |
| Millwall | 2024–25 | Championship | 11 | 0 | 0 | 0 | 1 | 0 | 0 | 0 | 12 | 0 |
| Millwall | Total | | 207 | 9 | 6 | 2 | 13 | 2 | 0 | 0 | 226 | 13 |
| Huddersfield Town | 2025–26 | League One | 4 | 0 | 0 | 0 | 3 | 0 | 2 | 0 | 9 | 0 |
| Career total | | | 420 | 18 | 17 | 2 | 28 | 3 | 15 | 1 | 480 | 24 |

== Honours ==
Falkirk

- Scottish Challenge Cup: 2011–12

Individual

- Millwall Player of the Season: 2021–22
- Scunthorpe Player of the Season: 2016–17
