= 2015–16 Millwall F.C. season =

Millwall
2015–16 season
- Chairman: John Berylson
- Manager: Neil Harris
- Stadium: The Den
- League One: 4th (lost in play-off final)
- FA Cup: Second round (eliminated by Wycombe Wanderers)
- League Cup: First round (eliminated by Barnet)
- FL Trophy: Southern area final (eliminated by Oxford United)
- Top goalscorer: League: Lee Gregory (18); All: Lee Gregory (25)
- Highest home attendance: 16,301 vs. Bradford City, 20 May 2016
- Lowest home attendance: 2,050 vs. Peterborough United, 1 September 2015
Home colours	Away colours	Third colours

The 2015–16 season was Millwall's 131st year in existence and their first back in League One since the 2009–10 season, after being relegated from The Championship the previous season. It was Millwall's 90th consecutive season in The Football League and 42nd in the third tier. Along with competing in League One, the club participated in the FA Cup, League Cup and Football League Trophy. The season marked the first full season in charge for club record goalscorer Neil Harris, who became manager in April. He led the club to fourth place, finishing with 81 points and a play-off place. This season covers the period from 1 July 2015 to 30 June 2016.

== Squad ==
No.	Name	Pos.	Nat.	Place of Birth	Age	Apps	Goals	Signed from	Date signed	Fee	Ends
Goalkeepers
1	David Forde	GK	(Republic of Ireland)	Galway	46	339	0	Cardiff City	5 June 2008	Free	2017
13	Jordan Archer	GK	(Scotland) (England)	Walthamstow	33	46	0	Tottenham Hotspur	22 June 2015	Free	2017
41	Tom King	GK	(England)	Croydon	31	0	0	Crystal Palace	31 August 2014	Free	Undisclosed
Defenders
2	Shaun Cummings	RB	(Jamaica) (England)	Hammersmith	37	32	1	Reading	12 January 2015	Undisclosed	2017
3	Joe Martin	LB	(England)	Dagenham	37	40	3	Gillingham	22 June 2015	Free	2017
5	Tony Craig	CB	(England)	Greenwich	41	170	6	Brentford	4 July 2015	Free	2017
15	Sid Nelson	CB	(England)	Lewisham	30	29	0	Academy	1 July 2013	Trainee	2018
16	Mark Beevers	CB	(England)	Barnsley	26	151	8	Sheffield Wednesday	5 October 2012	Free	2016
17	Byron Webster	CB	(England)	Sherburn-in-Elmet	39	65	6	Yeovil Town	1 July 2014	Free	2017
25	Christian Mbulu	CB	(England)		29	0	0	Brentwood Town	6 August 2015	Free	Undisclosed
27	Mahlon Romeo	RB	(Antigua and Barbuda) (England)	Westminster	30	18	1	Gillingham	5 May 2015	Free	2019
33	Noah Chesmain	LB	(England)		28	1	0	Academy	1 July 2015	Trainee	Undisclosed
midfielders
4	Carlos Edwards	RW	(Trinidad and Tobago)	Diego Martin	37	39	1	Free agent	24 August 2015	Free	2016
6	Shaun Williams	DM	(Republic of Ireland)	Dublin	39	99	7	Milton Keynes Dons	27 January 2014	Undisclosed	Undisclosed
7	Paris Cowan-Hall	RW	(England)	Hillingdon	25	11	0	Wycombe Wanderers	1 January 2015	Undisclosed	2017
8	Ed Upson	CM	(England)	Bury St Edmunds	26	77	2	Yeovil Town	31 January 2014	Undisclosed	2016
10	Fred Onyedinma	AM	(Nigeria) (England)	Plumstead	29	52	4	Academy	1 July 2013	Trainee	2017
11	Lee Martin	LM	(England)	Taunton	29	69	2	Ipswich Town	4 July 2013	Free	2016
18	Shane Ferguson	LM	(Northern Ireland)	Derry	34	47	3	Newcastle United	26 January 2016	Undisclosed	2017
19	Chris Taylor	LM	(England)	Oldham	29	13	3	Blackburn Rovers	17 March 2016	Loan	2016
23	Jack Powell	CM	(England)	Canning Town	22	9	0	West Ham United	1 July 2013	Free	2016
24	Ben Thompson	CM	(England)	Sidcup	30	38	2	Academy	1 July 2014	Trainee	Undisclosed
26	Jimmy Abdou	CM	(Comoros) (France)	Martigues	41	321	8	Plymouth Argyle	3 July 2008	Free	Undisclsoed
Forwards
9	Lee Gregory	CF	(England)	Sheffield	37	95	36	Halifax Town	17 June 2014	£250,000	2017
20	Steve Morison	CF	(Wales) (England)	Enfield	42	195	66	Leeds United	4 August 2015	Free	2017
22	Aiden O'Brien	CF	(Republic of Ireland) (England)	Islington	32	92	15	Academy	1 August 2011	Trainee	2019
28	Jamie Philpot	CF	(England)	Pembury	29	8	1	Academy	1 July 2014	Trainee	Undisclosed
29	Alfie Pavey	CF	(England)		30	7	0	Academy	1 January 2014	Trainee	Undisclosed

=== Statistics ===
As of 19 July 2016

No.	Pos	Nat	Player	Total		League		FA Cup		League Cup		League Trophy	
No.	Pos	Nat	Player	Apps	Goals	Apps	Goals	Apps	Goals	Apps	Goals	Apps	Goals
1	GK	(Republic of Ireland) IRL	David Forde	10	0	7+1	0	1+0	0	0+0	0	1+0	0
2	DF	(Jamaica) JAM	Shaun Cummings	20	1	15+1	1	1+0	0	0+0	0	3+0	0
3	DF	(England) ENG	Joe Martin	36	2	27+2	2	2+0	0	0+0	0	4+1	0
4	MF	(Trinidad and Tobago) TRI	Carlos Edwards	19	0	15+0	0	1+0	0	0+0	0	3+0	0
5	DF	(England) ENG	Tony Craig	21	1	16+2	1	0+0	0	1+0	0	2+0	0
6	MF	(Republic of Ireland) IRL	Shaun Williams	39	4	31+1	2	2+0	0	1+0	0	4+0	2
8	MF	(England) ENG	Ed Upson	39	0	16+16	0	1+0	0	1+0	0	3+2	0
9	FW	(England) ENG	Lee Gregory	50	25	32+9	18	2+0	1	0+1	0	5+1	6
10	MF	(Nigeria) NGA	Fred Onyedinma	41	4	17+16	4	2+0	0	1+0	0	2+3	0
11	MF	(England) ENG	Lee Martin	11	0	2+6	0	0+1	0	1+0	0	1+0	0
13	GK	(Scotland) SCO	Jordan Archer	46	0	39+0	0	1+0	0	1+0	0	5+0	0
14	FW	(Northern Ireland) NIR	John Marquis	12	0	0+10	0	0+0	0	1+0	0	1+0	0
15	DF	(England) ENG	Sid Nelson	14	0	9+0	0	1+0	0	1+0	0	1+2	0
16	DF	(England) ENG	Mark Beevers	50	4	42+0	4	1+0	0	0+1	0	6+0	0
17	DF	(England) ENG	Byron Webster	48	6	35+5	6	2+0	0	1+0	0	4+1	0
18	MF	(Northern Ireland) NIR	Shane Ferguson	42	3	28+10	3	0+0	0	1+0	0	2+1	0
19	MF	(England) ENG	Chris Taylor (on loan from Blackburn Rovers)	10	3	9+1	3	0+0	0	0+0	0	0+0	0
20	FW	(Wales) WAL	Steve Morison	54	18	44+2	15	2+0	1	1+0	1	5+0	1
22	FW	(Republic of Ireland) IRL	Aiden O'Brien	51	13	31+12	10	1+1	1	0+0	0	5+1	2
23	MF	(England) ENG	Jack Powell	3	0	1+0	0	0+1	0	0+0	0	1+0	0
24	MF	(England) ENG	Ben Thompson	33	2	19+9	1	2+0	1	0+0	0	1+2	0
26	MF	(Comoros) COM	Jimmy Abdou	31	1	27+2	1	0+0	0	0+0	0	2+0	0
27	DF	(Antigua and Barbuda) ATG	Mahlon Romeo	18	1	18+0	1	0+0	0	0+0	0	0+0	0
28	FW	(England) ENG	Jamie Philpot	6	0	0+6	0	0+0	0	0+0	0	0+0	0
33	DF	(England) ENG	Noah Chesmain	1	0	0+1	0	0+0	0	0+0	0	0+0	0
Players out on loan:
7	FW	(England) ENG	Paris Cowan-Hall (at Wycombe Wanderers)	6	0	0+3	0	1+0	0	0+1	0	0+1	0
29	FW	(England) ENG	Alfie Pavey (at Aldershot Town)	6	0	0+4	0	0+2	0	0+0	0	0+0	0
Players who left the club during the season:
21	MF	(England) ENG	George Saville (on loan from Wolverhampton Wanderers)	15	0	12+0	0	0+0	0	0+0	0	3+0	0
25	MF	(England) ENG	Jed Wallace (on loan from Wolverhampton Wanderers)	14	1	12+0	1	0+0	0	0+0	0	2+0	0

==== Play-off statistics ====
As of 19 July 2016

No.	Pos	Nat	Player	Total		League One Play-offs	
No.	Pos	Nat	Player	Apps	Goals	Apps	Goals
3	DF	(England) ENG	Joe Martin	3	1	3+0	1
4	MF	(Trinidad and Tobago) TRI	Carlos Edwards	3	0	3+0	0
5	DF	(England) ENG	Tony Craig	3	0	1+2	0
6	MF	(Republic of Ireland) IRL	Shaun Williams	3	0	0+3	0
9	FW	(England) ENG	Lee Gregory	3	2	3+0	2
10	MF	(Nigeria) NGA	Fred Onyedinma	1	0	0+1	0
13	GK	(Scotland) SCO	Jordan Archer	3	0	3+0	0
16	DF	(England) ENG	Mark Beevers	3	1	3+0	1
17	DF	(England) ENG	Byron Webster	2	0	2+0	0
18	MF	(Northern Ireland) NIR	Shane Ferguson	3	0	3+0	0
19	MF	(England) ENG	Chris Taylor	3	0	3+0	0
20	FW	(Wales) WAL	Steve Morison	3	1	3+0	1
22	FW	(Republic of Ireland) IRL	Aiden O'Brien	2	0	0+2	0
24	MF	(England) ENG	Ben Thompson	3	0	3+0	0
26	MF	(Comoros) COM	Jimmy Abdou	3	0	3+0	0

==== Goals record ====
As of 19 July 2016

Rank	No.	Po.	Name	League One	FA Cup	League Cup	League Trophy	Play-offs	Total
1	9	FW	(England) Lee Gregory	18	1	0	6	2	27
2	20	FW	(England) Steve Morison	15	1	1	1	1	19
3	22	FW	(Republic of Ireland) Aiden O'Brien	10	1	0	2	0	13
4	17	DF	(England) Byron Webster	6	0	0	0	0	6
4	16	DF	(England) Mark Beevers	4	0	0	0	1	5
6	6	MF	(Republic of Ireland) Shaun Williams	2	0	0	2	0	4
6	10	MF	(Nigeria) Fred Onyedinma	4	0	0	0	0	4
8	3	DF	(England) Joe Martin	2	0	0	0	1	3
8	18	MF	(Northern Ireland) Shane Ferguson	3	0	0	0	0	3
8	19	MF	(England) Chris Taylor	3	0	0	0	0	3
11	24	MF	(England) Ben Thompson	1	1	0	0	0	2
12	2	DF	(Jamaica) Shaun Cummings	1	0	0	0	0	1
12	5	DF	(England) Tony Craig	1	0	0	0	0	1
12	~~25~~	MF	(England) Jed Wallace	1	0	0	0	0	1
12	26	MF	(Comoros) Jimmy Abdou	1	0	0	0	0	1
12	27	DF	(Antigua and Barbuda) Mahlon Romeo	1	0	0	0	0	1
Total				78	4	1	6	4	93

==== Disciplinary record ====
As of 19 July 2016

Rank	No.	Po.	Name	League One		FA Cup		League Cup		League Trophy		Play-offs		Total	
Rank	No.	Po.	Name	Booked	Sent off (straight red)	Booked	Sent off (straight red)	Booked	Sent off (straight red)	Booked	Sent off (straight red)	Booked	Sent off (straight red)	Booked	Sent off (straight red)
1	3	DF	(England) Joe Martin	10	0	1	0	0	0	2	0	0	0	13	0
2	6	MF	(Republic of Ireland) Shaun Williams	9	1	0	0	0	0	1	0	0	0	10	1
3	16	DF	(England) Mark Beevers	6	1	0	0	0	0	2	1	0	0	8	2
3	17	DF	(England) Byron Webster	7	0	1	0	0	0	2	0	0	0	10	0
5	24	MF	(England) Ben Thompson	8	0	1	0	0	0	0	0	0	0	9	0
6	20	FW	(Wales) Steve Morison	6	0	0	0	0	0	0	0	0	0	6	0
6	27	DF	(Antigua and Barbuda) Mahlon Romeo	5	1	0	0	0	0	0	0	0	0	5	1
7	13	GK	(Scotland) Jordan Archer	4	1	0	0	0	0	0	0	0	0	4	1
7	19	MF	(England) Chris Taylor	4	0	0	0	0	0	0	0	1	0	5	0
7	22	FW	(Republic of Ireland) Aiden O'Brien	5	0	0	0	0	0	0	0	0	0	5	0
10	11	MF	(England) Lee Martin	1	0	1	0	1	0	1	0	0	0	4	0
10	~~21~~	MF	(England) George Saville	4	0	0	0	0	0	0	0	0	0	4	0
12	5	DF	(England) Tony Craig	3	0	0	0	0	0	0	0	0	0	3	0
12	8	MF	(England) Ed Upson	3	0	0	0	0	0	0	0	0	0	3	0
12	9	FW	(England) Lee Gregory	2	0	0	0	0	0	1	0	0	0	3	0
12	15	DF	(England) Sid Nelson	2	0	0	0	0	0	1	0	0	0	3	0
12	18	MF	(Northern Ireland) Shane Ferguson	2	0	0	0	0	0	0	0	1	0	3	0
12	26	MF	(Comoros) Jimmy Abdou	3	0	0	0	0	0	0	0	0	0	3	0
18	1	GK	(Republic of Ireland) David Forde	2	0	0	0	0	0	0	0	0	0	2	0
18	~~25~~	MF	(England) Jed Wallace	2	0	0	0	0	0	0	0	0	0	2	0
20	2	DF	(England) Shaun Cummings	1	0	0	0	0	0	0	0	0	0	1	0
20	4	MF	(Trinidad and Tobago) Carlos Edwards	0	1	0	0	0	0	0	0	0	0	0	1
20	10	MF	(Nigeria) Fred Onyedinma	1	0	0	0	0	0	0	0	0	0	1	0
20	28	FW	(England) Jamie Philpot	1	0	0	0	0	0	0	0	0	0	1	0
Total				87	5	4	0	1	0	11	2	2	0	105	6

== Transfers ==
=== Transfers in ===
Date from	Position	Nationality	Name	From	Fee	Ref.
1 July 2015	GK	SCO	Jordan Archer	Tottenham Hotspur	Free transfer	
1 July 2015	LB	ENG	Joe Martin	Gillingham	Free transfer	
1 July 2015	RB	ATG	Mahlon Romeo	Gillingham	Free transfer	
4 July 2015	CB	ENG	Tony Craig	Brentford	Free transfer	
4 August 2015	CF	ENG	Steve Morison	Leeds United	Undisclosed	
6 August 2015	DF	ENG	Christian Mbulu	Brentwood Town	Free transfer	
24 August 2015	RB	TRI	Carlos Edwards	Millwall	Free transfer	
26 January 2016	LM	NIR	Shane Ferguson	Newcastle United	Undisclosed	

=== Transfers out ===
Date from	Position	Nationality	Name	To	Fee	Ref.
1 July 2015	CM	ENG	Nicky Bailey	Barnet	Released	
1 July 2015	LB	GUY	Matthew Briggs	Colchester United (Note: Following Briggs' release he joined Colchester United.)	Free transfer	
1 July 2015	CB	ENG	Dylan Casey	Kingstonian	Released	
1 July 2015	CM	ENG	Richard Chaplow	Doncaster Rovers (Note: Following Chaplow's release he joined Doncaster Rovers.)	Free transfer	
1 July 2015	RB	IRL	Alan Dunne	Leyton Orient	Released	
1 July 2015	RB	TRI	Carlos Edwards	Millwall (Note: Following Edwards overcoming a serious knee injury he re-signed for Millwall.)	—N/a	
1 July 2015	AM	FRA	Sofiane El-Bekri	Free agent	Released	
1 July 2015	CF	JAM	Ricardo Fuller	Oldham Athletic	Released	
1 July 2015	GK	ENG	Denzel Gerrar	Histon (Note: Following Gerrar's release he joined Histon.)	Free transfer	
1 July 2015	CB	ENG	Jake Goodman	Free agent	Margatw	
1 July 2015	LW	SEN	Magaye Gueye	Adanaspor	Released	
1 July 2015	RB	TRI	Justin Hoyte	Dagenham & Redbridge	Released	
1 July 2015	CF	AUT	Stefan Maierhofer	Free agent	Released	
1 July 2015	CM	ESP	Ángel Martínez	Chesterfield (Note: Following Ángel's release he joined Chesterfield.)	Released	
1 July 2015	CB	NGR	Danny Shittu	Free agent	Released	
1 July 2015	RB	ENG	Josh Siafa	Free agent	Released	
1 July 2015	CB	ENG	Callum Webb	Kingstonian	Released	
1 July 2015	LW	ENG	Martyn Woolford	Sheffield United (Note: Following Woolford's release he joined Sheffield United.)	Free transfer	

=== Loans in ===
Date from	Position	Nationality	Name	From	Date until	Ref.
7 August 2015	LM	NIR	Shane Ferguson	Newcastle United	9 January 2016 (Note: On 1 September 2015, Ferguson's loan was extended until 9 January 2016.)	
6 October 2015	CM	ENG	George Saville	Wolverhampton Wanderers	6 November 2016	
8 January 2016	AM	ENG	Jed Wallace	Wolverhampton Wanderers	16 March 2016	
17 March 2016	LM	ENG	Chris Taylor	Blackburn Rovers	End of Season	

=== Loans out ===
Date from	Position	Nationality	Name	To	Date until	Ref.
24 July 2015	GK	ENG	Tom King	Welling United	21 August 2015	
26 September 2015	CF	ENG	Alfie Pavey	Barnet	25 October 2015	
23 November 2015	RW	ENG	Paris Cowan-Hall	Bristol Rovers	22 December 2015	
8 January 2016	CF	ENG	Alfie Pavey	Aldershot Town	7 February 2016	
15 January 2016	LM	ENG	Lee Martin	Northampton Town	14 February 2016	
23 January 2016	RW	ENG	Paris Cowan-Hall	Wycombe Wanderers	End of Season	
19 February 2016	GK	ENG	Tom King	Braintree Town	18 March 2016	
22 February 2016	CF	NIR	John Marquis	Northampton Town	End of Season	

== Competitions ==
=== Pre-season friendlies ===
On 5 May 2015, Millwall announced a pre-season friendly with AFC Wimbledon to take place on 18 July 2015. On 29 May 2015, Millwall added Stevenage to their pre-season schedule. On 1 June 2015, the club announced a friendly against Bromley. On 10 June 2015, Millwall announced they will host Portuguese side Tondela on 1 August 2015.

14 July 2015 Friendly	Bromley	2–2	Millwall	Bromley
19:45 BST	Ademola 10'; Craig O.G 89'	Report	Marquis 48' (pen.); Thompson 56'	Stadium: Fortress Stadium

18 July 2015 Friendly	AFC Wimbledon	1–1	Millwall	Kingston upon Thames
15:00 BST	Taylor 15'	Report	Nelson 90'	Stadium: Kingsmeadow; Attendance: 1,813; Referee: Charles Breakspear

25 July 2015 Friendly	Stevenage	0–1	Millwall	Stevenage
15:00 BST		Report	Beevers 62'	Stadium: Broadhall Way

28 July 2015 Friendly	Millwall XI	2–2	Welling United	Bromley
11:00 BST	Powell; Philpot	Report	Kabba; Obafemi pen.'	Stadium: Millwall Training Ground; Attendance: 0

1 August 2015 Friendly	Millwall	2–3	Tondela	Bermondsey
14:00 BST	Onyedinma 14'; Williams 45'	Report	Tinoco 7'; Wágner 16'; Luís Machado 67'	Stadium: The Den; Attendance: 2,402

=== League One ===
==== League table ====
Pos	Team	Pld	W	D	L	GF	GA	GD	Pts	Promotion, qualification or relegation
2	Burton Albion (P)	46	25	10	11	57	37	+20	85	Promotion to EFL Championship
3	Walsall	46	24	12	10	71	49	+22	84	Qualification for the League One play-offs (Note: Four teams play for one spot and promotion to Football League Championship.)
4	Millwall	46	24	9	13	73	49	+24	81	Qualification for the League One play-offs
5	Bradford City	46	23	11	12	55	40	+15	80	Qualification for the League One play-offs
6	Barnsley (O, P)	46	22	8	16	70	54	+16	74	Qualification for the League One play-offs

Updated to match(es) played on 1 July 2016. Source: BBC Sport
Rules for classification: 1) Points; 2) Goal difference; 3) Number of goals scored
(O) Play-off winners; (P) Promoted

==== Result by matchday ====
Matchday	1	2	3	4	5	6	7	8	9	10	11	12	13	14	15	16	17	18	19	20	21	22	23	24	25	26	27	28	29	30	31	32	33	34	35	36	37	38	39	40	41	42	43	44	45	46
Result	W	L	L	D	L	W	W	L	W	D	L	W	D	W	W	D	W	L	W	L	L	L	W	L	W	W	W	D	W	W	L	W	D	D	W	D	W	L	W	D	W	L	W	W	W	W
Position	6	13	15	15	19	18	12	13	11	12	15	13	14	10	8	7	8	11	7	7	11	11	9	10	7	8	6	6	6	6	6	5	5	5	5	5	4	4	4	4	4	5	4	3	4	4

Updated to match(es) played on 8 May 2016. Source: statto.com
W = Win; D = Draw; L = Loss

==== Matches ====
8 August 2015 1	Shrewsbury Town	1–2	Millwall	Shrewsbury
15:00 BST	Collins 55'	Report	59' Morison; 67' (pen.) Gregory	Stadium: New Meadow; Attendance: 6,671; Referee: Charles Breakspear

15 August 2015 2	Millwall	0–4	Coventry City	Bermondsey
15:00 BST		Report	6', 24' Armstrong; 19' Lameiras; 80' O'Brien	Stadium: The Den; Attendance: 11,197; Referee: Andy Woolmer

18 August 2015 3	Millwall	2–3	Barnsley	Bermondsey
19:45 BST	Onyedinma 26', 82'	BBC Report	38' Winnall; 56' Mawson; 90' Lewin Nyatanga	Stadium: New Den; Attendance: 7,657; Referee: Dean Whitestone

22 August 2015 4	Scunthorpe United	0–0	Millwall	Scunthorpe
15:00 BST		BBC Report		Stadium: Glanford Park; Attendance: 3,382; Referee: Richard Clark

29 August 2015 5	Millwall	0–2	Chesterfield	Bermondsey
15:00 BST		Report	O'Shea 17', 90'	Stadium: New Den; Attendance: 8,374; Referee: Darren Deadman

12 September 2015 7	Crewe Alexandra	1–3	Millwall	Crewe
15:00 BST	Dalla Valle 36'	Report	O'Brien 21', 64', 74'	Stadium: Gresty Road; Attendance: 4,293; Referee: Darren Handley

15 September 2015 6	Port Vale	0–2	Millwall	Burslem
19:45 BST		Report	Beevers 58'; Gregory 90' (pen.)	Stadium: Vale Park; Attendance: 4,477; Referee: Oliver Langford

19 September 2015 8	Millwall	0–2	Southend United	Bermondsey
15:00 BST		Report	Mooney 37'; Barrett 49'	Stadium: New Den; Attendance: 10,228; Referee: Mark Haywood

26 September 2015 9	Millwall	3–1	Rochdale	Bermondsey
15:00 BST	Abdou 4'; Williams 45'; Morison 60'	Report	43' Vincenti	Stadium: New Den; Attendance: 8,023; Referee: James Adcock

29 September 2015 10	Wigan Athletic	2–2	Millwall	Wigan
19:45 BST	Jacobs 54'; Grigg 90'	Report	69' Onyedinma; 74' Beevers	Stadium: DW Stadium; Attendance: 7,991 (238 Away); Referee: Geoff Eltringham

3 October 2015 11	Peterborough United	5–3	Millwall	Peterborough
15:00 BST	Angol 15'; Taylor 19', 81'; Forrester 69'; Washington 72'	Report	52' Webster; 55' Craig; 74' Beevers	Stadium: London Road Stadium; Attendance: 6,402; Referee: Carl Boyeson

17 October 2015 12	Millwall	2–0	Swindon Town	Bermondsey
15:00 BST	Gregory 19'; O'Brien 26'	[]		Stadium: New Den; Attendance: 8,524; Referee: Darren Drysdale

20 October 2015 13	Blackpool	1–1	Millwall	Blackpool
19:45 BST	Redshaw 82' (pen.)	Report	35' Beevers	Stadium: Bloomfield Road; Attendance: 6,225; Referee: Nigel Miller

24 October 2015 14	Sheffield United	1–2	Millwall	Sheffield
12:15 BST	Baxter 70'	Report	O'Brien 30'; O'Brien 80'	Stadium: Bramall Lane; Attendance: 19,617 (870 Away); Referee: Andy Haines

27 October 2015 15	Millwall	2–0	Doncaster Rovers	Bermondsey
19:45 GMT	Morison 5', 8'	Report		Stadium: New Den; Attendance: 8,294; Referee: Charles Breakspear

31 October 2015 16	Millwall	0–0	Bradford City	Bermondsey
15:00 GMT		Report		Stadium: New Den; Attendance: 9,367; Referee: Kevin Johnson

21 November 2015 17	Millwall	4–1	Colchester United	Bermondsey
15:00 GMT	Gregory 13'; Ferguson 38', 62'; Webster 81'	Report	55' Porter	Stadium: New Den; Attendance: 8,739; Referee: Tim Robinson

24 November 2015 18	Fleetwood Town	2–1	Millwall	Fleetwood
19:45 GMT	Jónsson 65'; Grant 89'	Report	Webster 90+4'	Stadium: Highbury Stadium; Attendance: 3,326 (490 Away); Referee: Jeremy Simpson

28 November 2015 19	Millwall	1–0	Bury	Bermondsey
15:00 BST	Williams 13'	Report		Stadium: New Den; Attendance: 8,311; Referee: Dean Whitestone

1 December 2015 20	Burton Albion	2–1	Millwall	Burton Upon Trent
19:45 GMT	McCrory 35'; El Khayati 42'	Report	J. Martin 75'	Stadium: Pirelli Stadium; Attendance: 2,888; Referee: Oliver Langford

19 December 2015 21	Millwall	0–3	Gillingham	Bermondsey
15:00 GMT	Archer (red card)	Report	Samuel 20', 89'; Dack 63' (pen.)	Stadium: New Den; Attendance: 12,032; Referee: Darren Handley

26 December 2015 22	Millwall	0–1	Walsall	Bermondsey
15:00 GMT		Report	Lalkovič 29'	Stadium: New Den; Attendance: 8,364; Referee: Gavin Ward

28 December 2015 23	Southend United	0–4	Millwall	Southend-on-Sea
13:00 GMT		Report	J. Martin 27'; Cummings 35'; Onyedinma 45'; O'Brien 70'	Stadium: Roots Hall; Attendance: 10,099 (1,745 Away); Referee: Kevin Wright

2 January 2016 24	Barnsley	2–1	Millwall	Barnsley
15:00 GMT	Winnall 12'; Hammill 67'	Report	Morison 61'	Stadium: Oakwell; Attendance: 8,700 (385 Away); Referee: James Adcock

9 January 2016 25	Oldham Athletic	1–2	Millwall	Oldham
15:00 GMT	Jones 55'	Report	Gregory 2'; Morison 85'	Stadium: Boundary Park; Attendance: 3,558 (362 Away)

17 January 2015 26	Millwall	3–1	Port Vale	Bermondsey
15:00 GMT	Gregory 14' (34), pen.' Morison 44'	[ Report]	Hooper 66'	Stadium: New Den; Attendance: 7,773; Referee: Andy Davies

23 January 2016 27	Chesterfield	1–2	Millwall	Chesterfield
15:00 GMT	Jones 25'	Report	O'Brien 27'; Gregory 47'	Stadium: Proact Stadium; Attendance: 7,078 (854 Away); Referee: Chris Sarginson

30 January 2015 28	Millwall	1–1	Crewe Alexandra	Bermondsey
15:00 GMT	Archer (yellow card) 59'; Gregory 64' (pen.); Williams (yellow card) 89'	Report	Inman 59' (pen.); Nugent (yellow card) 63'; Ajayi (yellow card) 86'	Stadium: New Den; Attendance: 9,044; Referee: Chris Kavanagh

6 February 2015 29	Walsall	0–3	Millwall	Bermondsey
15:00 GMT		Report	Romeo (yellow card) 14', (goal) 70'; Gregory 61', 77'	Stadium: New Den; Attendance: 4,843 (749 Away); Referee: Trevor Kettle

13 February 2015 30	Rochdale	0–1	Millwall	Rochdale
15:00 GMT		Report	Nelson (yellow card) 50'; Gregory 54'; Martin (yellow card) 57'; Williams (yellow card) 76'	Stadium: Spotland; Attendance: 2,882 (873 Away); Referee: Graham Salisbury

16 February 2016 31	Millwall	0–2	Scunthorpe United	London
19:45 GMT		Report	McSheffrey 17'; O'Brien 90+1'	Stadium: New Den; Attendance: 8,036; Referee: Nick Kinseley

20 February 2016 32	Millwall	3–0	Peterborough United	London
15:00 GMT	Morison 30' 62'; Gregory 49' (yellow card) 66'; Romeo (yellow card) 90+5'	Report	Coulthirst (yellow card) 47'; Beutyman (yellow card) 48'; Bostwick (yellow card) 90+2'	Stadium: New Den; Attendance: 8,722; Referee: Mike Bull

27 February 2016 33	Doncaster Rovers	1–1	Millwall	Doncaster
15:00 GMT	Chaplow 37'	Report	Morison 6'	Stadium: Keepmoat Stadium; Attendance: 6,810 (825 Away); Referee: Carl Boyeson

1 March 2016 34	Millwall	0–0	Wigan Athletic	London
19:45 GMT		Report	Morsy (red card)	Stadium: New Den; Attendance: 7,981; Referee: Lee Collins

5 March 2016 35	Millwall	3–0	Blackpool	London
15:00 GMT	Gregory 8'; Wallace 24'; Morison 84' (pen.)	Report	White (red card)	Stadium: New Den; Attendance: 9,753; Referee: Lee Swabey

12 March 2016 36	Swindon Town	2–2	Millwall	Swindon
15:00 GMT	Thompson (yellow card) 15'; Ajose 63' (pen.); Thompson (yellow card) 69'; Raphael Rossi Branco (yellow card) 71'; Doughty 90+4'	Report	Gregory 6'; Morison 11'; Wallace (yellow card) 69'; Romeo (yellow card) 85'	Stadium: County Ground; Attendance: 8,623; Referee: Kevin Wright

19 March 2016 37	Millwall	1–0	Sheffield United	London
15:00 GMT	Taylor 2'	Report	Done (yellow card) 59'; Basham (yellow card) 90+3'	Stadium: New Den; Attendance: 11,175; Referee: Oliver Langford

26 March 2016 38	Bradford City	1–0	Millwall	Bradford
15:00 GMT	Darby (yellow card) 22'; Davies 79'	Report	Martin (yellow card) 13'; Upson (yellow card) 19'; Webster (yellow card) 60'; Taylor (yellow card) 71'	Stadium: Coral Windows Stadium; Attendance: 18,538; Referee: Darren Bond

28 March 2016 39	Millwall	2–0	Burton Albion	London
19:45 GMT	O'Brien 12'; Gregory 18'; Thompson (yellow card) 21'; Bevvers (yellow card) 74'; Martin (yellow card) 85'; Romeo (yellow card) 90+3'	Report	Mousinho (yellow card) 22'; Beavon (yellow card) 42'; Butcher (yellow card) 75'	Stadium: New Den; Attendance: 8,012; Referee: Keith Stroud

2 April 2016 40	Colchester United	0–0	Millwall	Colchester
15:00 GMT	Ambrose (yellow card) 73'	Report		Stadium: Weston Homes Community Stadium; Attendance: 5,377; Referee: Kevin Johnson

9 April 2016 41	Millwall	3–1	Shrewsbury Town	London
15:00 GMT	Morison (yellow card) 31' (goal) 61'; Thompson 57'; Gregory 90+1' (pen.)	Report	Cole 5'; Hendry (yellow card) 42'; Demetriou (yellow card) 74'; Halstead (red card) 89'	Stadium: New Den; Attendance: 9,583; Referee: Tim Robinson

16 April 2016 42	Coventry City	2–1	Millwall	Coventry
15:00 GMT	Fleck 61'; Tudgay 70'	Report	Webster 19' (yellow card) 90+2'; Williams (red card) 28'; Abdou (yellow card) 84'	Stadium: Ricoh Arena; Attendance: 11,632; Referee: Mark Haywood

19 April 2016 43	Millwall	1–0	Fleetwood Town	London
19:45 GMT	Romeo (yellow card) 30'; Morison 52'; Philpot (yellow card) 58'	Report	Jordan (yellow card) 58'; Pond (yellow card) 60'	Stadium: New Den; Attendance: 7,865; Referee: Ross Joyce

23 April 2016 44	Bury	1–3	Millwall	Bury
15:00 GMT	Lowe 45+2'; Mayor (yellow card) 60'; Soares (yellow card) 80'	Report	Taylor 4', 83', (yellow card) 63'; Morison 33'; Martin (yellow card) 65'	Stadium: Gigg Lane; Attendance: 3,669; Referee: Steve Martin

30 April 2016 45	Millwall	3-0	Oldham Athletic	London
15:00 GMT	Webster 5' 54'; Ferguson 40'	Report		Stadium: New Den; Attendance: 12,419; Referee: (England) Rob Lewis

8 May 2016 46	Gillingham	1-2	Millwall	Gillingham, Kent
12:30 GMT	Dack (yellow card) 79'; Egan 90+2'	Report	O'Brien 55'; Romeo (red card) 86'; Archer (yellow card) 90+2'; Taylor (yellow card) 90+5'; Gregory 90+8' (pen.)	Stadium: MEMS Priestfield Stadium; Attendance: 9,375; Referee: (England) Paul Tierney

=== Play Off ===
15 May 2016 SF First Leg	Bradford City	1–3	Millwall	Bradford
12:15 GMT	McMahon (yellow card) 13' (goal) 13' (pen.)	Report	Gregory 15'; Morison 34'; Martin 45'	Stadium: Coral Windows Stadium; Attendance: 19,241; Referee: (England) Dean Whitestone

20 May 2016 SF Second Leg	Millwall	1–1 (4–2 agg.)	Bradford City	London
19:45 GMT	Gregory 34'; Taylor (yellow card) 86'; Ferguson (yellow card) 86'	Report	Proctor 44'; Evans (yellow card) 79'; McArdle (yellow card) 85'; Reid (yellow card) 88'	Stadium: New Den; Attendance: 16,301; Referee: (England) Tim Robinson

29 May 2016 Final	Barnsley	3–1	Millwall	London
15:00 GMT	Fletcher 2'; Hammill 19'; Isgrove 74'	Report	Beevers 34'	Stadium: Wembley Stadium; Attendance: 51,277

=== FA Cup ===
8 November 2015 First round	Millwall	3–1	AFC Fylde	Bermondsey
15:00 BST	54' O'Brien; 60' Gregory; 88' Morison	Report	Whittle 62'	Stadium: The Den; Attendance: 3,445; Referee: Steve Martin

5 December 2015 Second round	Millwall	1–2	Wycombe Wanderers	Bermondsey
15:00 BST	Thompson 57'	Report	50' Hayes; 90' Harriman	Stadium: The Den; Attendance: 3,960

=== League Cup ===
On 16 June 2015, the first round draw was made, Millwall were drawn at home against Barnet.

11 August 2015 First round	Millwall	1–2 (a.e.t.)	Barnet	Bermondsey
19:45 BST	Morison 76'	Report	11' (pen.) Akinde; 102' Yiadom	Stadium: The Den; Attendance: 4,454; Referee: Andy Madley

=== Football League Trophy ===
On 8 August 2015, live on Soccer AM the draw for the first round of the Football League Trophy was drawn by Toni Duggan and Alex Scott. Lions will host Peterborough United. On 5 September 2015, the second round draw was shown live on Soccer AM and drawn by Charlie Austin and Ed Skrein. Millwall are to host Northampton Town.

1 September 2015 First round	Millwall	1–0	Peterborough United	Bermondsey
19:45 BST	Williams 90'	Report		Stadium: The Den; Attendance: 2,050; Referee: Keith Hill

6 October 2015 Second round	Millwall	2–0	Northampton Town	Bermondsey
19:45 BST	O'Brien 71'; Gregory 75'	Report		Stadium: The Den; Attendance: 2,254

10 November 2015 Area Quarter-finals	Plymouth Argyle	3–5	Millwall	Plymouth
19:45 BST	Jervis 34', 85'; Carey 55'	Report	Gregory 21', 43', 49', 58' (pen.); O'Brien 66'	Stadium: Home Park; Attendance: 5,869 (295 away)

8 December 2015 Area Semi-finals	Southend United	0-2	Millwall	Southend-on-sea
19:45 BST		Report	Morison 34'; Williams 65'	Stadium: Roots Hall; Attendance: 5,972 (1,551 away)

14 January 2016 Area finals – First leg	Millwall	0-2	Oxford United	Bermondsey
19:45 BST		Report	Roofe 15', 43'	Stadium: The Den; Attendance: 7,275

2 February 2016 Area finals – Second leg	Oxford United	0-1	Millwall	Oxford
19:45 BST		Report	Gregory 54'; Beevers 76	Stadium: Kassam Stadium; Attendance: 10,138 (1,478 away)
