= 2018–19 Millwall F.C. season =

Millwall F.C.
2018–19 season
- Chairman: John Berylson
- Manager: Neil Harris
- Stadium: The Den
- Championship: 21st
- FA Cup: Quarter-finals (eliminated by Brighton & Hove Albion)
- EFL Cup: Third round (eliminated by Fulham)
- Top goalscorer: League: Lee Gregory (7); All: Lee Gregory (10)
- Highest home attendance: 17,195 (vs Leeds United)
- Lowest home attendance: 3,645 (vs Plymouth Argyle)
- Average home league attendance: 13,455
- Biggest win: 3–0 (vs Ipswich, 27 Oct 2018)
- Biggest defeat: 0–2 (vs QPR, 19 Sep 2018)
Home colours	Away colours	Third colours

The 2018–19 season was Millwall's 134th year in existence, 93rd consecutive season in The Football League, and 42nd in the second tier. Millwall competed in the Championship, FA Cup, and League Cup. This season Millwall broke their club transfer fee record that they've paid for a player twice, firstly buying Tom Bradshaw from Barnsley for £1.25 million, and then a week later buying midfielder Ryan Leonard from Sheffield United for £1.5 million. They also broke the record received for a player, selling George Saville to Middlesbrough for £8 million. Millwall knocked out Premier League side Everton on the way to reaching the FA Cup Quarter-final for the eleventh time in their history. Millwall spent the majority of the season in a relegation battle, securing their place in the Championship with two games to spare at the expense of Rotherham. The season covers the period from 1 July 2018 to 30 June 2019.

== Pre-season ==
=== Friendlies ===
Millwall announced pre-season friendlies against Dartford, Cambridge United Colchester United and VfL Bochum.

7 July 2018 Friendly	Dartford	0–5	Millwall	Dartford
12:00 BST		Report	Wallace 2', 31'; O'Brien 34'; Romeo 36'; Morison 44'	Stadium: Princes Park; Referee: Charlie Breakspear

21 July 2018 Friendly	Cambridge United	0–2	Millwall	Cambridge
15:00 BST		Report	Elliott 74'; O'Brien 82'	Stadium: Abbey Stadium; Attendance: 1,312; Referee: Alan Young

24 July 2018 Friendly	Colchester United	2–1	Millwall	Colchester
19:45 BST	Szmodics 20'; Vincent-Young 31'	Report	Wallace 90'	Stadium: Colchester Community Stadium; Referee: Craig Hicks

== Competitions ==
=== Championship ===
==== League table ====
Pos	Team	Pld	W	D	L	GF	GA	GD	Pts	Promotion, qualification or relegation
18	Wigan Athletic	46	13	13	20	51	64	−13	52	
19	Queens Park Rangers	46	14	9	23	53	71	−18	51	
20	Reading	46	10	17	19	49	66	−17	47	
21	Millwall	46	10	14	22	48	64	−16	44	
22	Rotherham United (R)	46	8	16	22	52	83	−31	40	Relegation to EFL League One
23	Bolton Wanderers (R)	46	8	8	30	29	78	−49	32 (Note: Brentford were awarded a 1–0 win over Bolton due to Bolton's inability to hold the fixture.)	Relegation to EFL League One
24	Ipswich Town (R)	46	5	16	25	36	77	−41	31	Relegation to EFL League One

Source: Sky Sports Archived 25 September 2019 at the Wayback Machine
Rules for classification: 1) Points; 2) Goal difference; 3) Number of goals scored; 4) Head-to-head results
(R) Relegated

==== Results by matchday ====
Matchday	1	2	3	4	5	6	7	8	9	10	11	12	13	14	15	16	17	18	19	20	21	22	23	24	25	26	27	28	29	30	31	32	33	34	35	36	37	38	39	40	41	42	43	44	45	46
Ground	H	A	H	A	A	H	H	A	A	H	A	H	A	H	H	A	A	H	H	A	H	A	A	H	H	A	H	A	H	A	H	A	H	A	H	A	A	A	H	H	A	H	A	H	H	A
Result	D	D	W	L	L	L	D	L	L	L	D	W	L	W	W	L	L	D	L	D	D	L	L	W	W	W	L	D	D	L	D	W	L	L	L	L	W	L	W	D	D	D	L	D	L	L
Position	11	16	9	14	16	16	19	21	22	23	22	20	22	19	18	19	21	20	21	22	21	22	22	20	20	19	20	19	20	20	20	19	20	20	20	21	19	21	20	19	20	21	21	21	21	21

Updated to match(es) played on 5 May 2019. Source: BBC Sport
A = Away; H = Home; W = Win; D = Draw; L = Loss

==== Result summary ====
Overall								Home						Away					
Pld	W	D	L	GF	GA	GD	Pts	W	D	L	GF	GA	GD	W	D	L	GF	GA	GD
46	10	14	22	48	64	−16	44	7	9	7	26	27	−1	3	5	15	22	37	−15

Last updated: 5 May 2019.
Source: BBC Sport

==== Matches ====
On 21 June 2018, the Championship fixtures for the forthcoming season were announced.

4 August 2018 1	Millwall	2–2	Middlesbrough	Bermondsey
15:00 BST	O'Brien 12'; Gregory 37'	Report	Braithwaite 87'; Friend 90+7'	Stadium: The Den; Attendance: 15,056; Referee: Kevin Friend

11 August 2018 2	Blackburn Rovers	0–0	Millwall	Blackburn
15:00 BST		Report		Stadium: Ewood Park; Attendance: 13,239; Referee: Gavin Ward

18 August 2018 3	Millwall	2–1	Derby County	Bermondsey
15:00 BST	Gregory 7'; Williams 20'; Cooper (yellow card) 61'	Report	Nugent (yellow card) 72', (goal) 73'	Stadium: The Den; Attendance: 13,557; Referee: Steve Martin

22 August 2018 4	Sheffield Wednesday	2–1	Millwall	Owlerton
19:45 BST	Bannan 16'; Lees 46'	Report	Tunnicliffe 72'	Stadium: Hillsborough Stadium; Attendance: 21,349; Referee: Andrew Madley

26 August 2018 5	Rotherham United	1–0	Millwall	Rotherham
12:30 BST	Raggett 20'	Report		Stadium: New York Stadium; Referee: Geoff Eltringham

1 September 2018 6	Millwall	1–2	Swansea City	Bermondsey
17:30 BST	Wallace 62'	Report	Baker-Richardson (red card) 5'; Naughton 76'; McBurnie 85'	Stadium: The Den; Attendance: 12,440; Referee: Graham Scott

15 September 2018 7	Millwall	1–1	Leeds United	Bermondsey
15:00 BST	Wallace 55'	Report	Harrison 89'	Stadium: The Den; Attendance: 17,195; Referee: Chris Kavanagh

19 September 2018 8	Queens Park Rangers	2–0	Millwall	Shepherd's Bush
19:45 BST	Luongo 30'; Eze 32'	Report		Stadium: Loftus Road Stadium; Attendance: 12,398; Referee: Robert Jones

22 September 2018 9	West Bromwich Albion	2–0	Millwall	West Bromwich
15:00 BST	Gayle 68'; Gibbs 76'	Report		Stadium: The Hawthorns; Attendance: 23,563; Referee: Tim Robinson

29 September 2018 10	Millwall	2–3	Sheffield United	Bermondsey
15:00 BST	Cooper 47'; Gregory 50'	Report	Sharp 40'; McGoldrick 79' (pen.), 88'	Stadium: The Den; Attendance: 13,145; Referee: Andy Davies

3 October 2018 11	Nottingham Forest	2–2	Millwall	West Bridgford
19:45 BST	Lolley 27'; Carvalho 70'	Report	Williams 75'; Gregory 90+1'	Stadium: City Ground; Attendance: 25,753; Referee: Jonathan Moss

6 October 2018 12	Millwall	2–1	Aston Villa	Bermondsey
15:00 BST	Elliott (yellow card) 4', (goal) 48'; Ferguson 26'	Report	Abraham 7'; Bolasie (yellow card) 71'	Stadium: The Den; Attendance: 14,491; Referee: Tony Harrington

20 October 2018 13	Reading	3–1	Millwall	Reading
15:00 BST (UTC+1)	Méïté 28', 86'; Baldock 45' (pen.); Rinomhota (yellow card) 90+6'	Report	Wallace 34'; Romeo (yellow card) 44'; Cooper (yellow card) 59'	Stadium: Madejski Stadium; Attendance: 14,532; Referee: David Webb

23 October 2018 14	Millwall	2–1	Wigan Athletic	Bermondsey
15:00 BST	Williams 60' (pen.); Morison 82'	Report	Wallace 45+2' (o.g.)	Stadium: The Den; Attendance: 11,190; Referee: James Linington

27 October 2018 15	Millwall	3–0	Ipswich Town	Bermondsey
15:00 BST	Gregory 26', 51'; Leonard 70'	Report	Pennington (yellow card) 57'	Stadium: The Den; Attendance: 15,386; Referee: Robert Jones

3 November 2018 16	Brentford	2–0	Millwall	Brentford
15:00 GMT	Sawyers (yellow card) 25'; Canós 48'; Watkins 85'	Report	Leonard (yellow card) 32'	Stadium: Griffin Park; Attendance: 9,476; Referee: Simon Hooper

10 November 2018 17	Norwich City	4–3	Millwall	Norwich
15:00 GMT	Pukki 49', 90+7'; Leitner 79'; Rhodes 90+2'	Report	Elliott 24'; Leonard 81'; Wallace 83'	Stadium: Carrow Road; Attendance: 26,289; Referee: Jeremy Simpson

24 November 2018 18	Millwall	1–1	Bolton Wanderers	Bermondsey
15:00 GMT	Cooper 82'	Report	Beevers 12'	Stadium: The Den; Attendance: 12,554; Referee: Lee Swabey

28 November 2018 19	Millwall	0–2	Birmingham City	Bermondsey
19:45 GMT	Leonard (red card) 30'	Report	Meredith 11' (o.g.); Morrison 76'	Stadium: The Den; Attendance: 11,644; Referee: Scott Duncan

2 December 2018 20	Bristol City	1–1	Millwall	Bristol
13:30 GMT	Cooper 52' (o.g.)	Report	Williams 78'	Stadium: Ashton Gate Stadium; Referee: Darren England

8 December 2018 21	Millwall	2–2	Hull City	Bermondsey, London
15:00 GMT	Gregory 22'; O'Brien 54'	Report	Grosicki 6'; Batty (yellow card) 68'; Henriksen 73'; Martin (yellow card) 76'	Stadium: The Den; Attendance: 12,004; Referee: Keith Stroud

15 December 2018 22	Preston North End	3–2	Millwall	Preston
	Davies (yellow card) 15'; Browne 37'; Barkhuizen 42'; Hughes 81'	Report	Romeo (yellow card) 5'; Cooper 61', (yellow card) 80'; Wallace (yellow card) 69'; Gregory 90+3'	Stadium: Deepdale; Attendance: 10,924; Referee: John Brooks

22 December 2018 23	Stoke City	1–0	Millwall	Stoke-on-Trent
	Berahino 61'; Clucas (yellow card) 83'	Report	Elliott (yellow card) 65'; Wallace (yellow card) 89'; Hutchinson (yellow card) 90+2'	Stadium: bet365 Stadium; Attendance: 25,351; Referee: Chris Kavanagh

26 December 2018 24	Millwall	1–0	Reading	London
	Wallace 8'; Elliott (yellow card) 38'; Gregory (yellow card) 53'; Feguson (yellow card) 77'	Report	Blackett (red card) 9'; Moore (yellow card) 67'; Bacuna (red card) 88'	Stadium: The Den; Attendance: 12,202; Referee: Andy Davies

29 December 2018 25	Millwall	1–0	Nottingham Forest	London
	Tunnicliffe 9'; Leonard (yellow card) 15'; Karacan (yellow card) 90+5'	Report	Yacob (yellow card) 31'; Robinson (yellow card) 81'	Stadium: The Den; Attendance: 15,273; Referee: Tony Harrington

1 January 2019 26	Ipswich Town	2–3	Millwall	Ipswich
15:00 GMT	Lankaster 2'; Jackson 89'	Report	Ferguson 60' (pen.); Morison (yellow card) 66'; Cooper 68'; Elliott 76'	Stadium: Portman Road; Attendance: 16,957; Referee: Steve Martin

12 January 2019 27	Millwall	0–2	Blackburn Rovers	Bermondsey
17:30 GMT		Report	Nuttall 86'; Armstrong 87'	Stadium: The Den; Attendance: 13,862; Referee: Robert Jones

19 January 2019 28	Middlesbrough	1–1	Millwall	Middlesbrough
15:00 GMT	Howson (yellow card) 20'; Ayala (yellow card) 77'; Hugill 90' (pen.); Batth (yellow card) 90+4'	Report	Wallace 22'; Hutchinson (yellow card) 53'	Stadium: Riverside Stadium; Attendance: 21,915; Referee: Keith Stroud

2 February 2019 29	Millwall	0–0	Rotherham United	London
15:00 GMT		Report	Robertson (yellow card) 40'; Wood (yellow card) 58'; Crooks (yellow card) 86'; Vassell (yellow card) 90+1'	Stadium: The Den; Attendance: 12,084; Referee: Andy Madley

9 February 2019 30	Swansea City	1–0	Millwall	Swansea
15:00 GMT	Byers 43'	Report	Marshall (yellow card) 42'; Archer (yellow card) 86'	Stadium: Liberty Stadium; Attendance: 18,650; Referee: Kevin Friend

12 February 2019 31	Millwall	0–0	Sheffield Wednesday	Bermondsey
19:45 GMT	Cooper (yellow card) 83'	Report	Bannan (yellow card) 59'; Fletcher (yellow card) 66'	Stadium: The Den; Attendance: 11,828; Referee: Tim Robinson

20 February 2019 32	Derby County	0–1	Millwall	Derby
19:45 GMT	Huddlestone (yellow card) 42'; Keogh (yellow card) 63'	Report	Marshall (yellow card) 44'; Wallace 72'; Williams (yellow card) 87'; Elliott (yellow card) 90+5'	Stadium: Pride Park Stadium; Attendance: 24,907; Referee: James Linington

23 February 2019 33	Millwall	1–3	Preston North End	Bermondsey
15:00 GMT	Thompson 67'; Williams (yellow card) 73'; Wallace (yellow card) 89'	Report	Hughes 4'; Clarke 16'; Maguire 27'; Pearson (yellow card) 85'	Stadium: The Den; Attendance: 13,265; Referee: Stephen Martin

26 February 2019 34	Hull City	2–1	Millwall	Kingston upon Hull
19:45 GMT	Bowen 8'; Pugh 42'; Lichaj (yellow card) 90+2'	Report	Marshall (yellow card) 30'; Hutchinson 34'; Cooper (yellow card) 66'	Stadium: KCOM Stadium; Attendance: 10,191; Referee: Darren Bond

2 March 2019 35	Millwall	1–3	Norwich City	Bermondsey
15:00 GMT	Meredith (yellow card) 32'; Thompson (yellow card) 39'; Williams 45'	Report	Stiepermann 16'; Zimmermann 69'; Pukki 79'	Stadium: The Den; Attendance: 16,748; Referee: David Webb

9 March 2019 36	Bolton Wanderers	2–1	Millwall	Horwich
15:00 GMT	Olkowski 48'; O'Neil 60'	Report	Williams (yellow card) 6'; Elliott (yellow card) 84'; Gregory 87'; Ferguson (yellow card) 90+2'	Stadium: University of Bolton Stadium; Attendance: 13,035; Referee: Simon Hooper

13 March 2019 37	Birmingham City	0–2	Millwall	Birmingham
19:45 GMT	Vassell (yellow card) 4'	Report	Thompson 13', 32'; Marshall (yellow card) 61'; Cooper (yellow card) 65'	Stadium: St Andrew's; Attendance: 20,151; Referee: John Brooks

30 March 2019 38	Leeds United	3–2	Millwall	Leeds
15:00 GMT	Bamford (penalty missed) 19'; Hernández 34', 83'; Cooper (yellow card) 55'; Jansson (yellow card) 65'; Ayling 71'; Clarke (yellow card) 90+4'	Report	Meredith (yellow card) 7'; Thompson 10'; Cooper (yellow card) 30'; Marshall 55' (pen.) (yellow card) 74'; Martin (yellow card) 82'	Stadium: Elland Road; Attendance: 34,910; Referee: Darren Bond

6 April 2019 39	Millwall	2–0	West Bromwich Albion	Bermondsey
15:00 BST	Tunnicliffe 30'; Meredith (yellow card) 51'; Cooper (yellow card) 60'; Hegazi 66' (o.g.); Leonard (yellow card) 90'	Report	Johansen (yellow card) 44'; Hegazi (yellow card) 45+2' (yellow-red card) 80'; Rodriguez (penalty missed) 61'; Adarabioyo (yellow card) 67'	Stadium: The Den; Attendance: 15,303; Referee: James Linington

10 April 2019 40	Millwall	0–0	Queens Park Rangers	Bermondsey
19:45 BST	Marshall (yellow card) 14'; Tunnicliffe (yellow card) 30'	Report	Lynch (yellow card) 24'; Manning (yellow card) 33'; Luongo (yellow card) 49'	Stadium: The Den; Attendance: 13,132; Referee: John Brooks

13 April 2019 41	Sheffield United	1–1	Millwall	Sheffield
15:00 BST	Madine 51'; Fleck (yellow card) 62'; Egan (red card) 85'	Report	Wallace (yellow card) 59'; Marshall (penalty missed) 87'; Cooper (yellow card) 90+5' (goal) 90+5'	Stadium: Bramall Lane; Attendance: 26,703; Referee: David Webb

19 April 2019 42	Millwall	1–1	Brentford	Bermondsey
13:00 BST	Gregory 15'; Elliott (yellow card) 67'	Report	Dasilva 20'; Canós (yellow card) 27'; Dalsgaard (red card) 35'; Marcondes (yellow card) 67'; Sawyers (yellow card) 82'	Stadium: The Den; Attendance: 14,530; Referee: Jeremy Simpson

22 April 2019 43	Aston Villa	1–0	Millwall	Aston
13:00 BST	Kodjia 30'; Taylor (yellow card) 81'; Davis (yellow card) 85'	Report	Cooper (yellow card) 27'; O'Brien (yellow card) 90+3'	Stadium: Villa Park; Attendance: 39,839; Referee: Tim Robinson

27 April 2019 44	Millwall	0–0	Stoke City	Bermondsey
13:30 BST	Leonard (yellow card) 75'	Report	Shawcross (yellow card) 74'; McClean (yellow card) 84'	Stadium: The Den; Attendance: 14,472; Referee: Oliver Langford

30 April 2019 45	Millwall	1–2	Bristol City	Bermondsey
19:45 BST	Gregory 41'; Williams (penalty missed) 73'	Report	Brownhill (yellow card) 24'; Walsh (yellow card) 45+2'; Palmer (yellow card) 58'; Paterson 76'; Diédhiou 81'	Stadium: The Den; Attendance: 12,261; Referee: Andrew Madley

5 May 2019 46	Wigan Athletic	1–0	Millwall	Wigan
12:30 BST	Garner 15'	Report		Stadium: DW Stadium; Attendance: 10,859; Referee: Andy Woolmer

=== FA Cup ===
The third round draw was made live on BBC by Ruud Gullit and Paul Ince from Stamford Bridge on 3 December 2018. The fourth round draw was made live on BBC by Robbie Keane and Carl Ikeme from Wolverhampton on 7 January 2019. The fifth round draw was broadcast on 28 January 2019 live on BBC, Alex Scott and Ian Wright conducted the draw. Draw for the quarter-final was made on 18 February by Darren Fletcher & Wayne Bridge.

6 January 2019 Third round	Millwall	2–1	Hull City	Bermondsey
14:00 GMT	Ferguson 82', 85'	Report	Toral 52'; Mazuch (yellow card) 84'; Batty (yellow card) 90+2'	Stadium: The Den; Attendance: 5,307; Referee: Andy Woolmer

26 January 2019 Fourth round	Millwall	3–2	Everton	Bermondsey
17:30 GMT	Gregory 45+2'; Wallace (yellow card) 67', (goal) 90+4'; Cooper 75'	Report	Richarlison 43'; Tosun 72', (yellow card) 76'; Gueye (yellow card) 76'	Stadium: The Den; Attendance: 16,354; Referee: Michael Oliver

16 February 2019 Fifth round	AFC Wimbledon	0–1	Millwall	Kingston upon Thames
15:00 GMT	Wordsworth (yellow card) 69'	Report	Wallace 5' (yellow card) 75'	Stadium: Kingsmeadow; Attendance: 4,795; Referee: Jonathan Moss

17 March 2019 Quarter-finals	Millwall	2–2 (a.e.t.) (4–5 p)	Brighton & Hove Albion	Bermondsey
14:00 GMT	Pearce 70'; O'Brien 79'; Ferguson (red card) 119'	Report	Bernardo (yellow card) 35'; Montoya (yellow card) 69'; Locadia 88'; March 90+5'	Stadium: The Den; Attendance: 17,137; Referee: Chris Kavanagh
	Penalties
	Williams (penalty scored); Tunnicliffe (penalty scored); Leonard (penalty scored); Romeo (penalty missed); Morison (penalty scored); Cooper (penalty missed)		Murray (penalty missed); Locadia (penalty scored); March (penalty scored); Pröpper (penalty scored); Stephens (penalty scored); Dunk (penalty scored)

=== EFL Cup ===
On 15 June 2018, the draw for the first round was made in Vietnam. The second round draw was made from the Stadium of Light on 16 August. The third round draw was made on 30 August 2018 by David Seaman and Joleon Lescott.

14 August 2018 First round	Millwall	0–0 (3–1 p)	Gillingham	Bermondsey
19:45 BST		Report		Stadium: The Den; Attendance: 4,401; Referee: Charles Breakspear
	Penalties
	Elliott (penalty scored); Webster (penalty scored); Ferguson (penalty scored)		O'Neill (penalty scored); Parker (penalty missed); Hanlan (penalty missed)

29 August 2018 Second round	Millwall	3–2	Plymouth Argyle	Bermondsey
19:45 BST	Williams 64' (pen.); Gregory 83'; O'Brien 89'	Report	Ness 41'; Ladapo 67'	Stadium: The Den; Attendance: 3,645; Referee: Darren England

25 September 2018 Third round	Millwall	1–3	Fulham	Bermondsey
19:45 BST	Elliott 61'	Report	Bryan 7' de la Torre 52'; Christie 68'	Stadium: The Den; Attendance: 5,839; Referee: Darren Bond

== Squad ==
No.	Name	Pos.	Nat.	Place of Birth	Age	Apps	Goals	Signed from	Date signed	Fee	Ends
Goalkeepers
1	Jordan Archer	GK	(Scotland) (England)	Walthamstow	33	166	0	Tottenham Hotspur	22 June 2015	Free	2019
13	Ben Amos	GK	(England)	Macclesfield	36	15	0	Bolton Wanderers	13 July 2018	Loan	2019
16	David Martin	GK	(England)	London	40	15	0	Milton Keynes Dons	1 September 2017	Free	2019
40	Ryan Sandford	GK	(England)		27	0	0	Academy	1 July 2017	Trainee	
Defenders
2	Conor McLaughlin	RB	(Northern Ireland)	Belfast	35	37	1	Fleetwood Town	5 July 2017	Free	2019
3	James Meredith	LB	(Australia)	Albury	38	85	0	Bradford City	1 July 2017	Undisclosed	Undisclosed
4	Shaun Hutchinson	CB	(England)	Newcastle upon Tyne	35	99	5	Fulham	1 July 2016	Free	2020
5	Jake Cooper	CB	(England)	Ascot	31	111	13	Reading	28 July 2017	Undisclosed	2020
12	Mahlon Romeo	RB	(Antigua and Barbuda) (England)	Westminster	31	136	3	Gillingham	5 May 2015	Free	Undisclosed
15	Alex Pearce	CB	(England)	Wallingford	37	15	1	Derby County	4 January 2019	Loan	2019
25	Murray Wallace	CB/LB	(Scotland)	Glasgow	33	27	4	Scunthorpe United	1 July 2018	Undisclosed	Undisclosed
27	James Brown	DF	(England)	Dover	28	0	0	Academy	7 April 2016	Trainee	Undisclosed
	Sid Nelson	CB	(England)	Lewisham	30	38	0	Academy	1 July 2013	Trainee	2019
Midfielders
6	Shaun Williams	DM	(Republic of Ireland)	Dublin	39	232	20	Milton Keynes Dons	27 January 2014	Undisclosed	Undisclosed
7	Jed Wallace	RM/AM	(England)	Reading	32	130	16	Wolverhampton Wanderers	1 July 2017	Undisclosed	2020
8	Ben Thompson	CM	(England)	Sidcup	30	106	8	Academy	1 July 2014	Trainee	Undisclosed
10	Fred Onyedinma	AM	(Nigeria) (England)	Plumstead	29	151	12	Academy	1 July 2013	Trainee	2020
11	Shane Ferguson	LM	(Northern Ireland)	Derry	35	168	12	Newcastle United	26 January 2016	Undisclosed	Undisclosed
18	Ryan Tunnicliffe	CM	(England)	Heywood	33	59	4	Fulham	29 July 2017	Free	2019
26	Jiří Skalák	LW	(Czech Republic)	Pardubice	34	19	0	Brighton & Hove Albion	2 August 2018	Undisclosed	Undisclosed
28	Ryan Leonard	CM	(England)	Plympton	34	40	2	Sheffield United	1 January 2019	£1,500,000	Undisclosed
32	Dan McNamara	MF	(England)		27	0	0	Academy	1 July 2018	Trainee	2020
34	Harry Donovan	CM	(England)	London	27	0	0	Academy	10 February 2017	Trainee	2018
37	Lewis White	MF	(England)		27	0	0	Academy	1 July 2017	Trainee	2019
44	Ben Marshall	RM	(England)	Salford	35	32	4	Norwich City	16 January 2019	Loan	2019
Forwards
9	Lee Gregory	CF	(England)	Sheffield	38	238	77	Halifax Town	17 June 2014	£250,000	2019
14	Tom Bradshaw	CF	(Wales) (England)	Shrewsbury	34	9	0	Barnlsey	1 January 2019	£1,250,000	Undisclosed
19	Tom Elliott	CF	(England)	Leeds	35	66	9	AFC Wimbledon	1 July 2017	Free	2020
20	Steve Morison	CF	(Wales) (England)	Enfield	43	336	92	Leeds United	4 August 2015	Free	2020
22	Aiden O'Brien	CF	(Republic of Ireland) (England)	Islington	32	205	40	Academy	1 August 2011	Trainee	Undisclosed
Out on loan
—	Tom King	GK	(England)	Croydon	31	20	0	Crystal Palace	31 August 2014	Free	2019

=== Statistics ===
As of 16 May 2019

No.	Pos	Nat	Player	Total		Championship		FA Cup		League Cup	
No.	Pos	Nat	Player	Apps	Goals	Apps	Goals	Apps	Goals	Apps	Goals
1	GK	(Scotland) SCO	Jordan Archer	27	0	24+0	0	3+0	0	0+0	0
2	DF	(Northern Ireland) NIR	Conor McLaughlin	11	0	6+2	0	0+0	0	3+0	0
3	DF	(England) ENG	James Meredith	38	0	33+3	0	0+1	0	1+0	0
4	DF	(England) ENG	Shaun Hutchinson	29	1	24+2	1	1+2	0	0+0	0
5	DF	(England) ENG	Jake Cooper	51	7	46+0	6	4+0	1	1+0	0
6	MF	(Republic of Ireland) IRL	Shaun Williams	37	6	30+1	5	3+1	0	1+1	1
7	MF	(England) ENG	Jed Wallace	47	5	40+1	5	3+0	0	0+3	0
8	MF	(England) ENG	Ben Thompson	14	4	12+1	4	0+0	0	1+0	0
9	FW	(England) ENG	Lee Gregory	50	13	42+2	10	3+0	1	1+2	2
10	MF	(Nigeria) NGR	Fred Onyedinma	3	0	0+1	0	0+0	0	2+0	0
11	MF	(Northern Ireland) NIR	Shane Ferguson	42	4	26+9	2	3+1	2	3+0	0
12	DF	(Antigua and Barbuda) ANT	Mahlon Romeo	46	0	39+1	0	4+0	0	1+1	0
13	GK	(England) ENG	Ben Amos	15	0	12+0	0	0+0	0	3+0	0
14	FW	(Wales) WAL	Tom Bradshaw	10	0	2+8	0	0+0	0	0+0	0
15	DF	(Republic of Ireland) IRL	Alex Pearce	15	1	11+0	0	3+1	1	0+0	0
16	GK	(England) ENG	David Martin	11	0	10+0	0	1+0	0	0+0	0
18	MF	(England) ENG	Ryan Tunnicliffe	31	3	22+4	3	3+0	0	2+0	0
19	FW	(England) ENG	Tom Elliott	38	3	16+17	3	1+1	0	3+0	0
20	FW	(Wales) WAL	Steve Morison	44	1	15+26	1	0+3	0	0+0	0
22	FW	(Republic of Ireland) IRL	Aiden O'Brien	41	3	14+21	2	4+0	0	0+2	1
25	DF	(Scotland) SCO	Murray Wallace	27	4	19+2	2	3+0	2	3+0	0
26	MF	(Czech Republic) CZE	Jiří Skalák	19	0	4+10	0	1+1	0	3+0	0
28	MF	(England) ENG	Ryan Leonard	40	2	36+0	2	4+0	0	0+0	0
42	MF	(England) ENG	Billy Mitchell	1	0	0+1	0	0+0	0	0+0	0
44	MF	(England) ENG	Ben Marshall	16	1	13+3	1	0+0	0	0+0	0
50	FW	(England) ENG	George Alexander	1	0	0+1	0	0+0	0	0+0	0
Players who left the club:
17	DF	(England) ENG	Byron Webster	6	0	2+2	0	0+0	0	2+0	0
21	MF	(Turkey) TUR	Jem Karacan	6	0	0+4	0	0+0	0	2+0	0
23	MF	(England) ENG	George Saville	4	0	4+0	0	0+0	0	0+0	0

=== Goals record ===
As of 16 May 2019

Rank	No.	Nat.	Po.	Name	Championship	FA Cup	League Cup	Total
1	9	(England)	CF	Lee Gregory	10	1	2	13
2	5	(England)	CB	Jake Cooper	6	1	0	7
3	6	(Republic of Ireland)	DM	Shaun Williams	5	0	1	6
4	7	(England)	RM	Jed Wallace	5	0	0	5
5	8	(England)	CM	Ben Thompson	4	0	0	4
5	11	(Northern Ireland)	LM	Shane Ferguson	2	2	0	4
5	22	(Republic of Ireland)	CF	Aiden O'Brien	2	1	1	4
5	25	(Scotland)	CB	Murray Wallace	2	2	0	4
9	18	(England)	CM	Ryan Tunnicliffe	3	0	0	3
9	19	(England)	CF	Tom Elliott	3	0	0	3
11	28	(England)	CM	Ryan Leonard	2	0	0	2
12	4	(England)	CB	Shaun Hutchinson	1	0	0	1
12	15	(Republic of Ireland)	CB	Alex Pearce	0	1	0	1
12	20	(Wales)	CF	Steve Morison	1	0	0	1
12	44	(England)	LM	Ben Marshall	1	0	0	1
Total					47	8	4	59

=== Disciplinary record ===
As of 16 May 2019

Rank	No.	Nat.	Po.	Name	Championship			FA Cup			League Cup			Total		
Rank	No.	Nat.	Po.	Name	Booked	(yellow card) (yellow-red card)	Sent off (straight red)	Booked	(yellow card) (yellow-red card)	Sent off (straight red)	Booked	(yellow card) (yellow-red card)	Sent off (straight red)	Booked	(yellow card) (yellow-red card)	Sent off (straight red)
1	5	(England)	CB	Jake Cooper	10	0	0	0	0	0	0	0	0	10	0	0
2	7	(England)	RM	Jed Wallace	9	0	0	0	0	0	0	0	0	9	0	0
3	28	(England)	CM	Ryan Leonard	6	1	0	0	0	0	0	0	0	6	1	0
4	19	(England)	CF	Tom Elliott	7	0	0	0	0	0	0	0	0	7	0	0
5	4	(England)	CB	Shaun Hutchinson	6	0	0	0	0	0	0	0	0	6	0	0
5	44	(England)	LM	Ben Marshall	6	0	0	0	0	0	0	0	0	6	0	0
8	6	(Republic of Ireland)	DM	Shaun Williams	5	0	0	0	0	0	0	0	0	5	0	0
8	11	(Northern Ireland)	LM	Shane Ferguson	4	0	0	0	0	1	0	0	0	4	0	1
10	3	(Australia)	LB	James Meredith	4	0	0	0	0	0	0	0	0	4	0	0
10	12	(Antigua and Barbuda)	RB	Mahlon Romeo	4	0	0	0	0	0	0	0	0	4	0	0
12	20	(Wales)	CF	Steve Morison	3	0	0	0	0	0	0	0	0	3	0	0
12	25	(Scotland)	CB	Murray Wallace	1	0	0	2	0	0	0	0	0	3	0	0
14	1	(Scotland)	GK	Jordan Archer	2	0	0	0	0	0	0	0	0	2	0	0
14	2	(Northern Ireland)	RB	Conor McLaughlin	2	0	0	0	0	0	0	0	0	2	0	0
14	9	(England)	CF	Lee Gregroy	2	0	0	0	0	0	0	0	0	2	0	0
17	8	(England)	CM	Ben Thompson	1	0	0	0	0	0	0	0	0	1	0	0
17	13	(England)	GK	Ben Amos	1	0	0	0	0	0	0	0	0	1	0	0
17	16	(England)	GK	David Martin	1	0	0	0	0	0	0	0	0	1	0	0
17	18	(England)	CM	Ryan Tunnicliffe	1	0	0	0	0	0	0	0	0	1	0	0
17	21	(Turkey)	CM	Jem Karacan	1	0	0	0	0	0	0	0	0	1	0	0
17	22	(Republic of Ireland)	CF	Aiden O'Brien	1	0	0	0	0	0	0	0	0	1	0	0
17	26	(Czech Republic)	LW	Jiří Skalák	1	0	0	0	0	0	0	0	0	1	0	0
Total					78	1	0	2	0	1	0	0	0	80	1	1

== Transfers ==
=== Transfers in ===
Date from	Position	Nationality	Name	From	Fee	Ref.
1 July 2018	CB	(Scotland)	Murray Wallace	Scunthorpe United	Undisclosed	
23 July 2018	WG	(England)	Rob Harvey	Brightlingsea Regent	Undisclosed	
27 July 2018	CB	(Serbia)	Lazar Stojsavljević	Woking	Free transfer	
2 August 2018	LW	(Czech Republic)	Jiří Skalák	Brighton & Hove Albion	£800,000	
17 August 2018	CM	(Turkey)	Jem Karacan	Bolton Wanderers	Free transfer	
1 January 2019	CM	(England)	Ryan Leonard	Sheffield United	£1,500,000	
3 January 2019	CF	(Wales)	Tom Bradshaw	Barnsley	£1,250,000	

=== Transfers out ===
Date from	Position	Nationality	Name	To	Fee	Ref.
1 July 2018	CM	(Comoros)	Jimmy Abdou	(France) FC Martigues	Released	
1 July 2018	CF	(Australia)	Kristian Brymora	(Sweden) Hässleholms	Released	
1 July 2018	SS	(Australia)	Tim Cahill	(India) Jamshedpur	Released	
1 July 2018	LB	(England)	Noah Chesmain	Colchester United	Released	
1 July 2018	GK	(England)	Harry Girling	Free Agent	Released	
1 July 2018	CF	(England)	Noel Leighton	Free Agent	Released	
1 July 2018	CB	(England)	Christian Mbulu	(Scotland) Motherwell	Released	
1 July 2018	CF	(England)	Jamie Philpot	Dartford	Released	
1 July 2018	CF	(England)	Harry Smith	Macclesfield Town	Released	
1 July 2018	LB	(England)	Harry Toffolo	Lincoln City	Released	
1 July 2018	LM	(Canada)	Kris Twardek	(Republic of Ireland) Sligo Rovers	Released	
4 July 2018	GK	(England)	Sam Jackson	(Scotland) Dundee	Free transfer	
1 January 2019	CM	(Northern Ireland)	George Saville	Middlesbrough	£8,000,000	
4 January 2019	CB	(England)	Byron Webster	Scunthorpe United	Free transfer	
15 January 2019	CM	(Turkey)	Jem Karacan	Free agent	Released	

=== Loans in ===
Start date	Position	Nationality	Name	From	End date	Ref.
13 July 2018	GK	(England)	Ben Amos	Bolton Wanderers	31 May 2019	
23 August 2018	CF	(Wales)	Tom Bradshaw	Barnsley	3 January 2019	
31 August 2018	CM	(England)	Ryan Leonard	Sheffield United	1 January 2019	
4 January 2019	CB	(England)	Alex Pearce	Derby County	31 May 2019	
16 January 2019	RM	(England)	Ben Marshall	Norwich City	31 May 2019	

=== Loans out ===
Start date	Position	Nationality	Name	To	End date	Ref.
1 July 2018	GK	(England)	Tom King	AFC Wimbledon	31 May 2019	
20 July 2018	CM	(England)	Harry Donovan	Dagenham & Redbridge	2 January 2019	
2 August 2018	CB	(England)	Sid Nelson	Swindon Town	January 2019	
3 August 2018	RB	(England)	James Brown	(Scotland) Livingston	January 2019	
17 August 2018	CM	(England)	Ben Thompson	Portsmouth	31 May 2019	
30 August 2018	RM	(England)	Fred Onyedinma	Wycombe Wanderers	1 January 2019	
31 August 2018	CM	(Northern Ireland)	George Saville	Middlesbrough	1 January 2019	
17 November 2018	DF	(England)	Dan McNamara	Welling United	17 December 2018	
11 January 2019	MF	(England)	Lewis White	Concord Rangers	8 February 2019	
11 January 2019	MF	(England)	Joe Wicks	Kingstonian	8 February 2019	
17 January 2019	RB	(England)	James Brown	Lincoln City	31 May 2019	
23 January 2019	DF	(England)	Dan McNamara	Dover Athletic	23 March 2019	
29 January 2019	CB	(England)	Sid Nelson	Tranmere Rovers	31 May 2019	
1 March 2019	LW	(England)	Rob Harvey	Brightlingsea Regent	29 March 2019	
1 March 2019	MF	(England)	Joe Wicks	Greenwich Borough	29 March 2019	
26 March 2019	CM	(England)	Harry Donovan	Havant & Waterlooville	31 May 2019	
1 April 2019	RB	(England)	Dan McNamara	Havant & Waterlooville	31 May 2019	
