= Lee Gregory (footballer) =

English footballer (born 1988)

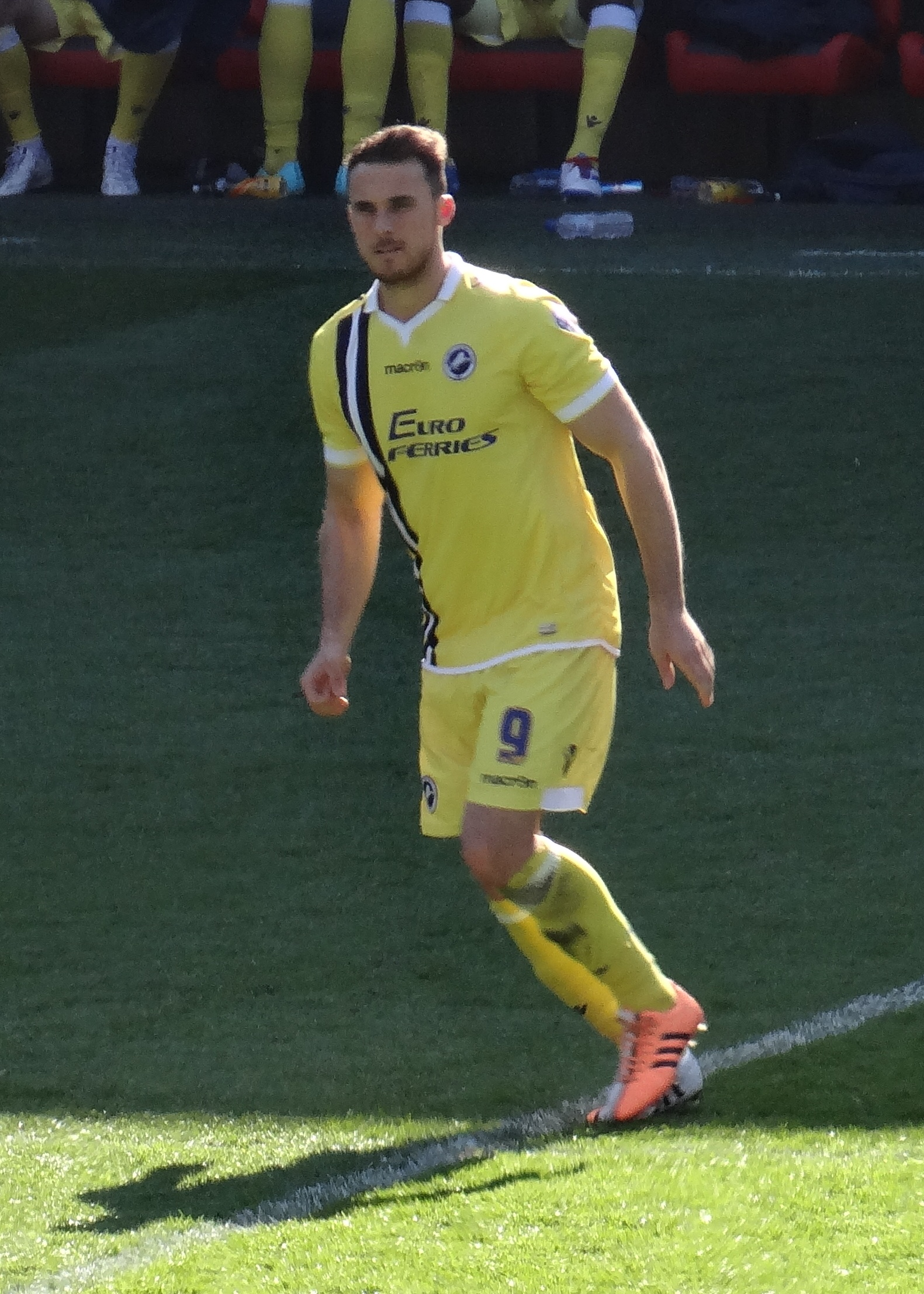
- Gregory playing for Millwall in 2015

Personal information
- Full name: Lee Andrew Gregory
- Date of birth: 26 August 1988 (age 38)
- Place of birth: Sheffield, England
- Height: 6 ft 2 in (1.88 m)
- Position: Striker

Team information
- Current team: Sheffield Wednesday (assistant PDP coach)

Youth career
- 2000–2003: Sheffield United
- 2003–2004: Totley Youth

Senior career*
Years	Team	Apps	(Gls)
2008–2009	Staveley Miners Welfare		
2009–2011	Mansfield Town	2	(1)
2009	→ Glapwell (loan)		
2009	→ Harrogate Town (loan)	9	(0)
2010	→ FC Halifax Town (loan)	10	(5)
2011–2014	FC Halifax Town	129	(82)
2014–2019	Millwall	204	(64)
2019–2021	Stoke City	46	(7)
2021	→ Derby County (loan)	11	(3)
2021–2024	Sheffield Wednesday	86	(27)
2024–2025	Mansfield Town	20	(10)
Total		517	(199)
- * Club domestic league appearances and goals

Lee Andrew Gregory (born 26 August 1988) is an English professional football coach and former player, who is currently the U18 assistant coach at Sheffield Wednesday.

Gregory started playing football at the Sheffield United Academy. He was not offered a professional contract with the Blades and so he went and played non-league football with Staveley Miners Welfare whilst learning to become an electrician. After a prolific season with Staveley he joined Mansfield Town in September 2009. He failed to break into the first team at Field Mill and after loan spells with Glapwell, Harrogate Town and FC Halifax Town he signed for the latter on a permanent basis. He became a regular goalscorer at The Shay helping them win the Northern Premier League Premier Division title in 2010–11 and promotion from the National League North via the play-offs in 2012–13. His goals earned him a move to Championship club Millwall in June 2014. Gregory scored 27 goals in 2015–16 and helped the Lions beat Bradford City in the 2017 EFL League One play-off final. He scored 77 goals in 238 appearances for Millwall before joining Stoke City in June 2019. After two seasons in Staffordshire, Gregory went on to play for Derby County and Sheffield Wednesday before ending his career back at Mansfield Town.

== Playing career ==
=== Early career ===
Born in Sheffield, Gregory played for the Sheffield United Academy and was released in 2003. Following his release from the Blades' academy Gregory, began working as an electrician whilst playing for Northern Counties East League side Staveley Miners Welfare. He scored 37 goals in the 2008–09 season with Staveley which saw him attract interest from higher placed clubs.

In September 2009, he signed with Conference Premier side Mansfield Town, where he was told by manager David Holdsworth that he would be sent out on loan and then come back and stake a claim for the first team. He spent time on loan at Glapwell (where he scored six goals in a single match – a 7–1 rout against Willenhall Town) and Conference North side Harrogate Town. Despite scoring on his Stags debut in a 2–1 win against Southport on 11 September 2010, Gregory was unable to establish himself in Holdsworth's plans.

=== FC Halifax Town ===
In the spring of 2010 Gregory was loaned to FC Halifax Town for the remainder of the season as back-up for the run-in in the eventual Northern Premier League Division One North title winning campaign, Gregory scoring five goals in 10 appearances, mainly coming off the bench. He rejoined Halifax permanently in December 2010, being the club's third top scorer behind Jamie Vardy and Danny Holland as Halifax claimed back-to-back titles and promotions.

Gregory finished the 2011–12 campaign in the Conference North as the club's top scorer with 18 league goals although promotion was missed out after losing to Gainsborough Trinity in the play-offs. He scored a further 20 goals in the 2012–13 campaign as the Shaymen obtained another promotion this time via the play-offs after defeating Guiseley and then Brackley Town. On 30 June 2013 Gregory signed a new two-year deal with Halifax, and finished 2013–14 with 29 league goals under his name, being the division's second top goalscorer, behind only Luton Town's Andre Gray. Halifax finished in 5th position, losing to Cambridge United in the play-offs. During the January transfer window Gregory nearly moved to Crawley Town. At the end of the campaign Gregory was attracting interest from Football League clubs with Championship side Millwall making a number of bids.

=== Millwall ===
On 16 June 2014, Gregory signed a three-year contract with Championship Millwall after the club agreed a fee with Halifax. He scored his first Football League goal on 30 September 2014 in a 3–1 home defeat against Birmingham City. Gregory was a regular in the 2014–15 season as Millwall struggled in the second tier and with relegation an inevitability, manager Ian Holloway was sacked in March 2014 and replaced by Neil Harris. Gregory scored a hat-trick in a 3–3 draw against Derby County on 25 April 2015 but it was in vain as Rotherham United defeated Reading to relegate Millwall to League One. Gregory scored on the opening day of the 2015–16 season, in a 2–1 victory over Shrewsbury Town. He scored four goals against Plymouth Argyle in the EFL Trophy on 10 November 2015. Gregory scored 17 goals in the second half of the campaign bringing his total to 27 which helped the Lions reach the 2016 Football League One play-off final where they were beaten 3–1 by Barnsley.

Gregory signed a contract extension with Millwall in September 2016. Millwall were involved in a tense fight for a play-off place throughout the season, eventually securing their place with a 4–3 final day success over Bristol Rovers, with Gregory scoring twice. Gregory scored in the 3–2 semi-final 2nd leg win over Scunthorpe United and assisted Steve Morison for the only goal against Bradford City in the final. He was sent-off for the first time in his professional career against Queens Park Rangers on 12 September 2017, a decision which angered manager Neil Harris. Gregory scored ten goals in 47 appearances in 2017–18 as Millwall had a fine return to the Championship narrowly missing out on a play-off spot by three points. At the end of campaign, his contract was extended by Millwall for an extra year after the club exercised an option. He played 50 times in the 2018–19 season, scoring 13 goals helping the side finish in 21st position and avoid relegation. Gregory left the Den at the end of the season with him expressing his desire to move back up north.

=== Stoke City ===
On 25 June 2019, Gregory joined Championship side Stoke City. He made his debut on 3 August 2019 in a 2–1 defeat against Queens Park Rangers. He scored his first goal for Stoke in a 3–2 defeat against Nottingham Forest on 27 September 2019. Stoke made a poor start to the 2019–20 season failing to win any of their first ten fixtures and were rooted to the foot of the table by October. Gregory suffered a bizarre injury at the beginning of November after he locked his knee whilst in bed. He recovered quickly and scored a penalty against Barnsley on 9 November 2019 helping new manager Michael O'Neill record a 4–2 victory. He scored in the final two matches of the 2019–20 against Brentford and Nottingham Forest which saw Stoke avoid relegation and finish in 15th position.

On 1 February 2021, Gregory joined Derby County on loan for the remainder of the 2020–21 season. He scored his first goal for Derby in a 2–1 win against Middlesbrough on 13 February 2021. Gregory score two more goals for Derby before he suffered a season ending injury at the start of April.

=== Sheffield Wednesday ===
On 5 August 2021, Gregory joined EFL League One side Sheffield Wednesday. He made his Wednesday debut coming off the bench against Doncaster Rovers on 14 August 2021 and a few days later against Fleetwood Town he scored his first goal for the club. Gregory won the EFL Player of the Month for April 2022. Following promotion back to the EFL Championship an option was taken in Gregory's contact for him to stay at the club.

=== Return to Mansfield Town ===
On 15 May 2024, Mansfield announced Gregory had returned on a one-year deal. He made his debut on 9 August 2024, netting his sides second goal in a 2–1 victory over Barnsley. He was offered a new contract at the end of the 2024–25 season. On 12 September 2025, Gregory announced his retirement from playing football.

== Coaching career ==
=== Sheffield Wednesday ===
In early 2026, Gregory returned to his former club Sheffield Wednesday to help at youth level, which in the summer was turned into a permanent addition to the academy staff as part of the U18 side.

== Career statistics ==
Appearances and goals by club, season and competition
Club	Season	League			FA Cup		League Cup		Other		Total	
Club	Season	Division	Apps	Goals	Apps	Goals	Apps	Goals	Apps	Goals	Apps	Goals
Mansfield Town	2009–10	Conference Premier	0	0	—		—		—		0	0
Mansfield Town	2010–11	Conference Premier	2	1	1	0	—		—		3	1
Mansfield Town	Total		2	1	1	0	—		—		3	1
Harrogate Town (loan)	2009–10	Conference North	9	0	—		—		—		9	0
FC Halifax Town	2010–11	NPL Premier Division	24	15	—		—		1 (Note: Appearance in Northern Premier League Challenge Cup)	1	25	16
FC Halifax Town	2011–12	Conference North	32	18	4	1	—		4 (Note: Two appearances in FA Trophy, two appearances and two goals in Conference North play-offs)	2	40	21
FC Halifax Town	2012–13	Conference North	37	20	5	2	—		8 (Note: Five appearances and two goals in FA Trophy, three appearances and two goals in Conference North play-offs)	4	50	26
FC Halifax Town	2013–14	Conference Premier	36	29	2	2	—		2 (Note: Appearances in Conference Premier play-offs)	1	40	32
FC Halifax Town	Total		129	82	11	5	—		15	8	155	95
Millwall	2014–15	Championship	39	9	1	0	1	0	—		41	9
Millwall	2015–16	League One	41	18	2	1	1	0	9 (Note: Six appearances and six goals in Football League Trophy, three appearances and two goals in League One play-offs)	8	53	27
Millwall	2016–17	League One	37	17	6	0	0	0	4 (Note: One appearance in EFL Trophy, three appearances and one goal in League One play-offs)	1	47	18
Millwall	2017–18	Championship	43	10	3	0	1	0	—		47	10
Millwall	2018–19	Championship	44	10	3	1	3	2	—		50	13
Millwall	Total		204	64	15	2	6	2	13	9	238	77
Stoke City	2019–20	Championship	40	6	1	0	0	0	—		41	6
Stoke City	2020–21	Championship	6	1	0	0	3	0	—		9	1
Stoke City	Total		46	7	1	0	3	0	—		50	7
Derby County (loan)	2020–21	Championship	11	3	0	0	0	0	—		11	3
Sheffield Wednesday	2021–22	League One	36	16	1	0	0	0	2 (Note: Appearances in League One Play-offs)	1	39	17
Sheffield Wednesday	2022–23	League One	38	10	3	0	2	0	4 (Note: One appearance in EFL Trophy, three appearances and one goal in League One play-offs)	1	47	11
Sheffield Wednesday	2023–24	Championship	12	1	0	0	2	0	—		14	1
Sheffield Wednesday	Total		86	27	4	0	4	0	6	2	100	29
Mansfield Town	2024–25	League One	20	10	1	0	1	0	1 (Note: One appearance in EFL Trophy)	0	23	10
Career total			506	194	33	7	14	2	35	19	588	222

== Honours ==
Millwall

- EFL League One play-offs: 2017

Sheffield Wednesday

- EFL League One play-offs: 2023

Individual

- Conference Premier Team of the Year: 2013–14
- EFL League One Player of the Month: April 2022
