= Alfie Pavey =

English footballer (born 1995)

Personal information
- Full name: Alfie Martin Kevin Pavey
- Date of birth: 2 October 1995 (age 31)
- Place of birth: Southwark, England
- Height: 1.86 m (6 ft 1 in)
- Position: Forward

Team information
- Current team: Tonbridge Angels
- Number: 12

Youth career
- –2013: Maidstone United
- 2013–2014: Millwall

Senior career*
Years	Team	Apps	(Gls)
2014–2017	Millwall	6	(0)
2014	→ Barnet (loan)	3	(0)
2016	→ Aldershot Town (loan)	15	(2)
2016	→ Bromley (loan)	7	(0)
2017	→ Hampton & Richmond Borough (loan)	6	(2)
2017	→ Dartford (loan)	8	(2)
2017	Welling United	2	(0)
2017–2018	Dartford	38	(22)
2018	Havant & Waterlooville	19	(4)
2018–2019	Dover Athletic	33	(9)
2019–2021	Barnet	18	(0)
2020	→ Dartford (loan)	4	(0)
2021–2022	Maidstone United	14	(2)
2021–2022	→ Dover Athletic (loan)	18	(6)
2022–2023	Dover Athletic	27	(8)
2023	Braintree Town	15	(3)
2023	Farnborough	10	(8)
2023–2024	Woking	16	(0)
2024	→ Braintree Town (loan)	6	(1)
2024–2025	Eastbourne Borough	34	(6)
2025	→ Farnborough (loan)	7	(1)
2025–2026	Bracknell Town	11	(3)
2025–2026	→ Tonbridge Angels (loan)	32	(3)
2026–	Tonbridge Angels	3	(0)

International career^{‡}
2018	England C	1	(1)
- * Club domestic league appearances and goals as of 19:56, 27 August 2026 (UTC) ‡ National team caps and goals as of 17:15, 13 February 2022 (UTC)

Alfie Martin Kevin Pavey (born 2 October 1995) is an English footballer who plays as a forward for Tonbridge Angels.

== Career ==
On 18 December 2012, he was called up for the first time by Maidstone United, remaining an unused substitute in their 1–2 defeat away to FC Halifax Town in the FA Trophy second round at The Shay.

In Maidstone's youth ranks, Pavey scored over 300 goals in three years, including 124 in his final season before on 22 May 2013 joining Millwall on a two-year academy scholarship. He was included in the squad for one match in that Championship campaign, called up by interim manager Neil Harris for their 1–3 home defeat to Leicester City at The New Den on 1 January 2014.

On 26 September 2014, Pavey joined Conference leaders Barnet on a month-long loan, saying "It should be a great experience for me playing against bigger, stronger players and working on my hold-up play". The following day, he made his senior debut in their 2–1 win over Forest Green Rovers at The New Lawn, replacing Sam Hoskins for the final eleven minutes and earning a yellow card for a foul on David Pipe. He made two further appearances for Barnet, both again as a substitute.

Millwall ended the 2014–15 Championship season with relegation to League One. Pavey was included in their squad for the final game of the season, away to Wolverhampton Wanderers at the Molineux Stadium. He made his professional debut in the 2–4 defeat, coming on in the final minute for fellow debutant Jamie Philpot, who himself had come on as a substitute ten minutes earlier and scored.

On 8 January 2016, Pavey returned to the National League, joining Aldershot Town on a 28-day loan. The following day, he made his first career start and scored his first senior goal in a 3–1 home win over Chester. After two goals in 12 games, including seven starts, his loan was extended for the remainder of the season.

On 16 August, Pavey returned to the National League, this time on a three-month loan with Bromley. He made his debut on the same day, in a 2–2 draw with former club Aldershot Town.

On 9 March 2017, Pavey joined National League South side Dartford on a youth loan for a 28-day period. He scored his first goal for the club in his second match on 21 March 2017 in a 4–0 victory over Margate. During his time on loan he made eight league appearances - scoring two goals - and one play-off semi-final appearance.

At the end of the 2016/17 season, Pavey was released by Millwall. On 15 June 2017 he joined Welling United.

He played two games for Welling United - without scoring - before returning to Dartford on 14 August 2017.

On 29 April 2018, Pavey was awarded the National League South Player of the Season award.

On 25 November 2018, Pavey signed for Dover Athletic. After 11 goals in 37 games, Pavey joined Barnet.

On 17 November 2020, Pavey rejoined Dartford on an initial two-month loan. On 2 January 2021, Pavey was recalled early from his loan by Barnet. He left the Bees at the end of the 2020-21 season.

Pavey re-joined Maidstone for the 2021-22 season. On 26 November 2021, Pavey returned to Dover Athletic on loan for a month. On 27 December, this loan was extended until the end of January 2022. Having scored four goals in ten appearances, including the winner over Eastleigh for Dover's first victory of the season, Pavey had his loan extended by another month on 31 January and then again for another month on 1 March. Pavey was recalled on 28 March after scoring six goals in his second spell at the club. On 11 June 2022, Pavey rejoined Dover Athletic on a permanent basis following his release from Maidstone. He was transfer listed in January 2023, joining Braintree Town on 2 February.

On 29 May 2023, he agreed to join fellow National League South side, Farnborough ahead of the 2023–24 campaign.

After 8 goals in his first 10 league games with Farnborough, Pavey agreed to return to the National League to join Woking on a two-year deal for an undisclosed fee. On 11 January 2024, he returned to Braintree Town on loan for the remainder of the campaign. On 8 March 2024, he was recalled by Woking following an injury to Lewis Walker, returning to the club with one goal in six games at Braintree.

On 24 May 2024, Pavey reached a mutual agreement with Woking to terminate his contract. On the same day, it was announced that Pavey had agreed to join National League South club Eastbourne Borough ahead of the 2024–25 season.

In May 2025, Pavey joined Southern League Premier Division South side Bracknell Town. In October 2025, he joined National League South club Tonbridge Angels on loan for the remainder of the season.

== Career statistics ==
As of match played 25 April 2026

Appearances and goals by club, season and competition
Club	Season	League			FA Cup		EFL Cup		Other		Total	
Club	Season	Division	Apps	Goals	Apps	Goals	Apps	Goals	Apps	Goals	Apps	Goals
Millwall	2014–15	Championship	1	0	0	0	0	0	—		1	0
Millwall	2015–16	League One	4	0	2	0	0	0	0	0	6	0
Millwall	2016–17	League One	1	0	0	0	0	0	0	0	1	0
Millwall	Total		6	0	2	0	0	0	0	0	8	0
Barnet (loan)	2014–15	Conference Premier	3	0	0	0	—		0	0	3	0
Aldershot Town (loan)	2015–16	National League	15	2	—		—		—		15	2
Bromley (loan)	2016–17	National League	7	0	0	0	—		0	0	7	0
Hampton & Richmond Borough (loan)	2016–17	National League South	6	2	—		—		—		6	2
Dartford (loan)	2016–17	National League South	8	2	—		—		1 (Note: Appearance(s) in the National League South play-offs)	0	9	2
Welling United	2017–18	National League South	2	0	—		—		—		2	0
Dartford	2017–18	National League South	38	22	4	4	—		4 (Note: Three appearances in the FA Trophy, one appearance in National League South play-offs)	0	46	26
Havant & Waterlooville	2018–19	National League	19	4	1	0	—		—		20	4
Dover Athletic	2018–19	National League	23	6	—		—		3 (Note: Appearance(s) in the FA Trophy)	2	26	8
Dover Athletic	2019–20	National League	10	3	—		—		0	0	10	3
Dover Athletic	Total		33	9	—		—		3	2	36	11
Barnet	2019–20	National League	8	0	1	0	—		2 (Note: Appearance(s) in the National League play-offs)	0	11	0
Barnet	2020–21	National League	10	0	1	0	—		0	0	11	0
Barnet	Total		18	0	2	0	—		2	0	22	0
Dartford (loan)	2020–21	National League South	4	0	—		—		0	0	4	0
Maidstone United	2021–22	National League South	14	2	2	0	—		0	0	16	2
Dover Athletic (loan)	2021–22	National League	18	6	—		—		—		18	6
Dover Athletic	2022–23	National League South	27	8	1	0	—		1	1	29	9
Braintree Town	2022–23	National League South	15	3	—		—		1	0	16	3
Farnborough	2023–24	National League South	10	8	2	0	—		0	0	12	8
Woking	2023–24	National League	16	0	—		—		0	0	16	0
Braintree Town (loan)	2023–24	National League South	6	1	—		—		—		6	1
Eastbourne Borough	2024–25	National League South	34	6	1	0	—		5 (Note: One appearance and one goal in National League South play-offs, two appearances in the FA Trophy, two appearances and two goals in Sussex Senior Cup)	3	40	9
Farnborough (loan)	2024–25	National League South	7	1	—		—		0	0	7	1
Bracknell Town	2025–26	SFL Premier Division South	11	3	5	2	—		1	1	17	6
Tonbridge Angels (loan)	2025–26	National League South	32	3	—		—		0	0	32	3
Career total			349	82	20	6	0	0	18	7	387	95

== Honours ==
Maidstone United

- National League South: 2021–22
