= 2014–15 Millwall F.C. season =

Millwall
2014–15 season
- Chairman: John Berylson
- Manager: Ian Holloway (until 10 March); Neil Harris (from 29 April)
- Football League Championship: 22nd (Relegated)
- FA Cup: Third round (eliminated by Bradford City)
- League Cup: Second round (eliminated by Southampton)
- Top goalscorer: League: Lee Gregory (9); All: Lee Gregory (9)
- Highest home attendance: 16,205 versus Leeds United (9 August 2014)
Home colours	Away colours

The 2014–15 Football League Championship was the 130th season in the history of Millwall Football Club. It was their 89th season in the Football League and 40th in the second tier of English football. It was Millwall's fifth continuous season in the Championship, after promotion from the Football League One in 2010.

== Statistics ==
=== Appearances & goals ===
No.	Pos	Nat	Player	Total		Championship		FA Cup		League Cup	
No.	Pos	Nat	Player	Apps	Goals	Apps	Goals	Apps	Goals	Apps	Goals
1	GK	(Republic of Ireland) IRL	David Forde	50	0	46+0	0	2+0	0	2+0	0
2	DF	(Republic of Ireland) IRL	Alan Dunne	42	2	35+4	2	2+0	0	1+0	0
3	DF	(Nigeria) NGR	Danny Shittu	11	1	7+1	1	2+0	0	1+0	0
4	MF	(England) ENG	Josh Wright	2	0	1+0	0	0+0	0	1+0	0
4	DF	(England) ENG	Shaun Cummings	12	0	12+0	0	0+0	0	0+0	0
5	DF	(Netherlands) NED	Jos Hooiveld	15	1	15+0	1	0+0	0	0+0	0
6	MF	(Republic of Ireland) IRL	Shaun Williams	39	2	38+0	2	0+0	0	1+0	0
7	MF	(England) ENG	Lee Martin	29	1	22+5	1	2+0	0	0+0	0
8	FW	(Italy) ITA	Diego Fabbrini	13	1	11+1	1	0+0	0	1+0	0
8	FW	(Wales) WAL	Jermaine Easter	11	1	2+7	1	0+0	0	2+0	0
9	FW	(England) ENG	Lee Gregory	41	9	28+11	9	1+0	0	1+0	0
10	MF	(England) ENG	Nicky Bailey	8	0	5+3	0	0+0	0	0+0	0
11	MF	(England) ENG	Martyn Woolford	40	3	33+5	3	0+2	0	0+0	0
12	FW	(England) ENG	Paris Cowan-Hall	5	0	0+5	0	0+0	0	0+0	0
13	GK	(England) ENG	Denzal Gerrar	0	0	0+0	0	0+0	0	0+0	0
14	DF	(England) ENG	Matthew Briggs	12	1	7+1	0	2+0	0	2+0	1
15	MF	(England) ENG	Ed Upson	28	2	15+11	2	2+0	0	0+0	0
16	DF	(England) ENG	Mark Beevers	26	2	24+1	2	1+0	0	0+0	0
17	DF	(England) ENG	Byron Webster	14	0	9+2	0	0+1	0	2+0	0
18	FW	(Senegal) SEN	Magaye Gueye	36	5	9+23	5	0+2	0	2+0	0
19	FW	(Jamaica) JAM	Ricardo Fuller	40	6	16+22	4	2+0	2	0+0	0
20	MF	(Nigeria) NGR	Fred Onyedinma	4	0	1+1	0	0+0	0	0+2	0
21	FW	(Sweden) SWE	Mathias Ranégie	7	0	3+4	0	0+0	0	0+0	0
21	DF	(England) ENG	Dan Harding	20	0	20+0	0	0+0	0	0+0	0
22	FW	(Republic of Ireland) IRL	Aiden O'Brien	20	2	13+6	2	0+0	0	0+1	0
23	MF	(England) ENG	Jack Powell	7	0	5+0	0	0+0	0	1+1	0
24	DF	(England) ENG	Jake Goodman	0	0	0+0	0	0+0	0	0+0	0
25	DF	(Trinidad and Tobago) TTO	Justin Hoyte	3	0	1+1	0	0+0	0	1+0	0
26	MF	(Comoros) COM	Nadjim Abdou	37	1	29+4	1	2+0	0	2+0	0
27	GK	(England) ENG	Jordan Archer	1	0	0+0	0	0+0	0	1+0	0
27	FW	(Australia) AUS	Scott McDonald	26	3	23+1	2	1+0	1	1+0	0
28	DF	(England) ENG	Scott Malone	20	1	17+3	1	0+0	0	0+0	0
28	MF	(England) ENG	Michael Tonge	6	0	5+1	0	0+0	0	0+0	0
29	DF	(England) ENG	Andy Wilkinson	9	0	9+0	0	0+0	0	0+0	0
29	FW	(England) ENG	Gary Taylor-Fletcher	10	0	6+4	0	0+0	0	0+0	0
30	MF	(England) ENG	Richard Chaplow	10	0	6+1	0	2+0	0	1+0	0
31	MF	(Spain) ESP	Ángel Martínez	4	0	4+0	0	0+0	0	0+0	0
32	FW	(England) ENG	John Marquis	2	0	1+0	0	0+0	0	1+0	0
34	MF	(England) ENG	Ben Thompson	1	0	0+0	0	0+0	0	0+1	0
35	DF	(England) ENG	Sid Nelson	15	0	14+0	0	1+0	0	0+0	0
37	DF	(England) ENG	Josh Siafa	1	0	0+0	0	0+0	0	0+1	0
39	FW	(England) ENG	Alfie Pavey	1	0	0+1	0	0+0	0	0+0	0
42	FW	(Austria) AUT	Stefan Maierhofer	10	1	6+4	1	0+0	0	0+0	0
43	GK	(England) ENG	Stephen Bywater	0	0	0+0	0	0+0	0	0+0	0
44	DF	(Trinidad and Tobago) TTO	Carlos Edwards	8	0	8+0	0	0+0	0	0+0	0
45	FW	(England) ENG	Jamie Philpot	1	1	0+1	1	0+0	0	0+0	0

== Match details ==
=== Pre-season and friendlies ===
15 July 2014	Dartford	0–1	Millwall	Princes Park
19:45 BST		Report	Easter 62'	Attendance: 2,441

19 July 2014	Stevenage	2–2	Millwall	Broadhall Way
15:00 BST	Walton 49', 55'	Report	Bailey 10'; Easter 65' (pen.)

1 August 2014	Millwall	1–0	(Spain) Mallorca	The Den
19:45 BST	Easter 30'	Report		Attendance: 3,817; Referee: Carl Berry

=== Football League Championship ===
==== August ====
9 August 2014 1	Millwall	2–0	Leeds United	The Den, South Bermondsey
15:00	Beevers 8'; Williams 88' (pen.)	Report		Attendance: 16,205; Referee: Oliver Langford

16 August 2014 2	Fulham	0–1	Millwall	Craven Cottage, Fulham
15:00		Report	Woolford 12'	Attendance: 18,988; Referee: Lee Mason

19 August 2014 3	Sheffield Wednesday	1–1	Millwall	Hillsborough, Sheffield
19:45	Chris Maguire 57'; Keiren Westwood (yellow card) 84'; Glenn Loovens (yellow card) 90+2'		Shaun Williams (penalty missed); Ricardo Fuller (yellow card) 90+2'; Magaye Gueye 90+5'	Referee: Nigel Miller

23 August 2014 4	Millwall	0–1	Rotherham United	The Den, South Bermondsey
15:00		Report	Pringle 49'	Attendance: 10,282 (410 away); Referee: Paul Tierney

30 August 2014 5	Millwall	2–1	Blackpool	The Den, South Bermondsey
15:00	McDonald 33'; Malone 51'	Report	Ranger 71'	Attendance: 9,877; Referee: Andy Woolmer

==== September ====
13 September 2014 6	Ipswich Town	2–0	Millwall	Portman Road, Ipswich
15:00	McGoldrick 45+2'; Murphy 63'	Report		Attendance: 16,190 (1,329 away); Referee: Carl Berry

16 September 2014 7	Reading	3–2	Millwall	Madejski Stadium, Reading
20:00	Cox 6', 84'; Blackman 15' (pen.)	Report	Fuller 39'; Beevers 54'	Attendance: 15,091 (871 away); Referee: Keith Hill

20 September 2014 8	Millwall	0–0	Nottingham Forest	The Den, South Bermondsey
15:00		Report		Attendance: 12,038 (1,676 away); Referee: Graham Scott

27 September 2014 9	Huddersfield Town	2–1	Millwall	John Smith's Stadium, Huddersfield
15:00	Wells (yellow card) 23' (goal) 37', 57' (pen.); Smith (yellow card) 54'	Report	Upson 41'; Bailey (yellow card) 56'; Beevers (yellow card) 69'; Ranégie (yellow card) 79'; Dunne (yellow card) 82'; Williams (yellow card) 90'	Attendance: 11,712; Referee: Carl Boyeson

30 September 2014 10	Millwall	1–3	Birmingham City	The Den, South Bermondsey
19:45	Gregory 54'; McDonald (yellow card) 88'	Report	Gleeson (yellow card) 27'; Donaldson 32'; Cotterill 40' (yellow card) 49'; Arthur (yellow card) 57'; Thomas 84'	Attendance: 9,086; Referee: Roger East

==== October ====
4 October 2014 11	Derby County	0–0	Millwall	Pride Park, Derby
15:00	Ibe (yellow card) 30'; Martin (yellow card) 30'; Eustace (yellow card) 38'; Whitbread (yellow card) 80'	Report	Webster (yellow card) 18'; Forde (yellow card) 30'; Woolford (yellow card) 33'; Dunne (yellow card) 69'	Attendance: 27,749; Referee: Mark Haywood

18 October 2014 12	Millwall	3–3	Wolverhampton Wanderers	The Den, South Bermondsey
15:00	Briggs (yellow card) 64'; Gregory 67'; Fuller 82', 87'; Williams (red card) 90+8'	Report	Batth 23' (yellow card) 70'; Dicko (yellow card) 35'; Henry (yellow card) 55'; Ebanks-Landell 61' (yellow card) 68'; Sako 64'; McDonald (yellow card) 88'; Evans (yellow card) 90+5'	Attendance: 13,428; Referee: Darren Drysdale

21 October 2014 13	Wigan Athletic	0–0	Millwall	DW Stadium, Wigan
19:45		Report	Dunne (yellow card) 73'; Wilkinson (yellow card) 82'; McDonald (yellow card) 85'	Attendance: 10,201; Referee: Eddie Ilderton

25 October 2014 14	Millwall	1–0	Cardiff City	The Den, South Bermondsey, London
12:15	Beevers (yellow card) 10'; Shittu 54'; McDonald (yellow card) 90+2'	Report		Attendance: 10,135; Referee: Scott Duncan

==== November ====
1 November 2014 15	Watford	3–1	Millwall	Vicarage Road, Watford
15:00	Vydra 36'; Tőzsér 45+4'; Hoban (yellow card) 62'; Munari 64'	Report	Woolford 12'; Forde (yellow card) 22'; Briggs (yellow card) 35'; Fuller (yellow card) 41'; Dunne (yellow card) 45+3'; Williams (yellow card) 90+4'	Attendance: 17,000; Referee: Bobby Madley

4 November 2014 16	Millwall	2–2	Blackburn Rovers	The Den, South Bermondsey
19:45	Wilkinson (red card) 61'; Martin 72'; Fuller (yellow card) 72'; Williams (yellow card) 88' (goal) 88'	Report	Duffy 37'; Gestede 65'; Olsson (yellow card) 83'	Attendance: 8,250; Referee: Darren Deadman

8 November 2014 17	Millwall	2–3	Brentford	The Den, South Bermondsey
15:00	Dunne (yellow card) 2' (goal) 59'; Martin (yellow card) 31'; Gregory 58'; Briggs (yellow card) 79'	Report	Bidwell (yellow card) 37'; Gray 42', 56' (yellow card) 62'; Shittu 64' (o.g.)	Attendance: 13,048; Referee: James Adcock

22 November 2014 18	Charlton Athletic	0–0	Millwall	The Valley, Charlton
15:00	Bikey-Amougou (yellow card) 74'	Report	Gregory (yellow card) 45+2'; Beevers (yellow card) 90+4'	Attendance: 19,189; Referee: Graham Scott

29 November 2014 19	Bournemouth	2–2	Millwall	Dean Court, Bournemouth
15:00	Cook 22'; Pitman 25'; Pugh (yellow card) 57'	Report	Upson (yellow card) 37' (goal) 75'; Woolford (yellow card) 39'; Webster (yellow card) 84'; Gueye 88'	Attendance: 10,016; Referee: Andy Davies

==== December ====
6 December 2014 20	Millwall	1–5	Middlesbrough	The Den, South Bermondsey
15:00	McDonald (yellow card) 52' (goal) 78'	Report	Vossen 21', 34', 44'; Bamford 28'; Kike 79'	Attendance: 10,328; Referee: Mick Russell

12 December 2014 21	Brighton & Hove Albion	0–1	Millwall	Falmer Stadium, Brighton
19:45		Report	Gregory 15'	Attendance: 24,085; Referee: James Linington

19 December 2014 22	Millwall	0–1	Bolton Wanderers	The Den, South Bermondsey
19:45	Dunne (yellow card) 38'; Shittu (yellow card) 54'	Report	Danns (yellow card) 22'; Pratley 68' (yellow card) 90'; Mills (yellow card) 82'	Attendance: 8,635; Referee: Stuart Attwell

26 December 2014 23	Norwich City	6–1	Millwall	Carrow Road, Norwich
15:00 GMT	Whittaker 13'; Jerome 18'; Johnson 54', 61'; Hooper 69', 90+1'	Report	Beevers (yellow card) 73'; Easter 86'	Attendance: 26,714; Referee: Andy D'Urso

28 December 2014 24	Millwall	0–2	Bournemouth	The Den, South Bermondsey
15:00 GMT	Shittu (yellow card) 13'; Forde (yellow card) 35'; Wilkinson (yellow card) 45+2'; McDonald (yellow card) 62'; Williams (red card) 80'	Report	Kermorgant 32' (pen.); Surman (yellow card) 34'; Arter 42'; Smith (yellow card) 52'; Wilson (yellow card) 80'	Attendance: 10,407; Referee: David Coote

==== January ====
10 January 2015 25	Blackpool	1–0	Millwall	Bloomfield Road, Blackpool
15:00 GMT	Clarke 33'; Oliver (yellow card) 36'	Report		Attendance: 9,994; Referee: Steve Martin

17 January 2015 26	Millwall	1–3	Ipswich Town	The Den, South Bermondsey
15:00	Gueye 43'	Report	Hunt 5', 14'; Parr 77'	Attendance: 11,063; Referee: Graham Salisbury

27 January 2015 27	Millwall	0–0	Reading	The Den, South Bermondsey
19:45	Nelson (red card) 45'	Report	Mackie (yellow card) 85'	Attendance: 8,317; Referee: Andy Madley

31 January 2015 28	Nottingham Forest	0–1	Millwall	City Ground, Nottingham
15:00	Antonio (yellow card) 32'; Tesche (yellow card) 53'	Report	Upson (yellow card) 34'; Williams (yellow card) 81'; Fuller 83'	Attendance: 23,018; Referee: Mark Heywood

==== February ====
7 February 2015 29	Millwall	1–3	Huddersfield Town	The Den, South Bermondsey
15:00	Upson (yellow card) 22'; Forde (yellow card) 23'; Maierhofer 28'; Williams (yellow card) 30'	Report	Scannell 17'; Butterfield (yellow card) 23' (goal) 74'; Wells (yellow card) 31' (yellow-red card) 51'; Wallace (yellow card) 55'; Edgar (yellow card) 56'; Vaughan 86' (pen.)	Attendance: 10,281; Referee: Mike Jones

10 February 2015 30	Birmingham City	0–1	Millwall	St Andrew's, Birmingham
19:45	Spector (yellow card) 90+4'	Report	Dunne 51'; Martin (yellow card) 53'; Williams (yellow card) 53'; Cummings (yellow card) 90+2'	Attendance: 14,186; Referee: Simon Hooper

14 February 2015 31	Leeds United	1–0	Millwall	Elland Road, Leeds
15:00	Mowatt 39' (yellow card) 76'; Austin (yellow card) 45'; Cook (yellow card) 84'	Report	Maierhofer (yellow card) 35'; Martínez (yellow card) 48'	Attendance: 24,000; Referee: Paul Tierney

21 February 2015 32	Millwall	0–0	Fulham	The Den, South Bermondsey
15:00 GMT	Abdou (yellow card) 72'	Report		Attendance: 12,707; Referee: Keith Hill

24 February 2015 33	Millwall	1–3	Sheffield Wednesday	The Den, South Bermondsey
19:45 GMT	Fabbrini 90+3'	Report	Zayatte (yellow card) 18'; McGugan 52'; Nuhiu 72'; May 83'; Dielna (yellow card) 90+4'	Attendance: 8,568; Referee: James Linington

28 February 2015 34	Rotherham United	2–1	Millwall	New York Stadium, Rotherham
15:00 GMT	Ward 47'; Árnason 85'; Pringle (yellow card) 90+3'	Report	Woolford 20'; Abdou (yellow card) 70'	Attendance: 10,329; Referee: Gary Sutton

==== March ====
3 March 2015 35	Middlesbrough	3–0	Millwall	Riverside Stadium, Middlesbrough
19:45	Bamford 26'; Kike 30'; Vossen 78'	Report	Abdou (yellow card) 72'	Attendance: 16,078; Referee: Kevin Wright

7 March 2015 36	Millwall	1–4	Norwich City	Millwall
15:00 GMT	Tonge (yellow card) 62'; Gregory 82' (pen.)	Report	Cuéllar (yellow card) 22'; Howson 38', 60'; Hooper 45' (pen.); Hoolahan 57'	Stadium: The New Den; Attendance: 11,116; Referee: Keith Stroud

14 March 2015 37	Bolton Wanderers	2–0	Millwall	Bolton
15:00 GMT	Le Fondre 10', 45'; Danns (yellow card) 32'	Report	Dunne (yellow card) 90'	Stadium: Macron Stadium; Attendance: 14,719; Referee: Andy Haines

17 March 2015 38	Millwall	0–0	Brighton & Hove Albion	Bermondsey
19:45 GMT	Woolford (yellow card) 42'; Taylor-Fletcher (yellow card) 59'	Report		Stadium: The New Den; Attendance: 9,105; Referee: Andy Woolmer

21 March 2015 39	Brentford	2–2	Millwall	Brentford
13:00 GMT	Smith (yellow card) 73'; Bidwell (yellow card) 76'; Pritchard 85' (pen.); Odubajo 90'	Report	Woolford (yellow card) 12'; Nelson (yellow card) 27'; Gregory 28' (yellow card) 39'; Upson (yellow card) 45'; O'Brien 64'	Stadium: Griffin Park; Attendance: 10,179; Referee: Fred Graham & Gavin Ward

==== April ====
3 April 2015 40	Millwall	2–1	Charlton Athletic	Bermondsey
15:00 GMT	Gueye 79'; Hooiveld 87'	Report	Solly (red card) 28'; Diarra 67'	Stadium: The Den; Attendance: 14,722; Referee: Mick Russell

11 April 2015 41	Millwall	0–2	Watford	Bermondsey, London
15:00	Harding (yellow card) 54'; Nelson (yellow card) 76'; Beevers (yellow card) 79'	Report	Vydra 26'; Guedioura 56'	Stadium: The Den; Attendance: 12,075; Referee: Simon Hooper

14 April 2015 42	Millwall	2–0	Wigan Athletic	Bermondsey
19:45	Gregory (yellow card) 29'; Martin (yellow card) 53'; Bailey (yellow card) 63'; Beevers (yellow card) 63'; Abdou 74'; Upson (red card) 78'; Gueye 90+2'	Report	Bong (yellow card) 29'; Waghorn (red card) 60'; Bo-Kyung (yellow card) 63'; Pearce (red card) 78'	Stadium: The Den; Attendance: 8,494; Referee: Steve Martin

18 April 2015 43	Cardiff City	0–0	Millwall	Cardiff
15:00 BST	Peltier (yellow card) 39'; Doyle (yellow card) 76'	Report	(yellow card) 38' Gregory	Stadium: Cardiff City Stadium; Attendance: 19,639; Referee: Mark Brown

21 April 2015 44	Blackburn Rovers	2–0	Millwall	Blackburn
19:45 GMT	Gestede 78'; Rhodes 90'	Report	Cowan-Hall (yellow card) 73'	Stadium: Ewood Park; Attendance: 12,884; Referee: Nigel Miller

25 April 2015 45	Millwall	3–3	Derby County	Bermondsey
15:00 GMT	Gregory 26', 36' (pen.), 50' (pen.)	Report	Ince 42'; Martin 70' (pen.); Hendrick 85'	Stadium: The Den; Attendance: 12,571; Referee: David Coote

==== May ====
2 May 2015 46	Wolverhampton Wanderers	4–2	Millwall	Wolverhampton
12:15 BST	Dicko 20', 56'; Ebanks-Landell 70'; Sako 90+1'	Report	O'Brien 58'; Philpot 82'	Stadium: Molineux; Attendance: 24,480; Referee: Mark Haywood

=== FA Cup ===
3 January 2015 Third round	Millwall	3–3	Bradford City	The Den, South Bermondsey
15:00	Upson (yellow card) 23'; McDonald 36'; Chaplow (yellow card) 51'; Fuller 66', 83'	Report	Knott 6', 76'; McArdle (yellow card) 54'; Nelson 70' (o.g.)	Attendance: 5,470; Referee: David Webb

14 January 2015 Replay	Bradford City	4–0	Millwall	Valley Parade, Bradford
19:45	Hanson 8'; Davies (yellow card) 10'; Stead 17'; Halliday (yellow card) 21' (goal) 39'; Knott (yellow card) 28' (goal) 57'	Report	Beevers (red card) 6'; Chaplow (yellow card) 17'; Dunne (yellow card) 28'; Forde (yellow card) 28'; Abdou (yellow card) 70'	Attendance: 11,859; Referee: James Adcock

=== Football League Cup ===
12 August 2014 1st round	Millwall	1–0	Wycombe Wanderers	The Den, South Bermondsey
19:45	Matthew Briggs 27' (yellow card) 28' (yellow-red card) 59'		Paris Cowan-Hall (yellow card) 87'	Attendance: 3,403; Referee: Andy D'Urso

26 August 2014 2nd round	Millwall	0–2	Southampton	The Den, South Bermondsey
19:45		Report	Cork 53'; Pellè 90+3'	Attendance: 6,014 (1,011 away); Referee: Dean Whitestone

== Sky Bet Championship ==
=== League table ===
Pos	Team	Pld	W	D	L	GF	GA	GD	Pts	Promotion, qualification or relegation
20	Brighton & Hove Albion	46	10	17	19	44	54	−10	47	
21	Rotherham United	46	11	16	19	46	67	−21	46 (Note: Rotherham United were deducted three points for fielding an ineligible player.)	
22	Millwall (R)	46	9	14	23	42	76	−34	41	Relegation to Football League One
23	Wigan Athletic (R)	46	9	12	25	39	64	−25	39	Relegation to Football League One
24	Blackpool (R)	46	4	14	28	36	91	−55	26	Relegation to Football League One

Updated to match(es) played on 2 May 2015. Source: Sky Sports
Rules for classification: 1) Points; 2) Goal difference; 3) Number of goals scored
(R) Relegated

== Transfers ==
=== In ===
No.	Pos.	Nat.	Name	Age	EU	Moving from	Type	Transfer window	Ends	Transfer fee	Source
44	MF	(Trinidad and Tobago)	Carlos Edwards	35	EU	Ipswich Town	Free transfer	Summer	2015	Free	
9	FW	(England)	Lee Gregory	25	EU	F.C. Halifax Town	Transfer	Summer	2017	Undisclosed	
17	DF	(England)	Byron Webster	27	EU	Yeovil Town	Free transfer	Summer	2016	Free	
19	FW	(Jamaica)	Ricardo Fuller	34	EU	Blackpool	Free transfer	Summer	2015	Free	
18	MF	(Senegal)	Magaye Gueye	24	EU	Everton	Free transfer	Summer	2015	Free	
14	DF	(England)	Matthew Briggs	23	EU	Fulham	Free transfer	Summer	2015	Free	
31	MF	(Spain)	Ángel Martínez	28	EU	Blackpool	Free transfer	Summer	2015	Free	
—	MF	(England)	Paris Cowan-Hall	24	EU	Wycombe Wanderers	Transfer	Winter	2016	Undisclosed	
42	FW	(Austria)	Stefan Maierhofer	32	EU	Wiener Neustadt (Austria)	Free transfer	Winter	2015	Free	
—	DF	(Jamaica)	Shaun Cummings	25	EU	Reading	Transfer	Winter	2017	Undisclosed	

=== Out ===
No.	Pos.	Nat.	Name	Age	EU	Moving to	Type	Transfer window	Transfer fee	Source
7	MF	(England)	Liam Feeney	27	EU	Bolton Wanderers	Released	Summer	Free	
20	FW	(Republic of Ireland)	Andy Keogh	27	EU	Perth Glory (Australia)	Released	Summer	Free	
12	DF	(Australia)	Shane Lowry	24	EU	Leyton Orient	Released	Summer	Free	
21	DF	(England)	Jack Smith	30	EU	AFC Wimbledon	Released	Summer	Free	
6	MF	(England)	Liam Trotter	25	EU	Bolton Wanderers	Transfer	Summer	Free	
19	FW	(Canada)	Simeon Jackson	27	EU	Coventry City	Free transfer	Summer	Free	
4	MF	(England)	Josh Wright	25	EU	Leyton Orient	Released	Winter	Free	
5	DF	(England)	Paul Robinson	32	EU	Portsmouth	Released	Winter	Free	
28	DF	(England)	Scott Malone	23	EU	Cardiff City (Wales)	Transfer	Winter	£100,000	
10	FW	(Wales)	Jermaine Easter	32	EU	Bristol Rovers	Released	Winter	Free	
43	GK	(England)	Stephen Bywater	33	EU	Doncaster Rovers	Released	Winter	Free	
27	FW	(Australia)	Scott McDonald	31	EU	Free agent	Released	Winter	Free	

EU = if holds or not a European Union passport; Country: when 2 flags, 1st flag = country that plays for internationally, 2nd flag = country of birth; N = number on jersey; P = Position (for position name, pause mouse pointer on abbreviation); Name = Name on jersey (for more extensive name, pause mouse pointer on name); Age = age on the day of the signing; Moving from = only indicate the club the player was playing before start playing for this club in this season, for the type of the moving see Status column; Moving to = only indicates the club the player is going to play next, for the type of the moving see Status column; Ends = when the player's current contract ends; n/a = Not applicable.

=== Loans in ===
No.	Pos.	Name	Country	Age	Loan club	Started	Ended	Start source	End source
21	FW	Mathias Ranégie	(Sweden)	30	Watford	28 August 2014	15 January 2015		
29	DF	Andy Wilkinson	(England)	30	Stoke City	20 October 2014	19 January 2015		
21	DF	Dan Harding	(England)	31	Nottingham Forest	5 January 2015	30 June 2015		
8	MF	Diego Fabbrini	(Italy)	24	Watford	16 January 2015	26 March 2015		
5	DF	Jos Hooiveld	(Netherlands)	31	Southampton	26 January 2015	30 June 2015		
28	MF	Michael Tonge	(England)	31	Leeds United	2 February 2015	30 June 2015		
27	GK	Jordan Archer	(Scotland)	21	Tottenham Hotspur	2 February 2015	30 June 2015		
—	FW	Gary Taylor-Fletcher	(England)	33	Leicester City	20 February 2015	30 June 2015		

Sources: For loan start source see "Start source". For loan end source see "End source".
EU = if holds or not a European Union passport; Country: when 2 flags, 1st flag = country that plays for internationally, 2nd flag = country of birth; No. = number on jersey; P = Position (for position name, pause mouse pointer on abbreviation); Name = Name on jersey (for more extensive name, pause mouse pointer on name); In/Out = In: The player came in on loan, Out: The player went out on loan; Loan club = the club that the player moved on loan to or the club that the player came from on loan; Started = the date when the player's loan started; Ended = the date when the player's loan ended.

=== Loans out ===
No.	Pos.	Name	Country	Age	Loan club	Started	Ended	Start source	End source
5	DF	Paul Robinson	(England)	32	Portsmouth	6 August 2014	5 January 2014		
43	GK	Stephen Bywater	(England)	33	Gillingham	15 August 2014	3 January 2015		
32	FW	John Marquis	(England)	22	Cheltenham Town	28 August 2014	26 November 2014		
4	MF	Josh Wright	(England)	24	Crawley Town	9 September 2014	10 October 2014		
13	GK	Denzel Gerrar	(England)	20	Histon	14 October 2014	11 November 2014		
24	DF	Jake Goodman	(England)	21	AFC Wimbledon	27 November 2014	30 June 2015		
20	MF	Fred Onyedinma	(Nigeria)	18	Wycombe Wanderers	27 November 2014	3 January 2015		
–	DF	Dylan Casey	(Republic of Ireland)	19	Kingstonian	10 December 2014	2 February 2015		
32	FW	John Marquis	(England)	22	Gillingham	8 January 2015	30 June 2015		
14	DF	Matthew Briggs	(England)	23	Colchester United	22 January 2015	30 June 2015		
—	MF	Callum Webb	(England)	19	Kingstonian	2 February 2015	3 March 2015		
17	DF	Byron Webster	(England)	27	Yeovil Town	19 February 2015	30 June 2015		
30	MF	Richard Chaplow	(England)	30	Ipswich Town	20 February 2015	30 June 2015		

Sources: For loan start source see "Start source". For loan end source see "End source".
EU = if holds or not a European Union passport; Country: when 2 flags, 1st flag = country that plays for internationally, 2nd flag = country of birth; No. = number on jersey; P = Position (for position name, pause mouse pointer on abbreviation); Name = Name on jersey (for more extensive name, pause mouse pointer on name); In/Out = In: The player came in on loan, Out: The player went out on loan; Loan club = the club that the player moved on loan to or the club that the player came from on loan; Started = the date when the player's loan started; Ended = the date when the player's loan ended.
