= Mahlon Romeo =

Antiguan footballer (born 1995)

Personal information
- Full name: Mahlon Beresford Baker Romeo
- Date of birth: 19 September 1995 (age 31)
- Place of birth: Westminster, England
- Height: 1.78 m (5 ft 10 in)
- Position: Defender

Youth career
- –2012: Arsenal
- 2012–2013: Gillingham

Senior career*
Years	Team	Apps	(Gls)
2013–2015	Gillingham	1	(0)
2013	→ Dover Athletic (loan)	1	(0)
2015–2022	Millwall	198	(2)
2021–2022	→ Portsmouth (loan)	35	(0)
2022–2024	Cardiff City	48	(0)

International career^{‡}
2015–	Antigua and Barbuda	14	(0)
- * Club domestic league appearances and goals as of 30 August 2024 (UTC) ‡ National team caps and goals as of 11:30, 2 May 2023 (UTC)

Mahlon Beresford Baker Romeo (born 19 September 1995) is a professional footballer who plays as a defender. Born in England, he plays for the Antigua and Barbuda national team.

== Career ==
=== Gillingham ===
Born in the London Borough of Westminster, Romeo joined Gillingham in the summer of 2012 on a two-year scholarship, having previously played in the academies of clubs Arsenal and Wycombe Wanderers. In January 2013, Romeo joined Conference South side Dover Athletic on a youth loan. He made his debut in a 5–2 away defeat to Farnborough. He made his professional debut for Gillingham on the final day of the 2012–13 season as the Gills were crowned champions of Football League Two, a 3–2 away defeat at Burton Albion.

=== Millwall ===
In the summer of 2015, Romeo signed for Millwall and featured regularly in the first team by the second half of his first season with the Lions. He scored on his debut for Millwall, in a 3–0 League One win in February 2016 against Walsall. In May 2017, Romeo played the full 90 minutes as the Lions beat Bradford City 1–0 in the 2016-17 Football League One Playoff final at Wembley Stadium to gain promotion to the Championship.

Romeo then scored his first goal of the club's 2017–18 season in a 3–1 win over Sheffield United.

On 31 August 2021, Romeo joined Portsmouth on loan for the 2021–22 season.

=== Cardiff City ===
On 15 June 2022, Romeo joined Championship club Cardiff City for an undisclosed fee on a three-year deal. Romeo had previously played with new manager Steve Morison at Millwall.

On 30 July 2024, his contract with Cardiff City was terminated.

== Personal life ==
Romeo is the son of fitness expert Efua Baker and music producer and musician Jazzie B; best known as the frontman of the R&B group Soul II Soul, while his sister is actress Jessye Romeo. He is of Antiguan descent through his father, and Ghanaian through his mother.

In June 2024, WalesOnline revealed that Romeo had been convicted of homophobic abuse of a police officer earlier that year. Romeo entered a guilty plea to using "threatening, abusive, or insulting" language or actions and was ordered to pay the victim £100 and was fined £3,317. Romeo was fined £4,423 at a previous hearing in March for operating a vehicle while affected by alcohol. WalesOnline reported Romeo had used homophobic slurs while being held in a Cardiff police station after he had been arrested for drink-driving. The day after the publication of WalesOnline's article, Romeo issued a statement on the incident, saying: "I would like to sincerely apologise to the club and its supporters for my actions on February 8, 2024, which have caused hurt and distress. Those who know me closely know that I do not hold any prejudice against anyone based on their sexual orientation or sexuality. In the past I have worked hard to fight against discrimination and prejudice and so my actions that evening are of great personal disappointment."

== Career statistics ==
=== Club ===
As of match played 30 April 2023

Appearances and goals by club, season and competition
Club	Season	League			FA Cup		League Cup		Other		Total	
Club	Season	Division	Apps	Goals	Apps	Goals	Apps	Goals	Apps	Goals	Apps	Goals
Gillingham	2012–13	League Two	1	0	0	0	0	0	0	0	1	0
Gillingham	2014–15	League One	0	0	0	0	0	0	0	0	0	0
Gillingham	Total		1	0	0	0	0	0	0	0	1	0
Dover Athletic (loan)	2012–13	Conference South	1	0	—		—		—		1	0
Millwall	2015–16	League One	18	1	0	0	0	0	0	0	18	1
Millwall	2016–17	League One	32	0	3	1	1	0	4 (Note: One appearance in EFL Trophy, three appearances in League One play-offs)	0	40	1
Millwall	2017–18	Championship	27	1	2	0	2	0	—		31	1
Millwall	2018–19	Championship	41	0	4	0	2	0	—		47	0
Millwall	2019–20	Championship	43	0	0	0	1	0	—		44	0
Millwall	2020–21	Championship	35	0	1	0	2	0	—		38	0
Millwall	2021–22	Championship	2	0	0	0	1	0	—		3	0
Millwall	Total		198	2	10	1	9	0	4	0	221	3
Portsmouth (loan)	2021–22	League One	35	0	2	0	0	0	4 (Note: Appearances in EFL Trophy)	0	41	0
Cardiff City	2022–23	Championship	32	0	0	0	0	0	—		32	0
Career total			267	2	12	1	9	0	8	0	296	3

=== International ===
As of match played 26 March 2023

Appearances and goals by national team and year
National team	Year	Apps	Goals
Antigua and Barbuda	2015	4	0
Antigua and Barbuda	2016	4	0
Antigua and Barbuda	2018	4	0
Antigua and Barbuda	2023	2	0
Total		14	0

== Honours ==
Millwall

- EFL League One play-offs: 2017
