= Sid Nelson =

English footballer (born 1996)

Personal information
- Full name: Sidney Raymond Kenneth Nelson
- Date of birth: 1 January 1996 (age 30)
- Place of birth: Lewisham, England
- Height: 6 ft 1 in (1.85 m)
- Position: Centre back

Team information
- Current team: Chatham Town

Youth career
- 2004–2014: Millwall

Senior career*
Years	Team	Apps	(Gls)
2014–2019	Millwall	26	(0)
2017	→ Newport County (loan)	14	(0)
2017–2018	→ Yeovil Town (loan)	12	(0)
2018	→ Chesterfield (loan)	15	(1)
2018–2019	→ Swindon Town (loan)	20	(0)
2019	→ Tranmere Rovers (loan)	7	(0)
2019–2021	Tranmere Rovers	28	(0)
2021–2022	Northampton Town	2	(0)
2022–2023	Woking	2	(0)
2022	→ Welling United (loan)	6	(0)
2023–2024	Farnborough	17	(0)
2024–	Chatham Town	69	(2)
- * Club domestic league appearances and goals as of 10:31, 27 April 2026 (UTC)

Sidney Raymond Kenneth Nelson (born 1 January 1996) is an English professional footballer who plays as a centre back for Isthmian League Premier Division club Chatham Town.

== Career ==
Nelson was born in Lewisham, Greater London. He first signed for Millwall at the age of eight. He was captain of their youth team, and turned professional in August 2014. He made his senior debut for them on 28 December 2014. He was praised by manager Ian Holloway as the team's "best player" in that match. Nelson stated it was a "dream" to play for the club his family supports.

On 4 January 2017, Nelson joined League Two side Newport County on loan until the end of the 2016–17 season. He made his debut on 7 January, playing the full 90 minutes in a 1–3 away league defeat at Stevenage. Nelson was part of the Newport squad that completed the 'Great Escape' with a 2–1 victory at home to Notts County on the final day of the 2016–17 season, which ensured Newport's survival in League Two.

On 21 August 2017, Nelson signed for League Two club Yeovil Town on loan until January 2018. He moved on loan to Chesterfield in January 2018.

He was offered a new contract by Millwall at the end of the 2017–18 season. He moved on loan to Swindon Town in August 2018.

In January 2019, Nelson joined League Two side Tranmere Rovers on loan until the end of the 2018–19 season.

In May 2019, it was announced that Nelson would be one of five players released by Millwall when their contracts expired.

In June 2019 he signed a two-year contract with Tranmere Rovers.

On 9 July 2021, Nelson joined Northampton Town on a one-year deal. He suffered an injury in training in September 2021, a situation he described as a "nightmare".

On 13 July 2022, Nelson agreed to join National League side, Woking on a one-year deal. On 18 October 2022, Nelson joined National League South club Welling United on a one-month loan deal.

On 29 May 2023, Nelson agreed to join National League South side, Farnborough following his release from Woking.

On 10 February 2024, Nelson signed for Isthmian League Premier Division club Chatham Town.

== Career statistics ==
As of 3 May 2024

Appearances and goals by club, season and competition
Club	Season	League			FA Cup		League Cup		Other		Total	
Club	Season	Division	Apps	Goals	Apps	Goals	Apps	Goals	Apps	Goals	Apps	Goals
Millwall	2014–15	Championship	14	0	1	0	0	0	—		15	0
Millwall	2015–16	League One	9	0	1	0	1	0	3 (Note: Appearances in Football League Trophy)	0	14	0
Millwall	2016–17	League One	3	0	1	0	2	0	3 (Note: Appearance(s) in EFL Trophy)	0	9	0
Millwall	2017–18	Championship	0	0	0	0	0	0	—		0	0
Millwall	2018–19	Championship	0	0	0	0	0	0	—		0	0
Millwall	Total		26	0	3	0	3	0	6	0	38	0
Newport County (loan)	2016–17	League Two	14	0	—		—		—		14	0
Yeovil Town (loan)	2017–18	League Two	12	0	0	0	0	0	2	0	14	0
Chesterfield (loan)	2017–18	League Two	15	1	—		—		—		15	1
Swindon Town (loan)	2018–19	League Two	20	0	1	0	1	0	2	0	24	0
Tranmere Rovers (loan)	2018–19	League Two	7	0	—		—		3 (Note: Appearances in League Two play-offs)	0	10	0
Tranmere Rovers	2019–20	League One	19	0	4	0	0	0	3	0	26	0
Tranmere Rovers	2020–21	League Two	9	0	0	0	0	0	4	0	13	0
Tranmere Rovers	Total		28	0	4	0	0	0	7	0	39	0
Northampton Town	2021–22	League Two	2	0	0	0	1	0	1	0	4	0
Woking	2022–23	National League	2	0	0	0	—		0	0	2	0
Welling United (loan)	2022–23	National League South	6	0	—		—		—		6	0
Farnborough	2023–24	National League South	17	0	1	0	—		1 (Note: Appearance(s) in FA Trophy)	0	19	0
Chatham Town	2023–24	Isthmian League Premier Division	12	0	—		—		1	0	13	0
Career total			161	1	9	0	5	0	23	0	198	1

== Honours ==
Tranmere Rovers

- EFL League Two play-offs: 2019
