= Jamie Philpot =

English footballer (born 1996)

James Philpot
Personal information
- Full name: James Frederick Philpot
- Date of birth: 2 October 1996 (age 30)
- Place of birth: Pembury, England
- Height: 1.81 m (5 ft 11 1/2 in)
- Position: Striker

Team information
- Current team: Glebe

Youth career
- 2005–2015: Millwall

Senior career*
Years	Team	Apps	(Gls)
2015–2018	Millwall	9	(1)
2016	→ Bromley (loan)	3	(0)
2017–2018	→ Woking (loan)	26	(3)
2018	→ Welling United (loan)	14	(6)
2018–2019	Dartford	21	(5)
2019	Maidstone United	1	(0)
2019	Bromley	3	(0)
2019	Barrow	7	(0)
2019	Staines Town	5	(1)
2019–	Glebe	133	(101)
- * Club domestic league appearances and goals as of 22:40, 04 April 2023 (UTC)

James Frederick Philpot (born 2 October 1996) is an English footballer who plays as a striker for Glebe.

== Club career ==
=== Millwall ===
Philpot was first called up to a Millwall matchday squad on 21 March 2015, remaining an unused substitute in their 2–2 Championship draw with Brentford at Griffin Park. His next call-up was for their final game of the season following relegation to League One, away to Wolverhampton Wanderers at the Molineux. He came on for his debut as an 80th-minute substitute for Lee Martin, and less than two minutes later scored. However, in the 89th minute, he was substituted for fellow debutant Alfie Pavey due to injury and Millwall lost 2–4. After an unfortunate lay-off through injury, Philpot returned to first team action for The Lions after coming on as a second-half substitute in the 3–0 win against Blackpool. This followed a number of impressive displays in Millwall's under-21s.

On 21 October 2016, Philpot signed a 28-day loan with National League club Bromley. He made three appearances for The Ravens, before returning to Millwall on 15 November 2016.

On 3 August 2017, Philpot joined Woking on loan until January 2018. On 5 August 2017, Philpot made his Woking debut during their 2–1 home victory over Gateshead, replacing Bobson Bawling in the 70th minute. Philpot scored his first goal for Woking in their 2–1 win against AFC Fylde in the National League on 23 September 2017. A week later, Philpot continued his impressive form, scoring Woking's equaliser in their 1–1 home draw against Hartlepool United. Philpot scored once again three days later in their 2–0 away victory against Chester, latching onto a poor back pass and rounding the goalkeeper. Philpot returned to Millwall in January 2018, following the conclusion of his loan spell.

On 12 February 2018, Philpot joined National League South side Welling United on a one-month loan deal. Just under a week later, he scored on his debut during Welling's 3–1 home victory over St Albans City. On 14 March 2018, Philpot's loan was extended until the end of the campaign. In total, Philpot netted six times in fourteen appearances before returning to Millwall at the end of the season.

He was released by Millwall at the end of the 2017–18 season.

=== Dartford ===
On 1 August 2018, Philpot joined National League South side Dartford. Philpot left Dartford on 18 January 2019.

=== Maidstone United ===
On the same day as his release from Dartford, Philpot joined National League side Maidstone United on trial.

=== Bromley ===
On 9 February 2019, Philpot joined Bromley. On 12 March 2019, Bromley announced that Philpot had left the club having made just three substitute appearances.

=== Barrow ===
On 22 March 2019, Philpot joined Barrow on non-contract terms.

=== Staines Town ===
On 26 July 2019, Philpot joined Staines Town for the 2019/20 season.

=== Glebe ===
On 16 September 2019, Philpot joined Glebe in the Southern Counties East Premier Division having left Staines Town. On 30 April 2022, The Foxes announced that Philpot had signed a new contract until the end of the 2022–23 season.

== Career statistics ==
As of match played 11 April 2022

Appearances and goals by club, season and competition
Club	Season	League			FA Cup		League Cup		Other		Total	
Club	Season	Division	Apps	Goals	Apps	Goals	Apps	Goals	Apps	Goals	Apps	Goals
Millwall	2014–15	Championship	1	1	0	0	0	0	—		1	1
Millwall	2015–16	League One	6	0	0	0	0	0	0	0	6	0
Millwall	2016–17	League One	2	0	0	0	2	0	1 (Note: Appearance in the EFL Trophy)	0	5	0
Millwall	2017–18	Championship	0	0	0	0	0	0	—		0	0
Millwall	Total		9	1	0	0	2	0	1	0	12	1
Bromley (loan)	2016–17	National League	3	0	—		—		0	0	3	0
Woking (loan)	2017–18	National League	26	3	6	3	—		1 (Note: Appearance in the FA Trophy)	0	33	6
Welling United (loan)	2017–18	National League South	14	6	—		—		—		14	6
Dartford	2018–19	National League South	21	5	2	0	—		2	0	25	5
Maidstone United	2018–19	National League	1	0	—		—		1 (Note: Appearance in the Kent Senior Cup)	0	2	0
Bromley	2018–19	National League	3	0	—		—		—		3	0
Barrow	2018–19	National League	7	0	—		—		—		7	0
Staines Town	2019–20	Isthmian League South Central Division	5	1	2	2	—		1 (Note: Appearance in the Alan Turvey Trophy)	1	8	4
Glebe	2019–20	Southern Counties East League Premier Division	31	24	—		—		7 (Note: Four appearances and two goals in the FA Vase, three appearances and one goal in the Southern Counties East League Challenge Cup)	3	38	27
Glebe	2020–21	Southern Counties East League Premier Division	13	6	0	0	—		0	0	13	6
Glebe	2021–22	Southern Counties East League Premier Division	47	43	1	1	—		5 (Note: Four appearances and two goals in the FA Vase, one appearances and two goals in the Southern Counties East League Challenge Cup)	4	53	48
Glebe	Total		91	73	1	1	—		12	7	104	81
Career total			180	89	11	6	2	0	18	8	211	103
