= John Berylson =

American businessman (1953–2023)

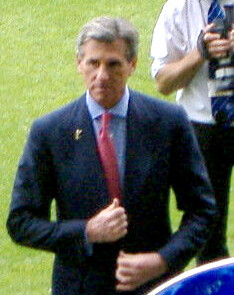
- Berylson at The Den in 2010
- Born: John Gregory Berylson; 2 June 1953; New York City, U.S.
- Died: 4 July 2023 (aged 70); Falmouth, Massachusetts, U.S.
- Education: Brown University (B.A.); Harvard Business School (M.B.A.); New York University (M.S.)

John Gregory Berylson (2 June 1953 – 4 July 2023) was an American businessman and founder of Chestnut Hill Ventures LLC. He was also the chairman of London football team Millwall from 2007 until his death in 2023.

== Education ==
Berylson earned an B.A. degree from Brown University in 1975, attended Harvard Business School earning an M.B.A., and attended New York University, where he earned an M.S.

== Career ==
Berylson was the director of Youngworld Stores Group, Inc and Non Executive Chairman, Member of Audit Committee and Member of Remuneration Committee of Millwall Holdings PLC. Berylson pumped an estimated £100m into the club.

Berylson was also the director of Manifold Capital Corp. Berylson had been reported as being a Republican, having donated to John McCain in the 2008 Presidential Election, however, Berylson denied this and said that he was a registered Democrat.

Berylson was a member of the Jewish faith and had 3 children.

Berylson was once a US Marine, and a fan of the Boston Red Sox. He held numerous Trustee positions; at the Beth Israel Deaconess Medical Center, The Newton-Wellesley Hospital, Brown University Sports Foundation, and he held the position of Director at the Brown University Library System.

== Personal life ==
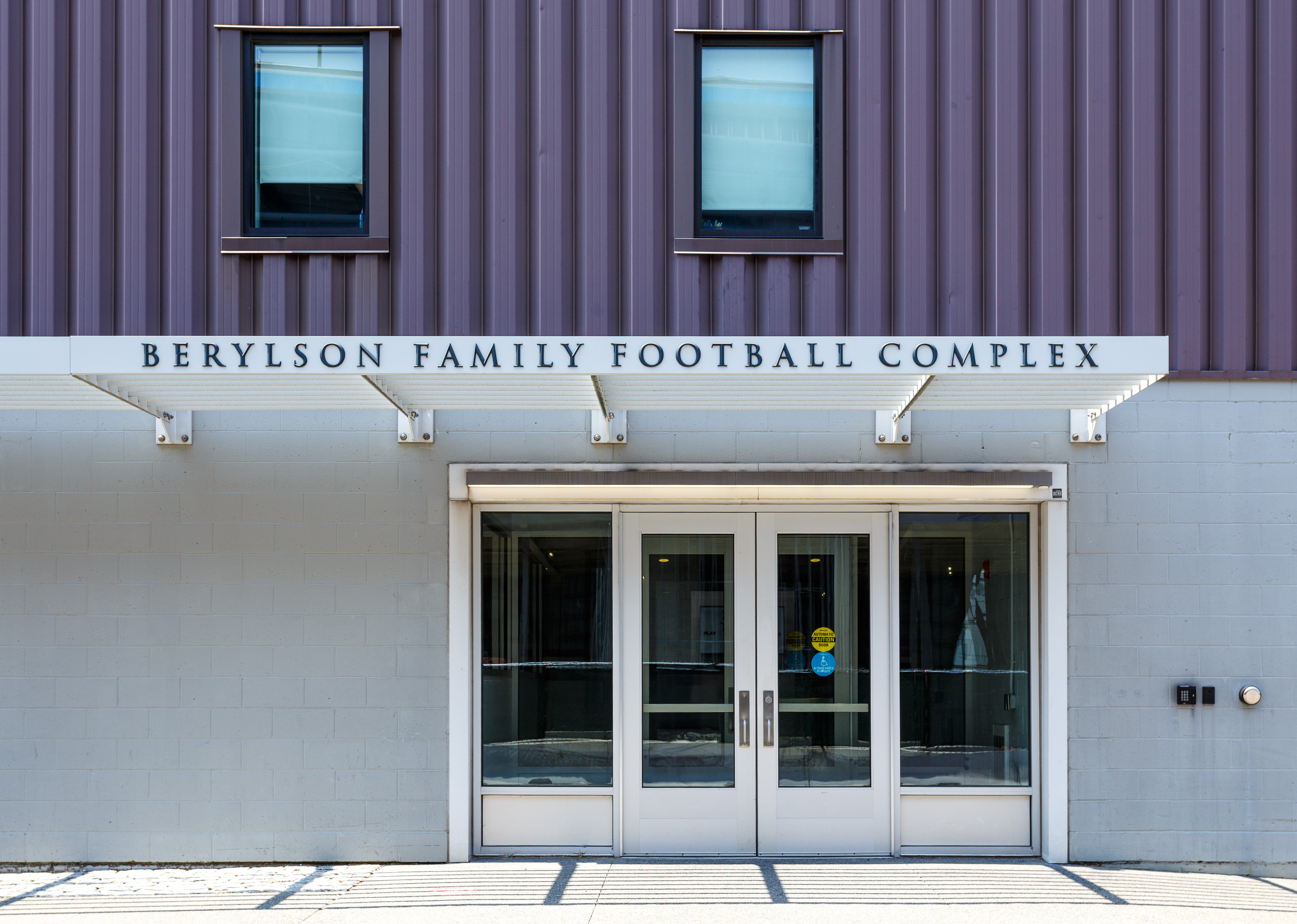
Berylson served as lead donor for the Berylson Family Football Complex at Brown University

Berylson was a philanthropist. He and his wife Amy moved their philanthropy through the Amy Smith and John G. Berylson Foundation. They primarily supported education, as well as philanthropy in Boston through the Richard and Susan Smith Family Foundation. Berylson was a longtime financial supporter of the Brown University football program.

=== Death ===
Berylson died in a car crash on 4 July 2023, at the age of 70. Berylson was driving in Falmouth, Massachusetts, lost control of his Range Rover and hit a tree. He was pronounced dead at the scene.
