= 2017–18 Millwall F.C. season =

Millwall F.C.
2017–18 season
- Chairman: John Berylson
- Manager: Neil Harris
- Stadium: The Den
- Championship: 8th
- FA Cup: Fourth round (eliminated by Rochdale)
- EFL Cup: Second round (eliminated by Reading)
- Top goalscorer: League: Lee Gregory (10); All: Lee Gregory; George Saville (10)
- Highest home attendance: 17,614 (vs Fulham)
- Lowest home attendance: 3,096 (vs Stevenage)
- Average home league attendance: 13, 368
Home colours	Away colours	Third colours

The 2017–18 season is Millwall's 133rd year in existence, 92nd consecutive season in The Football League and 41st in the second tier. Millwall return to The Championship after a two-year absence. They secured promotion from League One via the playoffs. The Lions went on a club record 17-game unbeaten run; their longest streak in the second tier, which surpassed a record of 15 set in 1971. This season Millwall won six away wins in a row, equalling a club record set in the 2008–09 season. The Lions finished in eighth position, their highest league finish since the 2001–02 season. Millwall competed in the FA Cup, losing to Rochdale in a fourth round replay. They also took part in the League Cup, going out to Reading in the second round. The season covers the period from 1 July 2017 to 30 June 2018.

== Pre-season ==
=== Friendlies ===
Millwall announced four pre-season friendlies against Dartford, Barnet, Stevenage and Spanish side Granada.

8 July 2017	Dartford	1–1	Millwall	Dartford
13:00 BST	Logan 31'	Report	Thompson 64'	Stadium: Princes Park; Attendance: 2,201; Referee: Charles Breakspear

22 July 2017	Barnet	1–0	Millwall	Canons Park
15:00 BST	Akinde 19'	Report		Stadium: The Hive Stadium; Referee: R Eames

25 July 2017	Stevenage	0–0	Millwall	Stevenage
19:45 BST		Report		Stadium: Lamex Stadium; Referee: Alan Young

29 July 2017	Millwall	3–0	Granada	Bermondsey
15:00 BST	Wallace 28'; Williams 52'; O'Brien 53'	Report		Stadium: The Den; Attendance: 1,926; Referee: Charles Breakspear

== Competitions ==
=== Championship ===
==== League table ====
Pos	Team	Pld	W	D	L	GF	GA	GD	Pts	Promotion, qualification or relegation
6	Derby County	46	20	15	11	70	48	+22	75	Qualification for Championship play-offs (Note: Four teams play for one spot and promotion to the Premier League.)
7	Preston North End	46	19	16	11	57	46	+11	73	
8	Millwall	46	19	15	12	56	45	+11	72	
9	Brentford	46	18	15	13	62	52	+10	69	
10	Sheffield United	46	20	9	17	62	55	+7	69	

Source: English Football League
Rules for classification: 1) Points; 2) Goal difference; 3) Number of goals scored

==== Result summary ====
Overall								Home						Away					
Pld	W	D	L	GF	GA	GD	Pts	W	D	L	GF	GA	GD	W	D	L	GF	GA	GD
46	19	15	12	56	45	+11	72	12	7	4	32	22	+10	7	8	8	24	23	+1

Last updated: 6 May 2018.

==== Results by matchday ====
Matchday	1	2	3	4	5	6	7	8	9	10	11	12	13	14	15	16	17	18	19	20	21	22	23	24	25	26	27	28	29	30	31	32	33	34	35	36	37	38	39	40	41	42	43	44	45	46
Ground	A	H	H	A	H	A	A	H	A	H	H	A	H	A	A	H	A	H	A	H	A	H	A	H	H	A	H	A	H	A	H	A	H	A	H	A	H	A	H	A	H	A	A	H	A	H
Result	L	D	L	D	W	L	D	W	D	W	L	L	W	D	L	L	D	D	L	W	D	W	L	D	W	L	D	W	D	W	D	W	W	W	D	W	W	W	W	D	W	W	D	L	L	W
Position	17	16	21	23	17	19	19	16	16	12	13	16	15	15	16	19	18	18	19	17	17	17	17	16	15	15	16	15	14	14	14	14	13	11	11	11	10	10	8	8	7	6	6	6	8	8

Updated to match(es) played on 6 May 2018. Source: Statto.com
A = Away; H = Home; W = Win; D = Draw; L = Loss

==== Matches ====
On 21 June 2017, the league fixtures were announced.

4 August 2017 1	Nottingham Forest	1–0	Millwall	West Bridgford
19:45 BST	McKay 41'	Report	Saville (yellow card) 89'	Stadium: City Ground; Referee: Peter Bankes

12 August 2017 2	Millwall	1–1	Bolton Wanderers	Bermondsey
15:00 BST	Saville 49'; Hutchinson (yellow card) 68'; McLaughlin (yellow card) 85'	Report	Burke (yellow card) 4'; Morais 62'; Taylor (yellow card) 88'; Karacan (yellow card) 90+2'	Stadium: The Den; Attendance: 12,238; Referee: Andy Davies

15 August 2017 3	Millwall	3–4	Ipswich Town	Bermondsey
19:45 BST	Wallace 1'; Meredith (yellow card) 31'; O'Brien 36'; Elliott 80'	Report	Garner 4' (yellow card) 69'; Ward (yellow card) 24'; Waghorn 34', 45+3'; Chambers (yellow card) 79'; Spence 88'; Iorfa (yellow card) 90+5'	Stadium: The Den; Attendance: 11,919; Referee: James Linington

19 August 2017 4	Bristol City	0–0	Millwall	Ashton Gate
15:00 BST	Brownhill (yellow card) 52'; Reid (yellow card) 87'	Report	O'Brien (yellow card) 9'; Morison (yellow card) 90+2'	Stadium: Ashton Gate Stadium; Attendance: 18,230; Referee: Darren England

26 August 2017 5	Millwall	4–0	Norwich City	Bermondsey
15:00 BST	Gregory 15'; Saville 17' (yellow card) 35'; Wallace 42'; Webster (yellow card) 63'; Hutchinson 72'	Report	Husband (yellow card) 58'	Stadium: The Den; Attendance: 13,671; Referee: Tony Harrington

9 September 2017 6	Wolverhampton Wanderers	1–0	Millwall	Wolverhampton
15:00 BST	Diogo Jota 10'; Batth (yellow card) 57'	Report	Webster (yellow card) 41'; O'Brien (yellow card) 55' (yellow-red card) 65'	Stadium: Molineux Stadium; Attendance: 24,426; Referee: Bobby Madley

12 September 2017 7	Queens Park Rangers	2–2	Millwall	London
19:45 BST	Onuoha (yellow card) 11'; Freeman (yellow card) 39'; Luongo 73'; Smith 85'	Report	McLaughlin 6', (yellow card) 83'; Williams (yellow card) 26'; Gregory (red card) 41'; Wallace 50'; Morison (yellow card) 51'; Archer (yellow card) 70'; Tunnicliffe (yellow card) 80'	Stadium: Loftus Road; Attendance: 12,600; Referee: Roger East

16 September 2017 8	Millwall	1–0	Leeds United	Bermondsey
15:00 BST	Saville (yellow card) 61'; O'Brien 73'	Report	Shaughnessy (yellow card) 43'; Sáiz (yellow card) 47'; O'Kane (yellow card) 69'	Stadium: The Den; Attendance: 16,447; Referee: Tim Robinson

23 September 2017 9	Preston North End	0–0	Millwall	Preston
15:00 BST		Report		Stadium: Deepdale; Attendance: 12,363; Referee: Darren Bond

26 September 2017 10	Millwall	2–1	Reading	Bermondsey
19:45 BST	Saville 80', 85'; Wallace (yellow card) 87'	Report	Edwards 73'	Stadium: The Den; Attendance: 10,399; Referee: Andrew Madley

30 September 2017 11	Millwall	1–3	Barnsley	Bermondsey
15:00 BST	Gregory 45+2' (pen.); Wallace (yellow card) 64'; Ferguson (yellow card) 82'	Report	Bradshaw 40', 60'; Pearson (yellow card) 45+1'; McGeehan (yellow card) 48'; Thiam 83' (pen.); McCarthy (yellow card) 85'	Stadium: The Den; Attendance: 12,147; Referee: Oliver Langford

14 October 2017 12	Brentford	1–0	Millwall	London
15:00 BST	Sawyers 47'; Woods (yellow card) 83'; Mepham (yellow card) 90+3'	Report	Ferguson (yellow card) 53'	Stadium: Griffin Park; Attendance: 9,622; Referee: Lee Probert

21 October 2017 13	Millwall	2–0	Birmingham City	Bermondsey
17:30 BST	Colin 47' (o.g.); Tunnicliffe 76', (yellow card) 90+4'; McLaughlin (yellow card) 87'	Report	Colin (yellow card) 38'; Morrison (yellow card) 48'	Stadium: The Den; Attendance: 14,797; Referee: Simon Hooper

28 October 2017 14	Cardiff City	0–0	Millwall	Cardiff
15:00 BST	Ralls (yellow card) 78'; Tomlin (yellow card) 88'	Report	Meredith (yellow card) 72'	Stadium: Cardiff City Stadium; Attendance: 18,496; Referee: Stephen Martin

31 October 2017 15	Sheffield Wednesday	2–1	Millwall	Owlerton
19:45 GMT	Reach 3'; Rhodes 43'	Report	Elliott 13'; Cooper (yellow card) 53' (yellow-red card) 90+2'	Stadium: Hillsborough Stadium; Attendance: 23,403; Referee: James Linington

4 November 2017 16	Millwall	0–1	Burton Albion	Bermondsey
15:00 GMT	Meredith (yellow card) 45+1'; Wallace (red card) 58'	Report	Sordell 70'; Turner (yellow card) 74'; Bywater (yellow card) 88'	Stadium: The Den; Attendance: 11,507; Referee: Tony Harrington

17 November 2017 17	Sunderland	2–2	Millwall	Sunderland
15:00 GMT	Grabban 12'; Matthews 46'; Oviedo (yellow card) 62'; Cattermole (yellow card) 65'; Honeyman (yellow card) 69'	Report	Saville 16', 20'	Stadium: Stadium of Light; Attendance: 27,399; Referee: Tim Robinson

21 November 2017 18	Millwall	0–0	Hull City	Bermondsey
19:45 GMT	McLaughlin (yellow card) 57'	Report	Irvine (yellow card) 56'; Campbell (yellow card) 71'	Stadium: The Den; Attendance: 9,817; Referee: Jeremy Simpson

25 November 2017 19	Fulham	1–0	Millwall	London
15:00 GMT	Norwood 45+2'	Report	McLaughlin (yellow card) 45+1'; Saville (yellow card) 72'	Stadium: Craven Cottage; Attendance: 17,984; Referee: Paul Tierney

2 December 2017 20	Millwall	3–1	Sheffield United	Bermondsey
15:00 GMT	Gregory 14'; Romeo 66'; Cooper 87'	Report	Brooks (yellow card) 10', (goal) 41'	Stadium: The Den; Attendance: 12,669; Referee: Andy Madley

9 December 2017 21	Aston Villa	0–0	Millwall	Aston
15:00 GMT	Whelan (yellow card) 76'	Report	Saville (yellow card) 55'; Wallace (yellow card) 70'; Cooper (yellow card) 90'	Stadium: Villa Park; Attendance: 29,628; Referee: Andrew Davies

16 December 2017 22	Millwall	2–1	Middlesbrough	Bermondsey
15:00 GMT	Wallace 31'; Saville 37'	Report	Downing 67'	Stadium: The Den; Attendance: 12,026; Referee: Oliver Langford

23 December 2017 23	Derby County	3–0	Millwall	Derby
15:00 GMT	Nugent 23', 28'; Vydra 25'	Report	Cooper (yellow card) 54'	Stadium: Pride Park Stadium; Attendance: 25,813; Referee: Darren England

26 December 2017 24	Millwall	2–2	Wolverhampton Wanderers	Bermondsey
13:00 GMT	Gregory 13'; Cooper 72'	Report	Jota 45+4'; Saïss 56'	Stadium: The Den; Attendance: 13,121; Referee: Tim Robinson

29 December 2017 25	Millwall	1–0	Queens Park Rangers	Bermondsey
19:45 GMT	Morison 55'; Cooper (yellow card) 90'	Report	Wszołek (yellow card) 51'	Stadium: The Den; Attendance: 16,601; Referee: Keith Stroud

1 January 2018 26	Norwich City	2–1	Millwall	Norwich
15:00 GMT	Trybull 52'; Maddison	Report	Morison 44'; Wallace (yellow card) 86'	Stadium: Carrow Road; Attendance: 25,774; Referee: Steve Martin

13 January 2018 27	Millwall	1–1	Preston North End	Bermondsey
15:00 GMT	O'Brien 43'; Gregory (yellow card) 70'	Report	Pearson (yellow card) 58'; Hugill (yellow card) 77'; Robinson 80'	Stadium: The Den; Attendance: 11,751; Referee: Jeremy Simpson

20 January 2018 28	Leeds United	3–4	Millwall	Leeds
15:00 GMT	Cooper (red card) 37'; Jansson (yellow card) 41'; Lasogga 46', 62'; Roofe 55'; Ezgjan Alioski (yellow card) 58'; Phillips (yellow card) 86'	Report	O'Brien 18'; Gregory 42'; Hutchinson (yellow card) 51'; Elliott 87' (yellow card) 90'; Wallace 90+2'	Stadium: Elland Road; Attendance: 33,564; Referee: David Coote

30 January 2018 29	Millwall	0–0	Derby County	Bermondsey
19:45 GMT	Elliott (yellow card) 71'; McLaughlin (yellow card) 90'	Report	Wisdom (yellow card) 85'	Stadium: The Den; Attendance: 10,931; Referee: Oliver Langford

3 February 2018 30	Reading	0–2	Millwall	Reading
15:00 GMT	Ilori (yellow card) 18'; Edwards (yellow card) 83'; Bacuna (yellow card) 84'	Report	McLaughlin (yellow card) 41'; Wallace (yellow card) 55'; Bacuna 70' (o.g.); Gregory 73'; Cooper (yellow card) 78'	Stadium: Madejski Stadium; Attendance: 17,282; Referee: Geoff Eltringham

9 February 2018 31	Millwall	1–1	Cardiff City	Bermondsey
17:45 GMT	Romeo (yellow card) 2'; Gregory 40'; Cooper (yellow card) 71'	Report	Hoilett 3'	Stadium: The Den; Attendance: Keith Stroud; Referee: 13,204

17 February 2018 32	Birmingham City	0–1	Millwall	Birmingham
15:00 GMT	Gallagher (yellow card) 26'; Kieftenbeld (yellow card) 56'	Report	Onyedinma 77'; Hutchinson (yellow card) 90+2'	Stadium: St Andrew's; Attendance: 19,111; Referee: Darren England

20 February 2018 33	Millwall	2–1	Sheffield Wednesday	Bermondsey
19:45 DST	Gregory 52'; Morison 63'	Report	Pelupessy 42', (yellow card) 90+11'; Venâncio (yellow card) 47'; Reach (yellow card) 76'; Nuhiu (yellow card) 90+7'	Stadium: The Den; Attendance: 11,007; Referee: Peter Bankes

24 February 2018 34	Burton Albion	0–1	Millwall	Burton upon trent
15:00 GMT		Report	Marshall 61'	Stadium: Pirelli Stadium; Attendance: 4,105; Referee: Robert Jones

3 March 2018 35	Millwall	1–1	Sunderland	Bermondsey
15:00 GMT	Hutchinson 69'; Saville (yellow card) 80'; Morison (yellow card) 90+6'	Report	Oviedo 29'; Steele (yellow card) 90+2'	Stadium: The Den; Attendance: 14,358; Referee: Andy Davies

6 March 2018 36	Hull City	1–2	Millwall	Kingston upon Hull
19:45 GMT	Dawson (yellow card) 36'; Henriksen (yellow card) 42'; Hernández 79'	Report	Saville 1'; Cooper 33'; Wallace (yellow card) 45'; Cahill (yellow card) 76'; Romeo (yellow card) 79'; Morison (yellow card) 85'	Stadium: KCOM Stadium; Attendance: 13,524; Referee: David Coote

10 March 2018 37	Millwall	1–0	Brentford	Bermondsey
15:00	Saville 1'; Elliott (yellow card) 75'; Cahill (yellow card) 88'	Report		Stadium: The Den; Attendance: 13,251

17 March 2018 38	Barnsley	0–2	Millwall	Yorkshire
15:00 GMT		Report	Gregory 24'; Marshall 63'	Stadium: Oakwell; Attendance: 13,041; Referee: Peter Bankes

30 March 2018 39	Millwall	2–0	Nottingham Forest	Bermondsey
13:00 BST	Williams 1', (yellow card) 40'; Saville (yellow card) 29'; Gregory 33'; Morison (yellow card) 53'	Report	Tomlin (yellow card) 12'; Pereira Figueiredo (yellow card) 23'; Fox (yellow card) 52'	Stadium: The Den; Attendance: 16,004; Referee: Scott Duncan

2 April 2018 40	Ipswich Town	2–2	Millwall	Ipswich
15:00	Waghorn 52', 54'; Carayol (yellow card) 61'; Spence (yellow card) 80'; Gleeson (yellow card) 82'; Waghorn (yellow card) 90'	Report	Cooper 27'; Saville 60'	Stadium: Portman Road; Attendance: 16,010; Referee: Steve Martin

7 April 2018 41	Millwall	2–0	Bristol City	Bermondsey
15:00				Stadium: The Den; Attendance: 16,081

10 April 2018 42	Bolton Wanderers	0–2	Millwall	Horwich
20:00 GMT		Report	Elliott 34'; Marshall 63'	Stadium: Macron Stadium; Attendance: 13,810; Referee: Robert Jones

14 April 2018 43	Sheffield United	1–1	Millwall	Sheffield
13:00 BST	Clarke 74'; Stearman (yellow card) 70'; L. Evans (yellow card) 90'	Report	Williams (yellow card) 45'; Marshall (yellow card) 75'; Morison 76'; Saville (yellow card) 81'	Stadium: Bramall Lane; Attendance: 27,454; Referee: David Coote

20 April 2018 44	Millwall	0–3	Fulham	Bermondsey
19:45	Hutchinson (yellow card) 62'; Wallace (yellow card) 82'; Cahill (yellow card) 88'; Gregory (yellow card) 90'	Report	Sessegnon 46'; McDonald 56'; Ream (yellow card) 71'; Mitrović 89'	Stadium: The Den; Attendance: 17,614; Referee: Andre Marriner

28 April 2018 45	Middlesbrough	2–0	Millwall	Middlesbrough
17:30	Assombalonga 11'; Friend (yellow card) 47'; Howson 66'; Bešić (yellow card) 85'	Report	Williams (yellow card) 45'; Hutchinson (yellow card) 87'; Tunnicliffe (yellow card) 90'	Stadium: Riverside Stadium; Attendance: 28,606; Referee: Paul Tierney

6 May 2018 46	Millwall	1–0	Aston Villa	Bermondsey
12:30				Stadium: The Den; Attendance: 17,195

=== FA Cup ===
In the FA Cup, Millwall entered the competition in the third round and were drawn at home against Barnsley.

6 January 2018 Third round	Millwall	4–1	Barnsley	Bermondsey
15:00 GMT	O'Brien 35', 56'; Thompson 47'; Onyedinma 61'	Report	Potts 11'; Cavaré (yellow card) 39'; Williams (yellow card) 52'; Gardner (yellow card) 81'	Stadium: The Den; Attendance: 5,319; Referee: Darren Bond

27 January 2018 Fourth round	Millwall	2–2	Rochdale	London
15:00 GMT	Wallace 17' (pen.); Thompson 90'	Report	Henderson 32'; Camps (yellow card) 35'; Andrew (yellow card) 52'; Done 53'	Stadium: The Den; Attendance: 8,346; Referee: Andrew Madley

6 February 2018 Fourth round replay	Rochdale	1–0	Millwall	Rochdale
19:45 GMT	Henderson 53'; Cannon (yellow card) 35'; Kitching (yellow card) 90+4'	Report	McLaughlin (yellow card) 85'	Stadium: Spotland Stadium; Attendance: 2,790; Referee: Tim Robinson

=== EFL Cup ===
On 16 June 2017, the first round draw took place with Stevenage the visitors confirmed. An away tie against Reading was announced for the second round.

8 August 2017 First round	Millwall	2–0	Stevenage	Bermondsey
19:45 BST	Elliott 54', 67'	Report		Stadium: The Den; Attendance: 3,096; Referee: Simon Hooper

22 August 2017 Second round	Reading	3–1 (a.e.t.)	Millwall	Reading
20:00 BST	Bacuna 34'; Evans 105'; Smith 116'	Report	Ferguson 37'	Stadium: Madejski Stadium; Attendance: 7,148; Referee: Charles Breakspear

== Squad ==
No.	Name	Pos.	Nat.	Place of Birth	Age	Apps	Goals	Signed from	Date signed	Fee	Ends
Goalkeepers
1	Jordan Archer	GK	(Scotland) (England)	Walthamstow	33	124	0	Tottenham Hotspur	22 June 2015	Free	2019
13	Tom King	GK	(England)	Croydon	31	17	0	Crystal Palace	31 August 2014	Free	2019
16	David Martin	GK	(England)	London	40	3	0	Milton Keynes Dons	1 September 2017	Free	2018
40	Ryan Sandford	GK	(England)		27	0	0	Academy	1 July 2017	Trainee	2018
Defenders
2	Conor McLaughlin	RB	(Northern Ireland)	Belfast	35	23	1	Fleetwood Town	5 July 2017	Free	2019
3	James Meredith	LB	(Australia)	Albury	38	31	0	Bradford City	1 July 2017	Undisclosed	2019
4	Shaun Hutchinson	CB	(England)	Newcastle upon Tyne	35	52	2	Fulham	1 July 2016	Free	2018
12	Mahlon Romeo	RB	(Antigua and Barbuda) (England)	Westminster	31	72	2	Gillingham	5 May 2015	Free	2019
17	Byron Webster	CB	(England)	Sherburn-in-Elmet	39	130	8	Yeovil Town	1 July 2014	Free	2018
24	Jason Shackell	CB	(England)	Stevenage	43	3	0	Derby County	25 January 2018	Loan	2018
35	Jake Cooper	CB	(England)	Ascot	31	45	4	Reading	28 July 2017	Undisclosed	2020
36	Harry Toffolo	LB	(England)	Welwyn Garden City	31	0	0	Norwich City	29 January 2018	Undisclosed	2018
Midfielders
6	Shaun Williams	DM	(Republic of Ireland)	Dublin	39	177	12	Milton Keynes Dons	27 January 2014	Undisclosed	2018
8	Ben Thompson	CM	(England)	Sidcup	31	90	4	Academy	1 July 2014	Trainee	Undisclosed
10	Fred Onyedinma	AM	(Nigeria) (England)	Plumstead	29	132	13	Academy	1 July 2013	Trainee	2020
11	Shane Ferguson	LM	(Northern Ireland)	Derry	35	120	8	Newcastle United	26 January 2016	Undisclosed	2019
14	Jed Wallace	RM/AM	(England)	Reading	32	65	10	Wolverhampton Wanderers	1 July 2017	Undisclosed	2020
18	Ryan Tunnicliffe	CM	(England)	Heywood	33	24	1	Fulham	29 July 2017	Free	2019
23	George Saville	DM	(Northern Ireland) (England)	Camberley	33	50	7	Wolverhampton Wanderers	1 July 2017	Undisclosed	2020
32	Dan McNamara	MF	(England)		27	0	0	Academy	1 July 2018	Trainee	2018
34	Harry Donovan	CM	(England)	London	27	0	0	Academy	10 February 2017	Trainee	2018
37	Lewis White	MF	(England)		27	0	0	Academy	1 July 2017	Trainee	2018
44	Ben Marshall	RW	(England)	Salford	35	2	0	Wolverhampton Wanderers	31 January 2018	Loan	2018
Forwards
7	Tim Cahill	SS	(Australia)	Sydney	46	251	56	Free agent	29 January 2018	Free	2018
9	Lee Gregory	CF	(England)	Sheffield	38	171	61	Halifax Town	17 June 2014	£250,000	2018
19	Tom Elliott	CF	(England)	Leeds	35	19	5	AFC Wimbledon	1 July 2017	Free	2019
20	Steve Morison	CF	(Wales) (England)	Enfield	43	275	88	Leeds United	4 August 2015	Free	2018
22	Aiden O'Brien	CF	(Republic of Ireland) (England)	Islington	33	173	36	Academy	1 August 2011	Trainee	2019
28	Jamie Philpot	CF	(England)	Pembury	30	13	1	Academy	1 July 2014	Trainee	Undisclosed
29	Noel Leighton	CF	(England)		28	0	0	Academy	1 July 2017	Trainee	2018
Out on loan
15	Sid Nelson	CB	(England)	Lewisham	30	38	0	Academy	1 July 2013	Trainee	2018
21	Kris Twardek	LM	(Canada) (Czech Republic)	Toronto	29	5	0	Academy	1 July 2015	Trainee	Undisclosed
26	Jimmy Abdou	CM	(Comoros) (France)	Martigues	42	342	10	Plymouth Argyle	3 July 2008	Free	2018
27	James Brown	DF	(England)	Dover	28	0	0	Academy	7 April 2016	Trainee	Undisclosed
30	Harry Smith	CF	(England)		31	11	6	Folkestone Invicta	9 August 2016	Undisclosed	2018
33	Noah Chesmain	LB	(England)		28	3	0	Academy	1 July 2015	Trainee	Undisclosed

=== Statistics ===
As of 20 April 2018

No.	Pos	Nat	Player	Total		Championship		FA Cup		League Cup	
No.	Pos	Nat	Player	Apps	Goals	Apps	Goals	Apps	Goals	Apps	Goals
1	GK	(Scotland) SCO	Jordan Archer	43	0	43	0	0	0	0	0
2	DF	(Northern Ireland) NIR	Conor McLaughlin	24	1	23	1	1	0	0	0
3	DF	(Australia) AUS	James Meredith	44	0	44	0	0	0	0	0
4	DF	(England) ENG	Shaun Hutchinson	45	2	44	2	1	0	0	0
6	MF	(Republic of Ireland) IRL	Shaun Williams	37	2	28+5	2	1+1	0	0+2	0
7	FW	(Australia) AUS	Tim Cahill	10	0	0+10	0	0	0	0	0
8	MF	(England) ENG	Ben Thompson	7	2	0+3	0	2	2	2	0
9	FW	(England) ENG	Lee Gregory	44	10	39+2	10	0+2	0	0+1	0
10	MF	(Nigeria) NGR	Fred Onyedinma	40	2	7+29	1	2	1	2	0
11	MF	(Northern Ireland) NIR	Shane Ferguson	25	1	9+13	0	1	0	2	1
12	DF	(Antigua and Barbuda) ANT	Mahlon Romeo	30	1	21+5	1	1+1	0	2	0
13	GK	(England) ENG	Tom King	2	0	0	0	0	0	2	0
14	MF	(England) ENG	Jed Wallace	44	7	40+1	6	2	1	0+1	0
16	GK	(England) ENG	David Martin	3	0	1	0	2	0	0	0
17	DF	(England) ENG	Byron Webster	11	0	10	0	0	0	1	0
18	MF	(England) ENG	Ryan Tunnicliffe	24	1	17+5	1	1	0	1	0
19	FW	(England) ENG	Tom Elliott	26	6	8+15	4	1	0	2	2
20	FW	(Wales) WAL	Steve Morison	45	5	36+6	5	1+1	0	0+1	0
22	FW	(Republic of Ireland) IRL	Aiden O'Brien	31	6	22+7	4	1	2	0+1	0
23	MF	(Northern Ireland) NIR	George Saville	44	10	43	10	0	0	1	0
24	DF	(England) ENG	Jason Shackell	8	0	0+7	0	1	0	0	0
35	DF	(England) ENG	Jake Cooper	39	4	33+3	4	1	0	2	0
44	MF	(England) ENG	Ben Marshall	14	3	14	3	0	0	0	0
Player(s) out on loan:
21	MF	(Canada) CAN	Kris Twardek	3	0	0+2	0	0+1	0	0+0	0
Player(s) left the club:
5	DF	(England) ENG	Tony Craig	8	0	1+3	0	2+0	0	2+0	0
16	MF	(England) ENG	Calum Butcher	2	0	0+0	0	0+0	0	1+1	0

=== Goals record ===
As of 17 February 2018

Rank	No.	Nat.	Po.	Name	Championship	FA Cup	League Cup	Total
1	9	(England)	CF	Lee Gregory	7	0	0	7
1	23	(Northern Ireland)	CM	George Saville	7	0	0	7
3	14	(England)	RM	Jed Wallace	5	1	0	6
3	22	(Republic of Ireland)	CF	Aiden O'Brien	4	2	0	6
5	19	(England)	CF	Tom Elliott	3	0	2	5
6	8	(England)	CM	Ben Thompson	0	2	0	2
6	10	(Nigeria)	AM	Fred Onyedinma	1	1	0	2
6	20	(Wales)	CF	Steve Morison	2	0	0	2
6	35	(England)	CB	Jake Cooper	2	0	0	2
10	2	(Northern Ireland)	RB	Conor McLaughlin	1	0	0	1
10	11	(Northern Ireland)	LM	Shane Ferguson	0	0	1	1
10	12	(Antigua and Barbuda)	RB	Mahlon Romeo	1	0	0	1
10	18	(England)	CM	Ryan Tunnicliffe	1	0	0	1
Own Goals					1	0	0	1
Total					35	6	2	43

=== Disciplinary record ===
As of 17 February 2018

Rank	No.	Nat.	Po.	Name	Championship			FA Cup			League Cup			Total		
Rank	No.	Nat.	Po.	Name	Booked	(yellow card) (yellow-red card)	Sent off (straight red)	Booked	(yellow card) (yellow-red card)	Sent off (straight red)	Booked	(yellow card) (yellow-red card)	Sent off (straight red)	Booked	(yellow card) (yellow-red card)	Sent off (straight red)
1	14	(England)	RM	Jed Wallace	7	0	1	0	0	0	0	0	0	7	0	1
2	2	(Northern Ireland)	RB	Conor McLaughlin	7	0	0	0	0	0	0	0	0	7	0	0
2	35	(England)	CB	Jake Cooper	5	1	0	0	0	0	0	0	0	5	1	0
4	4	(England)	CB	Shaun Hutchinson	5	0	0	0	0	0	0	0	0	5	0	0
4	23	(Northern Ireland)	CM	George Saville	5	0	0	0	0	0	0	0	0	5	0	0
6	3	(Australia)	LB	James Meredith	4	0	0	0	0	0	0	0	0	4	0	0
6	9	(England)	CF	Lee Gregory	2	0	1	0	0	0	0	0	0	2	0	1
8	6	(Republic of Ireland)	DM	Shaun Williams	2	0	0	0	0	0	0	0	0	2	0	0
8	11	(Northern Ireland)	LM	Shane Ferguson	2	0	0	0	0	0	0	0	0	2	0	0
8	12	(Antigua and Barbuda)	RB	Mahlon Romeo	2	0	0	0	0	0	0	0	0	2	0	0
8	17	(England)	CB	Byron Webster	2	0	0	0	0	0	0	0	0	2	0	0
8	18	(England)	CM	Ryan Tunnicliffe	2	0	0	0	0	0	0	0	0	2	0	0
8	20	(Wales)	CF	Steve Morison	2	0	0	0	0	0	0	0	0	2	0	0
8	22	(Northern Ireland)	CF	Aiden O'Brien	1	1	0	0	0	0	0	0	0	1	1	0
15	1	(Scotland)	GK	Jordan Archer	1	0	0	0	0	0	0	0	0	1	0	0
15	19	(England)	CF	Tom Elliott	1	0	0	0	0	0	0	0	0	1	0	0
Total					49	2	2	0	0	0	0	0	0	49	2	2

== Transfers ==
=== Transfers in ===
Date from	Position	Nationality	Name	From	Fee	Ref.
1 July 2017	CF	(England)	Tom Elliott	AFC Wimbledon	Free	
1 July 2017	LB	(Australia)	James Meredith	Bradford City	Free	
1 July 2017	CM	(England)	George Saville	Wolverhampton Wanderers	Undisclosed	
1 July 2017	RM	(England)	Jed Wallace	Wolverhampton Wanderers	Undisclosed	
5 July 2017	RB	(Northern Ireland)	Conor McLaughlin	Fleetwood Town	Free	
28 July 2017	CB	(England)	Jake Cooper	Reading	Undisclosed	
29 July 2017	CM	(England)	Ryan Tunnicliffe	Fulham	Free	
31 August 2017	CF	(Australia)	Kristian Brymora	Newcastle Jets	Free	
1 September 2017	GK	(England)	David Martin	Milton Keynes Dons	Free	
29 January 2018	LB	(England)	Harry Toffolo	Norwich City	Undisclosed	
29 January 2018	SS	(Australia)	Tim Cahill	Free agent	Free	

=== Loans in ===
Start date	Position	Nationality	Name	From	End date	Ref.
25 January 2018	CB	(England)	Jason Shackell	Derby County	30 June 2018	
31 January 2018	RW	(England)	Ben Marshall	Wolverhampton Wanderers	30 June 2018	

=== Transfers out ===
Date from	Position	Nationality	Name	To	Fee	Ref.
1 July 2017	CB	(England)	Rian Bray	Free agent	Released	
1 July 2017	CM	(Republic of Ireland)	Kyron Farrell	Concord Rangers	Released	(Note: Kyron Farrell joined Concord Rangers following his release.)
1 July 2017	GK	(Republic of Ireland)	David Forde	Cambridge United	Released	(Note: David Forde joined Cambridge United following his release.)
1 July 2017	LB	(England)	Joe Martin	Stevenage	Released	(Note: Joe Martin joined Stevange following his release.)
1 July 2017	CF	(England)	Alfie Pavey	Free agent	Released	
1 July 2017	LM	(Scotland)	Gregg Wylde	Plymouth Argyle	Free	
9 August 2017	RB	(Jamaica)	Shaun Cummings	Rotherham United	Free	
22 August 2017	RM	(England)	David Worrall	Port Vale	Mutual consent	(Note: David Worrall joined Port Vale following his release.)
31 August 2017	DM	(England)	Calum Butcher	Mansfield Town	Mutual consent	(Note: Calum Butcher joined Mansfield Town following his departure.)
24 January 2018	CB	(Republic of Ireland)	Paul Rooney	Colchester United	Undisclosed	
31 January 2018	CB	(England)	Tony Craig	Bristol Rovers	Free	

=== Loans out ===
Start date	Position	Nationality	Name	To	End date	Ref.
7 July 2017	GK	(England)	Harry Girling	Leatherhead	3 January 2018	
12 July 2017	CF	(England)	Harry Smith	Swindon Town	30 June 2018	
15 July 2017	CM	(Comoros)	Jimmy Abdou	AFC Wimbledon	30 June 2018	
3 August 2017	CF	(England)	Jamie Philpot	Woking	October 2017	
21 August 2017	CB	(England)	Sid Nelson	Yeovil Town	1 January 2018	
25 August 2017	CB	(England)	James Brown	Carlisle United	1 January 2018	
24 November 2017	GK	(England)	Ryan Sandford	Welling United	24 December 2017	
4 January 2018	GK	(England)	Tom King	Stevenage	30 June 2018	
4 January 2018	CB	(England)	Sid Nelson	Chesterfield	30 June 2018	
26 January 2018	RM	(Canada)	Kris Twardek	Carlisle United	30 June 2018	
