= Tony Craig =

English footballer (born 1985)

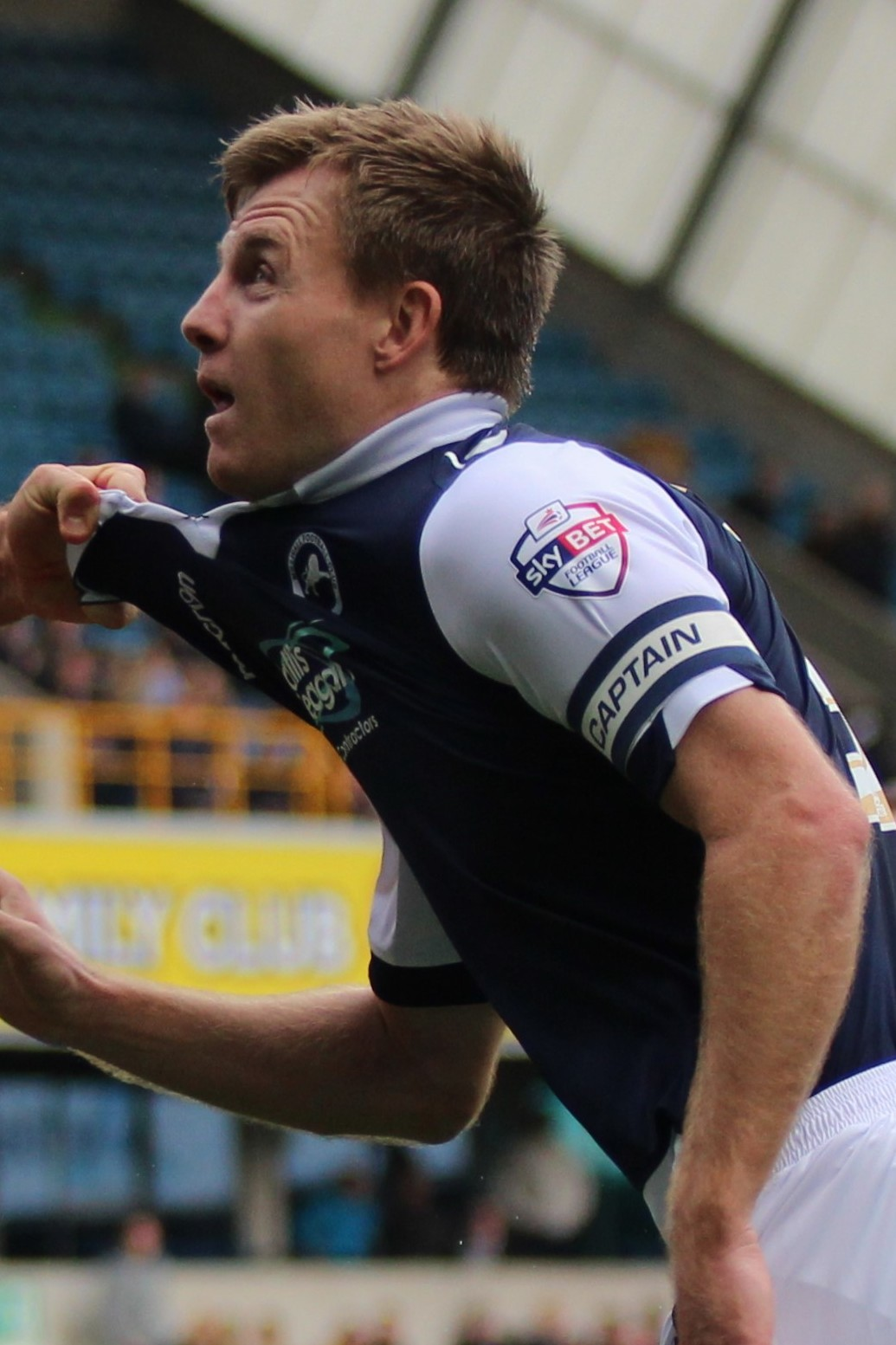
- Craig playing for Millwall in October 2015

Personal information
- Full name: Tony Andrew Craig
- Date of birth: 20 April 1985 (age 41)
- Place of birth: Greenwich, England
- Height: 6 ft 0 in (1.83 m)
- Positions: Central defender; left back

Team information
- Current team: Tonbridge Angels (first-team coach)

Youth career
- –2003: Millwall

Senior career*
Years	Team	Apps	(Gls)
2003–2007	Millwall	79	(2)
2004–2005	→ Wycombe Wanderers (loan)	14	(0)
2007–2008	Crystal Palace	13	(0)
2008	→ Millwall (loan)	5	(1)
2008–2012	Millwall	121	(4)
2011	→ Leyton Orient (loan)	4	(0)
2012–2015	Brentford	111	(0)
2015–2018	Millwall	65	(2)
2018–2020	Bristol Rovers	97	(5)
2020–2023	Crawley Town	89	(1)
2023	→ Dorking Wanderers (loan)	16	(0)
2023–2026	Dorking Wanderers	110	(1)
Total		724	(16)
- * Club domestic league appearances and goals

Tony Andrew Craig (born 20 April 1985) is an English former professional footballer who played as a central defender. He is currently a first-team coach of National League South club Tonbridge Angels.

Craig began his career at Millwall and made over 320 appearances across four spells with the club. In a League career lasting 20 years, Craig also played for Brentford, Bristol Rovers, Crystal Palace, Wycombe Wanderers and Leyton Orient. He dropped into non-League football to join Dorking Wanderers in 2023, for whom he played until his retirement as a player at the end of the 2025–26 season. Craig made more than 800 appearances during his playing career.

== Playing career ==
=== Millwall ===
==== 2003–2004 ====
Craig began his career in the youth ranks at Millwall, the club he supports. Adept as a central defender or a left back, he received his maiden call into the first team squad for a First Division league match against Bradford City on 5 April 2003 and was an unused substitute during the 1–0 win. Craig made his professional debut with a starting appearance in a 3–3 draw with Nottingham Forest on 26 April 2003 and lasted 67 minutes before being substituted for Robbie Ryan. He started in the final game of the 2002–03 season at home to Coventry City and scored the first senior goal of his career in the 2–0 win, with the opener on 51 minutes. Craig began the 2003–04 season as a virtual ever-present, making 10 appearances, before dropping out of the matchday squad entirely in October 2003.

==== 2004–05 season ====
Craig was again out of favour with manager Dennis Wise during the 2004–05 season and joined League Two club Wycombe Wanderers on a one-month loan on 22 October 2004, which was later extended to 22 January 2005. He made 18 appearances for the Chairboys. Craig made 10 Millwall appearances during the second half of the 2004–05 season.

==== 2005–2007 ====
Under new manager Colin Lee, Craig made sporadic appearances during the opening two months of the 2005–06 season, before cementing a regular place in the team in late 2005 under replacement manager Dave Tuttle. Despite getting two red cards, Craig finished the 2005–06 season with 33 appearances, but began the 2006–07 season in League One after Millwall's relegation. Craig had a suspension and injury-affect first half of the 2006–07 season, but was a regular pick after the New Year and finished the campaign with 32 appearances and one goal, which was scored on the final day versus Bradford City. Craig departed the club in June 2007, having made 87 appearances and scored two goals in his four years as a first team player.

=== Crystal Palace ===
On 27 June 2007, Craig joined Championship club Crystal Palace on a three-year contract for an undisclosed fee. He started 13 of the Eagles' opening 14 games, but a shoulder injury suffered in a 0–0 draw with Scunthorpe United on 3 November 2007 put him out of action for the next four months. Upon his return to fitness, Craig returned to Millwall, still in League One, on a one-month loan on 27 March 2008. He made five appearances and scored against Carlisle United in the final match of his spell, before returning to Crystal Palace on 27 April. He departed Selhurst Park in July 2008.

=== Return to Millwall ===
==== 2008–09 season ====
Craig signed permanently for the second time with Millwall on 11 July 2008, on a three-year contract for an undisclosed fee. He made a personal-best 52 appearances during the 2008–09 season, scoring two goals and helping Millwall to a place at Wembley Stadium for the 2009 League One play-off final versus Scunthorpe United. Goals from Gary Alexander put the Lions 2–1 ahead, but second-half strikes from Matt Sparrow and Martyn Woolford sent Scunthorpe to the Championship.

==== 2009–10 season ====
Craig was in and out of the team during the 2009–10 season and could not hold down a regular place until December 2009. In the absence of Paul Robinson, Craig took over the captaincy. He made 35 appearances and scored two goals to help Millwall to the play-off final for the second season in succession. Though Craig was forced off with a broken metatarsal on 44 minutes, Millwall prevailed in the 2010 League One play-off final and were promoted to the Championship after a 1–0 win over Swindon Town.

==== 2010–2012 ====
Craig had a mixed 2010–11 season back in the Championship, having spells as a starter through the middle of the campaign and finishing with 26 appearances. Craig began the 2011–12 season as a regular starter, but fell out of favour and joined League One club Leyton Orient on a one-month loan on 24 November 2011, as cover for the departed Charlie Daniels. Craig made four appearances for Orient and was recalled by Millwall on 28 December, but he didn't reclaim his starting position until the final month of the season. Craig left The Den in July 2012, having made 141 appearances and scored four goals during his third stint with the club.

=== Brentford ===
==== 2012–13 season ====
On 13 July 2012, Craig transferred to League One club Brentford on 13 July 2012 on a three-year contract for an undisclosed fee. In Craig's first season with Brentford, he appeared in all but four of the Bees' matches and finished with 55 appearances. The season ended with defeat to Yeovil Town in the 2013 League One play-off final. Looking back in 2023, Craig stated that due to "how the full-back game was progressing; how there was a lot more forward play and they were better on the ball", he was eager to transition to centre back. Playing in a possession-based team, he asserted that his improvement on the ball helped prolong his post-Brentford career.

==== 2013–14 season ====
After missing the first match of the 2013–14 season through an ankle knock, Craig was again an ever-present starter until he received a red card during a 0–0 draw with Carlisle United on 31 August 2013. After serving his suspension, Craig returned to the starting lineup and despite breaking two bones in his hand during a 2–1 victory over Gillingham on 24 January 2014, he saw out the match and played the subsequent matches with his hand in a cast. Craig held the captaincy for much of the season (in place of the injured Kevin O'Connor) and jointly lifted the League One runners-up trophy with O'Connor after the final game of the season against Stevenage on 3 May. He was voted the Brentford Players' Player of the Year for the 2013–14 season.

==== 2014–15 season ====
Craig began the 2014–15 Championship season alongside James Tarkowski in central defence and started each of the club's first five games, before receiving his first red card of the season on 23 August 2014, for bringing down former teammate Clayton Donaldson in the box after 16 minutes of a 1–1 draw with Birmingham City. While suspended, Craig was replaced by Harlee Dean in the starting lineup and lost his place in the team for the first time since arriving at Griffin Park. He signed a new 2 1/2-year contract on 11 November, but again lost his starting place to Dean in January 2015 and fell out of the squad entirely when Liam Moore arrived on loan in late February. After Moore was dropped in early March, Craig returned to the bench, but did not appear again before the end of the season. Craig finished the 2014–15 season with 24 appearances and departed Griffin Park on 4 July 2015, when his contract was terminated by mutual consent. Craig made 129 appearances during three seasons with Brentford.

=== Fourth spell with Millwall ===
On 4 July 2015, it was announced that Craig had dropped back down to League One to sign a two-year contract with newly-relegated Millwall on a free transfer. He began the 2015–16 season as a regular, before suffering a serious knee injury during a 0–0 draw with Bradford City on 31 October 2015. He returned to fitness in April 2016 and appeared in each of the Lions' play-off matches, but was on the end of another Wembley defeat in the final versus Barnsley.

Craig was awarded a testimonial versus Brentford during the 2016–17 pre-season, which finished in a 1–1 draw. Craig made a career-high 57 appearances during the 2016–17 season and played in a second-successive play-off final, in which he captained the Lions to promotion to the Championship with a 1–0 victory over Bradford City. He made just eight appearances during the first half of the 2017–18 season, before departing The Den for the final time on 31 January 2018. Across his four spells with Millwall, Craig made 324 appearances and scored 9 goals.

=== Bristol Rovers ===
On 1 February 2018, Craig moved to League One club Bristol Rovers on a free transfer. Over the course of the following 2 1/2-years, Craig was a near ever-present and made 120 appearances, scoring seven goals. He was released at the end of the 2019–20 season.

=== Crawley Town ===
On 1 August 2020, Craig signed a two-year contract with League Two club Crawley Town on a free transfer. He made 82 appearances and scored one goal during two mid-table seasons and signed a new two-year contract in April 2022. Craig was again a regular during the first half of the 2022–23 season, before being dropped from the matchday squad at the turn of the year. After playing the remainder of the season away on loan, he agreed a mutual termination of his contract June 2023. During three seasons at the Broadfield Stadium, Craig made 102 appearances and scored eight goals.

=== Dorking Wanderers ===
On 13 February 2023, Craig joined National League club Dorking Wanderers on loan until the end of the 2022–23 season. Craig's performances during the remainder of February saw him named the club's Player of the Month. He made 16 appearances during his spell and signed a two-year contract with the club on 2 June 2023. Craig made 36 appearances and scored one goal during a 2023–24 season that culminated in relegation to the National League South. Craig made 50 appearances during a 2024–25 season in which the club reached the National League South playoff quarter finals and the Surrey Senior Cup Final. He shared the club's Players' Player of the Year award with Jimmy Muitt and was retained for the 2025–26 season. Craig made more than 30 appearances during the 2025–26 season, prior to suffering a season-ending fractured fibula during a match on Good Friday 2026. Craig retired as a player with immediate effect and ended his career with the club on 135 appearances and one goal.

== Coaching career ==
Craig obtained a UEFA A Licence while a player with Bristol Rovers. During the 2019–20 season, he assisted with the coaching of Bristol Rovers' U15 and U23 teams. As of June 2026, he had been assisting with the coaching of Millwall's U16 team for three years. In June 2026, Craig joined the coaching staff of National League South club Tonbridge Angels, assisting manager Alan Dunne, a former Millwall teammate.

== Personal life ==
Craig was born in Greenwich and grew up in Thamesmead. He is a Millwall supporter.

== Career statistics ==
Appearances and goals by club, season and competition
Club	Season	League			National cup (Note: Includes FA Cup)		League cup (Note: Includes EFL Cup)		Other		Total	
Club	Season	Division	Apps	Goals	Apps	Goals	Apps	Goals	Apps	Goals	Apps	Goals
Millwall	2002–03	First Division	2	1	0	0	0	0	—		2	1
Millwall	2003–04	First Division	9	0	0	0	1	0	—		10	0
Millwall	2004–05	Championship	10	0	—		0	0	—		10	0
Millwall	2005–06	Championship	28	0	2	0	3	0	—		33	0
Millwall	2006–07	League One	30	1	0	0	1	0	1 (Note: Appearance(s) in EFL Trophy)	0	32	1
Millwall	Total		79	2	2	0	5	0	1	0	87	2
Wycombe Wanderers (loan)	2004–05	League Two	14	0	2	0	—		2	0	18	0
Crystal Palace	2007–08	Championship	13	0	0	0	1	0	—		14	0
Millwall (loan)	2007–08	League One	5	1	—		—		—		5	1
Millwall	2008–09	League One	44	2	3	0	1	0	4 (Note: 3 appearances in League One play-offs, 1 appearance in EFL Trophy)	0	52	2
Millwall	2009–10	League One	30	2	2	0	0	0	3 (Note: Appearances in League One play-offs)	0	35	2
Millwall	2010–11	Championship	24	0	1	0	1	0	—		26	0
Millwall	2011–12	Championship	23	0	2	0	3	0	—		28	0
Millwall	Total		121	4	8	0	5	0	7	0	146	5
Leyton Orient (loan)	2011–12	League One	4	0	0	0	—		—		4	0
Brentford	2012–13	League One	44	0	7	0	1	0	3 (Note: 2 appearances in League One play-offs, 1 appearance in EFL Trophy)	0	55	0
Brentford	2013–14	League One	44	0	4	0	1	0	1	0	50	0
Brentford	2014–15	Championship	23	0	0	0	1	0	0	0	24	0
Brentford	Total		111	0	11	0	3	0	4	0	129	0
Millwall	2015–16	League One	18	1	0	0	1	0	5 (Note: 3 appearances in League One play-offs, 2 appearances in EFL Trophy)	0	24	1
Millwall	2016–17	League One	43	1	6	0	1	0	7 (Note: 4 appearances in EFL Trophy, 3 appearances in League One play-offs)	0	57	1
Millwall	2017–18	Championship	4	0	2	0	2	0	—		8	0
Millwall	Total		270	9	20	0	14	0	20	0	324	9
Bristol Rovers	2017–18	League One	17	1	—		—		—		17	1
Bristol Rovers	2018–19	League One	46	2	2	0	2	0	3	1	53	3
Bristol Rovers	2019–20	League One	34	2	6	1	1	0	4	0	45	3
Bristol Rovers	Total		97	5	8	1	3	0	7	1	120	7
Crawley Town	2020–21	League Two	38	0	3	0	1	0	0	0	42	0
Crawley Town	2021–22	League Two	35	1	1	0	1	0	3	0	40	1
Crawley Town	2022–23	League Two	16	0	1	0	1	0	2	0	20	0
Crawley Town	Total		89	1	5	0	3	0	5	0	102	8
Dorking Wanderers (loan)	2022–23	National League	16	0	—		—		—		16	0
Dorking Wanderers	2023–24	National League	35	1	0	0	—		1 (Note: Appearance in FA Trophy)	0	36	1
Dorking Wanderers	2024–25	National League South	45	0	1	0	—		4 (Note: 2 appearances in Surrey Senior Cup, 1 appearance in National League South play-offs, 1 appearance in FA Trophy)	0	50	0
Dorking Wanderers	2025–26	National League South	30	0	1	0	—		2	0	33	0
Dorking Wanderers	Total		126	1	2	0	—		7	0	135	1
Career total			724	16	48	1	24	0	45	1	849	18

== Honours ==
Millwall

- Football League One play-offs: 2010, 2017

Brentford

- Football League One second-place promotion: 2013–14

Individual

- Brentford Players' Player of the Year: 2013–14
- Dorking Wanderers Players' Player of the Year: 2024–25 (shared)
