= Noah Chesmain =

English footballer

Personal information
- Full name: Noah Litchfield Chesmain
- Date of birth: 16 December 1997 (age 28)
- Place of birth: Waltham Forest, London, England
- Height: 1.75 m (5 ft 9 in)
- Position: Defender

Team information
- Current team: Maidstone United

Youth career
- 2014–2016: Millwall

Senior career*
Years	Team	Apps	(Gls)
2015–2018	Millwall	1	(0)
2016	→ Welling United (loan)	12	(0)
2017	→ Boreham Wood (loan)	3	(0)
2018–2019	Colchester United	0	(0)
2018–2019	→ Hitchin Town (loan)	31	(1)
2019	→ Hungerford Town (loan)	6	(1)
2019–2021	Maidstone United	29	(0)
- * Club domestic league appearances and goals as of 09:16, 13 May 2019 (UTC)

Noah Litchfield Chesmain (born 16 December 1997) is an English professional footballer who plays as a defender, for Maidstone United.

He came through the youth system at Millwall, beginning his scholarship in 2014, before making his professional debut in November 2015. He then had a loan spell at National League sides Welling United in 2016, and then Boreham Wood in late 2017. He was released by Millwall at the end of his contract in 2018 before signing for Colchester United. He joined Hitchin Town on loan in August 2018, and then Hungerford Town on loan in March 2019. He was released by Colchester in summer 2019.

== Career ==
=== Millwall ===
Born in Waltham Forest, London, Chesmain signed as a scholar with Millwall in June 2014. He made his debut for the club on 28 November 2015 when he came on for Shane Ferguson 83-minutes into a 1–0 win over Bury at The Den.

After becoming a regular in Millwall's under-23 squad, Chesmain experienced competitive football on loan with Welling United in January through March 2016, where he made 12 appearances in the National League. He also had a loan spell with Boreham Wood in late 2017.

He was released by Millwall at the end of the 2017–18 season.

=== Colchester United ===
Following a successful trial in the latter stages of the 2017–18 season, on 25 May 2018, Chesmain signed a pre-contract agreement with League Two club Colchester United on a one-year deal.

Chesmain signed for Southern League Premier Division Central side Hitchin Town in an initial month-long loan deal on 21 August 2018. He made his debut on 25 August in Hitchin's 1–0 win over Redditch United, providing the assist for the goal. He scored his first goal in senior football on 16 February 2019 with the only goal in Hitchin's 1–0 win at Barwell.

Chesmain joined National League South side Hungerford Town on loan in March 2019.

On 14 May 2019, it was announced Chesmain was to leave Colchester United at the end of his contract having failed to make a first-team appearance for the club.

== Career statistics ==
As of match played 27 April 2019

Appearances and goals by club, season and competition
Club	Season	League			FA Cup		League Cup		Other		Total	
Club	Season	Division	Apps	Goals	Apps	Goals	Apps	Goals	Apps	Goals	Apps	Goals
Millwall	2015–16	League One	1	0	0	0	0	0	0	0	1	0
Millwall	2016–17	League One	0	0	0	0	0	0	2 (Note: Appearances in EFL Trophy)	0	2	0
Millwall	2017–18	Championship	0	0	0	0	0	0	–		0	0
Millwall	Total		1	0	0	0	0	0	2	0	3	0
Welling United (loan)	2015–16	National League	12	0	0	0	–		0	0	12	0
Boreham Wood (loan)	2017–18	National League	3	0	0	0	–		0	0	3	0
Colchester United	2018–19	League Two	0	0	0	0	0	0	0	0	0	0
Hitchin Town (loan)	2018–19	Southern League Premier Division Central	31	1	5	0	–		7 (Note: Appearances in Southern League Cup) (Note: Appearance in FA Trophy) (Note: Appearances in Herts Senior Cup) (Note: Appearance in Herts Charity Cup)	0	43	1
Hungerford Town (loan)	2018–19	National League South	6	1	–		–		–		6	1
Career total			53	2	5	0	0	0	9	0	67	2
