= 2016–17 Millwall F.C. season =

Millwall F.C.
2016–17 season
- Chairman: John Berylson
- Manager: Neil Harris
- Stadium: The Den
- League One: 6th (promoted via playoffs)
- FA Cup: Quarter-final (eliminated by Tottenham Hotspur)
- EFL Cup: Second round (eliminated by Nottingham Forest)
- EFL Trophy: Second round (eliminated by Wycombe Wanderers)
- Top goalscorer: League: Lee Gregory (17); All: Steve Morison (19)
- Highest home attendance: 18,012 vs. Leicester City, FA Cup, 18 February 2017
- Lowest home attendance: 4,009 vs. Nottingham Forest, EFL Cup, 23 August 2016
- Average home league attendance: 8,723
| Home colours | Away colours | Third colours |

The 2016–17 season is Millwall's 132nd year in existence, 91st consecutive season in The Football League and 43rd in the third tier. Along with competing in League One, the club participated in the FA Cup, League Cup and Football League Trophy. Millwall qualified for the playoffs for the second successive year, securing sixth place on the last day of the season in a 4–3 win away at Bristol Rovers. After beating Scunthorpe United 3–2 in the semi-final, Millwall gained promotion back to The Championship, beating Bradford City 1–0 in the final with a Steve Morison goal in the 85th minute.

Millwall also knocked out three Premier League teams on the way to reaching the FA Cup Quarter-final for the tenth time in their history, where they were knocked out by Tottenham. The season covers the period from 1 July 2016 to 30 June 2017.

== Competitions ==
=== Pre-season friendlies ===
| 16 July 2016 Friendly | Bromley | 1–2 | Millwall | Bromley |
| 15:00 BST | | Report | Onyedinma 3'; Gregory 27' | Stadium: Bromley; Attendance: - |

| 19 July 2016 Friendly | Dartford | 0–3 | Millwall | Dartford |
| 19:45 BST | | Report | Onyedinma 10'; O'Brien 17'; Philpot 80' | Stadium: Princes Park; Attendance: 1,407; Referee: Charles Breakspear |

| 19 July 2016 Friendly | Crawley Town | 2–3 | Millwall | Crawley |
| 15:00 BST | | Report | Gregory 16'; Williams 67'; Morison 86' | Stadium: Broadfield; Attendance: 1,278 (away 489); Referee: Tim Robinson |

| 26 July 2016 Friendly | Dover Athletic | 2–0 | Millwall | Dover |
| 19:30 BST | Miller 61'; Grimes 81' | Report | | Stadium: Crabble Athletic Ground; Attendance: 866; Referee: Lee Venamore |

| 30 July 2016 Friendly | Millwall | 1–1 | Brentford | South Bermondsey |
| 15:00 BST | Morison 27' | Report | Barbet 8' | Stadium: The Den; Referee: Andy Woolmer |

=== League One ===
==== League table ====
| Pos | Team | Pld | W | D | L | GF | GA | GD | Pts | Promotion, qualification or relegation |
|---|---|---|---|---|---|---|---|---|---|---|
| 4 | Fleetwood Town | 46 | 23 | 13 | 10 | 64 | 43 | +21 | 82 | Qualification for the League One play-offs (Note: Four teams play for one spot and promotion to the EFL Championship.) |
| 5 | Bradford City | 46 | 20 | 19 | 7 | 62 | 43 | +19 | 79 | Qualification for the League One play-offs |
| 6 | Millwall (O, P) | 46 | 20 | 13 | 13 | 66 | 57 | +9 | 73 | Qualification for the League One play-offs |
| 7 | Southend United | 46 | 20 | 12 | 14 | 70 | 53 | +17 | 72 | |
| 8 | Oxford United | 46 | 20 | 9 | 17 | 65 | 52 | +13 | 69 | |

Source: BBC Sport
Rules for classification: 1) Points; 2) Goal difference; 3) Number of goals scored
(O) Play-off winners; (P) Promoted

==== Results summary ====
| Overall | | | | | | | | Home | | | | | | Away | | | | | |
| Pld | W | D | L | GF | GA | GD | Pts | W | D | L | GF | GA | GD | W | D | L | GF | GA | GD |
|---|---|---|---|---|---|---|---|---|---|---|---|---|---|---|---|---|---|---|---|
| 46 | 20 | 13 | 13 | 66 | 57 | +9 | 73 | 13 | 6 | 4 | 34 | 17 | +17 | 7 | 7 | 9 | 32 | 40 | −8 |

Last updated: 4 May 2017.

==== Results by matchday ====
| Matchday | 1 | 2 | 3 | 4 | 5 | 6 | 7 | 8 | 9 | 10 | 11 | 12 | 13 | 14 | 15 | 16 | 17 | 18 | 19 | 20 | 21 | 22 | 23 | 24 | 25 | 26 | 27 | 28 | 29 | 30 | 31 | 32 | 33 | 34 | 35 | 36 | 37 | 38 | 39 | 40 | 41 | 42 | 43 | 44 | 45 | 46 |
|---|---|---|---|---|---|---|---|---|---|---|---|---|---|---|---|---|---|---|---|---|---|---|---|---|---|---|---|---|---|---|---|---|---|---|---|---|---|---|---|---|---|---|---|---|---|---|
| Ground | H | A | A | H | A | H | H | A | H | A | A | A | H | H | A | H | A | H | A | H | A | H | H | H | A | A | A | H | A | H | H | H | A | H | H | H | A | A | A | H | A | A | H | A | H | A |
| Result | W | D | L | W | W | D | D | L | L | L | L | W | L | W | W | W | L | D | W | L | L | W | W | W | D | D | D | D | W | W | W | D | D | W | W | D | D | L | L | W | W | D | W | L | L | W |
| Position | 1 | 3 | 12 | 8 | 5 | 4 | 5 | 8 | 14 | 17 | 19 | 17 | 20 | 16 | 13 | 8 | 13 | 13 | 9 | 12 | 14 | 10 | 9 | 9 | 9 | 8 | 9 | 10 | 9 | 6 | 6 | 6 | 7 | 6 | 6 | 7 | 6 | 7 | 7 | 7 | 7 | 6 | 6 | 6 | 6 | 6 |

Updated to match(es) played on 4 May 2017. Source: Statto.com
A = Away; H = Home; W = Win; D = Draw; L = Loss

==== Matches ====
| 6 August 2016 1 | Millwall | 3–0 | Oldham Athletic | South Bermondsey |
| 15:00 BST | Gregory 13'; O'Brien 45+3'; Webster 46' | Report | | Stadium: The Den; Attendance: 9,787 (away 312); Referee: Roger East |

| 13 August 2016 2 | Milton Keynes Dons | 2–2 | Millwall | Milton Keynes |
| 15:00 BST | Agard 28', 33' | Report | 24' Craig; 27' Worrall | Stadium: stadium:mk Attendance: 10,232; Referee: Simon Hooper |

| 16 August 2016 3 | Peterborough United | 5–1 | Millwall | Peterborough |
| 19:45 BST | Maddison 6'; Taylor 7'; Edwards 20', 52'; Nichols 67' | Report | 79' Morison | Stadium: London Road Stadium; Attendance: 5,007; Referee: Ross Joyce |

| 20 August 2016 4 | Millwall | 2–1 | Sheffield United | South Bermondsey |
| 15:00 BST | Williams 14'; Morison 89' (pen.) | Report | 21' Scougall | Stadium: The Den; Attendance: 9,058; Referee: Andy Woolmer |

| 27 August 2016 5 | Chesterfield | 1–3 | Millwall | Chesterfield |
| 15:00 BST | Hird 65' | Report | Ferguson 13'; Morison 38', 41' | Stadium: Proact Stadium; Attendance: 5,689 (away 513); Referee: Lee Probert |

| 3 September 2016 6 | Millwall | 1–1 | Bradford City | South Bermondsey |
| 15:00 BST | J Martin 49' | Report | 42' (o.g.) Webster | Stadium: The Den; Attendance: 9,067; Referee: Charles Breakspear |

| 10 September 2016 7 | Millwall | 1–1 | Coventry City | London |
| 15:00 BST | O'Brien 71'; Martin (yellow card) 78' | Report | Sordell 23'; Sterry (yellow card) 90+1' | Stadium: The Den; Attendance: 8,755 |

| 17 September 2016 8 | Southend United | 3–1 | Millwall | Southend-on-Sea |
| 15:00 BST | Mooney 6'; McLaughlin 50'; McGlashan (yellow card) 79'; O'Neill 87' | Report | Martin (yellow card) 24'; O'Brien 33'; Thompson (yellow card) 84'; Webster (yellow card) 86' | Stadium: Roots Hall Stadium; Attendance: 7,752 (away 1,923); Referee: Graham Salisbury |

| 24 September 2016 9 | Millwall | 2–3 | Rochdale | London |
| 15:00 BST | O'Brien 11'; Gregory 18'; Thompson (yellow card) 61' (yellow-red card) 73'; Webster (yellow card) 69'; Craig (yellow card) 74'; Abdou (yellow card) 86'; (yellow card) 87' Williams | BBC Report | 9' Camps; (yellow card) 19' Canavan; (yellow card) 45+3' Bunney; 67' (yellow card) 85' Andrew; 90+3' Henderson | Stadium: The Den; Attendance: 8,413; Referee: John Brooks |

| 27 September 2016 10 | Port Vale | 3–1 | Millwall | Stoke-on-Trent |
| 19:45 BST | Jones 4' (yellow card) 21'; Grant (yellow card) 9'; Hart (yellow card) 32'; Paterson (yellow card) 42' (goal) 59'; Streete 71' (yellow card) 90'; Paulo Tavares (yellow card) 82' | Report | Morison (yellow card) 24'; Webster (yellow card) 31'; Gregory 84' (pen.) | Stadium: Vale Park; Attendance: 3,934; Referee: Jeremy Simpson |

| 1 October 2016 11 | Walsall | 2–1 | Millwall | Walsall |
| 15:00 BST | Jackson 17'; Moussa 49' | Report | Onyedinma 22' | Stadium: The Banks's Stadium; Attendance: 4,474; Referee: Lee Probert |

| 15 October 2016 12 | Northampton Town | 1–3 | Millwall | Northampton |
| 15:00 BST | McCourt (yellow card) 54' (yellow-red card); Richards 80' | Report | 32' Gregory; 60' Butcher; 89' Morison | Stadium: Sixfields Stadium; Attendance: 6,908; Referee: Ben Toner |

| 18 October 2016 13 | Millwall | 0–2 | Bolton Wanderers | Bermondsey, London |
| 19:45 BST | | Report | Sammy Ameobi 3'; Clough (yellow card) 18'; Wheater 86' | Stadium: The Den; Attendance: 7,898; Referee: Darren Deadman |

| 22 October 2016 14 | Millwall | 2–1 | Fleetwood Town | Bermondsey, London |
| 15:00 BST | Gregory 31' (pen.), 48' (pen.) | Report | Woolford (yellow card) 25'; Hunter 65'; Ryan (yellow card) 81' | Stadium: The Den; Attendance: 8,085; Referee: Carl Boyeson |

| 29 October 2016 15 | Oxford United | 1–2 | Millwall | Oxford |
| 13:00 BST | Skarz (yellow card) 26'; Sercombe 31'; Edwards (yellow card) 52'; Rothwell (yellow card) 65'; Maguire (yellow card) 68' | Report | Romeo (yellow card) 9'; Thompson (yellow card) 23'; Morison 36' (yellow card) 90+3'; O'Brien 50'; Ferguson (yellow card) 67' | Stadium: The Kassam Stadium; Attendance: 7,944; Referee: Roger East |

| 12 November 2016 16 | Millwall | 4–0 | Bristol Rovers | Bermondsey, London |
| 15:00 GMT | O'Brien 22'; Williams 64'; Gregory 68'; Onyedinma (yellow card) 86'; Smith 88' | Report | Leadbitter (red card) 14'; Hartley (yellow card) 75' | Stadium: The Den; Attendance: 9,645; Referee: Andrew Madley |

| 19 November 2016 17 | Bolton Wanderers | 2–0 | Millwall | Bolton |
| 15:00 GMT | Trotter (yellow card) 7'; Vela 17'; Thorpe 57' | Report | Williams (yellow card) 34' | Stadium: Macron Stadium; Attendance: 13,110; Referee: Paul Tierney |

| 22 November 2016 18 | Millwall | 0–0 | AFC Wimbledon | Bermondsey, London |
| 19:45 GMT | Thompson (yellow card) 33'; Martin (yellow card) 71'; Criag (yellow card) 82' | Report | Meades (yellow card) 51' (yellow-red card) 74'; Fuller (yellow card) 88' | Stadium: The Den; Attendance: 8,614; Referee: Graham Horwood |

| 26 November 2016 19 | Bury | 2–3 | Millwall | Bury |
| 15:00 GMT | Jones (yellow card) 45'; Vaughan 61', 67'; Maher (red card) 69'; Kay (yellow card) 71'; Etuhu (yellow card) 90+5' | Report | Williams 70' (pen.); Smith (yellow card) 71'; Butcher 86'; O'Brien 90+2' (yellow card) 90+3' | Stadium: Gigg Lane; Attendance: 3,028; Referee: Jeremy Simpson |

| 10 December 2016 20 | Millwall | 0–1 | Shrewsbury Town | Bermondsey, London |
| 15:00 GMT | Thompson (yellow card) 7'; Smith (yellow card) 79' | Report | Dodds 17'; McGivern (yellow card) 31'; Brown (yellow card) 61' | Stadium: The Den; Attendance: 8,354; Referee: John Busby |

| 17 December 2016 21 | Scunthorpe United | 3–0 | Millwall | Scunthorpe |
| 15:00 GMT | Madden (yellow card) 2' (goal) 36', 67'; Adelakun 45'; Wallace (yellow card) 46' | Report | Romeo (yellow card) 22'; Martin (yellow card) 36'; Hutchinson (yellow card) 61'; Thompson (yellow card) 76'; Williams (yellow card) 86' | Stadium: Glanford Park; Attendance: 4,355; Referee: Roger East |

| 21 December 2016 22 | Millwall | 3–1 | Charlton Athletic | Bermondsey, London |
| 19:45 GMT | O'Brien 40'; Morison 42', 60' | Report | Teixeira (yellow card) 31'; Ajose 49' | Stadium: The Den; Attendance: 14,395; Referee: Christopher Kavanagh |

| 26 December 2016 23 | Millwall | 2–0 | Swindon Town | Bermondsey, London |
| 15:00 GMT | Gregory 10', 65' (yellow card) 73'; Webster (yellow card) 57'; Craig (yellow card) 59' | Report | Smith (yellow card) 42'; Kasim (yellow card) 73'; Furlong (yellow card) 75' | Stadium: The Den; Attendance: 8,515; Referee: Nick Kinseley |

| 30 December 2016 24 | Millwall | 2–1 | Gillingham | Bermondsey, London |
| 19:45 GMT | Gregory 13' (yellow card) 90'; Thompson (yellow card) 28'; Onyedinma 63' | Report | Konchesky (yellow card) 58' (yellow-red card) 66'; Wright (yellow card) 70'; Dack (yellow card) 73' (goal) 75' | Stadium: The Den; Attendance: 10,821; Referee: Tim Robinson |

| 2 January 2017 25 | AFC Wimbledon | 2–2 | Millwall | Kingston upon Thames |
| 13:00 GMT | Taylor 12'; Elliott 51' | Report | O'Brien 5'; Morison 40' (yellow card) 74' | Stadium: Kingsmeadow Stadium; Attendance: 4,742; Referee: Nigel Miller |

| 14 January 2017 26 | Charlton Athletic | 0–0 | Millwall | Charlton, London |
| 15:00 GMT | Teixeira (yellow card) 37' (yellow-red card) 90+6'; Watt (yellow card) 53'; Solly (yellow card) 85' | Report | Thompson (yellow card) 32'; Williams (yellow card) 44'; Webster (yellow card) 77'; Gregory (yellow card) 90' | Stadium: The Valley; Attendance: 15,315; Referee: Keith Stroud |

| 21 January 2017 27 | Bradford City | 1–1 | Millwall | Bradford |
| 15:00 GMT | Knight-Percival (yellow card) 36'; Meredith 60'; McMahon (yellow card) 90' | Report | Williams (yellow card) 18'; Gregory 50' (yellow card) 52'; Ferguson (yellow card) 83' | Stadium: The Coral Windows Stadium; Attendance: 17,712; Referee: Mark Brown |

| 1 February 2017 28 | Millwall | 0–0 | Walsall | Bermondsey, London |
| 19:45 GMT | | Report | Osbourne (yellow card) 25'; Edwards (yellow card) 75' | Stadium: The Den; Attendance: 7,392; Referee: Darren Deadman |

| 4 February 2017 29 | Coventry City | 0–2 | Millwall | Coventry |
| 15:00 GMT | | Report | Cooper 33'; Webster (yellow card) 69'; Morison 79' | Stadium: Ricoh Arena; Attendance: 8,764; Referee: Mark Heywood |

| 11 February 2017 30 | Millwall | 1–0 | Southend United | Bermondsey, London |
| 15:00 GMT | Craig (yellow card) 20'; Onyedinma 62' | Report | Atkinson (red card) 34'; Robinson (yellow card) 61'; McGlashan (yellow card) 87' | Stadium: The Den; Attendance: 10,323; Referee: Andre Marriner |

| 14 February 2017 31 | Millwall | 2–0 | Port Vale | Bermondsey, London |
| 19:45 GMT | O'Brien 26'; Cooper 52'; Williams (yellow card) 85' | Report | | Stadium: The Den; Attendance: 7,032; Referee: Darren Drysdale |

| 21 February 2017 32 | Millwall | 0–0 | Chesterfield | Bermondsey, London |
| 19:45 GMT | Webster (yellow card) 33' | Report | Grimshaw (yellow card) 18' | Stadium: The Den; Attendance: 9,005; Referee: Lee Collins |

| 25 February 2017 33 | Oldham Athletic | 0–0 | Millwall | Oldham |
| 15:00 GMT | O'Neill (yellow card) 76'; Taylor (yellow card) 89'; Ngoo (yellow card) 90+4' | Report | Williams (yellow card) 84' | Stadium: Boundary Park; Attendance: 3,856; Referee: Carl Boyeson |

| 28 February 2017 34 | Millwall | 1–0 | Peterborough United | Bermondsey, London |
| 19:45 GMT | Gregory 54' (pen.); Ferguson (yellow card) 73' | Report | Grant (yellow card) 53'; Maddison (yellow card) 90+1'; Inman (yellow card) 90+4' | Stadium: The Den; Attendance: 8,032; Referee: Kevin Johnson |

| 4 March 2017 35 | Millwall | 2–1 | Milton Keynes Dons | Bermondsey, London |
| 15:00 GMT | Gregory 24', 90+2' (pen.) (yellow card) 90+4'; Ferguson (yellow card) 50'; Thompson (yellow card) 62'; Morison (yellow card) 90+7' | Report | Reeves 30'; Walsh (yellow card) 75'; Martin (yellow card) 77'; Lewington (yellow card) 90+3'; Baldock (yellow card) 90+5' | Stadium: The Den; Attendance: 9,636; Referee: Ross Joyce |

| 18 March 2017 36 | Millwall | 0–0 | Bury | Bermondsey, London |
| 15:00 GMT | Wallace (yellow card) 66' | Report | Murphy (yellow card) 90+4' | Stadium: The Den; Attendance: 9,049; Referee: Gavin Ward |

| 21 March 2017 37 | Rochdale | 3–3 | Millwall | Rochdale |
| 19:45 GMT | Allen (yellow card) 12'; Mendez-Laing 33'; Vincenti (yellow card) 36'; Henderson 44'; Camps 54'; McNulty (yellow card) 68' | Report | Gregory 14' (pen.); O'Brien 25'; Cooper (yellow card) 43'; Butcher (yellow card) 44'; Craig (yellow card) 53'; Wallace 77' | Stadium: Spotland Stadium; Attendance: 2,334; Referee: Darren England |

| 25 March 2017 38 | Swindon Town | 1–0 | Millwall | Swindon |
| 13:30 GMT | Thompson (yellow card) 89'; Conroy (yellow card) 90+2'; Thomas 90+5' | Report | Gregory (yellow card) 20'; Butcher (yellow card) 87' | Stadium: County Ground; Attendance: 7,038; Referee: John Busby |

| 28 March 2017 39 | Sheffield United | 2–0 | Millwall | Sheffield |
| 19:45 GMT | O'Connell 16'; Wright (yellow card) 31'; Freeman 55'; Fleck (yellow card) 90' | Report | Thompson (yellow card) 45+2'; O'Brien (yellow card) 90+3' | Stadium: Bramall Lane; Attendance: 20,832; Referee: Jeremy Simpson |

| 1 April 2017 40 | Millwall | 3–1 | Scunthorpe United | Bermondsey, London |
| 15:00 GMT | Williams 3' (pen.); Ferguson 57'; Morison (yellow card) 62'; O'Brien 68'; Worrall (yellow card) 90+3' | Report | Sutton (yellow card) 86'; Crooks 90+4' | Stadium: The Den; Attendance: 9,789; Referee: Nigel Miller |

| 4 April 2017 41 | Shrewsbury Town | 1–2 | Millwall | Shrewsbury |
| 19:45 GMT | Rodman (yellow card) 52'; Whalley 90' | Report | Webster 35'; Morison (yellow card) 54'; Hutchinson 77' (yellow card) 83'; Craig (yellow card) 90+5' | Stadium: New Meadow; Attendance: 4,712; Referee: Mark Haywood |

| 8 April 2017 42 | Gillingham | 1–1 | Millwall | Gillingham |
| 15:00 BST | Martin (yellow card) 22'; Byrne (yellow card) 61'; Quigley 67'; Wright (yellow card) 90' | Report | King (yellow card) 66'; Morison 72' | Stadium: Priestfield Stadium; Attendance: 7,221; Referee: Charles Breakspear |

| 14 April 2017 43 | Millwall | 3–0 | Northampton Town | Bermondsey, London |
| 15:00 BST | O'Brien 27'; Wallace 38', 45+4' | Report | Williams (yellow card) 52' | Stadium: The Den; Attendance: 10,886; Referee: Graham Salisbury |

| 17 April 2017 44 | Fleetwood Town | 1–0 | Millwall | Fleetwood |
| 15:00 BST | Davies 45+2'; Nirennold (yellow card) 72'; Glendon (yellow card) 77' | Report | | Stadium: Highbury Stadium; Attendance: 3,665; Referee: John Brooks |

| 22 April 2017 45 | Millwall | 0–3 | Oxford United | Bermondsey, London |
| 15:00 BST | Craig (yellow card) 28' | Report | McAleny 6', 9'; Ruffels 71' | Stadium: The Den; Attendance: 12,533; Referee: Dean Whitestone |

| 30 April 2017 46 | Bristol Rovers | 3–4 | Millwall | Bristol |
| 12:00 BST | Easter 33'; Lines 42'; Bodin 74' | Report | Gregory 5', 35'; Craig (yellow card) 20' (goal) 25'; Hutchinson 85'; Morison (yellow card) 90+4' | Stadium: Memorial Stadium; Attendance: 11,750; Referee: Darren Handley |

==== Play-offs ====
| 4 May 2017 Semi-final first leg | Millwall | 0–0 | Scunthorpe United | Bermondsey, London |
| 19:45 BST | Morison (yellow card) 42'; Ferguson (yellow card) 69'; Craig (yellow card) 87' | Report | Toney (yellow card) 24'; Wallace (yellow card) 64' | Stadium: The Den; Attendance: 12,568; Referee: Andrew Madley |

| 7 May 2017 Semi-final second leg | Scunthorpe United | 2–3 (2–3 agg.) | Millwall | Scunthorpe |
| 18:30 BST | Toney 19'; Dawson (yellow card) 35' (goal) 81'; Ness (yellow card) 51'; Bishop (yellow card) 88' | Report | Abdou (yellow card) 39'; Williams (yellow card) 41'; Morison 45', 58'; Gregory 52' | Stadium: Glanford Park; Referee: Chris Kavanagh |

| 20 May 2017 Final | Bradford City | 0–1 | Millwall | Wembley, London |
| 15:00 BST | Meredith (yellow card) 76' | Report | O'Brien (yellow card) 58'; Morison 85' | Stadium: Wembley Stadium; Attendance: 53,320; Referee: Simon Hooper |

=== FA Cup ===
| 4 November 2016 First round | Millwall | 1–0 | Southend United | Bermondsey, London |
| 19:45 GMT | Archer (yellow card) 45+3'; Romeo 88' | Report | Wordsworth (yellow card) 66'; McLaughlin (yellow card) 68'; Cox (yellow card) 84'; Leonard (yellow card) 90+5' | Stadium: The Den; Attendance: 4,502; Referee: James Linington |

| 4 December 2016 Second round | Millwall | 5–2 | Braintree Town | Bermondsey, London |
| 14:00 GMT | Smith 17', 21', 48'; Ferguson 25'; Webster (yellow card) 35'; O'Brien 90+4' | Report | Cheek 16'; Midson 34'; Gayle (yellow card) 60' | Stadium: The Den; Attendance: 3,345; Referee: Darren Deadman |

| 7 January 2017 Third round | Millwall | 3–0 | AFC Bournemouth | Bermondsey, London |
| 15:00 GMT | Morison 26'; Cummings 49'; Thompson (yellow card) 61'; Ferguson 90+3' | Report | Surman (yellow card) 63'; Wilson (yellow card) 75' | Stadium: The Den; Attendance: 9,471; Referee: Andrew Madley |

| 29 January 2017 Fourth round | Millwall | 1–0 | Watford | Bermondsey, London |
| 12:00 GMT | Morison 85'; Wallace (yellow card) 90+6' | Report | Britos (yellow card) 90+6'; Mason (yellow card) 81'; Abdoulaye Doucouré (yellow card) 90+1' | Stadium: The Den; Attendance: 9,772; Referee: Martin Atkinson |

| 18 February 2017 Fifth round | Millwall | 1–0 | Leicester City | Bermondsey, London |
| 15:00 GMT | Cooper (yellow card) 45' (yellow-red card) 52'; Cummings 90' | Report | Zieler (yellow card) 54' | Stadium: The Den; Attendance: 18,012; Referee: Craig Pawson |

| 12 March 2017 Sixth round | Tottenham Hotspur | 6–0 | Millwall | Tottenham, London |
| 14:00 GMT | Eriksen 31'; Son Heung-min 41', 54', 90+2'; Alli 72'; Janssen 79' | Report | Wallace (yellow card) 43'; Craig (yellow card) 57' | Stadium: White Hart Lane; Attendance: 31,137; Referee: Martin Atkinson |

=== EFL Cup ===
| 9 August 2016 First round | Barnet | 0–4 | Millwall | Canons Park |
| 20:00 BST | | Report | 23' (o.g.) Akinde; 35' O'Brien; 74' Morison; 81' (pen.) Onyedinma | Stadium: The Hive Stadium; Referee: Dean Whitestone |

| 23 August 2016 Second round | Millwall | 1–2 | Nottingham Forest | Bermondsey, London |
| 19:45 BST | Williams 77' | Report | 35' Paterson; 87' Veldwijk | Stadium: The Den; Attendance: 4,009; Referee: Gavin Ward |

=== EFL Trophy ===
| Pos | Div | Team | Pld | W | PW | PL | L | GF | GA | GD | Pts | Qualification |
|---|---|---|---|---|---|---|---|---|---|---|---|---|
| 1 | L1 | Millwall | 3 | 3 | 0 | 0 | 0 | 7 | 2 | +5 | 9 | Advance to Round 2 |
| 2 | L2 | Luton Town | 3 | 2 | 0 | 0 | 1 | 5 | 4 | +1 | 6 | Advance to Round 2 |
| 3 | L1 | Gillingham | 3 | 1 | 0 | 0 | 2 | 4 | 4 | 0 | 3 | |
| 4 | ACA | West Bromwich Albion U21 | 3 | 0 | 0 | 0 | 3 | 0 | 6 | −6 | 0 | |

Source: Sky Sports

| 30 August 2016 Group stage 1 | Millwall | 2–0 | West Bromwich Albion U23 | Bermondsey, London |
| 19:45 BST | Abdou 63'; Morison 76' (pen.) | | O'Shea (yellow card) 75' | Stadium: The Den |

| 4 October 2016 Group stage 2 | Millwall | 2–1 | Gillingham | Bermondsey, London |
| 19:45 BST | Butcher (yellow card) 14'; Gregory (yellow card) 34'; Chesmain (yellow card) 40'; Williams (yellow card) 45'; Onyedinma 45+4'; Morison (yellow card) 70' (goal) 88' | Report | Wright 17' (yellow card) 89'; Jackson (yellow card) 34'; List (yellow card) 82' | Stadium: The Den; Attendance: 2,104; Referee: Chris Sarginson |

| 8 November 2016 Group stage 3 | Luton Town | 1–3 | Millwall | Luton |
| 19:30 GMT | Hutchinson 58' (o.g.) | Report | Smith (yellow card) 67' (goal) 81', 87'; Onyedinma 72' | Stadium: Kenilworth Road Stadium; Attendance: 2,251; Referee: Oliver Langford |

| 7 December 2016 Second round | Millwall | 1–3 | Wycombe Wanderers | Bermondsey, London |
| 19:45 GMT | Worrall 53'; Onyedinma (penalty missed) 72' | Report | Akinfenwa 51' (pen.); Pierre (yellow card) 71' de Havilland (yellow card) 82'; Thompson 85', 90+1' | Stadium: The Den; Attendance: 1,619; Referee: Dean Whitestone |

== Squad ==
| No. | Name | Pos. | Nat. | Place of Birth | Age | Apps | Goals | Signed from | Date signed | Fee | Ends |
Goalkeepers
| 1 | Jordan Archer | GK | (Scotland) (England) | Walthamstow | 33 | 94 | 0 | Tottenham Hotspur | 22 June 2015 | Free | 2019 |
| 31 | Tom King | GK | (England) | Croydon | 31 | 15 | 0 | Crystal Palace | 31 August 2014 | Free | Undisclosed |
Defenders
| 2 | Shaun Cummings | RB | (Jamaica) (England) | Hammersmith | 37 | 54 | 3 | Reading | 12 January 2015 | Undisclosed | 2017 |
| 3 | Joe Martin | LB | (England) | Dagenham | 37 | 67 | 4 | Gillingham | 22 June 2015 | Free | 2017 |
| 4 | Shaun Hutchinson | CB | (England) | Newcastle upon Tyne | 35 | 20 | 1 | Fulham | 1 July 2016 | Free | 2018 |
| 5 | Tony Craig | CB | (England) | Greenwich | 41 | 224 | 8 | Brentford | 4 July 2015 | Free | 2017 |
| 12 | Mahlon Romeo | RB | (Antigua and Barbuda) (England) | Westminster | 31 | 54 | 1 | Gillingham | 5 May 2015 | Free | 2019 |
| 15 | Sid Nelson | CB | (England) | Lewisham | 30 | 38 | 0 | Academy | 1 July 2013 | Trainee | 2018 |
| 17 | Byron Webster | CB | (England) | Sherburn-in-Elmet | 39 | 118 | 7 | Yeovil Town | 1 July 2014 | Free | 2017 |
| 24 | Jake Cooper | CB | (England) | Ascot | 31 | 18 | 2 | Reading | 19 January 2017 | Loan | 2017 |
| 25 | Christian Mbulu | CB | (England) | | 30 | 0 | 0 | Brentwood Town | 6 August 2015 | Free | Undisclosed |
| 33 | Noah Chesmain | LB | (England) | | 28 | 3 | 0 | Academy | 1 July 2015 | Trainee | Undisclosed |
midfielders
| 6 | Shaun Williams | DM | (Republic of Ireland) | Dublin | 40 | 153 | 12 | Milton Keynes Dons | 27 January 2014 | Undisclosed | Undisclosed |
| 7 | David Worrall | RM | (England) | Manchester | 36 | 39 | 1 | Southend United | 1 July 2016 | Free | 2018 |
| 8 | Ben Thompson | CM | (England) | Sidcup | 31 | 83 | 2 | Academy | 1 July 2014 | Trainee | Undisclosed |
| 10 | Fred Onyedinma | AM | (Nigeria) (England) | Plumstead | 29 | 104 | 11 | Academy | 1 July 2013 | Trainee | 2017 |
| 14 | Jed Wallace | AM | (England) | Reading | 32 | 34 | 4 | Wolverhampton Wanderers | 19 January 2017 | Loan | 2017 |
| 16 | Calum Butcher | DM | (England) | Rochford | 35 | 37 | 2 | Burton Albion | 25 August 2016 | Undisclosed | 2018 |
| 18 | Shane Ferguson | LM | (Northern Ireland) | Derry | 35 | 96 | 7 | Newcastle United | 26 January 2016 | Undisclosed | 2017 |
| 26 | Jimmy Abdou | CM | (Comoros) (France) | Martigues | 42 | 342 | 10 | Plymouth Argyle | 3 July 2008 | Free | Undisclosed |
| 27 | Kris Twardek | LM | (Canada) (Czech Republic) | Toronto | 29 | 2 | 0 | Academy | 1 July 2015 | Trainee | 2017 |
| 38 | Kyron Farrell | CM | (England) | | 29 | 1 | 0 | Academy | 1 July 2016 | Trainee | Undisclosed |
Forwards
| 9 | Lee Gregory | CF | (England) | Sheffield | 38 | 140 | 54 | Halifax Town | 17 June 2014 | £250,000 | 2017 |
| 20 | Steve Morison | CF | (Wales) (England) | Enfield | 43 | 243 | 86 | Leeds United | 4 August 2015 | Free | 2017 |
| 22 | Aiden O'Brien | CF | (Republic of Ireland) (England) | Islington | 33 | 145 | 30 | Academy | 1 August 2011 | Trainee | 2019 |
| 28 | Jamie Philpot | CF | (England) | Pembury | 30 | 13 | 1 | Academy | 1 July 2014 | Trainee | Undisclosed |
| 29 | Alfie Pavey | CF | (England) | | 31 | 8 | 0 | Academy | 1 January 2014 | Trainee | Undisclosed |
| 30 | Harry Smith | CF | (England) | | 31 | 11 | 6 | Folkestone Invicta | 9 August 2016 | Undisclosed | 2018 |
Out on loan
| 36 | Paul Rooney | CB | (Republic of Ireland) | | 29 | 1 | 0 | Free agent | 4 July 2016 | Undisclosed | |
| | David Forde | GK | (Republic of Ireland) | Galway | 46 | 339 | 0 | Cardiff City | 5 June 2008 | Free | 2017 |

=== Statistics ===
As of 20 May 2017

| No. | Pos | Nat | Player | Total | | League One | | FA Cup | | League Cup | | League Trophy | |
| No. | Pos | Nat | Player | Apps | Goals | Apps | Goals | Apps | Goals | Apps | Goals | Apps | Goals |
|---|---|---|---|---|---|---|---|---|---|---|---|---|---|
| 1 | GK | (Scotland) SCO | Jordan Archer | 41 | 0 | 36+0 | 0 | 4+0 | 0 | 1+0 | 0 | 0+0 | 0 |
| 2 | DF | (Jamaica) JAM | Shaun Cummings | 21 | 2 | 15+1 | 0 | 4+0 | 2 | 0+0 | 0 | 1+0 | 0 |
| 3 | DF | (England) ENG | Joe Martin | 27 | 1 | 19+4 | 1 | 1+0 | 0 | 1+0 | 0 | 1+1 | 0 |
| 4 | DF | (England) ENG | Shaun Hutchinson | 16 | 1 | 12+2 | 1 | 1+0 | 0 | 0+0 | 0 | 1+0 | 0 |
| 5 | DF | (England) ENG | Tony Craig | 51 | 2 | 42+0 | 2 | 4+1 | 0 | 1+0 | 0 | 2+1 | 0 |
| 6 | MF | (Republic of Ireland) IRL | Shaun Williams | 51 | 5 | 42+1 | 4 | 5+0 | 0 | 1+0 | 1 | 2+0 | 0 |
| 7 | MF | (England) ENG | David Worrall | 39 | 1 | 14+18 | 1 | 2+1 | 0 | 0+2 | 0 | 1+1 | 0 |
| 8 | MF | (England) ENG | Ben Thompson | 44 | 0 | 35+2 | 0 | 3+0 | 0 | 2+0 | 0 | 1+1 | 0 |
| 9 | FW | (England) ENG | Lee Gregory | 42 | 17 | 35+1 | 17 | 4+1 | 0 | 0+0 | 0 | 1+0 | 0 |
| 10 | MF | (Nigeria) NGR | Fred Onyedinma | 49 | 6 | 22+18 | 3 | 3+2 | 0 | 2+0 | 1 | 1+1 | 2 |
| 12 | DF | (Antigua and Barbuda) ANT | Mahlon Romeo | 35 | 0 | 30+1 | 0 | 1+1 | 0 | 1+0 | 0 | 1+0 | 0 |
| 14 | MF | (England) ENG | Jed Wallace | 17 | 3 | 13+2 | 3 | 1+1 | 0 | 0+0 | 0 | 0+0 | 0 |
| 15 | DF | (England) ENG | Sid Nelson | 8 | 0 | 2+1 | 0 | 1+0 | 0 | 2+0 | 0 | 2+0 | 0 |
| 16 | MF | (England) ENG | Calum Butcher | 35 | 2 | 9+20 | 2 | 2+2 | 0 | 0+0 | 0 | 2+0 | 0 |
| 17 | DF | (England) ENG | Byron Webster | 47 | 1 | 40+0 | 1 | 5+0 | 0 | 2+0 | 0 | 0+0 | 0 |
| 18 | MF | (Northern Ireland) NIR | Shane Ferguson | 47 | 4 | 22+18 | 2 | 2+3 | 2 | 1+1 | 0 | 0+0 | 0 |
| 20 | FW | (Wales) WAL | Steve Morison | 45 | 16 | 34+3 | 11 | 4+0 | 2 | 1+1 | 1 | 1+1 | 2 |
| 22 | FW | (Republic of Ireland) IRL | Aiden O'Brien | 51 | 15 | 35+7 | 13 | 4+1 | 1 | 2+0 | 1 | 2+0 | 0 |
| 24 | DF | (England) ENG | Jake Cooper | 18 | 1 | 13+2 | 1 | 3+0 | 0 | 0+0 | 0 | 0+0 | 0 |
| 26 | MF | (Comoros) COM | Jimmy Abdou | 18 | 1 | 6+6 | 0 | 0+2 | 0 | 2+0 | 0 | 1+1 | 1 |
| 27 | MF | (Canada) CAN | Kris Twardek | 2 | 0 | 0+0 | 0 | 0+0 | 0 | 0+0 | 0 | 1+1 | 0 |
| 28 | FW | (England) ENG | Jamie Philpot | 5 | 0 | 0+2 | 0 | 0+0 | 0 | 1+1 | 0 | 1+0 | 0 |
| 30 | FW | (England) ENG | Harry Smith | 11 | 6 | 7+2 | 1 | 1+0 | 3 | 0+0 | 0 | 1+0 | 2 |
| 31 | GK | (England) ENG | Tom King | 15 | 0 | 10+1 | 0 | 1+0 | 0 | 1+0 | 0 | 2+0 | 0 |
| 32 | DF | (England) ENG | James Brown | 1 | 0 | 0+0 | 0 | 0+0 | 0 | 0+0 | 0 | 1+0 | 0 |
| 33 | DF | (England) ENG | Noah Chesmain | 2 | 0 | 0+0 | 0 | 0+0 | 0 | 0+0 | 0 | 2+0 | 0 |
| 38 | MF | (England) ENG | Kyron Farrell | 1 | 0 | 0+0 | 0 | 0+0 | 0 | 0+0 | 0 | 1+0 | 0 |
Out on Loan:
| 11 | MF | (Scotland) SCO | Gregg Wylde | 10 | 0 | 2+3 | 0 | 0+0 | 0 | 2+0 | 0 | 3+0 | 0 |
| 36 | DF | (Republic of Ireland) IRL | Paul Rooney | 1 | 0 | 0+0 | 0 | 0+0 | 0 | 0+0 | 0 | 1+0 | 0 |

==== Play-off Statistic ====
As of 20 May 2017

| No. | Pos | Nat | Player | Total | | Play-offs | |
| No. | Pos | Nat | Player | Apps | Goals | Apps | Goals |
|---|---|---|---|---|---|---|---|
| 1 | GK | (Scotland) SCO | Jordan Archer | 3 | 0 | 3+0 | 0 |
| 2 | DF | (Jamaica) JAM | Shaun Cummings | 1 | 0 | 1+0 | 0 |
| 4 | DF | (England) ENG | Shaun Hutchinson | 3 | 0 | 3+0 | 0 |
| 5 | DF | (England) ENG | Tony Craig | 3 | 0 | 3+0 | 0 |
| 6 | MF | (Republic of Ireland) IRL | Shaun Williams | 3 | 0 | 3+0 | 0 |
| 9 | FW | (England) ENG | Lee Gregory | 3 | 1 | 3+0 | 1 |
| 10 | MF | (Nigeria) NGR | Fred Onyedinma | 1 | 0 | 0+1 | 0 |
| 12 | DF | (Antigua and Barbuda) ANT | Mahlon Romeo | 3 | 0 | 2+1 | 0 |
| 14 | MF | (England) ENG | Jed Wallace | 3 | 0 | 3+0 | 0 |
| 16 | MF | (England) ENG | Calum Butcher | 2 | 0 | 0+2 | 0 |
| 17 | DF | (England) ENG | Byron Webster | 3 | 0 | 3+0 | 0 |
| 18 | MF | (Northern Ireland) NIR | Shane Ferguson | 3 | 0 | 1+2 | 0 |
| 20 | FW | (Wales) WAL | Steve Morison | 3 | 3 | 3+0 | 3 |
| 22 | FW | (Republic of Ireland) IRL | Aiden O'Brien | 3 | 0 | 2+1 | 0 |
| 26 | MF | (Comoros) COM | Jimmy Abdou | 3 | 0 | 3+0 | 0 |

==== Goals record ====
As of 7 May 2017

| Rank | No. | Nat. | Po. | Name | League One | FA Cup | League Cup | League Trophy | Play-offs | Total |
|---|---|---|---|---|---|---|---|---|---|---|
| 1 | 20 | (Wales) | CF | Steve Morison | 11 | 2 | 1 | 2 | 3 | 19 |
| 2 | 9 | (England) | CF | Lee Gregory | 17 | 0 | 0 | 0 | 1 | 18 |
| 3 | 22 | (Republic of Ireland) | CF | Aiden O'Brien | 13 | 1 | 1 | 0 | 0 | 15 |
| 4 | 10 | (Nigeria) | AM | Fred Onyedinma | 3 | 0 | 1 | 2 | 0 | 6 |
| 4 | 30 | (England) | CF | Harry Smith | 1 | 3 | 0 | 2 | 0 | 6 |
| 6 | 6 | (Republic of Ireland) | DM | Shaun Williams | 4 | 0 | 1 | 0 | 0 | 5 |
| 7 | 18 | (England) | LM | Shane Ferguson | 2 | 2 | 0 | 0 | 0 | 4 |
| 8 | 14 | (England) | RM | Jed Wallace | 3 | 0 | 0 | 0 | 0 | 3 |
| 9 | 2 | (Jamaica) | RB | Shaun Cummings | 0 | 2 | 0 | 0 | 0 | 2 |
| 9 | 5 | (England) | CB | Tony Craig | 2 | 0 | 0 | 0 | 0 | 2 |
| 9 | 16 | (England) | DM | Calum Butcher | 2 | 0 | 0 | 0 | 0 | 2 |
| 9 | 24 | (England) | CB | Jake Cooper | 2 | 0 | 0 | 0 | 0 | 2 |
| 12 | 3 | (England) | LB | Joe Martin | 1 | 0 | 0 | 0 | 0 | 1 |
| 12 | 4 | (England) | CB | Shaun Hutchinson | 1 | 0 | 0 | 0 | 0 | 1 |
| 12 | 7 | (England) | RM | David Worrall | 1 | 0 | 0 | 0 | 0 | 1 |
| 12 | 17 | (England) | CB | Byron Webster | 1 | 0 | 0 | 0 | 0 | 1 |
| 12 | 26 | (Comoros) | CM | Jimmy Abdou | 0 | 0 | 0 | 1 | 0 | 1 |
| Own Goals | | | | | 0 | 0 | 1 | 0 | 0 | 1 |
| Total | | | | | 64 | 10 | 5 | 7 | 4 | 90 |

==== Disciplinary record ====
As of 4 April 2017

| Rank | No. | Nat. | Po. | Name | Championship | | | FA Cup | | | League Cup | | | League Trophy | | | Total | | | | | | |
| Rank | No. | Nat. | Po. | Name | Yellow card | (yellow card) (yellow-red card) | Red card | Yellow card | (yellow card) (yellow-red card) | Red card | Yellow card | (yellow card) (yellow-red card) | Red card | Yellow card | (yellow card) (yellow-red card) | Red card | Yellow card | (yellow card) (yellow-red card) | Red card | | | | |
|---|---|---|---|---|---|---|---|---|---|---|---|---|---|---|---|---|---|---|---|---|---|---|---|
| 1 | 8 | (England) | CM | Ben Thompson | 9 | 1 | 0 | 1 | 0 | 0 | 0 | 0 | 0 | 0 | 0 | 0 | 10 | 1 | 0 | | | | |
| 1 | 6 | (Republic of Ireland) | DM | Shaun Williams | 9 | 0 | 0 | 0 | 0 | 0 | 0 | 0 | 0 | 1 | 0 | 0 | 1 | 0 | 0 | 11 | 0 | 0 | |
| 3 | 5 | (England) | CB | Tony Craig | 8 | 0 | 0 | 1 | 0 | 0 | 0 | 0 | 0 | 0 | 0 | 0 | 1 | 0 | 0 | 10 | 0 | 0 | |
| 4 | 17 | (England) | CB | Byron Webster | 8 | 0 | 0 | 1 | 0 | 0 | 0 | 0 | 0 | 0 | 0 | 0 | 0 | 0 | 0 | 9 | 0 | 0 | |
| 4 | 20 | (Wales) | CF | Steve Morison | 7 | 0 | 0 | 0 | 0 | 0 | 0 | 0 | 0 | 1 | 0 | 0 | 1 | 0 | 0 | 9 | 0 | 0 | |
| 5 | 3 | (England) | LB | Joe Martin | 7 | 0 | 0 | 0 | 0 | 0 | 1 | 0 | 0 | 0 | 0 | 0 | 0 | 0 | 0 | 8 | 0 | 0 | |
| 5 | 7 | 9 | (England) | CF | Lee Gregory | 6 | 0 | 0 | 0 | 0 | 0 | 0 | 0 | 0 | 1 | 0 | 0 | 0 | 0 | 0 | 7 | 0 | 0 |
| 8 | 18 | (Northern Ireland) | LM | Shane Ferguson | 4 | 0 | 0 | 0 | 0 | 0 | 1 | 0 | 0 | 0 | 0 | 0 | 1 | 0 | 0 | 6 | 0 | 0 | |
| 9 | 16 | (England) | DM | Calum Butcher | 3 | 0 | 0 | 0 | 0 | 0 | 0 | 0 | 0 | 1 | 0 | 0 | 0 | 0 | 0 | 4 | 0 | 0 | |
| 10 | 12 | (Antigua and Barbuda) | RB | Mahlon Romeo | 3 | 0 | 0 | 0 | 0 | 0 | 0 | 0 | 0 | 0 | 0 | 0 | 0 | 0 | 0 | 3 | 0 | 0 | |
| 10 | 14 | (England) | RM | Jed Wallace | 1 | 0 | 0 | 2 | 0 | 0 | 0 | 0 | 0 | 0 | 0 | 0 | 0 | 0 | 0 | 3 | 0 | 0 | |
| 10 | 26 | (Comoros) | CM | Jimmy Abdou | 2 | 0 | 0 | 0 | 0 | 0 | 0 | 0 | 0 | 0 | 0 | 0 | 1 | 0 | 0 | 3 | 0 | 0 | |
| 10 | 30 | (England) | CF | Harry Smith | 2 | 0 | 0 | 0 | 0 | 0 | 0 | 0 | 0 | 1 | 0 | 0 | 0 | 0 | 0 | 3 | 0 | 0 | |
| 15 | 10 | (Nigeria) | LW | Fred Onyedinma | 2 | 0 | 0 | 0 | 0 | 0 | 0 | 0 | 0 | 0 | 0 | 0 | 0 | 0 | 0 | 2 | 0 | 0 | |
| 15 | 22 | (Republic of Ireland) | CF | Aiden O'Brien | 1 | 0 | 0 | 0 | 0 | 0 | 0 | 0 | 0 | 0 | 0 | 0 | 1 | 0 | 0 | 2 | 0 | 0 | |
| 15 | 24 | (England) | CB | Jake Cooper | 1 | 0 | 0 | 0 | 1 | 0 | 0 | 0 | 0 | 0 | 0 | 0 | 0 | 0 | 0 | 1 | 1 | 0 | |
| 18 | 4 | (England) | CB | Shaun Hutchinson | 1 | 0 | 0 | 0 | 0 | 0 | 0 | 0 | 0 | 0 | 0 | 0 | 0 | 0 | 0 | 1 | 0 | 0 | |
| 18 | 7 | (England) | RW | David Worrall | 1 | 0 | 0 | 0 | 0 | 0 | 0 | 0 | 0 | 0 | 0 | 0 | 0 | 0 | 0 | 1 | 0 | 0 | |
| 18 | 31 | (England) | GK | Tom King | 1 | 0 | 0 | 0 | 0 | 0 | 0 | 0 | 0 | 0 | 0 | 0 | 0 | 0 | 0 | 1 | 0 | 0 | |
| 18 | 33 | (England) | LB | Noel Chesmain | 0 | 0 | 0 | 0 | 0 | 0 | 0 | 0 | 0 | 1 | 0 | 0 | 0 | 0 | 0 | 1 | 0 | 0 | |
| Total | | | | | 78 | 1 | 0 | 5 | 1 | 0 | 2 | 0 | 0 | 6 | 0 | 0 | 6 | 0 | 0 | 100 | 2 | 0 | |

== Transfers ==
=== Transfers in ===
| Date from | Position | Nationality | Name | From | Fee | Ref. |
|---|---|---|---|---|---|---|
| 1 July 2016 | CB | (England) | Shaun Hutchinson | Fulham | Free transfer | |
| 1 July 2016 | RM | (England) | David Worrall | Southend United | Free transfer | |
| 1 July 2016 | LW | (Scotland) | Gregg Wylde | Plymouth Argyle | Free transfer | |
| 4 July 2016 | CB | (Republic of Ireland) | Paul Rooney | Bohemians | Free transfer | |
| 9 August 2016 | CF | (England) | Harry Smith | Folkestone Invicta | Undisclosed | |
| 25 August 2016 | DM | (England) | Calum Butcher | Burton Albion | Undisclosed | |

=== Transfers out ===
| Date from | Position | Nationality | Name | To | Fee | Ref. |
|---|---|---|---|---|---|---|
| 1 July 2016 | RM | (Trinidad and Tobago) | Carlos Edwards | Ma Pau (Note: Following Edwards' release, he signed for Ma Pau Stars.) | Released | |
| 1 July 2016 | CF | (England) | John Marquis | Doncaster Rovers (Note: Following Marquis' release, he signed for Doncaster Rovers.) | Released | |
| 1 July 2016 | RW | (England) | Lee Martin | Gillingham (Note: Following Martin's release, he signed for Gillingham.) | Released | |
| 1 July 2016 | CB | (England) | Chris Parr | Free agent | Released | |
| 1 July 2016 | CM | (England) | Jack Powell | Ebbsfleet United (Note: Following Powell's release, he signed for Ebbsfleet United.) | Released | |
| 1 July 2016 | CM | (England) | Ed Upson | Milton Keynes Dons (Note: Following Upson's release, he signed for Milton Keynes Dons.) | Released | |
| 1 July 2016 | CB | (England) | Keaton Wood | Dartford (Note: Following Wood's release, he signed for Dartford.) | Released | |
| 3 July 2016 | CB | (England) | Mark Beevers | Bolton Wanderers | Free transfer | |
| 31 January 2017 | RW | (England) | Paris Cowan-Hall | Wycombe Wanderers (Note: Following Cowan-Hall's release, he signed for Wycombe Wanderers.) | Released | |

=== Loans in ===
| Date from | Position | Nationality | Name | From | Date until | Ref. |
|---|---|---|---|---|---|---|
| 19 January 2017 | CB | (England) | Jake Cooper | Reading | End of Season | |
| 19 January 2017 | RM | (England) | Jed Wallace | Wolverhampton Wanderers | End of Season | |

=== Loans out ===
| Date from | Position | Nationality | Name | To | Date until | Ref. |
|---|---|---|---|---|---|---|
| 1 July 2016 | RW | (England) | Paris Cowan-Hall | Wycombe Wanderers | 1 January 2017 | |
| 29 July 2016 | GK | (Republic of Ireland) | David Forde | Portsmouth | End of season | |
| 16 August 2016 | CF | (England) | Alfie Pavey | Bromley | October 2016 | |
| 21 October 2016 | CF | (England) | Jamie Philpot | Bromley | 17 November 2016 | |
| 8 December 2016 | CB | (Republic of Ireland) | Paul Rooney | Torquay United | 3 February 2017 (Note: On 6 January 2017, Paul Rooney's loan at Torquay United was extended for a further 28 days.) | |
| 1 January 2017 | LM | (Scotland) | Gregg Wylde | Northampton Town | End of season | |
| 4 January 2017 | CB | (England) | Sid Nelson | Newport County | End of season | |
| 5 January 2017 | MF | (Canada) | Kris Twardek | Braintree Town | 2 February 2017 | |
| 20 January 2017 | CF | (England) | Alfie Pavey | Hampton & Richmond Borough | 17 February 2017 | |
