= Aiden O'Brien =

English-born Irish professional footballer (born 1993)

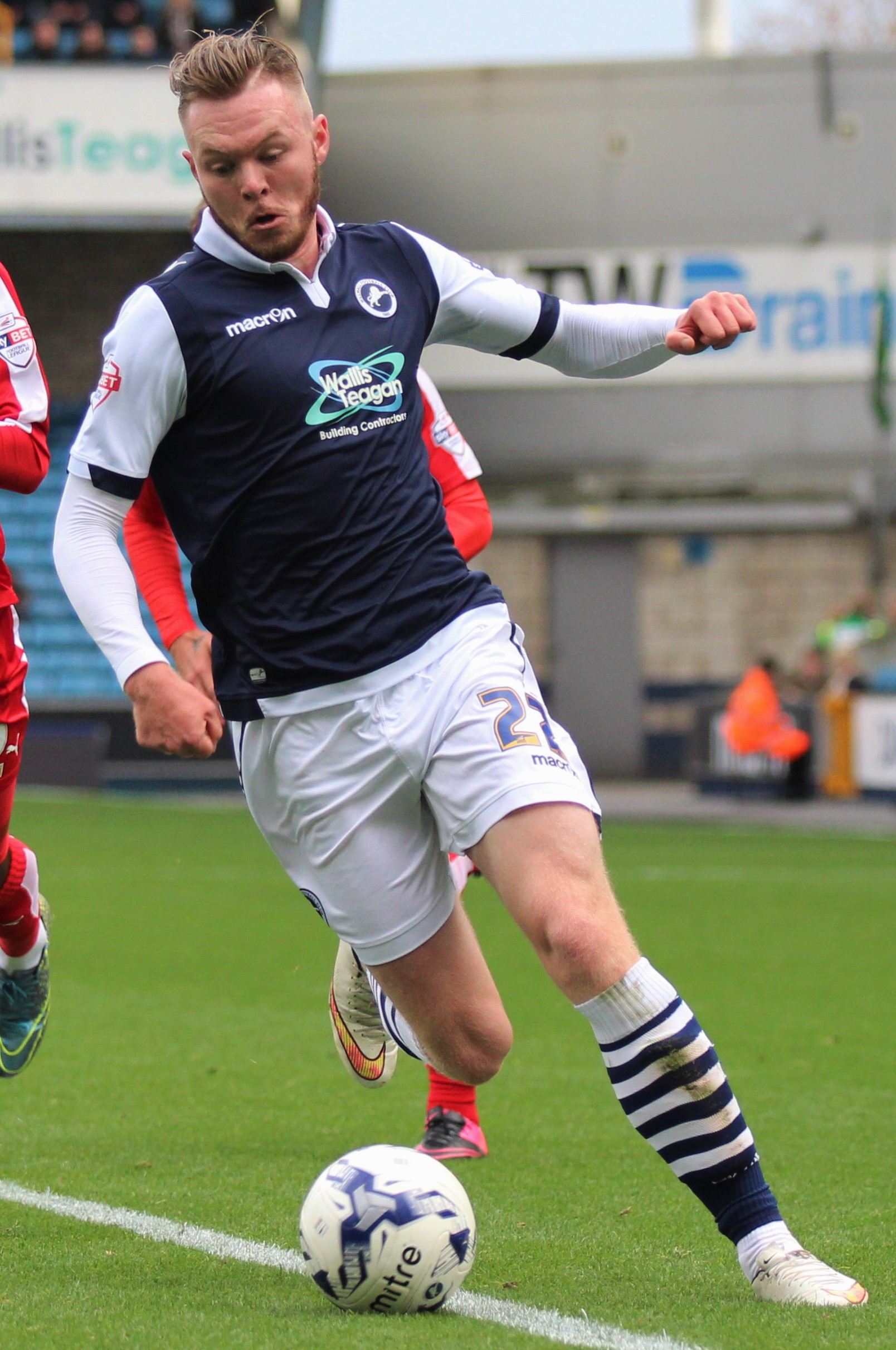
- O'Brien with Millwall in 2015

Personal information
- Full name: Aiden Anthony O'Brien
- Date of birth: 4 October 1993 (age 33)
- Place of birth: Islington, England
- Height: 6 ft 0 in (1.83 m)
- Position: Forward

Team information
- Current team: Woking
- Number: 10

Youth career
- 2009–2011: Millwall

Senior career*
Years	Team	Apps	(Gls)
2011–2020	Millwall	188	(34)
2012	→ Staines Town (loan)	2	(0)
2012	→ Hayes & Yeading United (loan)	7	(0)
2013	→ Crawley Town (loan)	9	(0)
2013–2014	→ Aldershot Town (loan)	5	(3)
2014	→ Torquay United (loan)	3	(0)
2020–2022	Sunderland	45	(5)
2022	Portsmouth	17	(5)
2022–2024	Shrewsbury Town	18	(0)
2023	→ Gillingham (loan)	14	(2)
2023–2024	→ Sutton United (loan)	17	(1)
2024	Shelbourne	8	(1)
2025–	Woking	50	(9)

International career^{‡}
2009–2010	Republic of Ireland U17	5	(3)
2012	Republic of Ireland U19	2	(1)
2013–2014	Republic of Ireland U21	10	(5)
2018–2019	Republic of Ireland	5	(1)
- * Club domestic league appearances and goals as of 20:26, 22 November 2026 (UTC) ‡ National team caps and goals as of 22:54, 28 February 2019 (UTC)

Aiden Anthony O'Brien (born 4 October 1993) is a professional footballer who plays as a forward for National League club Woking. Born in England, he represented the Republic of Ireland national team.

O'Brien began his career with Millwall, who loaned him out to five different clubs. After making 188 league appearances for Millwall, he moved to Sunderland, before moving on to Portsmouth and finally Shrewsbury, where he had two further loan spells.

== Career ==
=== Millwall ===
Born in Islington, London, O'Brien started his career in the youth system at Millwall and signed his first professional contract in 2010 on his 17th birthday. He made his debut for the club in the League Cup third round 5–0 defeat to Wolverhampton Wanderers, coming on as a substitute for Dany N'Guessan. On 1 January 2012, O'Brien signed for Conference South side Staines Town on a one-month loan.

A month later, O'Brien signed for Conference Premier side Hayes and Yeading on a one-month loan and immediately found himself playing games.

In May 2014, O'Brien agreed a new two-year deal with Millwall with the 20-year-old being highly regarded by Millwall manager Ian Holloway.

O'Brien made his first appearance of the 2014–15 season coming on as a substitute for Richard Chaplow against Southampton in the League Cup. The game finished 2–0 to Southampton. A month later, in September 2014, he made his first league appearance for Millwall in a 3–1 defeat to Birmingham City. O'Brien spoke of his delight of fulfilling a lifelong ambition when he made his league debut for Millwall and has dedicated the achievement to his father.

At the end of the 2017–18 season, his contract was extended by Millwall after the club exercised an option. He left Millwall at the end of 2019–2020 season, after his contract expired.

=== Sunderland ===
On 30 July 2020, O'Brien signed for Sunderland, on a two-year deal. On 8 September 2020 he scored his first goal for Sunderland in an EFL Trophy tie against Aston Villa U21s.

On 24 August 2021, O'Brien scored a hat-trick against Blackpool in the second round of the EFL Cup. His third goal came in the first minute of stoppage time to secure a dramatic 3–2 victory, earning him the "Player of the Round" award.

=== Portsmouth ===
On 31 January 2022, O'Brien joined EFL League One side Portsmouth on a free transfer. He scored his first goal for the club against Doncaster Rovers on 12 February 2022.

=== Shrewsbury Town ===
Despite being offered a new contract by Portsmouth, O'Brien opted to sign a two-year deal with fellow EFL League One side Shrewsbury Town.

O'Brien warming up before a Gillingham match in 2023

On the last day of the January 2023 transfer window O'Brien signed for EFL League Two side Gillingham on loan for the remainder of the 2022–23 season.

On 1 August 2023, O'Brien signed for League Two club Sutton United on loan until January 2024.

He was released by Shrewsbury at the end of the 2023–24 season.

=== Shelbourne ===
On 12 August 2024, O'Brien signed for League of Ireland Premier Division club Shelbourne on a multi-year contract. On 31 December 2024, it was announced that O'Brien had departed the club.

=== Woking ===
On 4 January 2025, O'Brien joined National League club Woking on a short-term contract until the end of the season.

== International career ==
On 6 February 2013, O'Brien scored on his debut for the Republic of Ireland U21s against Netherlands in a 3–0 win at Tallaght Stadium. O'Brien then scored his first competitive goal and his third goal for Ireland in 4–1 away win against the Faroe Islands. On 15 November 2013, O'Brien scored another two goals against the Faroe Islands in a 5–2 win at The Showgrounds.

O'Brien scored five times for the U21s, placing him two goals off Robbie Brady's all time goal scoring record of seven.

In September 2017, O'Brien was called up to the senior Republic of Ireland squad for 2018 FIFA World Cup qualifiers against Moldova and Wales.

On 11 September 2018, O'Brien scored his first senior international goal for Ireland on his debut in a friendly against Poland in Wrocław which finished 1–1. The goal would later be named as the 2018 FAI International Goal of the Year.

== Career statistics ==
=== Club ===
As of match played 21 November 2026

Appearances and goals by club, season and competition
Club	Season	League			National Cup		League Cup		Other		Total	
Club	Season	Division	Apps	Goals	Apps	Goals	Apps	Goals	Apps	Goals	Apps	Goals
Millwall	2011–12	Championship	0	0	0	0	1	0	—		1	0
Millwall	2012–13	Championship	0	0	0	0	0	0	—		0	0
Millwall	2013–14	Championship	0	0	0	0	0	0	—		0	0
Millwall	2014–15	Championship	19	2	0	0	1	0	—		20	2
Millwall	2015–16	League One	43	10	2	1	0	0	8 (Note: Six appearances and two goals in Football League Trophy, two in League One play-offs)	2	53	13
Millwall	2016–17	League One	43	13	6	1	2	1	6 (Note: Three appearances in EFL Trophy, three in League One play-offs)	0	57	15
Millwall	2017–18	Championship	30	4	1	2	1	0	—		32	6
Millwall	2018–19	Championship	35	2	4	1	3	1	—		42	4
Millwall	2019–20	Championship	18	3	1	0	2	1	—		21	4
Millwall	Total		188	34	14	5	10	3	14	2	226	44
Staines Town (loan)	2011–12	Conference South	2	0	—		—		1 (Note: Appearances in FA Trophy)	0	3	0
Hates & Yeading United (loan)	2011–12	Conference Premier	7	0	—		—		—		7	0
Crawley Town (loan)	2012–13	League One	9	0	—		—		—		9	0
Aldershot Town (loan)	2013–14	Conference Premier	5	3	—		—		4	4	9	7
Torquay United (loan)	2013–14	League Two	3	0	—		—		—		3	0
Sunderland	2020–21	League One	32	4	1	0	1	0	7 (Note: Six appearances and two goals in the EFL Trophy, one appearance in the League One play-offs)	2	41	6
Sunderland	2021–22	League One	7	1	0	0	3	4	2 (Note: Appearance(s) in the EFL Trophy)	0	12	5
Sunderland	Total		39	5	1	0	4	4	9	2	53	11
Portsmouth	2021–22	League One	17	5	0	0	0	0	0	0	17	5
Shrewsbury Town	2022–23	League One	6	0	1	0	0	0	1	0	8	0
Shrewsbury Town	2023–24	League One	12	0	—		—		—		12	0
Shrewsbury Town	Total		18	0	1	0	0	0	1	0	20	0
Gillingham (loan)	2022–23	League Two	14	2	0	0	0	0	0	0	14	2
Sutton United (loan)	2023–24	League Two	23	1	2	0	3	1	1	0	29	2
Shelbourne	2024	LOI Premier Division	8	1	2	1	—		—		10	2
Woking	2024–25	National League	9	3	—		—		4 (Note: One appearance in National League Cup, three appearances and goal in FA Trophy)	1	13	4
Woking	2025–26	National League	25	3	0	0	—		6 (Note: Two appearances in National League Cup, four appearances and one goal in FA Trophy)	1	31	4
Woking	2026–27	National League	16	3	1	0	—		3 (Note: Appearance(s) in National League Cup)	1	20	4
Woking	Total		50	9	1	0	—		13	3	64	12
Career total			378	57	21	6	17	8	43	11	459	82

=== International ===
Scores and results list Republic of Ireland's goal tally first, score column indicates score after each O'Brien goal.

List of international goals scored by Aiden O'Brien
No.	Date	Venue	Opponent	Score	Result	Competition
1	11 September 2018	Stadion Miejski, Wrocław, Poland	Poland	1–0	1–1	Friendly

== Honours ==
Millwall

- EFL League One play-offs: 2017

Sunderland

- EFL Trophy: 2020–21

Individual

- EFL League One Player of the Month: October 2015
- FAI International Goal of the Year: 2018

Shelbourne

- League of Ireland Premier Division: 2024

== See also ==
- List of Republic of Ireland international footballers born outside the Republic of Ireland
