= George Saville =

Northern Irish footballer (born 1993)

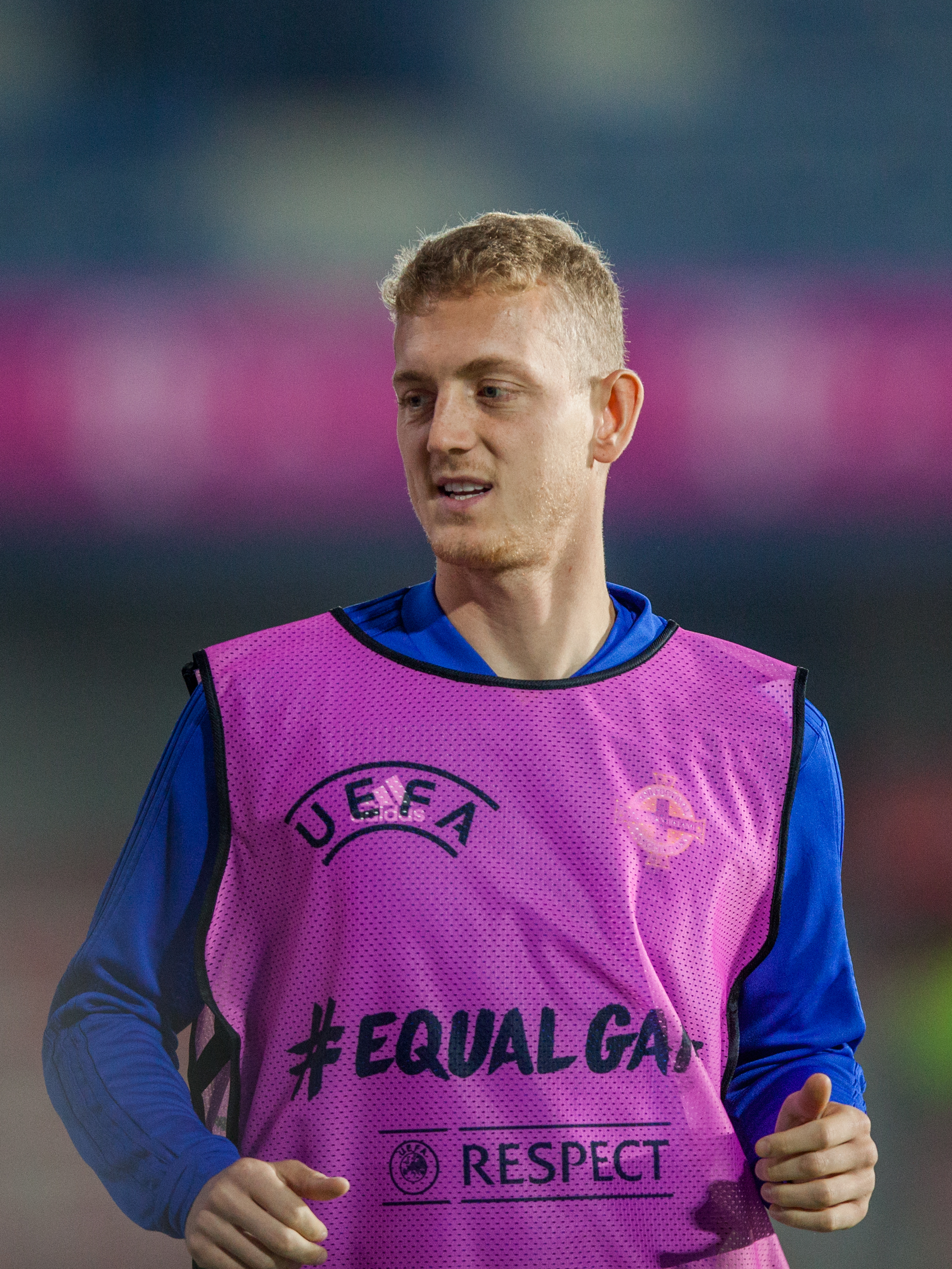
- Saville in 2019

Personal information
- Full name: George Alan Saville
- Date of birth: 1 June 1993 (age 33)
- Place of birth: Camberley, England
- Height: 5 ft 9 in (1.76 m)
- Position: Midfielder

Team information
- Current team: Bromley
- Number: 6

Youth career
- –2004: Reading
- 2004–2011: Chelsea

Senior career*
Years	Team	Apps	(Gls)
2011–2014	Chelsea	0	(0)
2013	→ Millwall (loan)	3	(0)
2013–2014	→ Brentford (loan)	40	(4)
2014–2017	Wolverhampton Wanderers	50	(6)
2015	→ Bristol City (loan)	7	(1)
2015	→ Millwall (loan)	12	(0)
2017–2019	Millwall	48	(10)
2018–2019	→ Middlesbrough (loan)	16	(2)
2019–2021	Middlesbrough	97	(9)
2021–2025	Millwall	164	(7)
2025–2026	Luton Town	39	(2)
2026–	Bromley	2	(0)

International career^{‡}
2017–	Northern Ireland	64	(0)
- * Club domestic league appearances and goals as of 11:21, 11 September 2026 (UTC) ‡ National team caps and goals as of 18:43, 16 October 2026 (UTC)

George Alan Saville (born 1 June 1993) is a professional footballer who plays as a midfielder for EFL League One club Bromley and the Northern Ireland national team.

Saville began his senior career with Chelsea but did not make a first team appearance. His first professional games came on loan at Millwall and Brentford respectively. George is the younger brother of fellow Chelsea youth product Jack Saville.

== Club career ==
=== Chelsea ===
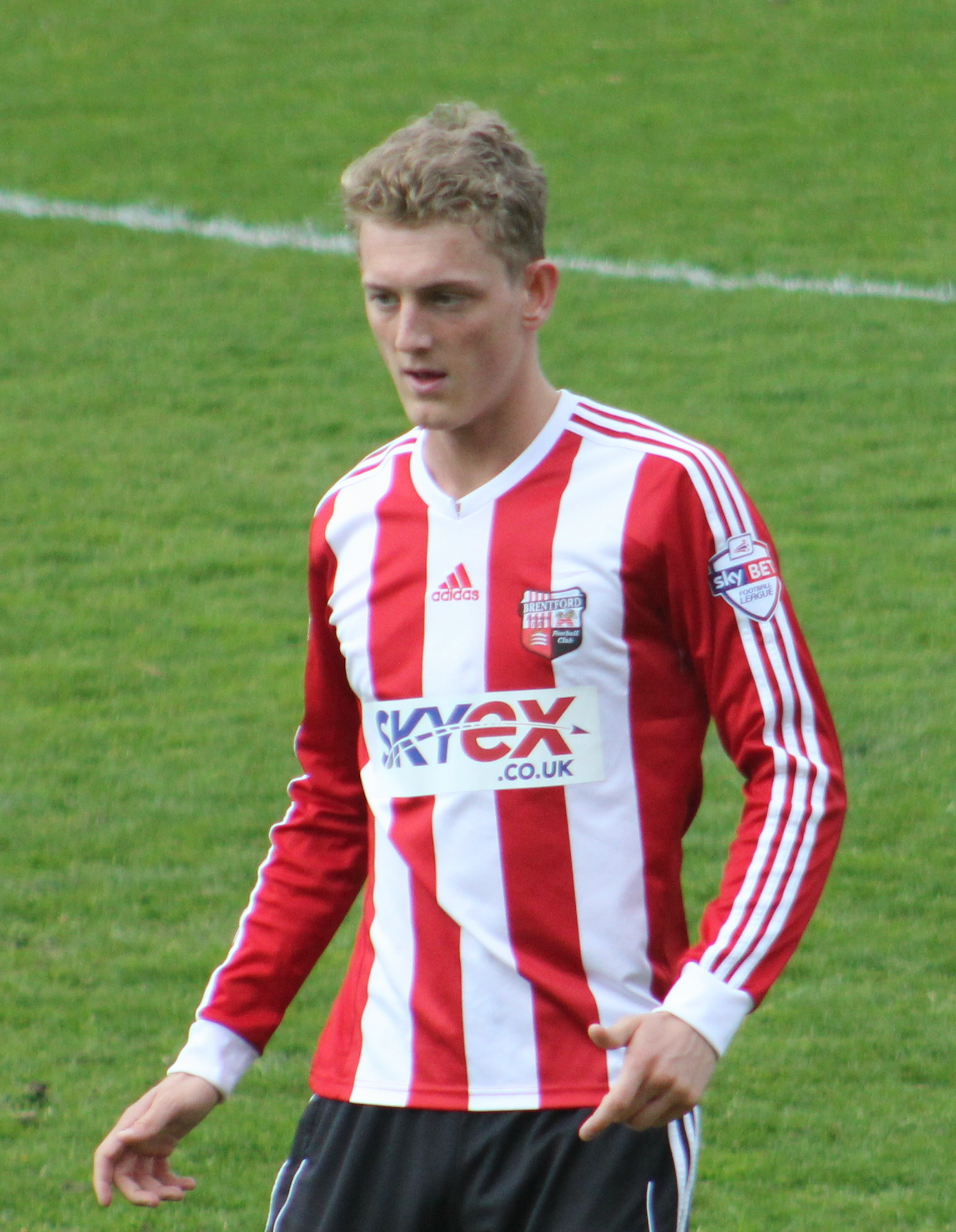
Saville playing for Brentford in 2014.

Born in Camberley, Saville came through the Chelsea Academy, having been there since 2004, when Brendan Rodgers came to Chelsea from Reading. His older brother Jack also joined Chelsea. He was part of the Chelsea reserve side that won the FA Youth Cup in 2010, having first played at that level on 23 March 2010 in a 2–1 Premier Reserve League South defeat against Fulham. In July 2010 he signed his first professional contract but only featured in reserve team action, winning the 2010–11 Premier Reserve League after a play-off victory over Blackburn.

He signed a new three-and-a-half-year contract in January 2012, and ended the year with his first involvement with the first team: Appearing as an unused substitute in two League Cup ties and also during the Club World Cup in Japan.

In February 2013, Saville joined Championship side Millwall on a loan deal until the end of the season. Here, he made his senior debut on 2 March against Leeds United. He made two further appearances for the Lions during this spell.

During the close season, Saville was again loaned out, this time joining League One club Brentford until 5 January 2014. He made his Brentford debut on the opening day of the 2013–14 season in a 1–1 draw at Port Vale. and scored his first senior goal on 19 October, in a 3–1 victory over Colchester United. With Brentford chasing promotion, Saville's performances saw new manager Mark Warburton extend the loan until the end of the season.

His performance against promotion rivals Leyton Orient on 15 March garnered him the man of the match award and a place in the Football League Team of the Week. By the end of the season, Saville had made 44 appearances and scored four goals to help Brentford win automatic promotion to the Championship.

=== Wolverhampton Wanderers ===
On 26 August 2014, Saville left Chelsea to join with Championship side Wolverhampton Wanderers on a permanent transfer having never made an appearance for the Blues' first team. He signed a three-year deal (with the option of a further year) for a fee of £1million. Here, he reunited with manager Kenny Jackett who gave Saville his senior debut while at Millwall. Saville made his club debut on 30 August 2014 as a substitute in a 3–1 win against Blackburn.

On 14 January 2015, having largely fallen out of Wolves' first team involvement, Saville was moved on a 93-day loan to League One side Bristol City. Saville made his Bristol City debut against Scunthorpe United on 17 January. He scored his first goal for Bristol City versus Yeovil Town on 10 March. His final appearance at the club came against Bradford City on 14 April, a match his side won 0–6. In total, he made eight appearances, scoring once, for Bristol City before returning to his parent club. He also helped them win the 2014-15 Football League Trophy, for the final of which he was on the bench.

After making two League Cup appearances for Wolves in the early season, Saville again went out on loan. On 6 October, he rejoined Millwall on a 28-day emergency loan. He returned to his parent club to end the season with five goals – his best goalscoring tally to date – from 21 appearances.

The following season saw Saville regularly involved under the management of Paul Lambert, ending with a total of 29 appearances in all competitions (scoring once). Although the club activated the option of a further year on his contract at the conclusion of the campaign, he would not play for them again.

=== Millwall ===
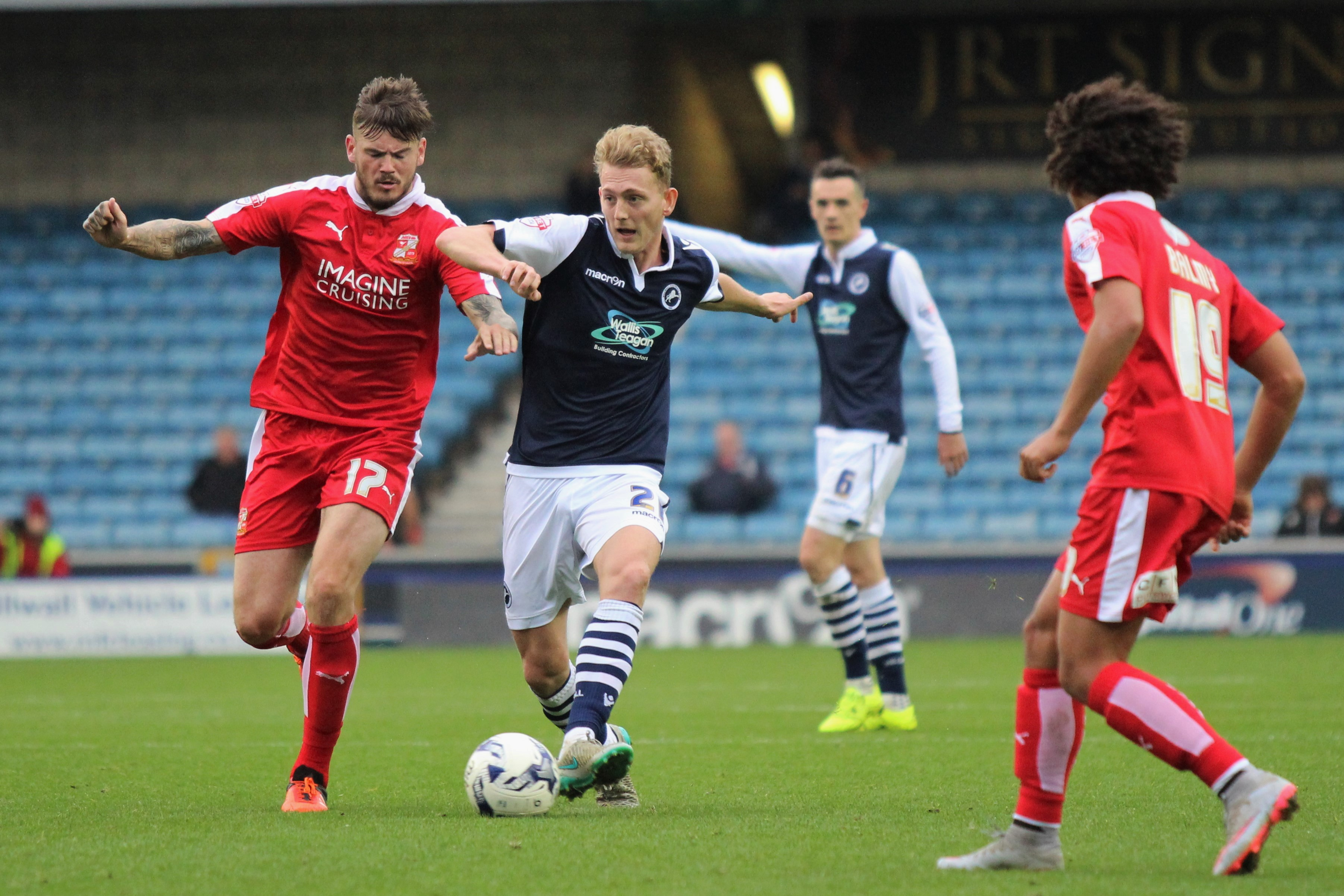
Saville playing for Millwall in 2015.

On 26 June 2017, Saville joined his former loan club Millwall on a permanent three-year deal for an undisclosed fee. He scored his first goal for Millwall in a 1–1 draw with Bolton Wanderers on 12 August 2017. He scored 10 goals for Millwall from midfield during the 2017/18 season, finishing joint top scorer with Lee Gregory, helping them narrowly miss out on the playoff positions by finishing 8th.

=== Middlesbrough ===
On 31 August 2018, Saville joined fellow Championship club Middlesbrough on loan until January 2019, to join the club on a permanent deal at the conclusion of the loan spell, for a reported transfer fee of £8million. After returning from the international break with Northern Ireland, Saville made his first official appearance for his new side on 15 September, coming on a substitute for fellow newly signed midfielder Muhamed Besic, in their unfortunate close 1–0 defeat to Norwich City. He made his first start for the Smoggies in their following fixture four days later against Bolton Wanderers, which saw Saville score his first goal for the club in their 2–0 success, before being substituted off later on in the match, with Besic coming on to finish off the game.

=== Return to Millwall ===
In July 2021 Saville rejoined Millwall on a long-term contract for an undisclosed fee.

He was offered a new contract by the club at the end of the 2024–25 season, however an agreement could not be reached and he subsequently departed the club.

=== Luton Town ===
On 11 June 2025, Saville agreed to join League One side Luton Town. He scored his first goal for the club on 19 August against Wigan Athletic, a match which Luton Town won 1–0.

== International career ==
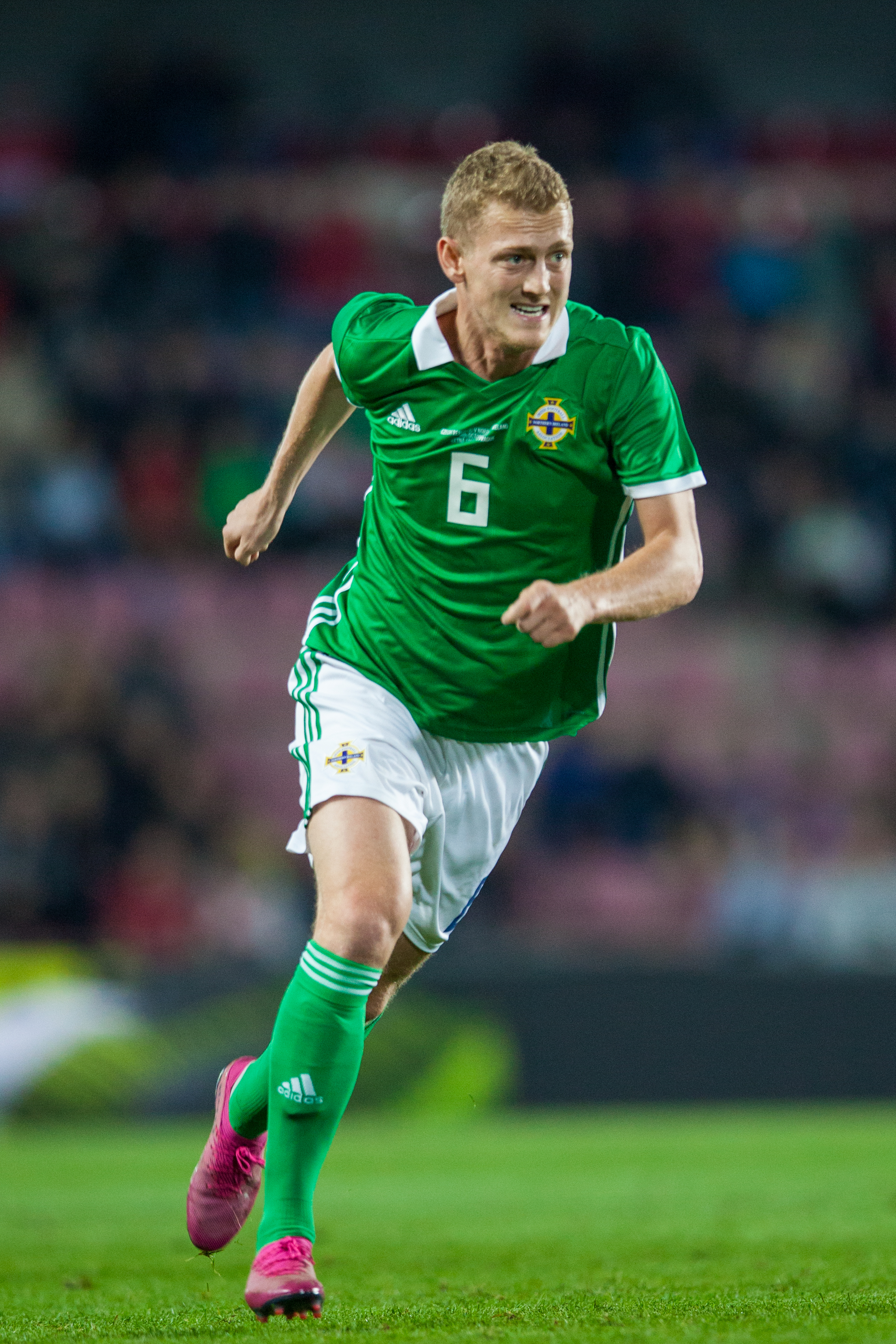
Saville playing for Northern Ireland in 2019.

In September 2017 he was called up to the senior Northern Ireland squad for 2018 FIFA World Cup qualifiers against Germany and Norway. Saville was eligible for Northern Ireland through his grandmother who was from Enniskillen He made his debut in a 1–3 loss against Germany on 5 October 2017, coming on in the 80th minute of the match.

== Style of play ==
Saville is a box-to-box midfielder, known for his ludicrous energy, he also can play in a False 10 position. He was also used in an unfamiliar left back position at times during his spell at Wolverhampton Wanderers.

== Career statistics ==
=== Club ===
As of match played 7 September 2026

Appearances and goals by club, season and competition
Club	Season	League			FA Cup		League Cup		Other		Total	
Club	Season	Division	Apps	Goals	Apps	Goals	Apps	Goals	Apps	Goals	Apps	Goals
Chelsea	2011–12	Premier League	0	0	0	0	0	0	0	0	0	0
Chelsea	2012–13	Premier League	0	0	—		0	0	0	0	0	0
Chelsea	2013–14	Premier League	0	0	—		—		0	0	0	0
Chelsea	Total		0	0	0	0	0	0	0	0	0	0
Millwall (loan)	2012–13	Championship	3	0	0	0	—		—		3	0
Brentford (loan)	2013–14	League One	40	3	2	0	0	0	2 (Note: Appearances in the Football League Trophy)	0	44	3
Wolverhampton Wanderers	2014–15	Championship	7	0	0	0	0	0	—		7	0
Wolverhampton Wanderers	2015–16	Championship	19	5	0	0	2	0	—		21	5
Wolverhampton Wanderers	2016–17	Championship	24	1	3	0	2	0	—		29	1
Wolverhampton Wanderers	Total		50	6	3	0	4	0	0	0	57	6
Bristol City (loan)	2014–15	League One	7	1	1	0	—		0	0	8	1
Millwall (loan)	2015–16	League One	12	0	—		—		3	0	15	0
Wolverhampton Wanderers U23	2016–17	—			—		—		1 (Note: Appearances in the EFL Trophy)	0	1	0
Millwall	2017–18	Championship	44	10	0	0	1	0	—		45	10
Millwall	2018–19	Championship	4	0	—		—		—		4	0
Millwall	Total		48	10	0	0	1	0	—		49	10
Middlesbrough	2018–19	Championship	34	4	1	0	1	0	—		36	4
Middlesbrough	2019–20	Championship	37	1	2	1	1	0	—		40	2
Middlesbrough	2020–21	Championship	42	6	0	0	0	0	—		42	6
Middlesbrough	Total		113	11	3	1	2	0	—		118	12
Millwall	2021–22	Championship	37	2	1	0	2	1	—		40	3
Millwall	2022–23	Championship	42	2	1	0	1	0	—		44	2
Millwall	2023–24	Championship	40	2	0	0	1	0	—		41	2
Millwall	2024–25	Championship	45	1	2	0	2	0	—		49	1
Millwall	Total		164	7	4	0	6	1	0	0	174	8
Luton Town	2025–26	League One	39	2	2	0	0	0	3	0	43	2
Bromley	2026–27	League One	2	0	0	0	—		0	0	2	0
Career total			478	40	15	1	13	1	9	0	514	42

=== International ===
As of match played 31 March 2026

Appearances and goals by national team and year
National team	Year	Apps	Goals
Northern Ireland	2017	4	0
Northern Ireland	2018	7	0
Northern Ireland	2019	10	0
Northern Ireland	2020	5	0
Northern Ireland	2021	9	0
Northern Ireland	2022	7	0
Northern Ireland	2023	9	0
Northern Ireland	2024	5	0
Northern Ireland	2025	7	0
Northern Ireland	2026	1	0
Total		64	0

== Honours ==
Bristol City

- Football League Trophy: 2014–15

Luton Town

- EFL Trophy: 2025–26
