= Kyron Farrell =

Footballer

Personal information
- Full name: Kyron Cassius Daniel Farrell
- Date of birth: 10 May 1996 (age 30)
- Place of birth: Islington, England
- Height: 1.80 m (5 ft 11 in)
- Position: Midfielder

Youth career
- –2016: Millwall

Senior career*
| Years | Team | Apps | (Gls) |
| 2016–2017 | Millwall | 0 | (0) |
| 2017 | → Braintree Town (loan) | 10 | (0) |
| 2017–2018 | Concord Rangers | 27 | (2) |
| 2018 | Cray Wanderers | 7 | (1) |
| 2018–2019 | Walton Casuals | 37 | (2) |
| 2019–2022 | Hampton & Richmond Borough | 61 | (7) |
| 2022–2023 | Braintree Town | 39 | (1) |

International career^{‡}
- Republic of Ireland U19
- * Club domestic league appearances and goals as of 19:14, 1 May 2023 (UTC) ‡ National team caps and goals as of 7 September 2015

Kyron Cassius Daniel Farrell (born 10 May 1996) is a professional footballer who last played for Braintree Town as a midfielder. Born in England, he has represented the Republic of Ireland at youth level.

== Club career ==
Farrell began his career with Millwall, signing a professional contract in May 2016.

He moved on loan to Braintree Town in January 2017.

On 15 June 2017, it was announced that Farrell would join National League South side Concord Rangers following his release from Millwall. He moved to Cray Wanderers in March 2018.

He spent the 2018–19 season with Walton Casuals.

Following a three-year spell with Hampton & Richmond Borough, Farrell returned to Braintree Town in August 2022.

== International career ==
Born in England, Farrell was an Irish youth international at the under-19 level.

== Career statistics ==
As of 3 May 2023

Appearances and goals by club, season and competition
| Club | Season | League | | | FA Cup | | League Cup | | Other | | Total | |
| Club | Season | Division | Apps | Goals | Apps | Goals | Apps | Goals | Apps | Goals | Apps | Goals |
|---|---|---|---|---|---|---|---|---|---|---|---|---|
| Millwall | 2015–16 | League One | 0 | 0 | 0 | 0 | 0 | 0 | 0 | 0 | 0 | 0 |
| Millwall | 2016–17 | League One | 0 | 0 | 0 | 0 | 0 | 0 | 1 (Note: Appearance in the EFL Trophy) | 0 | 1 | 0 |
| Millwall | Total | | 0 | 0 | 0 | 0 | 0 | 0 | 1 | 0 | 1 | 0 |
| Braintree Town (loan) | 2016–17 | National League | 10 | 0 | 0 | 0 | — | | 2 (Note: Appearances in the FA Trophy) | 0 | 12 | 0 |
| Concord Rangers | 2017–18 | National League South | 27 | 2 | 4 | 1 | — | | 1 | 0 | 32 | 3 |
| Cray Wanderers | 2017–18 | Isthmian League South Division | 7 | 1 | — | | — | | 1 (Note: Appearance in the Isthmian League South Division play-offs) | 0 | 8 | 1 |
| Walton Casuals | 2018–19 | Southern League Premier Division South | 37 | 2 | 3 | 0 | — | | 5 (Note: Two appearances and two goals in the Southern League Cup, three appearances in the FA Trophy) | 2 | 45 | 4 |
| Hampton & Richmond Borough | 2019–20 | National League South | 20 | 2 | 0 | 0 | — | | 4 | 0 | 24 | 2 |
| Hampton & Richmond Borough | 2020–21 | National League South | 16 | 0 | 4 | 0 | — | | 0 | 0 | 20 | 0 |
| Hampton & Richmond Borough | 2021–22 | National League South | 25 | 5 | 3 | 0 | — | | 0 | 0 | 28 | 5 |
| Hampton & Richmond Borough | Total | | 61 | 7 | 7 | 0 | — | | 4 | 0 | 72 | 7 |
| Braintree Town | 2022–23 | National League South | 39 | 1 | 2 | 0 | — | | 4 (Note: Three appearances in the FA Trophy, one in the National League South play-offs) | 0 | 45 | 1 |
| Career total | | | 181 | 13 | 16 | 1 | 0 | 0 | 18 | 2 | 215 | 16 |
