= 2009 Football League One play-off final =

Association football match

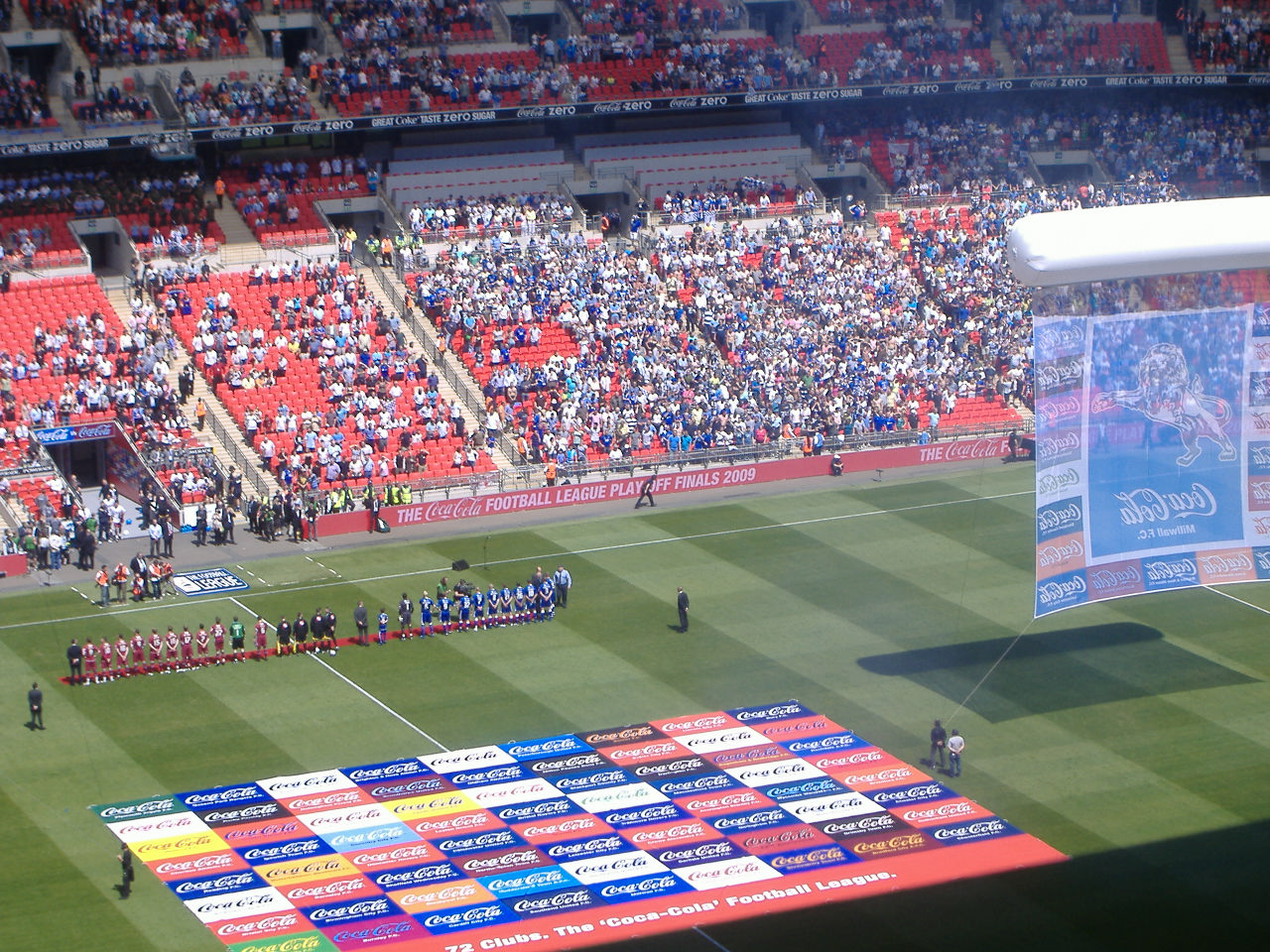
Millwall	Scunthorpe United
2	3
- Date: 24 May 2009
- Venue: Wembley Stadium, London
- Referee: Michael Oliver (Northumberland)
- Attendance: 59,661
- Weather: Sunny

The 2009 Football League One play-off final was an association football match which was played on 24 May 2009 at Wembley Stadium, London, between Millwall and Scunthorpe United to determine the third and final team to gain promotion from Football League One to the Football League Championship. The top two teams of the 2008–09 Football League One season, Leicester City and Peterborough United, gained automatic promotion to the Championship, while those placed from third to sixth in the table took part in play-off semi-finals. The winners of these semi-finals competed for the final place for the 2009–10 season in the Championship. The losing semi-finalists were Milton Keynes Dons and Leeds United.

The game was played in front of 59,661 spectators and was refereed by Michael Oliver. In the 6th minute, Matt Sparrow put Scunthorpe ahead with a right-footed shot into the top-left corner of the Millwall goal from around 6 yards (5.5 m). Gary Alexander levelled the match with a long-range strike in the 37th minute. Two minutes later, he doubled his tally with a header into the bottom-left corner of the Scunthorpe goal from 12 yards (11 m). With 20 minutes remaining, Sparrow struck from around 20 yards (18 m) to restore parity at 2–2 and 15 minutes later, Martyn Woolford put Scunthorpe ahead with a left-footed strike from 12 yards (11 m). The final score was 3–2 to Scunthorpe who were promoted to the Championship.

Scunthorpe's next season saw them finish in 20th position, two places above the relegation zone. Millwall ended their following season in third place in the table to qualify for the play-offs where they defeated Swindon Town in the final.

== Route to the final ==
Football League One final table, leading positions
Pos	Team	Pld	W	D	L	GF	GA	GD	Pts
1	Leicester City	46	27	15	4	84	39	+45	96
2	Peterborough United	46	26	11	9	78	54	+24	89
3	Milton Keynes Dons	46	26	9	11	83	47	+36	87
4	Leeds United	46	26	6	14	77	49	+28	84
5	Millwall	46	25	7	14	63	53	+10	82
6	Scunthorpe United	46	22	10	14	82	63	+19	76

Millwall finished the regular 2008–09 season in fifth place in Football League One, the third tier of the English football league system, one position ahead of Scunthorpe United. Both therefore missed out on the two automatic places for promotion to the Football League Championship and instead took part in the play-offs to determine the third promoted team. Millwall finished seven points behind Peterborough United (who were promoted in second place) and fourteen behind league winners Leicester City. Scunthorpe United ended the season six points behind Millwall.

Scunthorpe United's opponents in their play-off semi-final were Milton Keynes Dons and the first match of the two-legged tie took place at Glanford Park in Scunthorpe on 8 May 2009. A volley from Martyn Woolford put the home side into the lead early in the match after Willy Guéret failed to properly clear a shot from Paul Hayes. Aaron Wilbraham scored the equaliser with a header in the 27th minute: no further goals were scored and the match ended 1–1. The second leg of the semi-final was held a week later at Stadium MK in Milton Keynes. Regular time ended goalless, sending the match into extra time where the closest chance fell to David Mirfin whose shot struck the Millwall goalpost. With the tie ending 1–1 on aggregate, a penalty shootout was required to decide the winners. The first six penalties were scored before Cliff Byrne missed his for Scunthorpe. Jason Puncheon's spot kick was then saved but with the next two penalties being scored, the shootout went to sudden death. Matt Sparrow and Jude Stirling both missed before the next four were scored. Ian Morris converted his side's ninth penalty and then Tore André Flo missed to give Scunthorpe a 7–6 penalty win.

In the second play-off final, Millwall faced Leeds United with the first leg being played at the New Den on 9 May 2009. After a goalless first half, Neil Harris scored in the 70th minute from a Gary Alexander cross to give Millwall a one-goal lead to take into the second leg. The second leg, at Elland Road in Leeds, took place five days later. Millwall goalkeeper David Forde made a double-save from Jermaine Beckford and Fabian Delph before denying Beckford's second-half penalty after Sam Sodje was pulled back in the area by Andy Frampton. In the 53rd minute, Leeds took the lead when Luciano Becchio scored from a Ben Parker cross to level the aggregate score. Lewis Grabban then passed to Djimi Abdou who scored from close range to make it 1–1 on the day. With no further goals, Millwall won the tie 2–1 on aggregate and progressed to the final.

== Match ==
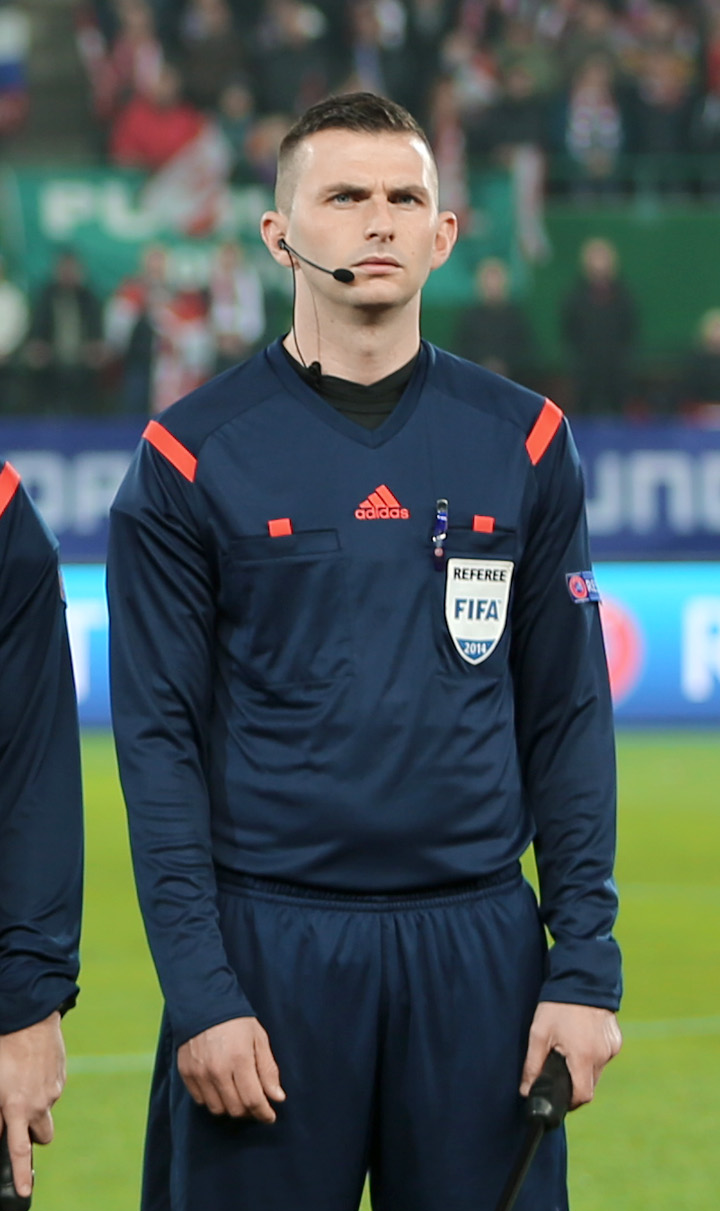
Michael Oliver (pictured in 2014) officiated the final the day after his father Clive had refereed the League Two play-off final.

=== Background ===
Scunthorpe had played in League One for a single season having been relegated from the Championship in the 2007–08 season. They had featured in the play-offs six times, including four times in five years between 1988 and 1992, but had reached the final just twice. In 1992, they lost in a penalty shootout to Blackpool in the final of the fourth tier play-offs at the old Wembley Stadium before gaining promotion to the third tier with victory over Leyton Orient in the 1999 Football League Third Division play-off final. Earlier in the season, Scunthorpe had already played at the renovated Wembley Stadium in the Football League Trophy Final, where they lost 3–2 to Luton Town after extra time. Millwall had played in League One since being relegated in the 2005–06 season. They had qualified for play-offs four times since the inception of the post-season competition but had failed to progress beyond the semi-finals on any occasion. In the two games between the sides during the regular season, Scunthorpe had won both, with a 3–2 victory at home in October 2008 and a 2–1 win at the New Den the following January. Scunthorpe's top scorer for the regular season was Gary Hooper with 28 goals (24 in the league and 4 in the FA Cup) followed by Hayes with 16 (all in the league). Alexander led the scoring charts for Millwall with 13 goals (11 in the league, 2 in the FA Cup) followed by Harris on 10 (8 in the league, 2 in the FA Cup).

The referee for the match was the 23-year-old Michael Oliver. The day before the League One play-off final, his father, Clive Oliver, refereed the League Two play-off final. It was anticipated by Mikey Stafford in The Observer that around 45,000 Millwall supporters would attend the match, outnumbering their opposition fans by four-to-one. The match was broadcast live in the UK on Sky Sports. Millwall were considered narrow favourites to win promotion according to bookmakers. Scunthorpe's Hooper was expected to be fit following a groin injury but Ben May was unavailable with a damaged thigh.

=== Summary ===
The match kicked off around 1 p.m. on 24 May 2009 in front of 59,661 spectators. In the 6th minute, Sparrow put Scunthorpe ahead with a right-footed shot into the top-left corner of the Millwall goal from around 6 yards (5.5 m). Four minutes later, Scunthorpe's Sam Togwell became the first player to be shown a yellow card for unsporting behaviour. On 16 minutes, Sparrow was also booked, also for unsporting behaviour. Alexander levelled the match with a long-range strike in the 37th minute. Two minutes later, Alexander doubled his tally with a header into the bottom-left corner of the Scunthorpe goal from 12 yards (11 m). The referee blew the whistle to signify half-time with the score at 2–1.

Millwall made the first substitution of the match at the interval when Abdou was replaced by Marc Laird. Nine minutes later, Scunthorpe's Togwell was substituted for Liam Trotter. In the 63rd minute, Chris Hackett came on for Grabban. With 20 minutes remaining, Sparrow struck from around 20 yards (18 m) to restore parity at 2–2. Ten minutes later, Scunthorpe's Forte came on for Hooper before Millwall's Tony Craig was shown a yellow card for unsporting behaviour. In the 85th minute, Woolford put Scunthorpe ahead with a left-footed strike from 12 yards (11 m). In the last minute Millwall made their final substitution with Paul Robinson coming on for Frampton. The referee blew for full time with the final score 3–2 to Scunthorpe who were promoted to the Championship.

=== Details ===
24 May 2009
13:00

Millwall	2–3	Scunthorpe United
Alexander 37', 39'	Report	Sparrow 6', 70'; Woolford 85'

Wembley Stadium, London
Attendance: 59,661
Referee: Michael Oliver (Northumberland)

Millwall	Scunthorpe United

GK	1	David Forde
RB	7	Alan Dunne
CB	15	Tony Craig	(yellow card) 83'
CB	6	Zak Whitbread
LB	3	Andy Frampton		(substituted off) 90'
RM	10	Lewis Grabban		(substituted off) 63'
CM	32	Adam Bolder
CM	26	Jimmy Abdou		(substituted off) 46'
LM	21	David Martin
CF	9	Neil Harris
CF	8	Gary Alexander
Substitutes:
GK	40	Lenny Pidgeley
DF	5	Paul Robinson		(substituted on) 90'
DF	16	Scott Barron
MF	12	Chris Hackett		(substituted on) 63'
MF	24	Marc Laird		(substituted on) 46'
Manager:
Kenny Jackett

GK	1	Joe Murphy
RB	6	Cliff Byrne
CB	15	David Mirfin
CB	4	Andy Crosby
LB	27	Ian Morris
RM	7	Matt Sparrow	(yellow card) 16'
CM	18	Sam Togwell	(yellow card) 10'	(substituted off) 55'
CM	17	Grant McCann
LM	16	Martyn Woolford
CF	10	Gary Hooper		(substituted off) 80'
CF	9	Paul Hayes
Substitutes:
GK	22	Josh Lillis
MF	8	Garry Thompson
MF	24	Andrew Wright
MF	32	Liam Trotter		(substituted on) 55'
FW	19	Jonathan Forte (substituted on) 80'
Manager:
Nigel Adkins

== Post-match ==
Nigel Adkins, the winning manager and former club physiotherapist, noted: "In the end fortunes favoured us and we've got the result we needed. At the end of the day it was one game of football for the whole season ... This season I've thought this is the transition from being physio and I've put a suit on and I've felt very comfortable with it." He reflected on his club's immediate return to the second tier: "It's a fantastic achievement to bounce straight back to the Championship ... In a challenging economic climate we have tried to provide an entertaining product and we deserve to go up." Millwall's manager Kenny Jackett was gracious in defeat: "It was a 50–50 game ... Scunthorpe put their chances away, so congratulations to them."

Scunthorpe's next season saw them finish in 20th place, two positions above the relegation zone. Millwall ended their following season in third place in the table to qualify for the play-offs where they defeated Swindon Town in the final.
