= 2009 Upton Park riot =

Football riot in London, England

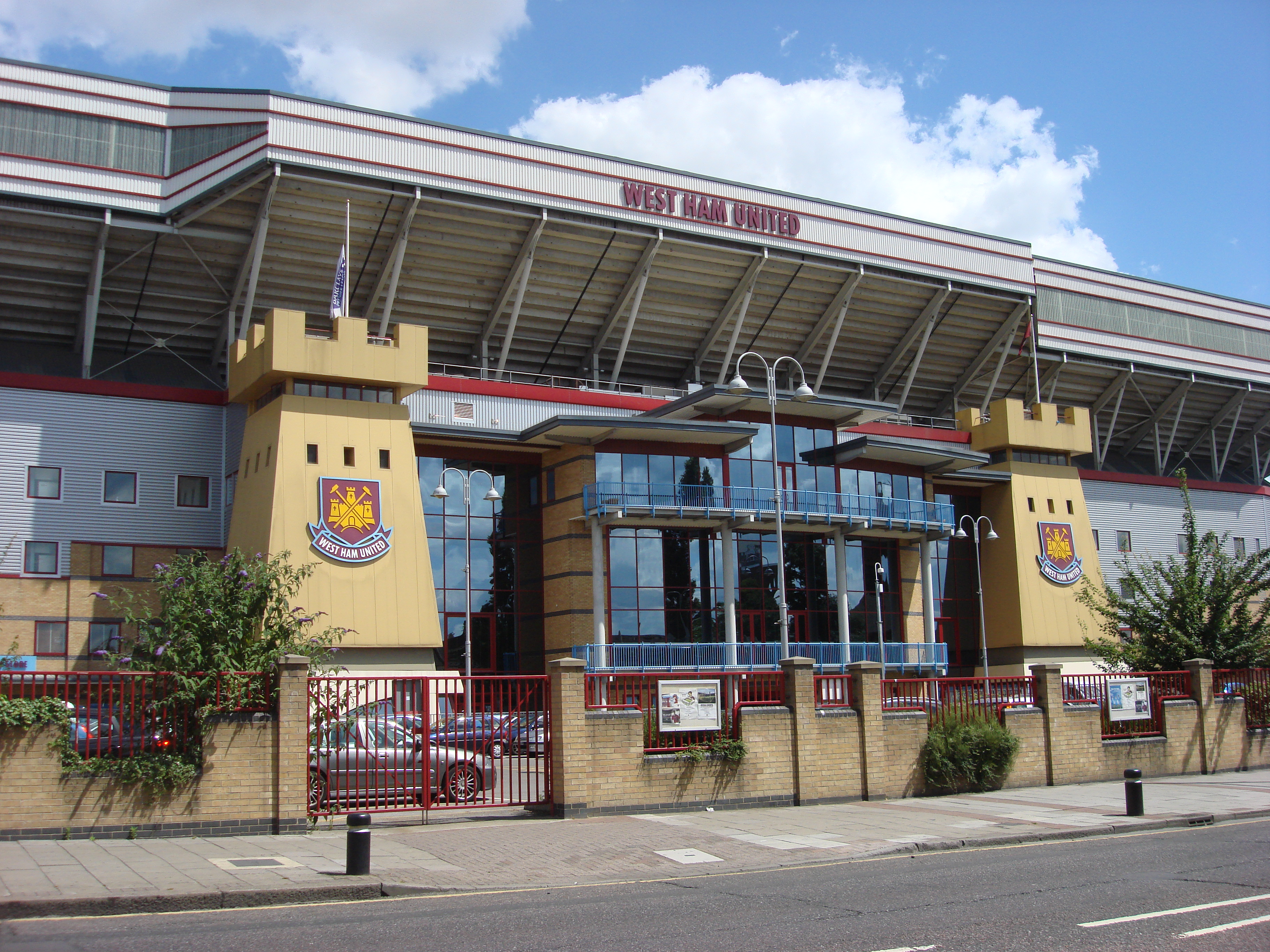
- The Boleyn Ground, where the disturbances took place
- Date: 25 August 2009
- Location: Boleyn Ground, Upton Park, East London
- Methods: Pitch invasions, violent civil disorder

Parties
Inter City Firm; Supporters of West Ham United F.C.	Millwall Bushwackers; Supporters of Millwall F.C.

Casualties and losses
	1 (stabbed)
- 20 others injured

The 2009 Upton Park riot occurred in and around West Ham United's Boleyn Ground, in Upton Park before, during and after a Football League Cup second round match between West Ham and Millwall on 25 August 2009. The match was won by the home side 3–1 after extra time, but the game was marred by pitch invasions and disorder in the streets outside the ground, where a Millwall supporter was stabbed.

The disturbances were met with condemnation by the Football Association, the British government and the two clubs involved. The incident led to fears of a return of the hooliganism that had tarnished the reputation of English football in the 1970s and 80s. There were also concerns that it could have a negative effect on England's bid to host the 2018 World Cup - which was rejected in favour of the bid from Russia more than a year later.

== Background ==
Millwall and West Ham United have a long-standing rivalry that dates back to the clubs' first meeting, a friendly on 23 September 1897. The rivalry stems from the two clubs geographical proximity to one another – their home grounds at the time, The Den and the Boleyn Ground, were 6.8 miles (10.9 km) apart – and over the years, there have been several instances of violence between some fans of the two clubs.

These occurrences had subsided in recent years as the clubs have played in different divisions for most of the time since the 1950s. West Ham, for instance, have been members of the top flight for all but a few seasons since 1958, whereas Millwall only played in the top flight for two seasons between 1988 and 1990 and have at times competed in the third and even fourth tiers of the English league.

Prior to the match, there had been 96 encounters between Millwall and West Ham, of which Millwall had won 38, West Ham 32, and 26 were drawn. The previous tie was a Football League Championship game played on 16 April 2005 at the Boleyn Ground, which ended 1–1.

Hooliganism was rife at most English football grounds in the 1970s and 80s, and many clubs were forced into installing fencing around the perimeter of the pitch. Millwall's hooligan firm, the Millwall Bushwackers, was perceived as one of the most violent, so much so that a common weapon used in such occurrences became known as a Millwall brick. In March 1985, a large section of the club's hooligans were involved in a riot with Luton Town's firm the MIGs; of the 31 men arrested, many were found to be supporters of other London clubs such as West Ham and Chelsea. West Ham United have also been in receipt of bad publicity for their Inter City Firm, which received international notoriety after the release of the 1989 film The Firm and the 2005 film Green Street.

The draw for the second round of the 2009–10 Football League Cup took place on 12 August 2009, and paired West Ham and Millwall together for their first ever League Cup meeting. The police cut the number of tickets given to travelling Millwall fans from 3,000 to 1,500, sparking anger among supporters; Millwall warned police of a higher probability of trouble because of this.

== Match ==
=== Summary ===
Beset by injuries, Millwall could only name four substitutes for the game. They took the lead through long-serving striker Neil Harris in the 26th minute of the match, firing past goalkeeper Robert Green after the West Ham defenders had failed to clear a long throw-in from Scott Barron. The Lions held the lead until three minutes from full-time, when Junior Stanislas equalised for West Ham.

Stanislas' goal sparked a pitch invasion, and although players pleaded with the home fans to return to the stands, the resumption of the match was still delayed by several minutes. With the score at 1–1, the match went into extra time. In the eighth minute of extra time, Millwall defender Andy Frampton was adjudged to have handled the ball in the penalty area and referee Paul Taylor awarded West Ham a penalty kick.

Stanislas converted the penalty, and home fans invaded the pitch again, prompting the Millwall players to retreat to the dressing room. They eventually returned to complete the match, with Zavon Hines adding a third, making the final score 3–1 to West Ham.

=== Details ===
2009–10 Football League Cup
25 August 2009
19:45 BST
Second round

West Ham United	3–1 (a.e.t.)	Millwall
Stanislas 87', 98' (pen.); Hines 100'	Report	Harris 26'

Boleyn Ground, London
Attendance: 24,492
Referee: Paul Taylor (Hertfordshire)

West Ham United	Millwall

GK	1	(England) Robert Green
DF	20	(France) Julien Faubert
DF	4	(Wales) Danny Gabbidon	(yellow card) 16'
DF	30	(England) James Tomkins
DF	18	(United States) Jonathan Spector
MF	8	(England) Scott Parker	(yellow card) 69'
MF	14	(Czech Republic) Radoslav Kováč		(substituted off) 62'
MF	31	(Wales) Jack Collison	(yellow card) 115'
MF	35	(England) Josh Payne		(substituted off) 46'
FW	12	(England) Carlton Cole	(yellow card) 83'	(substituted off) 109'
FW	46	(England) Junior Stanislas
Substitutes:
GK	28	(Hungary) Péter Kurucz
DF	15	(England) Matthew Upson		(substituted on) 109'
DF	19	(Wales) James Collins
DF	33	(Switzerland) Fabio Daprelà
FW	24	(England) Frank Nouble		(substituted on) 62'
MF	34	(England) Olly Lee
FW	41	(England) Zavon Hines		(substituted on) 46'
Manager:
(Italy) Gianfranco Zola

GK	1	(Republic of Ireland) David Forde
DF	2	(Republic of Ireland) Alan Dunne
DF	3	(England) Andy Frampton	(yellow card) 6'
DF	16	(England) Scott Barron	(yellow card) 104'
DF	21	(England) Jack Smith
MF	11	(England) Dave Martin		(substituted off) 91'
MF	12	(England) Chris Hackett
MF	22	(Ghana) Ali Fuseini
MF	24	(Scotland) Marc Laird	(yellow card) 40'
FW	8	(England) Gary Alexander		(substituted off) 99'
FW	9	(England) Neil Harris		(substituted off) 99'
Substitutes:
GK	13	(England) John Sullivan
MF	4	(England) Adam Bolder		(substituted on) 99'
FW	19	(England) Ashley Grimes		(substituted on) 99'
FW	23	(Wales) Jason Price		(substituted on) 91'
Manager:
(Wales) Kenny Jackett

MATCH OFFICIALS

- Assistant referees:
  - Mike George (Norfolk)
  - Gavin Muge (Bedfordshire)
- Fourth official: Neil Hair (Cambridgeshire)

MATCH RULES

- 90 minutes.
- 30 minutes of extra-time if necessary.
- Penalty shoot-out if scores still level.
- Seven named substitutes.
- Maximum of three substitutions.

== Reaction and aftermath ==
The violence was met by surprise and outrage from the footballing authorities and other bodies. The government's sports minister Gerry Sutcliffe commented, "We have made great progress in tackling hooliganism in this country and will not return to the dark days of the 80s." He called the incidents "a disgrace to football" and also said that any culprits should be banned from football for life.

Justice secretary Jack Straw said that "strong measures" needed to be taken to prevent a repeat of the disorder. Home secretary Alan Johnson added, "Anyone who thinks thuggery has a place in modern-day football is living in the dark ages, and will bring only shame upon the teams they support." The shadow culture secretary Jeremy Hunt commented that "Wider questions need to be answered as to how the situation was allowed to get out of hand in the first place."

One West Ham fan was seen carrying a young child on their shoulders as they joined the pitch invasion. A youth worker called this "sickening... The message it is sending is very disturbing" and added that "Running onto the pitch with a young child on your shoulders is not an example to set to young people." The Football Association said that the fan should receive a lifetime ban.

Harry Redknapp, a former West Ham manager, advised the football authorities never to allow West Ham United and Millwall to play each other in a Cup game again. The Metropolitan Police Service said evidence suggested that the violence was planned, but that it was an isolated incident and not a signal that the football violence seen in the 1980s was returning. On 28 September 2009, both West Ham and Millwall were charged by the FA with offences related to the match. Both clubs were charged with failing to ensure that their fans refrained from violent, threatening, obscene and provocative behaviour, racist behaviour and throwing missiles, harmful or dangerous objects onto the pitch. West Ham were also charged with failing to ensure that their supporters did not enter the field of play.

In January 2010 West Ham were fined £115,000 after being found guilty of violent, threatening, obscene and provocative behaviour and of failing to prevent their fans entering the field of play. Millwall were cleared of all charges. In response to the violence and public order offences the Metropolitan Police launched Operation Balconi to investigate the disorder surrounding the game. Eighty people suspected of violence before and after the match were arrested.

As a result, Inner London Crown Court convicted several West Ham fans of violent disorder, passing prison sentences, including one of 20 months, along with many football banning orders — barring individuals from all football grounds — being imposed. West Ham banned at least 54 people for life from Upton Park including 11 season ticket holders. Since the riot, the two teams have played two Football League Championship games against other in the 2011–12 season. The Metropolitan Police implemented London-wide operations to ensure that the games passed by without any incident, and no further trouble was reported.
