= 2007–08 Millwall F.C. season =

Millwall
2007–08 season
- Chairman: John Berylson
- Manager: Willie Donachie; Richard Shaw & Colin West (caretakers); Kenny Jackett
- League One: 17th
- FA Cup: Fourth round
- Carling Cup: First round
- Top goalscorer: League: Gary Alexander (7); All: Gary Alexander and Jay Simpson (8)
- Highest home attendance: 13,395 (vs Leeds United, 19 March)
- Lowest home attendance: 6,617 (vs Northampton Town, 2 October)
- Average home league attendance: 8,669
Home colours	Away colours

The 2007–08 Football League One season saw Millwall finish 17th, narrowly avoiding relegation to the fourth tier of English football. This was Millwall's 82nd season in the Football League and 39th in the third tier and Kenny Jackett's first season in charge of the club.

== Results ==
=== Final table ===
Pos	Team	Pld	W	D	L	GF	GA	GD	Pts
15	Hartlepool United	46	15	9	22	62	65	−3	54
16	Bristol Rovers	46	12	17	17	45	53	−8	53
17	Millwall	46	14	10	22	45	61	−16	52
18	Yeovil Town	46	14	10	22	38	59	−21	52
19	Cheltenham Town	46	13	12	21	42	64	−22	51

Updated to match(es) played on 3 May 2008. Source: The Football League
Rules for classification: 1) points; 2) goal difference; 3) number of goals scored.

== Players ==
=== First-team squad ===
Squad at end of season

Note: Flags indicate national team as defined under FIFA eligibility rules; some limited exceptions apply. Players may hold more than one non-FIFA nationality.

No.	Pos.	Nation	Player
1	GK	(England) ENG	Lenny Pidgeley
2	DF	(England) ENG	Danny Senda
3	DF	(England) ENG	Andy Frampton
4	MF	(England) ENG	Danny Spiller
5	DF	(England) ENG	Paul Robinson
6	DF	(United States) USA	Zak Whitbread
7	DF	(Republic of Ireland) IRL	Alan Dunne
8	FW	(England) ENG	Gary Alexander
9	FW	(England) ENG	Neil Harris
10	FW	(England) ENG	Lewis Grabban (Note: Grabban was born in England, but also qualified to represent Jamaica internationally.)
11	MF	(England) ENG	Ryan Smith
12	MF	(England) ENG	Chris Hackett
13	GK	(England) ENG	Chris Day
14	MF	(England) ENG	Dave Brammer
15	FW	(Scotland) SCO	Tom Brighton
16	DF	(England) ENG	Scott Barron
17	FW	(England) ENG	Bas Savage
18	MF	(England) ENG	Dave Martin
19	FW	(England) ENG	Jay Simpson (on loan from Arsenal)
20	MF	(England) ENG	Adrian Forbes

No.	Pos.	Nation	Player
21	DF	(Ivory Coast) CIV	Zoumana Bakayoko
22	MF	(Ghana) GHA	Ali Fuseini
23	GK	(England) ENG	Preston Edwards
24	GK	(England) ENG	Rhys Evans
25	MF	(Croatia) CRO	Ahmet Brković
26	MF	(Scotland) SCO	Marc Laird
27	DF	(England) ENG	Richard Shaw
28	DF	(England) ENG	Mark Phillips
29	FW	(England) ENG	Andrew Callaghan
30	DF	(England) ENG	Marcus Bignot
31	DF	(Republic of Ireland) IRL	Ross Gaynor
32	DF	(Antigua and Barbuda) ATG	Justin Cochrane (Note: Cochrane was born in England.)
33	DF	(England) ENG	Jack Sim
34	FW	(England) ENG	Gary Noël (Note: Noël was born in London, England, but also qualified to represent Mauritius internationally and made his international debut for Mauritius in March 2016.)
35	DF	(England) ENG	Michael Noone
36	DF	(England) ENG	Pat O'Connor
37	MF	(England) ENG	Gary Bowers
40	DF	(England) ENG	Darren Ebsworth
41	MF	(Turkey) TUR	Jem Karacan
42	DF	(England) ENG	Tony Craig (on loan from Crystal Palace)

=== Left club during season ===
Note: Flags indicate national team as defined under FIFA eligibility rules; some limited exceptions apply. Players may hold more than one non-FIFA nationality.

No.	Pos.	Nation	Player
10	FW	(Jamaica) JAM	Darren Byfield (Note: Byfield was born in Sutton Coldfield, England, but also qualified to represent Jamaica internationally and made his international debut for Jamaica in 2003.) (to Bristol City)
10	FW	(England) ENG	Will Hoskins (on loan from Watford)
17	FW	(England) ENG	Ben May (to Scunthorpe United)
18	MF	(England) ENG	Jamie O'Hara (on loan from Tottenham Hotspur)
20	MF	Jersey	Peter Vincenti (to Stevenage Borough)
24	MF	(England) ENG	Neal Ardley (retired)

No.	Pos.	Nation	Player
24	GK	(Scotland) SCO	Rab Douglas (on loan from Leicester City)
24	FW	(England) ENG	Adebayo Akinfenwa (to Northampton Town)
26	DF	(Trinidad and Tobago) TRI	Brent Sancho (to Ross County)
30	MF	(England) ENG	Tom Kilbey (to Portsmouth)
32	MF	(Scotland) SCO	Bryan Hodge (on loan from Blackburn Rovers)

=== Reserve squad ===
Note: Flags indicate national team as defined under FIFA eligibility rules; some limited exceptions apply. Players may hold more than one non-FIFA nationality.

No.	Pos.	Nation	Player
—	FW	(England) ENG	Kiernan Hughes-Mason
