= 2008–09 Millwall F.C. season =

Millwall
2008–09 season
- Chairman: John Berylson
- Manager: Kenny Jackett
- League One: 5th
- FA Cup: Fourth round
- League Cup: First round
- EFL Trophy: First round
- Top goalscorer: League: Gary Alexander (9); All: Gary Alexander (11)
- Highest home attendance: 13,261 (vs Leicester, 14 March 2009)
- Lowest home attendance: 6,685 (vs Northampton, 10 March 2009)

This article details Millwall's 2008–09 season in League One, Millwall's 83rd season in the Football League and 40th in the third tier.

== Events ==
This will be a list of the significant events to occur at the club during the 2008–09 season, presented in chronological order.

9 August 2008 - The season begins with a 4–3 loss away to Oldham Athletic.

12 August 2008 - Got knocked out in the first round of the League Cup at home to Northampton Town.

== Players ==
=== Squad information ===
N	Pos.	Nat.	Name	Age	EU	Since	App	Goals	Ends	Transfer fee	Notes
1	GK	(Republic of Ireland)	Forde	46	EU	2008	51	0	30 Jun 2010	Free	
2	DF	(England)	Senda	45	EU	2006	87	1	Undisclosed	Undisclosed	
3	DF	(England)	Frampton	47	EU	2007	77	3	Undisclosed	Undisclosed	
4	MF	(England)	Spiller	45	EU	2007	10	1	30 Jun 2009	Free	
5	DF	(England)	Robinson	44	EU	2001	201	11	Undisclosed	Youth system	
6	DF	(United States)	Whitbread	42	Non-EU	2006	115	4	Undisclosed	Free	
7	MF	(Republic of Ireland)	Dunne	44	EU	2000	166	16	Undisclosed	Youth system	
8	FW	(England)	Alexander	47	EU	2007	79	19	30 Jun 2010	Free	
9	FW	(England)	Harris	49	EU	2007	357	116	30 Jun 2010	Free	Club's all time record goalscorer
10	FW	(England)	Grabban	38	EU	2008	49	10	30 Jun 2011	£150,000	
11	MF	(England)	Henry	37	EU	2009	14	3	30 Jun 2009	Loan	On loan from Reading
12	MF	(England)	Hackett	43	EU	2006	72	4	30 Jun 2010	Undisclosed	
13	FW	(England)	McLeod	42	EU	2009	8	2	30 Jun 2009	Loan	On loan from Charlton Athletic
14	DF	(Wales)	Duffy	41	EU	2009	12	0	30 Jun 2009	Undisclosed	
15	DF	(England)	Craig	41	EU	2008	139	5	30 Jun 2010	Undisclosed	
16	MF	(England)	Barron	41	EU	2008	32	1	Undisclosed	Undisclosed	
18	MF	(Croatia)	Brković	52	EU	2007	35	4	30 Jun 2009	Free	
19	FW	(England)	Grimes	39	EU	2008	21	4	Undisclosed	Free	
21	MF	(England)	Martin	41	EU	2008	59	6	Undisclosed	£50,000	
22	MF	(Ghana)	Fuseini	37	EU	2006	72	2	Undisclosed	Youth system	
23	GK	(England)	Edwards	37	EU	2006	2	0	Undisclosed	Youth system	On loan at Dover Athletic
24	MF	(Scotland)	Laird	40	EU	2008	58	7	Undisclosed	Free	
26	MF	(France)	Abdou	37	EU	2008	38	3	Undisclosed	Free	
28	FW	(Wales)	Price	49	EU	2009	6	3	30 Jun 2009	Loan	On loan from Doncaster Rovers
30	DF	(England)	Bignot	52	EU	2008	26	0	30 Jun 2009	Free	
32	MF	(England)	Bolder	46	EU	2008	29	0	30 Jun 2011	Free	
40	GK	(England)	Pidgeley	42	EU	2005	66	0	Undisclosed	Free	

- Source: Wikipedia players' articles, Millwall, millwall-mad
- Ordered by Squad Number.

Appearances (starts and substitute appearances) and goals include those in the League One (and playoffs), FA Cup, League Cup and EFL Trophy.

=== Squad stats ===
				Total			League One		FA Cup		Football League Cup		Football League Trophy	
No.	Pos.	Nat.	Name	Sts	App	Gls	App	Gls	App	Gls	App	Gls	App	Gls
1	GK	(Republic of Ireland)	Forde	51	51		44		5		1		1	
2	DF	(England)	Senda											
3	DF	(England)	Frampton	37	42	2	35	1	5	1	1		1	
4	MF	(England)	Spiller		3		2		1					
5	DF	(England)	Robinson	31	31	2	26	2	4				1	
6	DF	(United States)	Whitbread	36	40	1	37		1	1	1		1	
7	MF	(Republic of Ireland)	Dunne	22	27		22		5					
8	FW	(England)	Alexander	30	38	11	33	9	4	2	1			
9	FW	(England)	Harris	23	38	10	33	8	5	2				
10	FW	(England)	Grabban	34	35	7	29	6	5	1	1			
11	MF	(England)	Henry	13	14	3	14	3						
12	MF	(England)	Hackett	18	27		22		3		1		1	
13	FW	(England)	McLeod	6	8	2	7	2	1					
14	DF	(Wales)	Duffy	11	12		12							
15	DF	(England)	Craig	46	47	2	42	2	3		1		1	
16	MF	(England)	Barron	8	15	1	13		2	1				
17	FW	(England)	Kandol	19	22	8	18	8	2		1		1	
18	MF	(Croatia)	Brković	4	8	1	6	1			1		1	
19	FW	(England)	Grimes	5	21	4	17	2	4	2				
21	MF	(England)	Martin	41	48	4	42	4	4		1		1	
22	MF	(Ghana)	Fuseini	15	22		17		3		1		1	
23	GK	(England)	Edwards											
24	MF	(Scotland)	Laird	35	40	6	35	5	4	1	1			
26	MF	(France)	Abdou	38	37	3	32	3	3		1		1	
28	FW	(Wales)	Price	5	6	3	6	3						
28	FW	(Wales)	Easter	3	6	1	5	1	1					
30	DF	(England)	Bignot	1	1		1							
32	MF	(England)	Bolder	29	29		26		3					
40	GK	(England)	Pidgeley											

Ordered by Squad Numbers
0 shown as blank

==== Disciplinary record ====
N	Pos.	Nat.	Name	Yellow card	Second yellow card	Red card	Notes
1	GK	(Republic of Ireland)	Forde	0	0	0	
2	DF	(England)	Senda	0	0	0	
3	DF	(England)	Frampton	8	0	0	
4	MF	(England)	Spiller	0	0	0	
5	DF	(England)	Robinson	5	0	1	
6	DF	(United States)	Whitbread	9	0	0	
7	MF	(Republic of Ireland)	Dunne	6	1	0	
8	FW	(England)	Alexander	9	0	1	
9	FW	(England)	Harris	5	0	0	
10	FW	(England)	Grabban	5	0	0	
11	MF	(England)	Henry	3	0	0	
12	MF	(England)	Hackett	8	0	0	
13	FW	(England)	McLeod	1	0	0	
14	DF	(Wales)	Duffy	2	0	0	
15	DF	(England)	Craig	8	0	1	
16	MF	(England)	Barron	3	0	0	
17	FW	(England)	Kandol	3	0	1	
18	MF	(Croatia)	Brković	0	0	0	
19	FW	(England)	Grimes	4	0	0	
21	MF	(England)	Martin	9	1	0	
22	MF	(Ghana)	Fuseini	4	0	0	
23	GK	(England)	Edwards	0	0	0	
24	MF	(Scotland)	Laird	7	0	0	
26	MF	(France)	Abdou	6	0	1	
28	FW	(Wales)	Price	0	0	0	
28	FW	(Wales)	Easter	1	1	0	
30	DF	(England)	Bignot	0		0	
32	MF	(England)	Bolder	4	0	0	
40	GK	(England)	Pidgeley	0	0	0	

Only competitive matches
(yellow card) = Number of bookings; (second yellow card) = Number of sending offs after a second yellow card; (red card) = Number of sending offs by a direct red card.

=== Players in and out ===
==== In ====
No.	Pos.	Nat.	Name	Age	EU	Moving from	Type	Transfer window	Ends	Transfer fee	Source
26	MF	(France)	Abdou	24	EU	Plymouth Argyle	Transfer ✓	Summer	Undisclosed	Free	
15	DF	(England)	Craig	23	EU	Crystal Palace	Transfer ✓	Summer	Undisclosed	Free	
10	FW	(England)	Grimes	21	EU	Manchester City	Transfer ✓	Summer	Undisclosed	Free	
14	DF	(Wales)	Duffy	23	EU	Portsmouth	Transfer ✓	Winter	Undisclosed	Free	
42	MF	(Republic of Ireland)	Moore	19	EU	Manchester City	Loan ✓	Summer	Undisclosed	Loan	
17	FW	(England)	Kandol	27	EU	Leeds United	Loan ✓	Summer	Undisclosed	Loan	
28	FW	(Wales)	Easter	26	EU	Plymouth Argyle	Loan ✓	Summer	Undisclosed	Loan	
32	MF	(England)	Bolder	28	EU	Queens Park Rangers	Transfer ✓	Winter	Undisclosed	Free	
13	FW	(England)	McLeod	24	EU	Charlton Athletic	Loan ✓	Winter	Undisclosed	Loan	
11	MF	(England)	Henry	19	EU	Reading	Loan ✓	Winter	Undisclosed	Loan	
28	FW	(Wales)	Price	32	EU	Doncaster Rovers	Loan ✓	Winter	Undisclosed	Loan	

==== Out ====
No.	Pos.	Nat.	Name	Age	EU	Moving to	Type	Transfer window	Transfer fee	Source
40	GK	(England)	Pidgeley	25	EU	Woking	Loan ✓	Summer	Loan	
	MF	(England)	Brammer	33	EU	Port Vale	Transfer ✓	Summer	Free	
19	MF	(England)	Smith	22	EU	Southampton	Transfer ✓	Winter	Free	
	FW	(England)	Forbes	29	EU	Grimsby Town	Loan ✓	Winter	Free	
	MF	(France)	Bakayogo	22	EU		Released	Winter	Free	

EU = if holds or not a European Union passport; Country: when 2 flags, 1st flag = country that plays for internationally, 2nd flag = country of birth; N = number on jersey; P = Position (for position name, pause mouse pointer on abbreviation); Name = Name on jersey (for more extensive name, pause mouse pointer on name); Age = age on the day of the signing; Moving from = only indicate the club the player was playing before start playing for this club in this season, for the type of the moving see Status column; Moving to = only indicates the club the player is going to play next, for the type of the moving see Status column; Ends = when the player's current contract ends; n/a = Not applicable.

== Club ==
=== Kits ===
Home; Supplier: Bukta; Sponsors: CYC	Away; Supplier: Bukta; Sponsors: CYC	Third kit Supplier: Bukta; Sponsors: CYC	Goalkeepers; Supplier: Bukta; Sponsors: CYC

== Competitions ==
=== Overall ===
Competition	Started round	Current position / round	Final position / round	First match	Last match
League One	—	5th		9 August 2008	2 May 2009
Football League Cup	First round	First round	First round	12 August 2008	12 August 2008
Football League Trophy	First round	First round	First round	2 September 2008	2 September 2008
FA Cup	First round	Fourth round	Fourth round	8 November 2008	24 January 2009

Source: Competitions

=== League ===
==== Table ====
Pos	Team	Pld	W	D	L	GF	GA	GD	Pts	Promotion or relegation
3	Milton Keynes Dons	46	26	9	11	83	47	+36	87	Qualification for League One play-offs
4	Leeds United	46	26	6	14	77	49	+28	84	Qualification for League One play-offs
5	Millwall	46	25	7	14	63	53	+10	82	Qualification for League One play-offs
6	Scunthorpe United (O, P)	46	22	10	14	82	63	+19	76	Qualification for League One play-offs
7	Tranmere Rovers	46	21	11	14	62	49	+13	74	

Updated to match(es) played on 2 May 2009. Source: The Football League
Rules for classification: 1) points; 2) goal difference; 3) number of goals scored.
(O) Play-off winners; (P) Promoted

=== Play-offs ===
Semi-finals
6	Scunthorpe United	1	0 (7)	1
3	Milton Keynes Dons	1	0 (6)	1
5	Millwall	1	1	2
4	Leeds United	0	1	1

Final
6	Scunthorpe United	3
5	Millwall	2

==== Results summary ====
Overall								Home						Away					
Pld	W	D	L	GF	GA	GD	Pts	W	D	L	GF	GA	GD	W	D	L	GF	GA	GD
44	24	7	13	61	50	+11	79	12	4	6	28	20	+8	12	3	7	33	30	+3

==== Results by round ====
Round	1	2	3	4	5	6	7	8	9	10	11	12	13	14	15	16	17	18	19	20	21	22	23	24	25	26	27	28	29	30	31	32	33	34	35	36	37	38	39	40	41	42	43	44	45	46
Ground	A	H	A	H	H	A	H	A	H	A	H	A	A	H	A	H	A	H	H	A	H	A	H	H	A	H	A	A	H	H	A	H	A	A	H	H	A	A	A	H	H	A	H	A	H	A
Result	L	D	D	W	W	W	W	W	L	W	W	W	L	W	L	W	D	W	W	W	D	L	D	W	W	L	L	D	D	L	W	L	W	W	W	L	W	W	W	L	W	L	W	L		

A = Away; H = Home; W = Win; D = Draw; L = Loss

==== Results ====
9 August 2008	Oldham Athletic	4–3	Millwall	Oldham
	Liddell 3'; O'Grady (yellow card) 39' (Unsporting behaviour); Liddell (yellow card) 43' (Unsporting behaviour); Liddell 74'; Alessandra 84'; Taylor 85'; Taylor (yellow card) 86' (Unsporting behaviour)	Report	Kandol 1'; Abdou (yellow card) 8' (Unsporting behaviour); Hazell 21' (o.g.); Dunne (yellow card) 44' (Unsporting behaviour); Grabban 56'; Robinson (red card) 73' (Serious foul play); Whitbread (yellow card) 84' (Unsporting behaviour)	Stadium: Boundary Park; Attendance: 5,367; Referee: N Miller

16 August 2008	Millwall	1–1	Southend United	Bermondsey, London
	Abdou (yellow card) 63' (Unsporting behaviour); Hackett (yellow card) 81' (Unsporting behaviour); Robinson (yellow card) 88' (Unsporting behaviour); Harris (yellow card) 90' (Dissent); Brkovic 90+2'	Report	Revell 7'; Harding (yellow card) 10' (Unsporting behaviour); Moussa (yellow card) 34' (Unsporting behaviour); Clarke (yellow card) 39' (Dissent); Ademeno (yellow card) 48' (Unsporting behaviour)	Stadium: The Den; Attendance: 8,114; Referee: K Stroud

23 August 2008	Northampton Town	0–0	Millwall	Northampton
	Osman (yellow card) 55' (Dissent); Little (yellow card) 85' (Dissent)	Report	Brkovic (yellow card) 18' (Dissent); Craig (yellow card) 67' (Dissent); Hackett (yellow card) 84' (Dissent)	Stadium: Sixfields Stadium; Attendance: 4,402; Referee: Darren Deadman

30 August 2008	Millwall	2–1	Huddersfield Town	Bermondsey, London
	Kandol 37'; Grabban 62'; Frampton (yellow card) 71' (Unsporting behaviour); Craig (yellow card) 90' (Unsporting behaviour); Martin (yellow card) 90' (Unsporting behaviour)	Report	Dickinson 18'; Dickinson (yellow card) 27' (Unsporting behaviour); Worthington (yellow card) 60' (Unsporting behaviour); Lucketti (yellow card) 73' (Unsporting behaviour); Flynn (yellow card) 73' (Persistent foul play); Roberts (yellow card) 82' (Persistent foul play)	Stadium: The Den; Attendance: 7,513; Referee: K Hill

6 September 2008	Millwall	2–0	Hartlepool United	Bermondsey, London
	Grabban 3'; Alexander 41'	Report	Liddle (yellow card) 51' (Unsporting behaviour); Porter (yellow card) 70' (Dissent)	Stadium: The Den; Attendance: 7,207; Referee: S Bratt

13 September 2008	Leicester City	0–1	Millwall	Leicester
	Gradel (yellow card) 41' (Unsporting behaviour); Tunchev (yellow card) 64' (Unsporting behaviour)	Report	Alexander (yellow card) 6' (Unsporting behaviour); Alexander 20'; Abdou (yellow card) 32' (Unsporting behaviour); Craig (yellow card) 40' (Unsporting behaviour); Whitbread (yellow card) 73' (Unsporting behaviour); Kandol (red card) 90' (Violent conduct)	Stadium: Walkers Stadium; Attendance: 19,591; Referee: P Miller

20 September 2008	Millwall	2–0	Cheltenham Town	Bermondsey, London
	Alexander 70' (pen.); Martin 81'	Report	Hayles (red card) 28' (Serious foul play); Owusu (yellow card) 61' (Unsporting behaviour)	Stadium: The Den; Attendance: 8,009; Referee: J Moss

28 September 2008	Swindon Town	1–2	Millwall	Swindon
	J. Smith 47'; Nalis (yellow card) 73' (Dissent); Cox (yellow card) 88' (Unsporting behaviour)	Report	Easter 24'; Grabban 75'; Easter (yellow card) 87' (Unsporting behaviour); Easter (yellow card) 90' (red card) (Second yellow card)	Stadium: County Ground; Attendance: 7,589; Referee: A Penn

4 October 2008	Millwall	0–4	Milton Keynes Dons	Bermondsey, London
	Martin (yellow card) 28' (Unsporting behaviour); Abdou (yellow card) 44' (Unsporting behaviour)	Report	O'Hanlon 9'; Chadwick (yellow card) 19' (Unsporting behaviour); Leven (yellow card) 37' (Dissent); Wright (yellow card) 39' (Dissent); Baldock 45'; Baldock (yellow card) 54' (Unsporting behaviour); Robinson 62' (o.g.); Baldock 90'	Stadium: The Den; Attendance: 9,871; Referee: M Russell

11 October 2008	Tranmere Rovers	1–3	Millwall	Prenton Park
	Savage 90'	Report	Kandol 8'; Kandol 13'; Abdou 60'; Craig (yellow card) 68' (Unsporting behaviour); Hackett (yellow card) 73' (Unsporting behaviour> Whitbread (yellow card) 90' (Unsporting behaviour)	Attendance: 5,863; Referee: A Haines

18 October 2008	Millwall	3–1	Leeds United	Bermondsey, London
	Alexander (yellow card) 30' (Dissent); Martin 38'; Harris (yellow card) 54' (Unsporting behaviour); Harris 59'; Harris 88'	Report	Kilkenny (yellow card) 9' (Unsporting behaviour); Becchio 31'; Becchio (yellow card) 53' (Unsporting behaviour)	Stadium: The Den; Attendance: 13,041; Referee: A Marriner

21 October 2008	Colchester United	1–2	Millwall	Colchester
	Hammond (yellow card) 20' (Unsporting behaviour); Izzet 35'; White (yellow card) 53' (Unsporting behaviour)	Report	Grabban 9'; Laird (yellow card) 22' (Unsporting behaviour); Robinson 23'; Hackett (yellow card) 45' (Unsporting behaviour); Martin (yellow card) 60' (Usnporting behaviour); Grabban (yellow card) 74' (Unsporting behaviour)	Stadium: Colchester Community Stadium; Attendance: 5,506; Referee: G Hegley

25 October 2008	Scunthorpe United	3–2	Millwall	Glanford Park
	Hooper 5'; Hayes 16' (pen.); Sparrow 51'; Hooper (yellow card) 64' (Dissent); May (yellow card) 90' (Unsporting behaviour)	Report	Whitbread (yellow card) 16' (Persistent foul play); Harris 62'; Craig 69'	Attendance: 5,670; Referee: Neil Swarbrick

28 October 2008	Millwall	1–0	Hereford United	Bermondsey, London
	Abdou (red card) 49' (Professional foul); Grabban 86'	Report	Rose (yellow card) 7' (Unsporting behaviour); Chadwick (yellow card) 55' (Unsporting behaviour); Chadwick (yellow card) 62' (red card) (Second bookable offence); Taylor (yellow card) 71' (Unsporting behaviour)	Stadium: The Den; Attendance: 9,071; Referee: A Woolmer

1 November 2008	Brighton & Hove Albion	4–1	Millwall	Withdean Stadium
	Virgo (yellow card) 20' (Unsporting behaviour); Murray 45'; Murray 57'; Johnson 65'; Cox 81'; Johnson (yellow card) 86' (Unsporting behaviour)	Report	Hackett (yellow card) 18' (Unsporting behaviour); Kandol 49'; Kandol (yellow card) 72' (Unsporting behaviour); Fuseini (yellow card) 86' (Unsporting behaviour)	Attendance: 5,973; Referee: A Wiley

15 November 2008	Millwall	1–0	Stockport County	Bermondsey, London
	Grabban (yellow card) 29' (Dissent); Frampton (yellow card) 42' (Unsporting behaviour); Martin 76'; Craig (yellow card) 83' (Unsporting behaviour); Martin (yellow card) 90' (Unsporting behaviour)	Report	Blizzard (yellow card) 35' (Unsporting behaviour); Davies (yellow card) 39' (Unsporting behaviour); Williams (yellow card) 53' (Timewasting); McSweeney (yellow card) 70' (Unsporting behaviour); Tunnicliffe (yellow card) 90' (Unsporting behaviour)	Stadium: The Den; Attendance: 9,030; Referee: I Williamson

22 November 2008	Leyton Orient	0–0	Millwall	Leyton, London
	Melligan (yellow card) 33' (Unsporting behaviour); Parkin (yellow card) 44' (Unsporting behaviour)	Report		Stadium: Brisbane Road; Attendance: 6,951; Referee: D Whitestone

25 November 2008	Millwall	1–0	Carlisle United	Bermondsey, London
	Alexander (yellow card) 48' (Unsporting behaviour); Robinson (yellow card) 62' (Unsporting behaviour); Kandol 90'	Report	Keogh (yellow card) 33' (Deliberate handball)	Stadium: The Den; Attendance: 6,828; Referee: F Graham

6 December 2008	Millwall	3–2	Bristol Rovers	Bermondsey, London
	Kandol 5'; Kandol 18'; Dunne (yellow card) 36' (Unsporting behaviour); Kandol (yellow card) 43' (Unsporting behaviour); Abdou (yellow card) 45' (Unsporting behaviour); Alexander 72'; Bolder (yellow card) 88' (Unsporting behaviour)	Report	Anthony (yellow card) 13' (Unsporting behaviour); Lambert 19'; Kuffour 79'	Stadium: The Den; Attendance: 8,123; Referee: G Scott

13 December 2008	Walsall	1–2	Millwall	Bescot, Walsall
	Nicholls 28'; Sansara (yellow card) 72' (Unsporting behaviour)	Report	Harris 16'; Robinson (yellow card) 77' (Unsporting behaviour); Frampton 89'	Stadium: Bescot Stadium; Attendance: 3,790; Referee: D Foster

20 December 2008	Millwall	0–0	Crewe Alexandra	Bermondsey, London
	Robinson (yellow card) 13' (Unsporting behaviour); Grabban (yellow card) 54' (Unsporting behaviour)	Report		Stadium: The Den; Attendance: 9,018; Referee: S Hooper

26 December 2008	Peterborough United	1–0	Millwall	Peterborough
	McLean 23'; Lewis (yellow card) 87' (Timewasting)	Report	Craig (red card) 31' (Violent conduct); Martin (yellow card) 84' (Unsporting behaviour)	Stadium: London Road; Attendance: 9,351; Referee: K Evans

28 December 2008	Millwall	1–1	Yeovil Town	Bermondsey, London
	Robinson 4'; Bolder (yellow card) 57' (Unsporting behaviour); Barron (yellow card) 66' (Dissent); Robinson (yellow card) 74' (Unsporting behaviour); Forde (yellow card) 74' (Dissent)	Report	Peltier (yellow card) 34' (Unsporting behaviour); Rodgers 37'	Stadium: The Den; Attendance: 9,042; Referee: J Linington

17 January 2009	Millwall	1–0	Tranmere Rovers	Bermondsey, London
	Laird (yellow card) 34' (Unsporting behaviour); Whitbread (yellow card) 37' (Unsporting behaviour); Harris (yellow card) 41' (Unsporting behaviour); Laird 73'	Report	Kay (yellow card) 39' (Unsporting behaviour); Goodison (yellow card) 42' (Unsporting behaviour); Savage (yellow card) 90' (Unsporting behaviour)	Stadium: The Den; Attendance: 8,257; Referee: R East

27 January 2009	Hereford United	0–2	Millwall	Hereford
	Guinan (yellow card) 90' (Unsporting behaviour)	Report	Robinson (yellow card) 40' (Unsporting behaviour); Craig 65'; Laird 90'	Stadium: Edgar Street; Attendance: 3,001; Referee: K Wright

31 January 2009	Millwall	1–2	Scunthorpe United	Bermondsey, London
	Alexander 64'; Laird (yellow card) 82' (Unsporting behaviour)	Report	Hooper 73'; Hooper 88'	Stadium: The Den; Attendance: 8,868; Referee: Andy D'Urso

9 February 2009	Leeds United	2–0	Millwall	Beeston, Leeds
	Rui Marques (yellow card) 13' (Unsporting behaviour); Beckford 32'; Douglas (yellow card) 54' (Unsporting behaviour); Beckford (yellow card) 64' (Unsporting behaviour); Beckford 90'	Report	Bolder (yellow card) 37' (Unsporting behaviour); Fuseini (yellow card) 45' (Unsporting behaviour); Grimes (yellow card) 90' (Unsporting behaviour)	Stadium: Elland Road; Attendance: 19,314; Referee: A Wiley

14 February 2009	Stockport County	2–2	Millwall	Stockport
	Williams (yellow card) 52' (Unsporting behaviour); Mullins (yellow card) 57' (Unsporting behaviour); McNeil 79'; Johnson 83'	Report	McLeod 17'; Frampton (yellow card) 48' (Unsporting behaviour); McLeod 53' (pen.); McLeod (yellow card) 57' (Unsporting behaviour); Martin (yellow card) 59' (Unsporting behaviour); Martin (yellow card) 65' (red card) (Second yellow card); Forde (yellow card) 90' (Timewasting)	Stadium: Edgeley Park; Attendance: 5,461; Referee: R Booth

17 February 2009	Millwall	1–1	Swindon Town	Bermondsey, London
	Grimes (yellow card) 88' (Unsporting behaviour); Henry 90'	Report	Paynter 43'; Greer (yellow card) 49' (Unsporting behaviour); J. Smith (yellow card) 61' (Unsporting behaviour); Cox (yellow card) 85' (Dissent)	Stadium: The Den; Attendance: 7,104; Referee: P Miller

21 February 2009	Millwall	0–1	Brighton & Hove Albion	Bermondsey, London
	Abdou (yellow card) 61' (Unsporting behaviour); Whitbread (yellow card) 75' (Unsporting behaviour); Craig (yellow card) 89' (Dissent)	Report	Jarrett (yellow card) 33' (Unsporting behaviour); Virgo 73'	Stadium: The Den; Attendance: 9,226; Referee: R Styles

24 February 2009	Cheltenham Town	1–3	Millwall	Cheltenham
	Duffy 30' (o.g.); Finnigan (yellow card) 64' (Unsporting behaviour)	Report	Péricard (yellow card) 45' (Unsporting behaviour); Henry 50' (pen.); Grimes 60'; Laird 89'	Stadium: Whaddon Road; Attendance: 2,942; Referee: S Mathieson

28 February 2009	Millwall	2–3	Oldham Athletic	Bermondsey, London
	Harris 56' (pen.); Grimes 68'	Report	Smalley 5'; Hughes 10'; Smalley (yellow card) 37' (Unsporting behaviour); Eardley (yellow card) 56' (Unsporting behaviour); Taylor 90'	Stadium: The Den; Attendance: 8,551; Referee: A Bates

3 March 2009	Southend United	0–1	Millwall	Southend-on-Sea
		Report	Frampton (yellow card) 20' (Unsporting behaviour); Whitbread (yellow card) 31' (Unsporting behaviour); Alexander 39'; Alexander (yellow card) 90' (Unsporting behaviour)	Stadium: Roots Hall; Attendance: 7,620; Referee: R East

7 March 2009	Huddersfield Town	1–2	Millwall	Huddersfield
	Lucketti (yellow card) 22' (Unsporting behaviour); Roberts 74'	Report	Duffy (yellow card) 44' (Unsporting behaviour); Laird 69'; Alexander (yellow card) 81' (Timewasting); Henry 90'	Stadium: Galpharm Stadium; Attendance: 13,196; Referee: O Langford

10 March 2009	Millwall	1–0	Northampton Town	Bermondsey, London
	Alexander 35'	Report		Stadium: The Den; Attendance: 6,685; Referee: G Hegley

14 March 2009	Millwall	0–1	Leicester City	Bermondsey, London
	Frampton (yellow card) 38' (Dissent)	Report	Howard 22'; Howard (yellow card) 37' (Unsporting behaviour); Warner (yellow card) 90' (Timewasting)	Stadium: The Den; Attendance: 13,261; Referee: A Taylor

17 March 2009	Milton Keynes Dons	0–1	Millwall	Milton Keynes
	Wilbraham (yellow card) 82' (Unsporting behaviour)	Report	Laird (yellow card) 14' (Unsporting behaviour); Laird 20'; Alexander (yellow card) 24' (Unsporting behaviour); Duffy (yellow card) 55' (Unsporting behaviour); Henry (yellow card) 67' (Dissent)	Stadium: Stadium:MK; Attendance: 12,238; Referee: M Haywood

21 March 2009	Hartlepool United	2–3	Millwall	Hartlepool
	Sweeney 23'; Sweeney 25'; Sweeney (yellow card) 59' (Dissent); Collins (yellow card) 61' (Unsporting behaviour)	Report	Frampton (yellow card) 14' (Unsporting behaviour); Henry (yellow card) 26' (Unsporting behaviour); Harris 62'; Harris 67'; Harris 72'; Harris (yellow card) 90' (Unsporting behaviour)	Stadium: Victoria Park; Attendance: 3,601; Referee: T Kettle

28 March 2009	Crewe Alexandra	0–1	Millwall	Crewe
	Baudet (yellow card) 76' (Dissent); Donaldson (yellow card) 84' (Unsporting behaviour)	Report	Whitbread (yellow card) 45' (Unsporting behaviour); Alexander (yellow card) 70' (Unsporting behaviour); Bolder (yellow card) 73' (Unsporting behaviour); Price (yellow card) 90' (Unsporting behaviour); Henry (yellow card) 90' (Dissent); Price 90'	Stadium: Alexandra Stadium; Attendance: 4,680; Referee: J Moss

31 March 2009	Millwall	0–1	Colchester United	Bermondsey, London
	Whitbread (yellow card) 47' (Unsporting behaviour); Grimes (yellow card) 77' (Unsporting behaviour)	Report	Baldwin (yellow card) 30' (Unsporting behaviour); Trotman (yellow card) 48' (Unsporting behaviour); Maybury (yellow card) 77' (Unsporting behaviour); Tierney (yellow card) 81' (Dissent); Platt 84'	Stadium: The Den; Attendance: 8,071; Referee: P Taylor

4 April 2009	Millwall	3–1	Walsall	Bermondsey, London
	Price 18'; Alexander 45'; Alexander 54'	Report	Ibehre 29'; Hughes (yellow card) 90' (Dissent); Nicholls (yellow card) 90' (Unsporting behaviour)	Stadium: The Den; Attendance: 8,800; Referee: C Penton

10 April 2009	Yeovil Town	2–0	Millwall	Yeovil
	Obika 40'; Murtagh (yellow card) 42' (Unsporting behaviour); Tomlin 49'; Roberts (yellow card) 67' (Unsporting behaviour); Rodgers (yellow card) 88' (Unsporting behaviour)	Report	Dunne (yellow card) 26' (Unsporting behaviour); Dunne (yellow card) 72' (red card) (Second yellow card); Martin (yellow card) 79' (Unsporting behaviour); Laird (yellow card) 90' (Unsporting behaviour)	Stadium: Huish Park; Attendance: 6,230; Referee: A Hall

13 April 2009	Millwall	2–0	Peterborough United	Bermondsey, London
	Martin 25' (pen.); Price 58'; Alexander (yellow card) 90' (Unsporting behaviour)	Report	McLean (yellow card) 76' (Unsporting behaviour); Lee (yellow card) 90' (Unsporting behaviour)	Stadium: The Den; Attendance: 10,518; Referee: A Woolmer

18 April 2009	Bristol Rovers	4–2	Millwall	Horfield, Bristol
	Disley 12'; Lambert 32'; Anthony (yellow card) 36' (Unsporting behaviour); Kuffour 37'; Lambert 45'; Elliott (yellow card) 64' (Unsporting behaviour); Elliott (yellow card) 82' (red card) (Second yellow Card)	Report	Abdou 28'; Craig (yellow card) 36' (Unsporting behaviour); Dunne (yellow card) 40' (Unsporting behaviour); Alexander (red card) 45' (Deliberate handball); Barron (yellow card) 50' (Unsporting behaviour); Abdou 78'; Whitbread (yellow card) 84' (Unsporting behaviour)	Stadium: Memorial Stadium; Attendance: 6,618; Referee: P Gibbs

25 April 2009	Millwall	2–1	Leyton Orient	Bermondsey, London
	Alexander 70', 87'; Abdou (yellow card) 79'; Frampton (yellow card) 90'	Report	Church 47'	Stadium: The Den; Attendance: 11,414; Referee: Graham Horwood

2 May 2009	Carlisle United	2–0	Millwall	Carlisle
	Kavanagh 7'; Thirlwell 50'; Murphy (yellow card) 82'	Report		Stadium: Brunton Park; Attendance: 9,470; Referee: Neil Swarbrick

=== FA Cup ===
8 November 2008 First round	Chester City	0–3	Millwall	Chester
	Vaughan (yellow card) 81' (Dissent)	Report	Dunne (yellow card) 50' (Unsporting behaviour); Grabban (yellow card) 56' (Unsporting behaviour); Grabban 76'; Harris 79'; Grimes 90'	Stadium: Deva Stadium; Attendance: 1,932; Referee: R Beeby

29 November 2008 Second round	Millwall	3–0	Aldershot Town	The Den
	Alexander 30'; Hackett (yellow card) 35' (Unsporting behaviour); Craig (yellow card) 63' (Unsporting behaviour); Laird (yellow card) 70' (Unsporting behaviour); Alexander 77'; Grimes 88'	Report	Davies (yellow card) 78' (Unsporting behaviour)	Attendance: 6,159; Referee: G Horwood

3 January 2009 Third round	Millwall	2–2	Crewe Alexandra	The Den
	Frampton (yellow card) 20' (Unsporting behaviour); Laird 40'; Frampton 45+2'; Laird (yellow card) 58' (Unsporting behaviour); Kandol (yellow card) 68' (Unsporting behaviour); Fuseini (yellow card) 78' (Unsporting behaviour)	Report	Lawrence 12'; Brayford (yellow card) 45+2' (Unsporting behaviour); Shelley 58'; Donaldson (yellow card) 79' (Unsporting behaviour)	Attendance: 5,754; Referee: D Deadman

13 January 2009 Third round replay	Crewe Alexandra	2–3	Millwall	Crewe
	Murphy 7'; Miller 58'	Report	Barron 8'; Barron (yellow card) 23' (Unsporting behaviour); Harris 54'; Whitbread 86'	Stadium: Alexandra Stadium; Attendance: 3,060; Referee: N Miller

24 January 2009 Fourth round	Hull City	2–0	Millwall	Kingston upon Hull
	Turner 15'; Ashbee 84'; Folan (yellow card) 84' (Unsporting behaviour)	Report	Martin (yellow card) 44' (Unsporting behaviour); Harris (yellow card) 55' (Unsporting behaviour); Dunne (yellow card) 61' (Unsporting behaviour); Grimes (yellow card) 90' (Unsporting behaviour)	Stadium: KC Stadium; Attendance: 18,639; Referee: S Attwell

=== Football League Trophy ===
2 September 2008	Millwall	0–1	Colchester United	The Den
		Report	Perkins 8'	Attendance: 2,456; Referee: G Ward

=== League Cup ===
12 August 2008 First round	Millwall	0–1	Northampton Town	The Den
	Frampton (yellow card) 17' (Unsporting behaviour); Grabban (yellow card) 41' (Dissent); Hackett (yellow card) 60' (Unsporting behaviour)	Report	Crowe 16'; Doig (yellow card) 31' (Unsporting behaviour); Guttridge (yellow card) 42' (Unsporting behaviour); Bunn (yellow card) 84' (Timewasting)	Attendance: 3,525; Referee: C Penton
