= 2009–10 Millwall F.C. season =

Millwall
2009–10 season
- Chairman: John Berylson
- Manager: Kenny Jackett
- League One: 3rd (promoted via play-offs)
- FA Cup: 2nd round
- Carling Cup: 3rd round
- Top goalscorer: League: Steve Morison (21); All: Steve Morison (23)
- Highest home attendance: 17,632 vs Charlton Athletic (13 March 2010)
- Lowest home attendance: 6,617 vs Yeovil Town (29 September 2009)
- Average home league attendance: 10,834
| Home colours | Away colours |

The 2009–10 season was Millwall's 84th season in the Football League, and their 41st season and third consecutive in League One. Millwall were promoted back to the Championship via the play-offs, after finishing 3rd in the table. The club celebrated their 125th anniversary this season.

== Squad ==
Note: Flags indicate national team as defined under FIFA eligibility rules; some limited exceptions apply. Players may hold more than one non-FIFA nationality.

| No. | Pos. | Nation | Player |
|---|---|---|---|
| 1 | GK | IRL | David Forde |
| 2 | DF | IRL | Alan Dunne |
| 3 | DF | ENG | Andy Frampton |
| 4 | MF | ENG | Adam Bolder |
| 5 | DF | ENG | Paul Robinson |
| 7 | MF | ENG | Danny Schofield |
| 8 | FW | ENG | Gary Alexander |
| 9 | FW | ENG | Neil Harris |
| 10 | FW | ENG | Lewis Grabban |
| 11 | MF | ENG | Dave Martin |
| 12 | MF | ENG | Chris Hackett |
| 13 | GK | ENG | John Sullivan |
| 14 | DF | ENG | Danny Senda |
| 15 | DF | ENG | Tony Craig |
| 16 | DF | ENG | Scott Barron |
| 17 | MF | ENG | James Henry (on loan from Reading) |

| No. | Pos. | Nation | Player |
|---|---|---|---|
| 18 | DF | ENG | Darren Ward |
| 19 | FW | ENG | Ashley Grimes |
| 20 | FW | ENG | Steve Morison |
| 21 | DF | ENG | Jack Smith |
| 22 | MF | GHA | Ali Fuseini |
| 23 | FW | WAL | Jason Price |
| 24 | MF | SCO | Marc Laird |
| 26 | MF | FRA | Jimmy Abdou |
| 27 | DF | IRL | Pat O'Connor |
| 30 | DF | ENG | Marcus Bignot |
| 31 | FW | ENG | Kiernan Hughes-Mason |
| 32 | DF | ENG | Omar Beckles |
| 34 | FW | ENG | John Marquis |
| 36 | DF | NIR | Danny Fitzsimons |
| 40 | MF | ENG | Liam Trotter (on loan from Ipswich Town) |

== League table ==
| Pos | Team | Pld | W | D | L | GF | GA | GD | Pts | Promotion, qualification or relegation |
|---|---|---|---|---|---|---|---|---|---|---|
| 1 | Norwich City (C, P) | 46 | 29 | 8 | 9 | 89 | 47 | +42 | 95 | Promotion to Football League Championship |
| 2 | Leeds United (P) | 46 | 25 | 11 | 10 | 77 | 44 | +33 | 86 | Promotion to Football League Championship |
| 3 | Millwall (O, P) | 46 | 24 | 13 | 9 | 76 | 44 | +32 | 85 | Qualification for League One play-offs |
| 4 | Charlton Athletic | 46 | 23 | 15 | 8 | 71 | 48 | +23 | 84 | Qualification for League One play-offs |
| 5 | Swindon Town | 46 | 22 | 16 | 8 | 73 | 57 | +16 | 82 | Qualification for League One play-offs |

Source: The Football League
Rules for classification: 1) points; 2) goal difference; 3) number of goals scored.
(C) Champions; (O) Play-off winners; (P) Promoted
