= 2010 Football League One play-off final =

Association football match

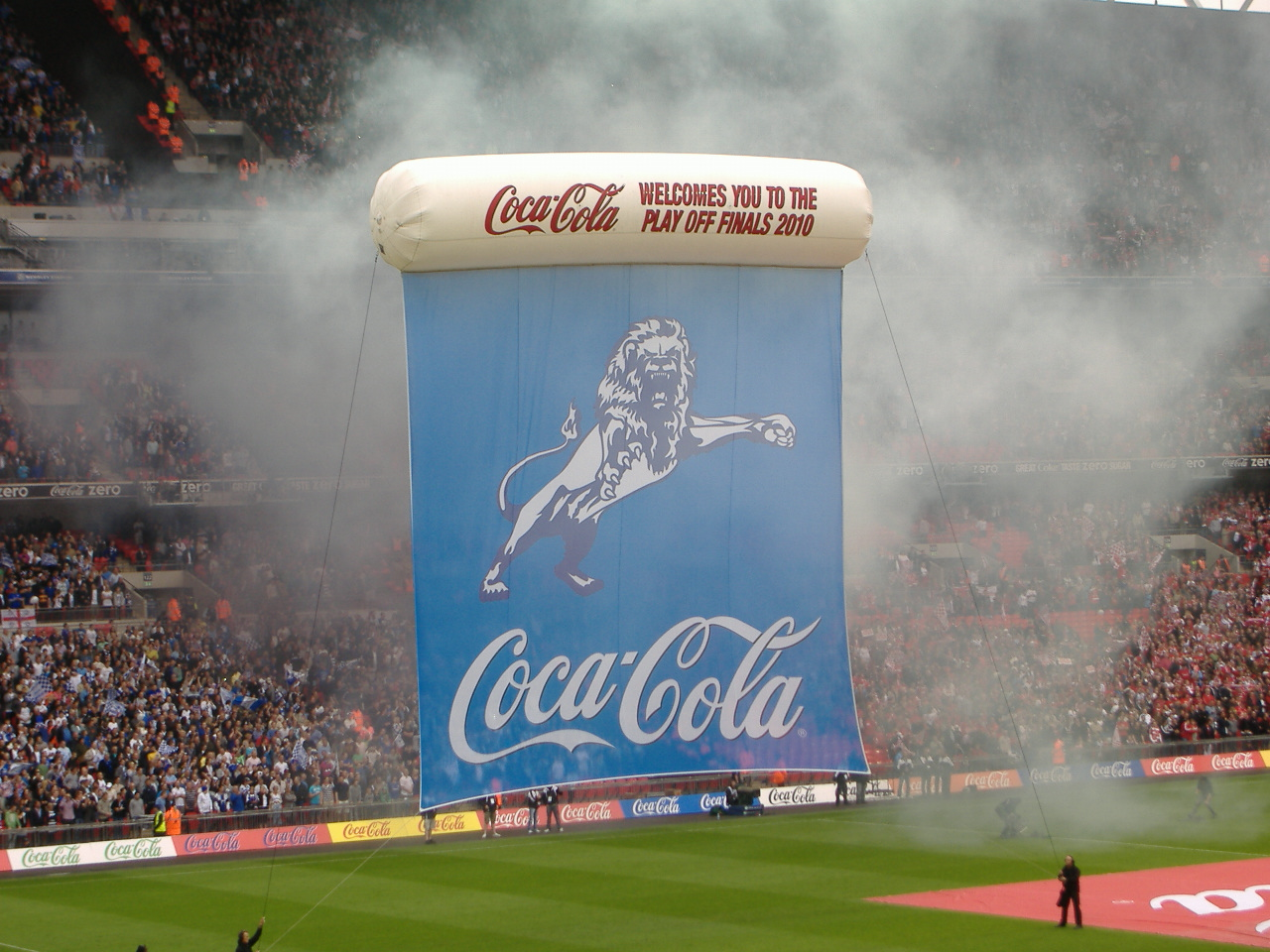
Millwall	Swindon Town
1	0
- Date: 29 May 2010
- Venue: Wembley Stadium, London
- Man of the Match: Paul Robinson (Millwall)
- Referee: Colin Webster
- Attendance: 73,108
- Weather: Wet and cold

The 2010 Football League One play-off final was an association football match which was played on 29 May 2010 at Wembley Stadium, London, between Millwall and Swindon Town to determine the third and final team to gain promotion from Football League One to the Football League Championship. The top two teams of the 2009–10 Football League One season, Norwich City and Leeds United, gained automatic promotion to the Championship, while the teams placed from third to sixth place in the table took part in play-off semi-finals; the winners of these semi-finals competed for the final place for the 2010–11 season in the Championship. Charlton Athletic and Huddersfield Town were the losing semi-finalists, having been defeated by Swindon and Millwall respectively.

The referee for the match, which was played in front of 73,108 spectators, was Colin Webster. Both sides failed to capitalise on early chances to score, while an own-goal header by Swindon's Kevin Amankwaah was disallowed, as Millwall's Liam Trotter had been offside in the build-up. Steve Morison's shot was then blocked before Paul Robinson scored to make it 1–0 to Millwall: Scott Cuthbert's header from Danny Schofield's corner fell to Robinson who struck from close range. In the 72nd minute, a through-ball from Robinson sent Charlie Austin clear but his shot was high over the Millwall crossbar with only the goalkeeper to beat. Austin saw the final chance of the match pushed round the post by Millwall goalkeeper David Forde to ensure the match ended 1–0. Millwall were promoted to the Championship in their first success in the play-offs in six attempts.

Swindon Town ended their following season bottom of the League One table and were relegated to League Two. Millwall's next season saw them finish in ninth place in the Championship, three positions and eight points outside the play-offs.

== Route to the final ==
Football League One final table, leading positions
Pos	Team	Pld	W	D	L	GF	GA	GD	Pts
1	Norwich City	46	29	8	9	89	47	+42	95
2	Leeds United	46	25	11	10	77	44	+33	86
3	Millwall	46	24	13	9	76	44	+32	85
4	Charlton Athletic	46	23	15	8	71	48	+23	84
5	Swindon Town	46	22	16	8	73	57	+16	82
6	Huddersfield Town	46	23	11	12	82	56	+26	80

Millwall finished the regular 2009–10 season in third place in Football League One, the third tier of the English football league system, two places ahead of Swindon Town. Both therefore missed out on the two automatic places for promotion to the Football League Championship and instead took part in the play-offs to determine the third promoted team. Millwall finished one point behind Leeds United (who were promoted in second place) and ten behind league winners Norwich City. Swindon Town ended the season a further three points behind Millwall. Southampton would have finished the season in fifth position in League One but they had been penalised with a ten-point deduction as a result of the club's parent company going into administration.

Swindon Town's opponents for their play-off semi-final were Charlton Athletic with the first match of the two-legged tie taking place at the County Ground in Swindon on 14 May 2010. The home side dominated the first half but it ended goalless. Early in the second half, Charlton's Nicky Bailey saw his curling shot hit the inside of a Swindon goalpost. Charlie Austin put Swindon ahead on 52 minutes with a header from Alan Sheehan's cross. Eight minutes later, Simon Ferry and Darren Ward had a two-on-one with Darren Randolph after a quick break and Ward scored with a low shot to make it 2–0. Deon Burton headed past David Lucas in the Swindon goal in the 65th minute following a long pass from Randolph to halve the deficit; the match ended 2–1. The second leg of the semi-final was played three days later at the Valley in Charlton. Within five minutes of the start, Lucas was forced off with a shoulder injury and was replaced by Phil Smith. Charlton controlled the first half and went ahead with an own goal from Ferry in the 27th minute. In stoppage time, the home side doubled their lead with a 16-yard (15 m) strike from Dave Mooney. Midway through the second half, Gordon Greer was sent off for Swindon after a high challenge on Burton, but on 74 minutes Ward scored to level the tie on aggregate. Miguel Llera was then sent off for Charlton after dragging down Austin and the game went into extra time. With no further goals in the additional 30 minutes, the tie went to a penalty shootout. Bailey missed Charlton's second spot kick and with all other penalties being converted, Swindon won 5–4 and progressed to the final.

Millwall faced Huddersfield Town in their play-off semi-final with the first leg being held at the Galpharm Stadium in Huddersfield on 15 May 2010. The visitors seldom threatened during the first half but saw two penalty appeals turned down by the referee, and the match ended goalless. The second leg took place three days later at the New Den in London. Steve Morison opened the scoring midway through the first half when the ball fell to him at short range after Huddersfield goalkeeper Alex Smithies pushed out a cross. Scott Barron then struck the crossbar before Paul Robinson scored from a corner with eight minutes remaining to make it 2–0 which remained the final score and saw Millwall qualify for the final.

== Match ==
=== Background ===
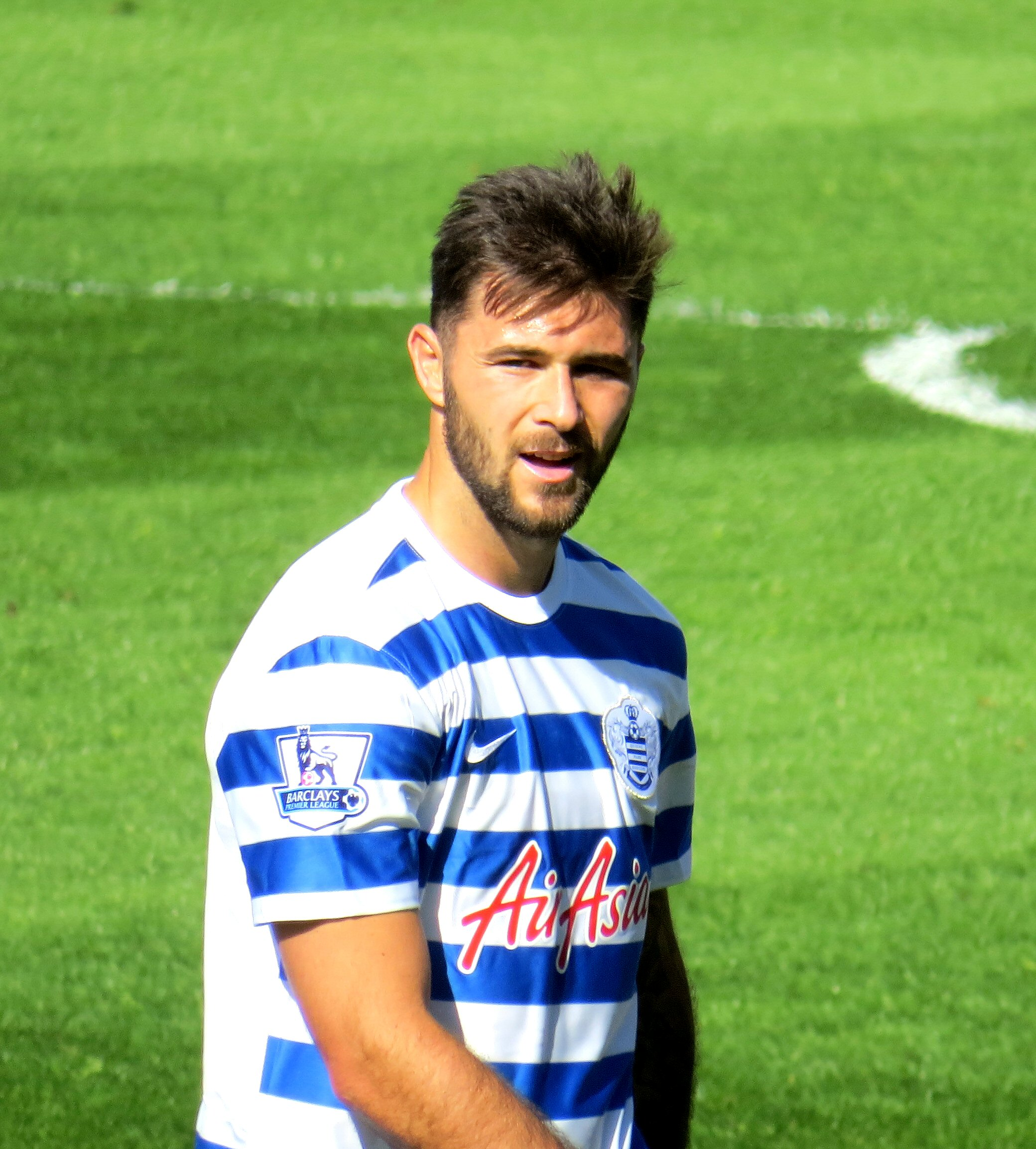
Charlie Austin (pictured in 2015) had scored 19 league goals for Swindon Town during the regular season.

This was Swindon's sixth trip to the play-offs and their fourth final, having gained promotion in the 1987 Football League Third Division play-off final, the 1990 Football League Second Division play-off final (before being relegated due to financial irregularities) and the 1993 Football League First Division play-off final. They had played in League One since being promoted in the 2006–07 season. Millwall had also participated in the play-offs on five previous occasions; they had failed to progress past the semi-finals other than in the previous season, when they had lost 3–2 to Scunthorpe in the final. They had been relegated to League One in the 2005–06 season.

In the matches between the sides during the regular season, the first encounter at the County Ground in October 2009 ended in a 1–1 draw while the return match at the New Den the following May was a 3–2 victory for Millwall. Swindon's top scorer during the regular season was Billy Paynter who had scored 29 goals (26 in the league, 1 in the FA Cup and 2 in the League Cup), followed by Austin with 19 (all in the league). Top marksmen for Millwall were Morison, who had scored 22 goals during the regular season (20 in the league and 2 in the FA Cup) and Neil Harris with 18 (13 in the league, 1 in the FA Cup and 4 in the League Cup). According to The Daily Telegraph, winning the match was worth £5 million to the successful club.

The referee for the final was Colin Webster. Millwall made one change to the side that beat Huddersfield in the play-off semi final with Jack Smith being replaced by Shaun Batt. Swindon's starting eleven for the final saw two changes to the side that started the play-off second leg against Charlton: Kevin Amankwaah and Sheehan came in for Stephen Darby and Greer. The match was broadcast live in the UK on Sky Sports with radio commentary on BBC Radio 5 Live. Both sides adopted a 4–4–2 formation.

=== Summary ===
Millwall kicked off the match in cold and wet conditions at around 3 p.m. on 29 May 2010 in front of 73,108 spectators at Wembley Stadium, London. Seven minutes in, the first opportunity fell to Harris who beat the offside trap before running into the Swindon penalty area. His chip was pushed behind the goal-line by Swindon goalkeeper Lucas but the subsequent corner came to nothing. A short backpass from Scott Cuthbert allowed Morison an opportunity but Lucas cleared the ball. Two minutes later Morison's lob went over the crossbar after he had received a pass from Danny Schofield. In the 28th minute, Austin's strike from distance went over Millwall's goal before Swindon's Amankwaah headed the ball into his own net; the referee disallowed the own goal as Liam Trotter had been adjudged offside in the build-up. Morisons's shot was then blocked before Robinson scored in the 39th minute to make it 1–0 to Millwall: Cuthbert's header from Schofield's corner fell to Robinson who struck from close range. Minutes before half-time, Millwall were forced to make the first change of the afternoon with Tony Craig coming off with a foot injury and being replaced by Andy Frampton. The half ended with the score 1–0.

Neither side made any personnel changes during the interval and two minutes after the second half kicked off, Swindon's first opportunity came through a free kick after Millwall's goalkeeper David Forde carried the ball out of the box. Sheehan took the set piece but his curling strike was cleared. Swindon maintained their pressure but both Schofield and Trotter had close shots for Millwall. Swindon's Lecsinel Jean-François then saw his header saved by a diving Forde before Millwall's Morison despatched a weak shot from inside the opposition area. In the 67th minute, Darby came on to replace Sheehan for Swindon before Millwall's Chris Hackett was brought on for Batt. Five minutes later, a through-ball from Robinson allowed Austin to run clear of the defenders but his shot was high over the crossbar with only the goalkeeper to beat. In the 73rd minute, Alan O'Brien replaced Jon-Paul McGovern in Swindon's second substitution. On 80 minutes, Jean-François became the first player to be shown the yellow card for a foul on Morison. Shortly thereafter, Vincent Péricard came on to replace Paynter. Late pressure from Swindon failed to produce any goals, and Austin saw the final chance of the match pushed round the post by Forde to ensure the match ended 1–0 and Millwall were promoted to the Championship.

=== Details ===
29 May 2010
15:00 BST

Millwall	1–0	Swindon Town
Robinson 39'	Report

Wembley Stadium, London
Attendance: 73,108
Referee: Colin Webster

Millwall	Swindon Town

GK	1	David Forde
RB	16	Scott Barron
CB	5	Paul Robinson (c)
CB	18	Darren Ward
LB	15	Tony Craig	(substituted off) 44'
RM	7	Danny Schofield
CM	40	Liam Trotter
CM	26	Jimmy Abdou
LM	25	Shaun Batt	(substituted off) 70'
CF	20	Steve Morison
CF	9	Neil Harris
Substitutes:
GK	13	John Sullivan
DF	3	Andy Frampton	(substituted on) 44'
MF	12	Chris Hackett	(substituted on) 70'
MF	22	Ali Fuseini
MF	24	Marc Laird
FW	8	Gary Alexander
FW	30	Jonathan Obika
Manager:
Kenny Jackett

GK	1	David Lucas
RB	15	Kevin Amankwaah
CB	2	Scott Cuthbert
CB	19	Lecsinel Jean-François (yellow card) 80'
LB	3	Alan Sheehan	(substituted off) 67'
RM	7	Jon-Paul McGovern	(substituted off) 73'
CM	4	Jonathan Douglas (c)
CM	30	Simon Ferry
LM	24	Danny Ward
CF	32	Charlie Austin
CF	20	Billy Paynter	(substituted off) 81'
Substitutes:
GK	12	Phil Smith
DF	14	Sean Morrison
DF	21	Stephen Darby	(substituted on) 67'
MF	8	Craig Easton
MF	10	Michael Timlin
MF	18	Alan O'Brien	(substituted on) 73'
FW	5	Vincent Péricard	(substituted on) 81'
Manager:
Danny Wilson

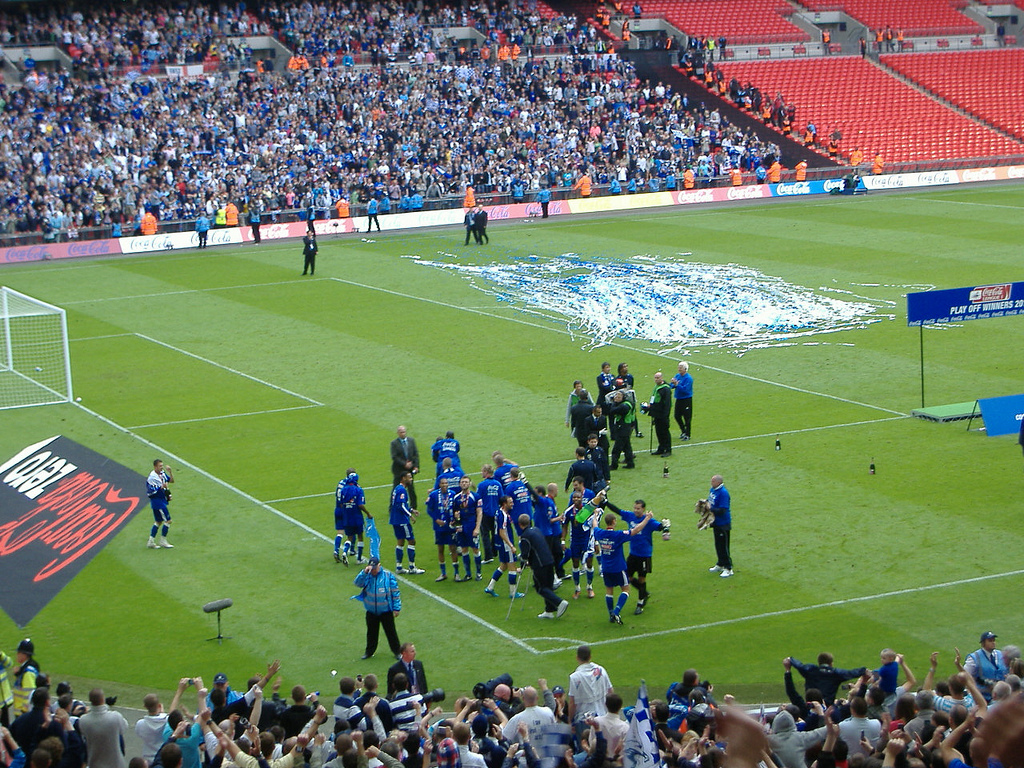
Millwall players celebrating their victory after the match

Statistics
Statistic	Millwall	Swindon Town
Total shots	21	8
Shots on target	8	4
Ball possession	50%	50%
Corner kicks	13	3
Fouls committed	14	6
Yellow cards	0	1
Red cards	0	0

== Post-match ==
Kenny Jackett, the winning manager, said that his club would "look forward now quickly though because we want to compete next season, without a doubt" but also reflected on recent defeats in the play-offs: "I'm so proud to be the first man to lead Millwall to victory at Wembley and I can't wait to lead these boys out in the Championship." His counterpart Danny Wilson spoke of Austin's late chance: "The boy didn't miss it, the ball bobbled and the pitch dictated. When he went through you'd put your house on him." Paynter concurred, saying "[Austin] thought it was his fault but the pitch played its part." Winning goalscorer Robinson was jubilant and recalled that "to score the winning goal and lift a trophy at Wembley ... that's all I ever dreamt of."

Swindon Town ended their following season bottom of the League One table and were relegated to League Two. Wilson had resigned as manager in March 2011 with the side in the bottom four of the division, with Paynter, Greer and Austin all having left club earlier in the season. Millwall's next season saw them finish in ninth place in the Championship, three positions and eight points outside the play-offs.
