= Preston Edwards =

English association football player (born 1989)

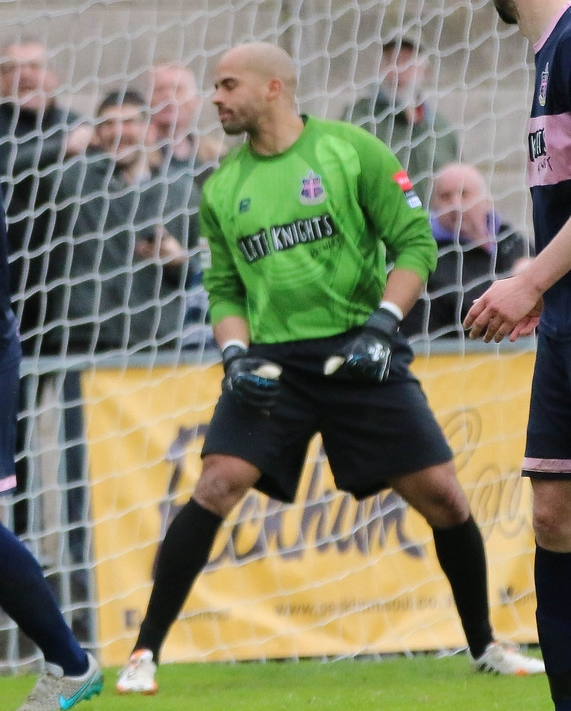
- Edwards playing for Dulwich Hamlet in 2016

Personal information
- Full name: Preston Matthew Edwards
- Date of birth: 5 September 1989 (age 37)
- Place of birth: Cheshunt, England
- Height: 6 ft 0 in (1.83 m)
- Position: Goalkeeper

Team information
- Current team: Dulwich Hamlet

Senior career*
Years	Team	Apps	(Gls)
2006–2009	Millwall	1	(0)
2009	→ Dover Athletic (loan)	13	(0)
2009–2010	Grays Athletic	20	(0)
2010–2016	Ebbsfleet United	174	(0)
2015–2016	→ Boreham Wood (loan)	6	(0)
2016	→ Dulwich Hamlet (loan)	12	(0)
2016–2020	Dulwich Hamlet	123	(0)
2020	→ Cheshunt (loan)	2	(0)
2020	Dartford	0	(0)
2020	Brentwood Town	3	(0)
2020–2022	Braintree Town	12	(0)
2022–2023	Cheshunt	14	(0)
2023	Potters Bar Town	10	(0)
2023–	Dulwich Hamlet	0	(0)

International career
2006	England U17	1	(0)
2006	England U18	1	(0)
2011	England C	1	(0)
- * Club domestic league appearances and goals as of 17:05, 9 October 2023 (UTC)

Preston Matthew Edwards (born 5 September 1989) is an English footballer who plays as a goalkeeper for Dulwich Hamlet.

== Club career ==
On 4 September 2007, Edwards made his first professional appearance for Millwall when coming on as a sub against Swansea City in the Football League Trophy first round.

In January 2009, he joined Isthmian League Premier Division club Dover Athletic on loan after an injury to the club's first-choice goalkeeper, John Whitehouse. He made his debut in a 0–0 draw against local rivals Ramsgate. Whilst at Dover Athletic, he helped them secure the title and promotion to the Conference South. On 22 June 2009, he rejected a new one-year deal from Millwall, and was therefore out of contract and released.

At the start of the 2009–10 season, Edwards signed for Grays Athletic along with eight other players. On 24 March 2010, Edwards played in a behind closed doors reserve match for Crystal Palace against Millwall. He was released at the end of the 2009–10 season.

Edwards signed for Ebbsfleet United on 28 July 2010, after a successful trial period.

He became a YouTube sensation in February 2011, racking up over eight million views (as of late June 2014), after being sent off just ten seconds into a 3–0 defeat to Farnborough. This is believed to be a record for a goalkeeper. Despite this setback, Preston became a fan favourite amongst club fans and a key asset for the club. After promotion, Preston asserted himself as Ebbsfleet number one before an ankle injury cut his season short. Despite the club finishing second bottom of the Conference Premier in the 2012–13 season, Edwards drew praise from many for his performances throughout the season and went on to dominate the club's end of season awards ceremony, winning a large majority of the trophies on offer including the Players player of the year and the Fans player of the year award. Although it was rumoured that his services were wanted by John Still, the recently appointed manager of Luton Town, Edwards signed a new contract with the club, keeping him on for the 2013–14 season.

Edwards continued as the club's first-choice goalkeeper for the 2013–14 season and was kept on for the 2014-15 campaign. During that season, his spot as the club's first choice goalkeeper was challenged by Brandon Hall. Manager Jamie Day brought him back into the team for the FA Trophy clash with Forest Green Rovers on 10 January in which he helped secure a 1–0 win. Edwards made his 200th appearance for the club in the 2–2 draw with Hemel Hempstead Town in late February.

Ahead of the 2015–16 season, Edwards joined newly promoted National League side Boreham Wood on a season-long loan deal. However the deal was cut short with Edwards making only six league appearances, and he went on to join Isthmian League Premier Division side Dulwich Hamlet on loan on 20 February 2016 for the remainder of the season.

With his contract at Ebbsfleet expiring, Edwards signed for Dulwich Hamlet ahead of the 2016–17 season, going on to make 66 appearances in all competitions in his first full season at the club.

In January 2022, Edwards returned to Cheshunt having spent time with the club on loan in 2020. At the end of the season, he signed for Potters Bar Town.

On 7 October 2023, Edwards' return to Dulwich Hamlet was announced.

== International career ==
In October 2010 Edwards was called up to the England C team for the first time.

== Family ==
His sister Steph reached the final of the 2013 series of Britain's Got Talent as part of the band Luminites.

== Career statistics ==
As of match played 30 September 2023

Appearances and goals by club, season and competition
Club	Season	League			FA Cup		League Cup		Other		Total	
Club	Season	Division	Apps	Goals	Apps	Goals	Apps	Goals	Apps	Goals	Apps	Goals
Millwall	2007–08	League One	1	0	0	0	0	0	1 (Note: Appearance(s) in Football League Trophy)	0	2	0
Millwall	2008–09	League One	0	0	0	0	0	0	0	0	0	0
Millwall	Total		1	0	0	0	0	0	1	0	2	0
Dover Athletic (loan)	2008–09	Isthmian League Premier Division	13	0	—		—		—		13	0
Grays Athletic	2009–10	Conference Premier	20	0	0	0	—		0	0	20	0
Ebbsfleet United	2010–11	Conference South	41	0	3	0	—		2 (Note: Appearance(s) in FA Trophy)	0	46	0
Ebbsfleet United	2011–12	Conference Premier	31	0	1	0	—		3	0	35	0
Ebbsfleet United	2012–13	Conference Premier	43	0	2	0	—		1	0	46	0
Ebbsfleet United	2013–14	Conference South	44	0	2	0	—		3	0	49	0
Ebbsfleet United	2014–15	Conference South	15	0	0	0	—		4	0	19	0
Ebbsfleet United	2015–16	National League South	0	0	—		—		0	0	0	0
Ebbsfleet United	Total		174	0	8	0	—		13	0	195	0
Boreham Wood (loan)	2015–16	National League	6	0	1	0	—		0	0	7	0
Dulwich Hamlet (loan)	2015–16	Isthmian League Premier Division	12	0	—		—		2 (Note: Appearance(s) in Isthmian League Premier Division play-offs)	0	14	0
Dulwich Hamlet	2016–17	Isthmian League Premier Division	44	0	2	0	—		17 (Note: Five appearances in Alan Turvey Trophy, ten in FA Trophy, two in Isthmian League Premier Division play-offs)	0	63	0
Dulwich Hamlet	2017–18	Isthmian League Premier Division	34	0	2	0	—		3 (Note: One appearance in Alan Turvey Trophy, two in FA Trophy)	0	39	0
Dulwich Hamlet	2018–19	National League South	40	0	2	0	—		3	0	45	0
Dulwich Hamlet	2019–20	National League South	5	0	0	0	—		2	0	7	0
Dulwich Hamlet	Total		123	0	6	0	—		25	0	154	0
Cheshunt (loan)	2019–20	Isthmian League Premier Division	2	0	0	0	—		0	0	2	0
Dartford	2019–20	National League South	0	0	—		—		0	0	0	0
Brentwood Town	2020–21	Isthmian League North Division	3	0	3	0	—		0	0	6	0
Braintree Town	2020–21	National League South	6	0	—		—		0	0	6	0
Braintree Town	2021–22	National League South	6	0	1	0	—		0	0	7	0
Braintree Town	Total		12	0	1	0	—		0	0	13	0
Cheshunt	2021–22	Isthmian League Premier Division	18	0	—		—		5 (Note: One appearance in the FA Trophy, two in the Alan Turvey Trophy, two in the Isthmian League Premier Division play-offs)	0	23	0
Cheshunt	2022–23	National League South	14	0	1	0	—		0	0	15	0
Cheshunt	Total		32	0	1	0	—		5	0	38	0
Potters Bar Town	2023–24	Isthmian League Premier Division	10	0	1	0	—		0	0	11	0
Career total			408	0	21	0	0	0	46	0	475	0

== Honours ==
Ebbsfleet United

Conference South play-off winners: 2010–2011
