= Bukta =

British sportswear brand

- Type: Brand
- Industry: Textile
- Founded: 1879; 147 years ago as "E.R. Buck and Sons"
- Founder: Edward Robinson Buck
- Fate: Company sold in 1982; remains as a brand
- Headquarters: Brinksway, Stockport, UK
- Area served: Europe
- Products: Sportswear

Bukta is an English sportswear brand which was founded in 1879 in Stockport, Cheshire. Originally a private manufacturer, the family business gained recognition for having produced football and rugby equipment for many teams in the United Kingdom.

It was also, for much of the 20th century, a leading brand of tents and camping equipment.

== History ==
E.R. Buck & Sons was founded in 1879, mainly producing shorts for soldiers fighting in the Boer Wars. In 1884, football team Nottingham Forest was pictured wearing kit produced by Bukta. Later Newcastle United and others were wearing kit made by Bukta.

In 1885, Bukta moved into a new factory at Woodside in Poynton, leased from Lord Vernon, employing fewer than 30 people. It was one of the first companies to produce uniforms for the Scout Movement and Girl Guides and produced underwear and hospital and tropical uniforms for the British Army for the First World War. In 1920, Bucks bought the factory in the sale of the Vernon Estate. In 1923, 'E.R. Buck and Sons' became a limited company; by that time it employed between 130 and 200 people.

In 1943, the factory in Poynton was closed and the company moved to a factory at Brinksway, Stockport. Members of the Buck family ran the company until 1982 when a consortium led by Hugh Fraser purchased it.

Between 1974-'80, they manufactured the players' kit for Charlton Athletic F.C.

In 2005, the Bukta brand was relaunched, having had millions of pounds spent on it, after an absence of more than six years, as a brand for up-market independent stores. Much of Bukta's design and distribution is outsourced to the Cavden Group.
