= Alan Dunne =

Irish association football player

Personal information
- Full name: Alan James Dunne
- Date of birth: 23 August 1982 (age 44)
- Place of birth: Dublin, Ireland
- Height: 5 ft 10 in (1.78 m)
- Positions: Right back; midfielder; central defender

Team information
- Current team: Tonbridge Angels (manager)

Youth career
- –2000: Millwall

Senior career*
Years	Team	Apps	(Gls)
2000–2015	Millwall	341	(17)
2015–2017	Leyton Orient	13	(0)
2017–2020	Bromley	38	(0)
Total		392	(17)

Managerial career
- 2021: Bromley (caretaker)
- 2025–: Tonbridge Angels
- * Club domestic league appearances and goals

Alan James Dunne (born 23 August 1982) is an Irish football manager and former player who played as a right back. He played in the English Football League for Millwall and Leyton Orient as well as in non-league football for Bromley. He is currently manager of National League South club Tonbridge Angels.

== Early life ==
Dunne was born in Dublin, County Dublin.

== Career ==
Dunne started his career with Millwall's youth system, before signing a professional contract in March 2000. He made his first-team debut on 19 March 2002 against Sheffield United. At the end of the 2009–10 season, Dunne was awarded Player of the Year. He was sent off a record ten times for Millwall and also received 85 yellow cards in his Millwall career. Dunne was released by Millwall at the end of the 2014–15 season after 22 years at the club.

On 27 July 2015, Dunne signed for newly relegated League Two club Leyton Orient on a two-year contract. He left Orient by mutual consent on 18 January 2017.

On 20 January 2017, Dunne signed for National League club Bromley. He made his debut for the club in a 3–1 home victory over Southport on 28 January.

== Coaching career ==
In June 2018, Dunne was appointed first-team coach with Bromley, continuing to feature for the first-team. Having been promoted to the role of assistant manager, he was appointed joint-caretaker manager following the departure of Neil Smith in March 2021. He departed the club in February 2025.

On 22 September 2025, Dunne was appointed manager of National League South club Tonbridge Angels.

== Personal life ==
Dunne has been married to his wife Aimee since 2009, with whom he has had two children.

== Career statistics ==
Appearances and goals by club, season and competition
Club	Season	League			FA Cup		League Cup		Other		Total	
Club	Season	Division	Apps	Goals	Apps	Goals	Apps	Goals	Apps	Goals	Apps	Goals
Millwall	2001–02	First Division	1	0	0	0	0	0	—		1	0
Millwall	2002–03	First Division	4	0	0	0	0	0	—		4	0
Millwall	2003–04	First Division	8	0	0	0	1	0	—		9	0
Millwall	2004–05	Championship	19	3	1	0	1	0	0	0	21	3
Millwall	2005–06	Championship	40	0	1	0	4	2	—		45	2
Millwall	2006–07	League One	32	6	3	1	1	0	0	0	36	7
Millwall	2007–08	League One	19	3	2	1	1	0	1 (Note: Appearance in Football League Trophy)	0	23	4
Millwall	2008–09	League One	24	0	5	0	0	0	3 (Note: Appearances in League One play-offs)	0	32	0
Millwall	2009–10	League One	32	2	4	1	2	0	1	0	39	3
Millwall	2010–11	Championship	39	0	0	0	3	1	—		42	1
Millwall	2011–12	Championship	30	0	3	0	2	0	—		35	0
Millwall	2012–13	Championship	25	1	4	0	0	0	—		29	1
Millwall	2013–14	Championship	29	0	1	0	0	0	—		30	0
Millwall	2014–15	Championship	39	2	2	0	1	0	—		42	2
Millwall	Total		341	17	26	3	16	3	5	0	388	23
Leyton Orient	2015–16	League Two	8	0	1	0	1	0	0	0	10	0
Leyton Orient	2016–17	League Two	5	0	1	0	0	0	2 (Note: Appearances in EFL Trophy)	0	8	0
Leyton Orient	Total		13	0	2	0	1	0	2	0	18	0
Bromley	2016–17	National League	16	0	—		—		—		16	0
Bromley	2017–18	National League	16	0	3	0	—		0	0	19	0
Bromley	2018–19	National League	5	0	0	0	—		0	0	5	0
Bromley	2019–20	National League	1	0	0	0	—		0	0	1	0
Bromley	Total		38	0	3	0	—		0	0	41	0
Career total			392	17	31	3	17	3	7	0	447	23

== Honours ==
Millwall

- FA Cup runner-up: 2003–04

Bromley

- FA Trophy runner-up: 2017–18

Individual

- Millwall Player of the Year: 2009–10
