= Zak Whitbread =

American soccer player (born 1984)

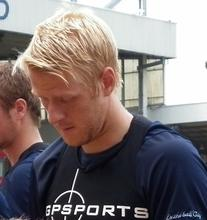
- Whitbread training with Norwich City in 2011

Personal information
- Full name: Zak Benjamin Whitbread
- Date of birth: March 4, 1984 (age 42)
- Place of birth: Houston, Texas, United States
- Height: 6 ft 2 in (1.88 m)
- Position: Center-back

Youth career
- 1992−2003: Liverpool

Senior career*
Years	Team	Apps	(Gls)
2003−2006	Liverpool	0	(0)
2005−2006	→ Millwall (loan)	25	(0)
2006−2010	Millwall	78	(3)
2010−2012	Norwich City	44	(1)
2012−2014	Leicester City	16	(1)
2013−2014	→ Derby County (loan)	4	(1)
2014−2015	Derby County	9	(0)
2015−2016	Shrewsbury Town	22	(1)
Total		198	(7)

International career
2003	United States U20	5	(1)
- * Club domestic league appearances and goals

Zak Benjamin Whitbread (born March 4, 1984) is an American retired professional soccer player who played as a defender.

== Early life ==
Although born in Houston, Texas, United States, Whitbread has spent most of his life in England and Singapore. He has lived in Runcorn for most of his life, except for the five years in Singapore when his father, Barry Whitbread, was the Singapore national football team coach during the late 1990s. While in Singapore, Whitbread attended St Stephen's School and then United World College of South East Asia.

== Club career ==
=== Liverpool ===
While growing up in Runcorn, Whitbread was a fan of Manchester United, but joined Liverpool's Centre of Excellence at the age of eight and worked his way through the academy from under-15s through under-19s before joining the reserve team in 2003.

His first match in a Liverpool jersey occurred in 2003 in an exhibition match against Thailand during the club's Far East Tour. He came on to the pitch after the start of the second half, replacing Neil Mellor. Whitbread made his first team debut on 26 October 2004 in a 3–0 Carling Cup win over Millwall at The New Den, and played several games alongside Sami Hyypiä in Liverpool's 2005–06 UEFA Champions League qualification campaign. He spent much of the season on loan at Millwall.

=== Millwall ===
After signing for Millwall permanently on a three-year contract in June 2006, he featured frequently in the team's first eleven, starting 18 games for his new club in the 2006–07 season, before injuring himself in September 2006. The injury sidelined him for the rest of that season.

Over the course of the 2008–09 season, Whitbread made 44 appearances, including the League One play-off final at Wembley Stadium, which Millwall lost 3–2 to Scunthorpe United.

=== Norwich City ===
Whitbread signed for Norwich City on a 2 1/2-year contract on January 8, 2010, making his debut in the 5–0 win over Colchester United on January 16 as a substitute for Chris Martin, but featured little thereafter due to an injury. Whitbread was given squad number 6 ahead of the 2010–11 season, switching from 31. He played 3 games in pre-season 2010–11 before he sustained another injury, which ruled him out of the start of the new league season. Whitbread was expected to return to training near the time of the international break in September; however, a further setback kept him out until the new Year. Whitbread returned to full training near Christmas 2010, along with Adam Drury.

He made his long-awaited return from injury in a 4–2 win over Sheffield United on December 28, 2010, as an 85th-minute substitute for Anthony McNamee. He made his first start of the season in a 1–0 victory over league leaders Queens Park Rangers, helping Norwich to a first clean sheet in 10 games. Due to Leon Barnett's hamstring injury, Whitbread developed a center back partnership with Elliott Ward. He scored his first goal for Norwich in a 1–1 draw against Hull City at the KC Stadium on March 19, 2011.

Whitbread started in the Canaries' first game back in the Premier League, partnering Ritchie De Laet in a 1–1 draw at Wigan Athletic. However, he got a knee injury in this match, meaning he was ruled out for the following match against Stoke City. He returned for the League Cup match against MK Dons and started against Chelsea, but was withdrawn after 30 minutes with a suspected hamstring injury. Whitbread returned to training in November. He and Daniel Ayala got through a practice match, improving their fitness. Whitbread was back in the squad in early December.

He returned to the Norwich squad on December 3 against Manchester City as an unused substitute. In the next fixture against Newcastle United, Whitbread was given a start in a 4–2 win for Norwich, playing well apart from giving the ball away for Demba Ba's second goal. Whitbread kept his place for the following matches, performing admirably with Russell Martin in defence. He was partnered with Daniel Ayala from the New Year's Eve fixture against Fulham, and this partnership has seen Norwich win two consecutive away matches and three wins out of three in 2012. Whitbread was withdrawn early in the 2–0 victory over Bolton Wanderers, along with Daniel Ayala, after complaining of a tight hamstring, 20 minutes after Ayala was subbed due to a suspected hamstring tear. He immediately regained his place upon his return to fitness, again at the expense of Leon Barnett in the narrow 2–1 defeat to Manchester United. He suffered a minor calf injury before the 2–2 draw against Everton, causing manager Paul Lambert to withdraw him from the squad. He was eventually released by the club at the conclusion of the season.

=== Leicester City ===
On July 24, 2012, Whitbread signed a two-year contract with Championship side Leicester City on a free transfer following the end of his contract at Norwich. He made his debut on August 28, 2012, against Burton Albion in the League Cup. Whitbread scored his first goal for Leicester City, from a Martyn Waghorn corner, during a 4–1 win against local rivals Derby County on December 1, 2012. After which, he was named in the Championship Team of the Week. He was released by Leicester on May 9, 2014.

=== Derby County ===
On September 29, 2013, Derby County announced that Whitbread had signed a three-month loan deal. He scored on his debut in a 4–4 draw at home to Ipswich Town.

At the end of the 2013–14 season, Whitbread was released by Leicester City. On June 25, 2014, Whitbread agreed a one-year deal to join Derby County permanently.

=== Shrewsbury Town ===
Following his release from Derby, Whitbread joined Shrewsbury Town in League One in October 2015, despite considering a move to the United States. Initially signing a short-term contract running until January 2016, he made his Shrewsbury debut in an unfamiliar midfield role, coming on as a substitute in a 2−1 away defeat at Scunthorpe United. A week later, he made his first start for the club, playing the full ninety minutes of a 2−0 home win over Bury. His contract was later extended to the end of the season, when he was subsequently released.

== International career ==
Whitbread's first opportunity to play for the national team of his country of birth came in August 2003 when he was called up to Thomas Rongen's U.S. under-20s squad, and traveled to Spain for the L'Alcudia International Tournament, where he started three of the five matches played. He was also named on Rongen's side for the 2003 World Youth Championships in December. He started every match and scored his first goal for the U.S. to help the squad reach the quarter-finals. His play led to his inclusion with the mostly Major League Soccer based side that unsuccessfully tried to qualify the U.S. for the 2004 Summer Olympics. He could only play in one match for Glenn Myernick due to an injury he suffered during training. He played for the United States under-20s team in the 2003 FIFA World Youth Championship, and has since been promoted to the under-23 squad.

On March 16, 2011, Whitbread was called into the United States senior team's camp for its friendlies against Argentina and Paraguay, but was unable to feature due to sustaining an injury while on club duty.
