= Scott Barron =

English footballer

Personal information
- Full name: Scott Barron
- Date of birth: 2 September 1985 (age 41)
- Place of birth: Preston, England
- Height: 5 ft 10 in (1.78 m)
- Positions: Left back; left midfielder

Youth career
- 1995–2004: Ipswich Town

Senior career*
Years	Team	Apps	(Gls)
2004–2007	Ipswich Town	15	(0)
2007	→ Wrexham (loan)	3	(0)
2007–2012	Millwall	110	(2)
2012–2014	Brentford	14	(0)
Total		142	(2)
- * Club domestic league appearances and goals

Scott Barron (born 2 September 1985) is an English retired professional footballer who played in all three divisions of the Football League for Millwall, Ipswich Town, Wrexham and Brentford as a left back. He over 130 appearances for Millwall and was a member of the club's 2010 League One play-off final-winning team. A long-standing hip injury led to Barron's retirement in 2014.

== Career ==
=== Ipswich Town ===
Born in Preston, Lancashire and growing up in St Ives, Cambridgeshire, Barron joined Ipswich Town's academy at the age of 10 after being spotted playing in St Ives. Adept as left back or a left midfielder, Barron's first involvement with the first team came on 16 March 2004, when he was named as a substitute for a First Division match against Walsall, but he remained unused. Barron made his first team debut against Brentford in a 2–0 League Cup first round win in August 2004 and played the full 90 minutes. He was an unused substitute on another six occasions, but a persistent groin injury and surgery required on a double hernia meant that he missed much of the 2004–05 season.

Barron's injury problems continued into the 2005–06 season and he had to wait until December 2005 for his next appearance, when he replaced Darren Currie after 87 minutes of a 1–1 Championship draw with Wolverhampton Wanderers. Despite a lingering hamstring problem, Barron made a run of 15 first team appearances during the second half of the season and to total 16 for the campaign. Having entered the final months of his existing contract, Barron signed a two-year extension in March 2006.

Barron was only called into the Ipswich Town squad once during the 2006–07 season and made three appearances away on loan at League Two club Wrexham during the second half of the season. Barron was released by Ipswich Town in June 2007 and he made 17 appearances for the club during his three years as a professional at Portman Road.

=== Millwall ===
Barron joined League One club Millwall on a free transfer in June 2007. Playing under manager Willie Donachie (previously a coach at Ipswich Town), Barron fell out of favour after Donachie was replaced by Kenny Jackett early in the season. He made 17 appearances during the 2007–08 season, as Millwall narrowly avoided relegation to League Two. Barron made 16 appearances in 2008–09 and scored the first senior goal of his career in an FA Cup third round replay against Crewe Alexandra on 13 January 2009. He was an unused substitute during Millwall's unsuccessful playoff campaign. In the 2009–10 season Barron made 29 appearances and won the first medal of his career when Millwall were promoted to the Championship after running out 1–0 victors against Swindon Town in the 2010 League One playoff final.

Barron had a successful 2010–11 season in the Championship, making 42 appearances in a variety of positions and scoring two goals as Millwall finished 9th. His injury niggles returned during 2011–12 season and he played the latter part of the campaign while suffering from a recurring knee problem. He made 28 appearances during the 2011–12 season and was told he was free to leave the Lions at the end of the campaign. Barron made 132 appearances and scored three goals during his five years at The Den.

=== Brentford ===
Barron joined League One club Brentford on a two-year contract on 13 August 2012. He made 17 appearances during his debut season with the Bees, before undergoing surgery on a hip joint problem in March 2013. Hip and groin injuries restricted Barron to just five appearances during the 2013–14 season. He was released in June 2014, after making just 22 appearances during his two years at Griffin Park.

=== Retirement ===
In August 2014, Barron revealed he had retired from football, due to the long-standing hip-joint problem that he initially suffered during a Football League Trophy match versus Southend United on 4 December 2012.

== Personal life ==
Following his retirement, Barron joined Refuel Performance Management and continues to work alongside former Brentford teammate Richard Lee.

== Career statistics ==
Appearances and goals by club, season and competition
Club	Season	League			FA Cup		League Cup		Other		Total	
Club	Season	Division	Apps	Goals	Apps	Goals	Apps	Goals	Apps	Goals	Apps	Goals
Ipswich Town	2003–04	First Division	0	0	0	0	0	0	0	0	0	0
Ipswich Town	2004–05	Championship	0	0	0	0	1	0	0	0	1	0
Ipswich Town	2005–06	Championship	15	0	0	0	1	0	—		16	0
Ipswich Town	2006–07	Championship	0	0	0	0	0	0	—		0	0
Ipswich Town	Total		15	0	0	0	2	0	—		17	0
Wrexham (loan)	2006–07	League Two	3	0	—		—		—		3	0
Millwall	2007–08	League One	12	0	3	0	1	0	1 (Note: Appearance(s) in Football League Trophy)	0	17	0
Millwall	2008–09	League One	14	0	2	1	0	0	0	0	16	1
Millwall	2009–10	League One	23	0	1	0	2	0	3 (Note: Appearances in League One play-offs)	0	29	0
Millwall	2010–11	Championship	38	2	1	0	3	0	—		42	2
Millwall	2011–12	Championship	20	0	5	0	3	0	—		28	0
Millwall	Total		107	2	12	1	9	0	4	0	132	3
Brentford	2012–13	League One	12	0	3	0	0	0	2	0	17	0
Brentford	2013–14	League One	2	0	0	0	2	0	1	0	5	0
Brentford	Total		14	0	3	0	2	0	3	0	22	0
Career total			139	2	15	1	13	0	7	0	174	3

== Honours ==
Millwall

- Football League One play-offs: 2010
