= Danny Senda =

English footballer (born 1981)

Personal information
- Full name: Daniel Luke Senda
- Date of birth: 17 April 1981 (age 45)
- Place of birth: Harrow, England
- Height: 5 ft 11 in (1.80 m)
- Position: Defender

Youth career
- 1997–1999: Southampton

Senior career*
Years	Team	Apps	(Gls)
1999–2006	Wycombe Wanderers	316	(9)
2006–2009	Millwall	86	(1)
2010–2011	Torquay United	2	(0)
2011	Bristol Rovers	16	(0)
2011–2012	Barnet	19	(0)
Total		439	(10)
- * Club domestic league appearances and goals

Daniel Luke Senda (born 17 April 1981 in Harrow, Greater London) is an English retired professional football defender and former assistant head coach at Leyton Orient.

== Playing career ==
Senda started his career as an apprentice with Southampton. He joined Wycombe Wanderers as a striker during the 1998–99 season, and made his Wycombe debut as a substitute during the home game with Oldham Athletic in March 1999, although he had to wait until January 2000 for his full debut. He scored his first goal at first team level during the 3–1 victory at Wrexham the following month. He was subsequently converted to a right wing back role by Lawrie Sanchez and became a first team regular.

The arrival of Tony Adams as Wycombe boss in November 2003 saw the player eventually preferred in a right midfield position and impressed enough to be awarded a new two-year contract in April 2004.

With the arrival of John Gorman in November 2004, Senda was employed as a right full back and enjoyed much success working on the right flank with Winger, Kevin Betsy. Senda was then out of contract with Wycombe Wanderers and had been due to sign for Luton Town but that deal failed to materialise. Senda publicly criticised his agent claiming his agent wanted 'too much' from the deal. Senda subsequently sacked his agent.

He also had trials with Leeds United and Wolverhampton Wanderers before finally completing a deadline-day deal with Millwall on 31 August 2006.

Senda was injured in the final game of the season on 3 May 2008 against Swindon at The County Ground, a game in which he also scored his only goal for the club. In a brief interview with the South London Press, Senda thanked the Swindon fans for applauding him off the pitch and Lions supporters and players for their support since the injury stating: "It was quite humbling." He spent 16 months on the sidelines before his contract expired at the end of the 2008–09 season. He was then offered a one-month contract on 27 July 2009 to prove his fitness.

He signed for Torquay United on 16 September 2010 after playing reserve team games against Exeter City and Forest Green Rovers.

Senda signed for Bristol Rovers as a free agent on 18 February 2011 after leaving Torquay on 16 December 2010. He was one of seventeen players released by the team in May 2011.

=== Barnet ===
Senda signed a one-year deal for Barnet on 26 July 2011. On his debut, away to Morecambe, he was part of a defence that kept a clean sheet in a 1–0 win.

On 10 January 2012, against Swindon Town in the Football League Trophy Area Final First Leg, Senda sustained a dislocated kneecap after falling awkwardly and it was announced that he would be out of the rest of the season.

Senda's contract expired at the end of the 2011–12 season, but he continued to train with Barnet into the 2012–13 season as part of his recovery from the serious injury sustained in January. He played one game for Barnet's reserve team early in the season, but announced his retirement on Twitter in February 2013 due to injury.

== Coaching career ==
Senda joined Brentford as an academy coach in September 2013. He became head coach of Barnet's under-18 team in summer 2017. Senda was promoted to first team coach in February 2019. He left the Bees in July 2020. He was hired as assistant head coach for Leyton Orient on 14 July 2020 and left on 11 June 2021.

On 17 May 2023 Senda joined Charlton Athletic as joint first-team assistant manager.

On 8 January 2024, The Football Association suspended Senda from all football and football-related activity for four years after he admitted to charges of misconduct raised by two complainants. Senda was found to have engaged in behaviour that was "improper and/or indecent and/or insulting contrary to FA Rule E3.1." while on a course in June 2023.

== Honours ==
Individual

- PFA Team of the Year: 2005–06 Football League Two
