= Ali Fuseini =

Ghanaian semi-professional footballer (born 1988)

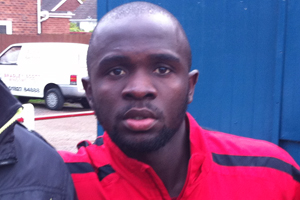

Personal information
- Full name: Ali Fuseini
- Date of birth: 7 December 1988 (age 37)
- Place of birth: Accra, Ghana
- Height: 1.75 m (5 ft 9 in)
- Position: Defensive midfielder

Senior career*
| Years | Team | Apps | (Gls) |
| 2006–2010 | Millwall | 76 | (2) |
| 2010 | Lewes | 1 | (0) |
| 2010–2011 | Lincoln City | 51 | (2) |
| 2011 | Eastleigh | 1 | (0) |
| 2012–2013 | Bromley | 49 | (6) |
| 2013–2014 | Sutton United | 29 | (0) |
| 2014–2016 | Bromley | 86 | (7) |
| 2016 | Margate | 7 | (0) |
| 2016–2017 | Welling United | 31 | (0) |
| 2017–2018 | Greenwich Borough | | |
| 2018- | VCD Athletic | | |
- * Club domestic league appearances and goals as of 01:45, 23 January 2017 (UTC)

Ali Fuseini (born 7 December 1988) is a Ghanaian former professional footballer who played as a defensive midfielder.

== Career ==
=== Millwall ===
He joined Millwall from Sunday league football and made his first-team debut against Gillingham on 12 September 2006. Although he was an unused sub on that occasion, he since went on to make several more appearances for the first team.

Fuseini discovered he had a talent for football while at school, and was soon playing in midfield for Sunday league team Dulmore Albion, based in Brockley Rise. It was there he was seen by Millwall scout Jamie Martin, who signed him up for a scholarship aged 16. Fuseini tore a medial knee ligament in his first season as an under-18, and missed almost two months of football.

A senior appearance for Millwall in the pre-season friendly at Crawley Town on 15 August followed, with Fuseini earning praise from then-manager Nigel Spackman, who watched the game. He then played the first three reserve games of the season, scoring against Wycombe Wanderers. Millwall's opening few results went badly, so Spackman called up Fuseini to the Millwall first team squad.

In the 2007–08 season, Fuseini scored his first goal for the Lions, in a 2–1 defeat at Bristol Rovers. However, after Millwall signed midfielder Jimmy Abdou, Fuseini was mainly used as a substitute. Fuseini was part of the Millwall squad which got to the playoff final during the 2008–09 season after beating Leeds United in the playoff semi-finals, Millwall went on to lose against Scunthorpe United. The following season, Fuseini played a bit part role in the Millwall squad got promoted at the end of the 2009–10 season after beating Swindon Town in the play-off final. But after gaining promotion to the Championship, Fuseini's contract wasn't renewed by Millwall. Shortly after leaving Millwall, he had a short trial with Leeds United. On 23 July, he played as a trialist for Crystal Palace against Exeter City, starting the game in central midfield before switching to left back in the second. On 4 August, Sky Sports reported that Leeds were considering offering Fuseini a contract.

In September 2010, he joined Leyton Orient on trial, appearing four times for the reserve team in the course of a month-long trial.

=== Lincoln City ===
On 31 January 2011, he signed for League Two club Lincoln City, agreeing a deal until the summer of 2012. In May 2011 he was made available for transfer by the club after a mass clear out of players following relegation from the Football League.

Having been ever present throughout the 2011–12 season until the dismissal of Steve Tilson, Fuseini found himself dropped to the bench for caretaker manager Grant Brown's first game in charge, a 3–1 victory at Alfreton Town on 11 October 2011. Under new Imps manager David Holdsworth he failed to match the matchday squad and, on 11 November 2011, was one of three players made available for loan with immediate effect. However, no move materialised and on 25 November 2011 he left Sincil Bank by mutual consent.

=== Eastleigh ===
On 1 December 2011, he joined Eastleigh. He was released almost immediately after joining the club on a trial basis for failing to appear at the Eastleigh vs Thurrock game on 10 December 2011. Fuseini missed the game as a result of a 10-week prison sentence for two counts of Driving while Disqualified.

=== Bromley ===
On 20 January 2012, he signed for Bromley, making his debut in the 1–1 draw at home to Truro City on 21 January. On 16 March 2012, he signed a new deal with the club, keeping him there until the end of the 2012–13 season. He scored his first goal for the club on 31 March 2012, in their 1–0 win at home to Weston-Super-Mare, controlling a cross, flicking the ball over a defender and finishing calmly. Despite being a defensive midfielder, he has been known for his attacking threat since arriving at Bromley. He was made team captain shortly after joining the club. He scored his second goal in a 3–1 away defeat to Welling United, which was followed by another goal against Farnborough. He then scored his fourth Bromley goal in the 3–1 home victory over his former club Eastleigh on 5 January 2013. On 23 February 2013, he scored Bromley's first in their 3–2 away win over Billericay Town. He scored Bromley's quickest goal of the season in a 4–0 home win over Truro City on 9 March 2013 – it was after just 24 seconds of the match.

=== Sutton United ===
On 28 March 2013, Fuseini left Bromley after failing to reach an agreement over a new deal. He then joined Sutton United. During his time at Sutton, Fuseini scored two goals, both of which were against Hemel Hempstead Town. In the only game he played against Bromley, he was named man of the match. In January 2014, Fuseini left Sutton and immediately returned to Bromley.

=== Return to Bromley ===
Fuseini was named in the squad for the 2–1 home defeat to Concord Rangers on 14 January 2014, but was an unused substitute. He started Bromley's next game – a 2–1 away win against Bath City. His first goal back at the club came in the 2014–15 season opener, in a 3–1 away win against Havant & Waterlooville.

=== Welling United ===
Fuseini joined National League South Welling United on 2 September 2016, and made his debut the following day in a 5–0 victory for his new team over Concord Rangers. In August 2017 he moved on to join Greenwich Borough, before linking up with VCD Athletic a year later.

== Personal life ==
Fuseini was born and brought up in Accra, the capital of Ghana, but followed his mother, Mariam, a nurse, to Catford in 2000. He was educated at St Joseph's Academy, Blackheath.

== Honours ==
Millwall

- Football League One play-offs: 2010
