= Andy Frampton =

English footballer (born 1979)

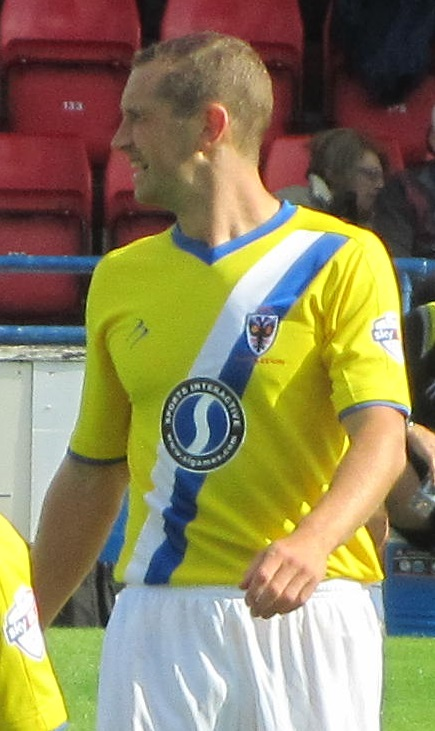
- Frampton playing for AFC Wimbledon in 2013

Personal information
- Full name: Andrew James Kerr Frampton
- Date of birth: 3 September 1979 (age 47)
- Place of birth: Wimbledon, England
- Height: 5 ft 11 in (1.80 m)
- Position: Defender

Youth career
- 1991–1998: Crystal Palace

Senior career*
Years	Team	Apps	(Gls)
1998–2002	Crystal Palace	29	(0)
2002–2007	Brentford	138	(5)
2007–2011	Millwall	88	(4)
2010	→ Leyton Orient (loan)	1	(0)
2010–2011	→ Swindon Town (loan)	23	(0)
2011–2013	Gillingham	58	(0)
2013–2015	AFC Wimbledon	35	(4)
Total		372	(13)
- * Club domestic league appearances and goals

Andrew James Kerr Frampton (born 3 September 1979) is an English former professional footballer who played as a central defender.

Frampton joined the youth academy of Crystal Palace at the age of 11, progressing through the ranks before making his senior league debut for the club on 3 April 1999 at the age of 19 years, 213 days. He spent four seasons with the Football League First Division side before joining Brentford on a free transfer in October 2002. He would go on to make 138 league appearances for "The Bees" in a five-year spell with the club.

== Early life ==
Frampton was born in Wimbledon, London and brought up in nearby Purley before being scouted and signed at the age of 11 by the youth Academy of Football League First Division side Crystal Palace whilst he was playing for the Croydon Schools FA. He was later educated at Lancing College. He proved himself to be a gifted athlete and was chosen to represent the school in the 1996–97 Boodle & Dunthorne Independent Schools Football Association Cup Final, which eventually saw his side triumph 2–1 over Bolton School.

== Club career ==
=== Crystal Palace ===
Frampton progressed through the youth system at Crystal Palace before breaking into the first team and making his Football League debut at the age of 19 on 3 April 1999 in a 1–0 win over Norwich City at Carrow Road. He went on to make five more appearances for the club during the 1998–99 season, with the club ultimately finishing 14th in the league. During the 1999–2000 season he made 10 league appearances, including a 4–0 win over Portsmouth on 2 October 1999, with the club once again ending the season having achieved a mid–table league ranking of 15th. The 21-year–old defender made another ten league appearances in the 2000–2001 season. Crystal Palace struggled throughout the season however and only prevented relegation to the Second Division on the final day, beating Stockport County 1–0 on 6 May 2001. Frampton found his first-team opportunities limited during the 2001–02, playing just two matches in April 2002, as he proved unable to compete with Craig Harrison as first choice left-back. The defender made two appearances for Crystal Palace during the 2002–03 season, however, having failed to cement his place in the first-team, Frampton subsequently joined Football League Second Division club Brentford on a free transfer on 28 October 2002.

=== Brentford ===
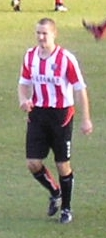
Frampton playing for Brentford in January 2006.

Frampton made his debut for the Bees in a 0–0 draw with Plymouth Argyle on 29 October 2002, coming on as a 71st minute substitute for Jamie Fullarton. He would go on to make a further 14 league appearances for the Bees in the 2002–03 season, including a 5–0 win over Blackpool on 2 November 2002. He was appointed Brentford's vice–captain for the 2006–07 season and signed a new three-year contract in September 2006.

=== Millwall ===
On 27 June 2007, Frampton joined Millwall for an undisclosed fee. His Millwall career began slowly, with a number of defensive mistakes drawing criticism from the Millwall faithful in his first season. But he won over the Millwall supporters with a series of strong, gutsy displays, culminating in him winning the supporters' player of the year award for the 2008–09 season. Frampton left Millwall in the summer of 2011 after spending much of the season on loan at Swindon Town.

=== Gillingham ===
He joined Gillingham in July 2011 and he was soon appointed the new team captain replacing Barry Fuller. He made his debut for Gillingham in the 1–0 win over Cheltenham Town on 6 August helping produce a clean sheet in his first game.

=== AFC Wimbledon ===
On 28 June 2013, Frampton joined Football League Two side AFC Wimbledon on a two–year deal after turning down the offer of a one-year contract extension with Gillingham.

== Honours ==
Millwall

- Football League One play-offs: 2010

Gillingham

- Football League Two: 2012–13

Individual

- Brentford Most Improved Player of the Year: 2005–06
- Millwall Player of the Season: 2008–09
