= 2017 EFL League One play-off final =

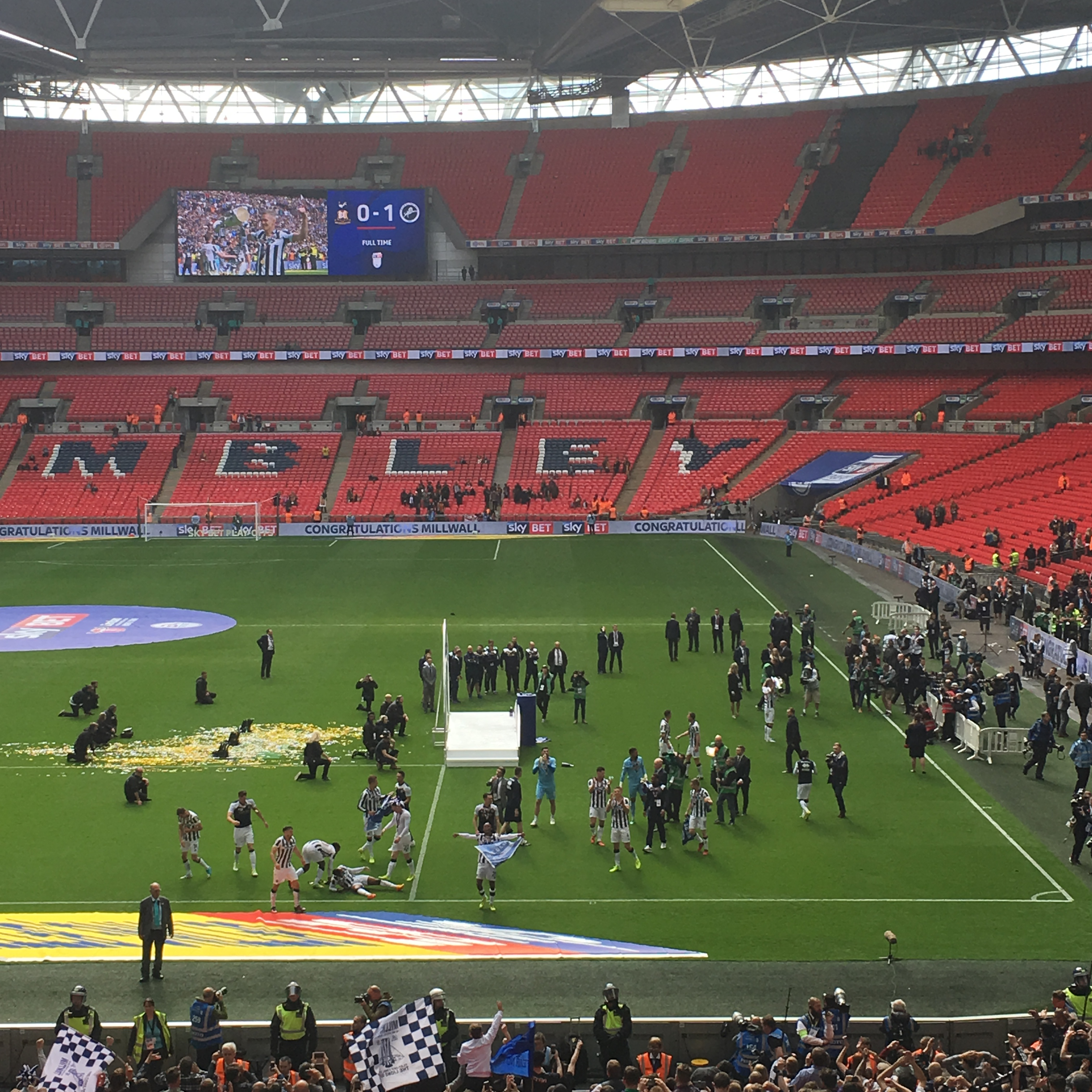
- Millwall players celebrate promotion
Bradford City	Millwall
0	1
- Date: 20 May 2017
- Venue: Wembley Stadium, London
- Referee: Simon Hooper (Wiltshire)
- Attendance: 53,320

The 2017 EFL League One play-off final was an association football match which was played on 20 May 2017 at Wembley Stadium, London, between Bradford City and Millwall to determine the third and final team to gain promotion from EFL League One to the EFL Championship. The top two teams of the 2016–17 EFL League One season gained automatic promotion to the Championship, while the teams placed from third to sixth place in the table partook in play-off semi-finals; the winners of these semi-finals competed for the final place for the 2017–18 season in the Championship.

Bradford had won two play-off finals going into the match, while Millwall had won one and lost two, including the previous season's final. Going into the match, Millwall had spent two years in the third tier of English football while Bradford City had not played in the second tier for thirteen seasons. A Wembley crowd of more than 53,000 people watched a goalless first half, but Millwall's Steve Morison scored the game's only goal late in the second half to ensure his club's return to the Championship.

After the match had ended, several people invaded the Wembley pitch for the first time since the new stadium had been used. The actions of these individuals were widely condemned and a number of arrests were made. Millwall ended the following season in eighth position in the EFL Championship, while Bradford City finished 11th in League One, eight points below the play-off positions.

== Route to the final ==
Football League One final table, leading positions
Pos	Team	Pld	W	D	L	GF	GA	GD	Pts
1	Sheffield United	46	30	10	6	92	47	+45	100
2	Bolton Wanderers	46	25	11	10	68	36	+32	86
3	Scunthorpe United	46	24	10	12	80	54	+26	82
4	Fleetwood Town	46	23	13	10	64	43	+21	82
5	Bradford City	46	20	19	7	62	43	+19	79
6	Millwall	46	20	13	13	66	57	+9	73

Bradford City finished the regular 2016–17 season in fifth place in EFL League One, the third tier of the English football league system, one place ahead of Millwall. Both therefore missed out on the two automatic places for promotion to the EFL Championship and instead took part in the play-offs to determine the third promoted team. Bradford City finished seven points behind Bolton Wanderers (who were promoted in second place) and twenty-one behind league winners Sheffield United. Millwall ended the season six points behind Bradford City.

Millwall's play-off semi-final opponents were Scunthorpe United, with the first leg being played at home at The Den. Five players were booked but with few chances, the match ended goalless. The second leg, played three days later at Scunthorpe's ground Glanford Park. The home team took an early lead through Ivan Toney before Steve Morison levelled the match. Morison then set up Lee Gregory who scored Millwall's second on the stroke of half-time. Thirteen minutes into the second half, Morison scored his second and Millwall's third, and despite a consolation goal from Stephen Dawson, the match and the tie ended 3–2.

Bradford City faced Fleetwood Town in their play-off semi-final, playing the first leg at home at Valley Parade. The game was dominated by Bradford but they had to wait until 13 minutes remaining to break the deadlock, with Rory McArdle's headed goal from a Tony McMahon cross. The return leg was played at Fleetwood's Highbury Stadium three days later, and ended goalless, meaning Bradford City won the tie 1–0 on aggregate.

Millwall			Round	Bradford City
Opponent	Result	Legs	Semi-finals	Opponent	Result	Legs
Scunthorpe United	3–2	0–0 home; 3–2 away		Fleetwood Town	1–0	1–0 home; 0–0 away

== Match ==
=== Background ===
Millwall had featured in three play-off finals prior to this game. They lost the 2009 Football League One play-off final 3–2 to Scunthorpe United but triumphed the following season in the 2010 Football League One play-off final defeating Swindon Town 1–0. Millwall also lost the previous season's final 3–1 to Barnsley. They had played at Wembley in the 2012–13 FA Cup semi-final, losing to Wigan Athletic. Bradford City played in the 1996 Football League Second Division play-off final at the old Wembley Stadium, beating Notts County 2–0. They had also appeared at Wembley: in 2013 they won the League Two play-off final 3–0 against Northampton Town but lost 5–0 to Swansea City in the 2013 Football League Cup Final. During the regular 2016–17 season, both fixtures between the clubs had ended in 1–1 draws. Gregory was Millwall's highest scorer with seventeen goals, while Jordy Hiwula was Bradford's top marksman with nine. Bradford were attempting to restore their Championship status which they had lost 13 years prior, having been relegated from the 2003–04 Football League First Division. Millwall last played in the Championship during the 2014–15 season when they were relegated to League One after finishing in 22nd position.

Simon Hooper representing the Wiltshire Football Association was the referee for the match, with assistants Nick Hopton and Neil Davies, and Chris Kavanagh acted as the fourth official. Bradford City were allocated 38,000 tickets for the game, while Millwall received 37,623. Both teams wore their traditional home kit with Bradford in claret and amber while Millwall wore blue and white. The two starting line-ups were unchanged from their respective semi-final second legs, although Bradford's Alex Jones returned to the bench. The match was broadcast live in the UK on Sky Sports. Bookmakers predicted a close match with no clear favourite to win.

=== First half ===
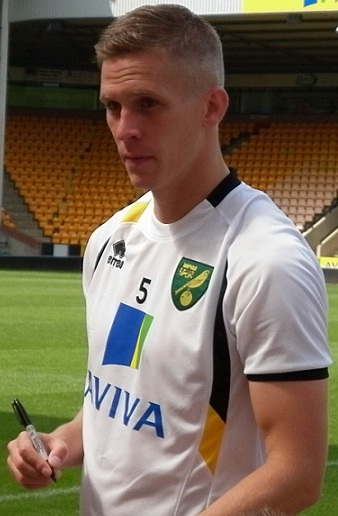
Steve Morison (pictured in 2012) scored the only goal of the game.

Millwall kicked the game off around 3 p.m. in front of a Wembley crowd of 53,320. Two minutes into the match Gregory was fouled by Romain Vincelot, but Shaun Williams' free kick was blocked. Mark Marshall's cross was then cleared but fell to teammate McMahon whose shot was wide from 20 yards (18 m). Nathaniel Knight-Percival then conceded a corner from which Shaun Hutchinson's deflected header went over Bradford City's crossbar. A minute later, Morison beat McCardle but his header was wide. On 13 minutes, Billy Clarke received the ball from Marshall but his shot was tipped past the Millwall post by their goalkeeper Jordan Archer. Two minutes later, Archer saved once again, this time from a James Meredith shot. In the 31st minute, McCardle's header from a McMahon cross was saved by Archer. Aiden O'Brien was fouled by McMahon in the 39th minute and the resulting free kick was headed across the area by Morison. The ball reached Hutchinson whose shot was blocked by McCardle. Three minutes later, Marshall was fouled and Charlie Wyke's header from the free kick went wide. After one minute of additional time, the goalless half was brought to a close.

=== Second half ===
With no changes to either team during the break, Bradford got the second half under way. On 50 minutes, Meredith's shot was blocked by Millwall defenders on the six-yard line. Two minutes later, Gregory's header was struck first time by Morison but his shot went wide. O'Brien became the first player to be booked after fouling Marshall on 58 minutes. McMahon's resulting free kick was then headed over from 6 yards (5.5 m) by McArdle. Two minutes later Gregory's pass sent Jed Wallace in on goal but he dragged his shot wide. In the 65th minute, another McMahon free kick was headed over the Millwall crossbar by McArdle. With 20 minutes of the match remaining, Millwall made the first substitution of the game with Shane Ferguson replacing O'Brien. Four minutes later, Bradford made a double change, with Jones and Timothée Dieng replacing Clarke and Nicky Law. Meredith was shown a yellow card in the 76th minute for a foul on Wallace, before another chance for Morison was blocked by McCardle. Meredith then headed wide of Millwall's goal from a McMahon cross. With five minutes remaining, Williams intercepted a Marshall pass and crossed the ball. Gregory headed it across goal for Morison to volley the ball into the Bradford City goal from 6 yards (5.5 m), for Millwall to take the lead. Fred Onyedinma then replaced Wallace in the 89th minute and Gregory was substituted off for Calum Butcher soon after. In the last minute of five minutes of additional time, McMahon's shot hit the side netting. The final whistle was blown and the match ended 1–0 to Millwall.

=== Details ===
20 May 2017
15:00

Bradford City	0–1	Millwall
	Report	Morison 85'

Wembley Stadium, London
Attendance: 53,320
Referee: Simon Hooper

Bradford City	Millwall

1	Colin Doyle
29	Tony McMahon
23	Rory McArdle
22	Nathaniel Knight-Percival
3	James Meredith (yellow card) 76'
7	Mark Marshall
14	Josh Cullen
6	Romain Vincelot (c)
4	Nicky Law (substituted off) 74'
10	Billy Clarke (substituted off) 74'
9	Charlie Wyke
Substitutes:
13	Rouven Sattelmaier
2	Stephen Darby
26	Matthew Kilgallon
8	Timothée Dieng (substituted on) 74'
11	Jordy Hiwula
18	Alex Gilliead
19	Alex Jones (substituted on) 74'
Manager:
Stuart McCall

1	Jordan Archer
12	Mahlon Romeo
4	Shaun Hutchinson
17	Byron Webster
5	Tony Craig (c)
14	Jed Wallace (substituted off) 89'
26	Jimmy Abdou
6	Shaun Williams
22	Aiden O'Brien (yellow card) 58' (substituted off) 70'
9	Lee Gregory (substituted off) 90+1'
20	Steve Morison 85'
Substitutes:
31	Tom King
24	Jake Cooper
7	David Worrall
8	Ben Thompson
10	Fred Onyedinma (substituted on) 89'
16	Calum Butcher (substituted on) 90+1'
18	Shane Ferguson (substituted on) 70'
Manager:
Neil Harris

=== Statistics ===
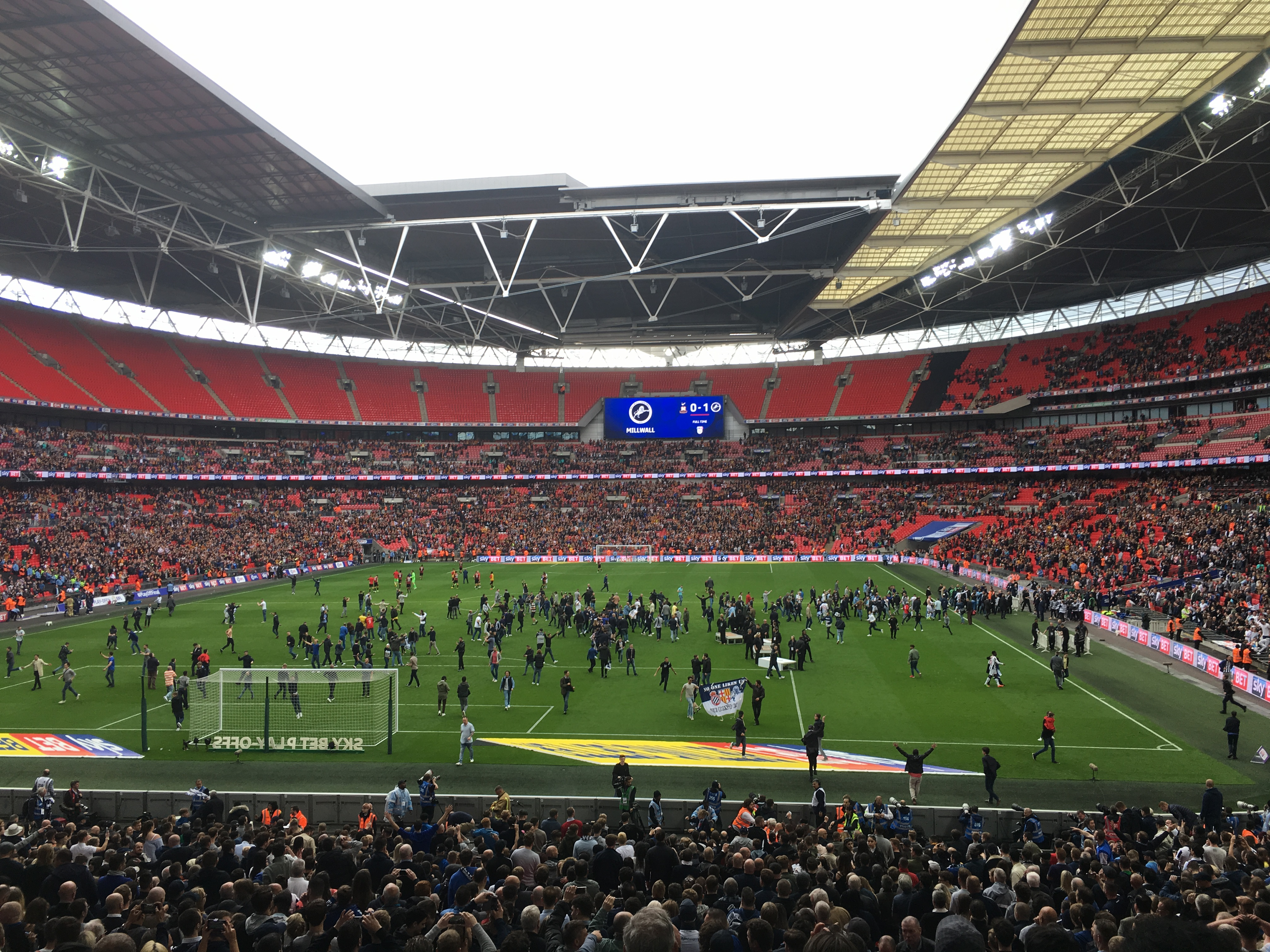
The first pitch invasion at the new Wembley Stadium by Millwall fans, May 2017

Statistics
	Bradford	Millwall
Possession	61%	39%
Goals scored	0	1
Shots on target	3	2
Shots off target	15	12
Fouls committed	14	22
Corner kicks	5	14
Yellow cards	1	1
Red cards	0	0

== Post-match ==
At the end of the game Millwall fans invaded the pitch confronting Bradford City manager, Stuart McCall, who said: "Wembley have to learn from this. Everyone in the place knew they were coming on. I was close to clocking a couple." The Metropolitan Police made 12 arrests. After the game, supporters of both clubs were seen fighting and throwing traffic cones. A spokesman for the English Football League called the invasion "completely unacceptable". Morison said: "The fans have ruined it for me at the moment. I can't celebrate." His manager, Neil Harris said: "The strikers have been the difference for us over the play-offs. Bradford were better than us in the first half but I took a step back and put trust in my players." McCall noted: "We knew it would be tight and that one goal might do it. It's sore to take but congratulations to Millwall. Jordan Archer made a superb save and that is the thin line between failure and success."

Millwall ended the following season in eighth position in the EFL Championship, three points outside the play-offs. Bradford City's finished 11th in their next season, eight points below the play-off positions.
