= 2011–12 Millwall F.C. season =

Millwall
2011–12 season
- Chairman: John Berylson
- Manager: Kenny Jackett
- Championship: 16th
- FA Cup: Fifth round
- League Cup: Third round
- Top goalscorer: League: Darius Henderson (15); All: Darius Henderson (19)
- Highest home attendance: 16,085 v Crystal Palace (31 December 2011)
- Lowest home attendance: League: 9,062 v Doncaster Rovers (29 November 2011); All: 3,443 v Morecambe (24 August 2011)
- Average home league attendance: 11,486
Home colours	Away colours

The 2011–12 Football League Championship was Millwall's 127th season in existence, 86th season in the Football League and 37th in the second tier of English football. It is Millwall's second continuous season in the Championship, after promotion from League One in 2010. This season marks manager Kenny Jackett's fourth full season in charge of the club.

== Season review ==
=== Results summary ===
Overall								Home						Away					
Pld	W	D	L	GF	GA	GD	Pts	W	D	L	GF	GA	GD	W	D	L	GF	GA	GD
46	15	12	19	57	75	−18	57	7	7	9	27	30	−3	8	5	10	30	45	−15

Last updated: 28 April 2012.
Source: The Football League

=== Result round by round ===
Round	1	2	3	4	5	6	7	8	9	10	11	12	13	14	15	16	17	18	19	20	21	22	23	24	25	26	27	28	29	30	31	32	33	34	35	36	37	38	39	40	41	42	43	44	45	46
Ground	A	H	H	A	H	A	H	A	A	H	A	H	A	H	H	A	H	A	H	A	H	A	H	H	A	H	A	H	A	H	A	H	A	H	A	A	H	A	H	A	H	A	H	A	A	H
Result	D	W	D	L	D	L	D	L	L	L	D	D	W	W	W	L	L	D	W	L	D	L	W	L	L	L	W	L	L	D	D	L	W	L	W	L	L	W	L	D	W	W	W	W	W	D
Position	11	4	9	10	11	15	15	20	22	23	21	22	20	16	15	16	18	21	17	19	19	20	20	21	21	21	20	21	21	20	20	19	19	19	19	19	19	19	19	19	19	18	17	17	16	16

Updated to match(es) played on 29 April 2012. Source: The Football League
A = Away; H = Home; W = Win; D = Draw; L = Loss

== Matches ==
=== Pre-season ===
11 July 2011	Shelbourne	0–3	Millwall	Tolka Park
20:00		Report	Marquis 13'; McQuoid 30', 40'	Attendance: 370

13 July 2011	Longford Town	0–1	Millwall	Flancare Park
19:30		Report	Mkandawire 53'

19 July 2011	Dartford	0–5	Millwall	Princes Park
19:45		Report	Henry 10', 40', 63'; Henderson 17'; McQuoid 83'

23 July 2011	Gillingham	0–1	Millwall	Priestfield Stadium
13:00		Report	Henderson 49'; Marquis 90'

30 July 2011	Millwall	4–3	Charlton Athletic	The Den
15:00	Henry 14'; Marquis 26', 29'; Bouazza 77'	Report	Wright-Phillips 5', 15'; Jackson 55'	Attendance: 6,202; Referee: Anthony Bates

=== The Championship ===
6 August 2011 1	Reading	2–2	Millwall	Madejski Stadium
15:00	Manset 85', 88'	Report	Henderson 49'; Marquis 61'	Attendance: 18,531; Referee: Anthony Bates

13 August 2011 2	Millwall	2–0	Nottingham Forest	The Den
15:00	Henderson 7'; Trotter 77'	Report		Attendance: 12,010; Referee: G. Scott

17 August 2011 3	Millwall	2–2	Peterborough United	The Den
19:45	Trotter 32'; Bouazza 55'	Report	Frecklington 72'; Taylor 75'	Attendance: 10,240; Referee: Neil Swarbrick

20 August 2011 4	Southampton	1–0	Millwall	St Mary's Stadium
15:00	Guly 18'			Attendance: 23,333

27 August 2011 5	Millwall	0–0	Barnsley	The Den
15:00		Report		Attendance: 10,033; Referee: Coote

11 September 2011 6	Birmingham City	3–0	Millwall	St Andrew's
12:30	Wood 29', 62', 90'			Attendance: 17,901

17 September 2011 7	Millwall	0–0	West Ham United	The Den
12:30		Report		Attendance: 16,078

24 September 2011 8	Derby County	3–0	Millwall	Pride Park Stadium
15:00	Bryson 24'; Hendrick 39'; S Davies 65'	report		Attendance: 24,120

27 September 2011 9	Watford	2–1	Millwall	Vicarage Road
19:45	Dickinson 78'; Forsyth 85'	report	Feeney 68'	Attendance: 10,592

1 October 2011 10	Millwall	0–1	Burnley	The Den
15:00		report	Rodriquez 37'	Attendance: 10,460

15 October 2011 11	Middlesbrough	1–1	Millwall	Riverside Stadium
15:00	Robson 24'	report	Trotter 55'	Attendance: 16,669

18 October 2011 12	Millwall	1–1	Brighton & Hove Albion	The Den
19:45	Simpson 81'	report	Noone 61'	Attendance: 11,688

22 October 2011 13	Leicester City	0–3	Millwall	King Power Stadium
15:00		report	Henderson 36' (pen.), 45+3', 68'	Attendance: 21,991

29 October 2011 14	Millwall	4–1	Ipswich Town	The Den
15:00	Simposon 6', 75'; Henderson 9'; Feeney 73'	report	Bullard 66'	Attendance: 12,464

1 November 2011 15	Millwall	3–0	Coventry City	The Den
19:45	Henderson 53', 69'; Feeney 82'	report		Attendance: 9,517

5 November 2011 16	Blackpool	1–0	Millwall	Bloomfield Road
15:00	K Phillips 61'	report		Attendance: 12,455

20 November 2011 17	Millwall	1–2	Bristol City	The Den
13:15	Simpson 57'	report	Maynard 14', 64'	Attendance: 10,252

26 November 2011 18	Crystal Palace	0–0	Millwall	Selhurst Park
15:00		report		Attendance: 15,150

29 November 2011 19	Millwall	3–2	Doncaster Rovers	The Den
13:15	Trotter 25' (pen.), 42'; Henderson 84'	report	Sharp 40' (pen.), 86'	Attendance: 9,062

3 December 2011 20	Leeds United	2–0	Millwall	Elland Road
12:30	Snodgras 62', 65'	report		Attendance: 27,161

10 December 2011 21	Millwall	0–0	Cardiff City	The Den
15:00		[ report]		Attendance: 11,314

17 December 2011 22	Hull City	2–0	Millwall	KC Stadium
13:15	Smith 54' (o.g.); Koren 80'	[ report]		Attendance: 17,841

26 December 2011 23	Millwall	1–0	Portsmouth	The Den
13:00	N'Guessan 82'	[ report]		Attendance: 11,002

31 December 2011 24	Millwall	0–1	Crystal Palace	The Den
13:00		report	Easter 23'	Attendance: 16,085

2 January 2012 25	Bristol City	1–0	Millwall	Ashton Gate Stadium
15:00	Maynard 90+3'	report		Attendance: 12,410

14 January 2012 26	Millwall	0–6	Birmingham City	The Den
15:00	Lowry (red card) 22'; Dunne (red card) 57'	report	Davies 18'; King 59', 83'; Burke 74'; Redmond 90+2'	Attendance: 10,539

21 January 2012 27	Barnsley	1–3	Millwall	Oakwell
15:00	McNulty 88'	report	Henderson 36' (pen.), 39', 75'	Attendance: 9,185

31 January 2012 28	Millwall	0–2	Watford	The Den
19:45		report	Deeney 35'; Garner 59'	Attendance: 9,294

4 February 2012 29	West Ham United	2–1	Millwall	Boleyn Ground
15:00	Cole 45'; Reid 69'	report		Attendance: 27,774

11 February 2012 30	Millwall	0–0	Derby County	The Den
15:00		report		Attendance: 10,069

14 February 2012 31	Brighton & Hove Albion	2–2	Millwall	Falmer Stadium
19:45	Vokes 52'; LuaLua 88'	report	Keogh 23'; Feeney 64'	Attendance: 19,503

21 February 2012 32	Millwall	1–3	Middlesbrough	The Den
19:45	Henderson 43'	report	Emnes 15', 38'; Main 86'	Attendance: 9,286

25 February 2012 33	Burnley	1–3	Millwall	Turf Moor
15:00	Rodriguez 90' (pen.)	report	Keogh 15'; Wright 30'; Kane 57'	Attendance: 13,000

3 March 2012 34	Millwall	1–2	Reading	The Den
15:00	Keogh 16'	report	Robson-Kanu 45'; Le Fondre 76'	Attendance: 11,271

7 March 2012 35	Peterborough United	0–3	Millwall	London Road Stadium
19:45		report	Bouazza 5'; Keogh 70'; Kane 88'	Attendance: 6,392

10 March 2012 36	Nottingham Forest	3–1	Millwall	City Ground
15:00	McCleary 25'; Higginbotham 38'; Reid 80'	report	Darius Henderson 64'	Attendance: 19,413

17 March 2012 37	Millwall	2–3	Southampton	The Den
15:00	Fonte 23' (o.g.); Robinson 28'	report	Lambert 18', 85', 88'	Attendance: 12,144

20 March 2012 38	Doncaster Rovers	0–3	Millwall	Keepmoat Stadium
19:45		report	Keogh 8'; Kane 15'; Henderson 58'	Attendance: 7,572

24 March 2012 39	Millwall	0–1	Leeds United	The Den
15:00		report	McCormack 65'	Attendance: 14,309

31 March 2012 40	Cardiff City	0–0	Millwall	Cardiff City Stadium
12:30		report		Attendance: 21,259

7 April 2012 41	Millwall	2–0	Hull City	The Den
15:00	Kane 25'; Keogh 81' (o.g.)	report		Attendance: 12,372

10 April 2012 42	Portsmouth	0–1	Millwall	Fratton Park
19:45		report	Kane 37'	Attendance: 15,837

14 April 2012 43	Millwall	2–1	Leicester City	The Den
15:00	Kane 23'; Keogh 55' (pen.)	report	Drinkwater 82'	Attendance: 11,525

17 April 2012 44	Coventry City	0–1	Millwall	Ricoh Arena
19:45		report	Lowry 66'	Attendance: 13,974

21 April 2012 45	Ipswich Town	0–3	Millwall	Portman Road
15:00		report	Keogh 3', 87'; Trotter 63'	Attendance: 18,947

28 April 2012 46	Millwall	2–2	Blackpool	The Den
12:30	Keogh 12'; Craig (yellow card) 38'; Kane 83'; Henry (yellow card) 89'	Report	Evatt 27'; Dicko 71' (yellow card) 72'	Attendance: 13,122

=== League Cup ===
9 August 2011 1st round	Plymouth Argyle	0–1	Millwall	Home Park
19:45		Report	N'Guessan 14'	Attendance: 4,781; Referee: Keith Stroud

23 August 2011 2nd round	Millwall	2–0	Morecambe	The Den
19:45	Bouazza 34'; Mkandawire 45+2'	Report

20 September 2011 3rd round	Wolverhampton Wanderers	5–0	Millwall	Molineux Stadium
19:45	Edwards 3'; Hammill 7'; Elokobi 38'; Spray 77'; Guedioura 88'	report		Attendance: 7,749; Referee: Wright

=== FA Cup ===
7 January 2012 3rd round	Dagenham & Redbridge	0–0	Millwall	London Borough of Barking & Dagenham Stadium
19:45		report		Attendance: 3,369; Referee: Salisbury

17 January 2012 3rd round replay	Millwall	5–0	Dagenham & Redbridge	The Den
19:45	Henderson 7', 59', 63' (pen.); Kane 41', 65'	report		Attendance: 3,751; Referee: Mathieson

28 January 2012 Round 4	Millwall	1–1	Southampton	The Den
15:00	Henderson 86'	report	Lambert 31'	Attendance: 8,278; Referee: East

7 February 2012 Round 4 replay	Southampton	2–3	Millwall	St Mary's Stadium
19:45	Lallana 35'; Lambert 77'	report	Trotter 17'; N'Guessan 79'; Feeney 90+2'	Attendance: 8,493; Referee: Whitestone

28 February 2012 Round 5	Millwall	0–2	Bolton Wanderers	The Den
15:00		report	Miyaichi 4'; Ngog 59'	Attendance: 11,320; Referee: Kevin Friend

=== Championship ===
==== Standings ====
Pos	Team	Pld	W	D	L	GF	GA	GD	Pts
14	Leeds United	46	17	10	19	65	68	−3	61
15	Ipswich Town	46	17	10	19	69	77	−8	61
16	Millwall	46	15	12	19	55	57	−2	57
17	Crystal Palace	46	13	17	16	46	51	−5	56
18	Peterborough United	46	13	11	22	67	77	−10	50

Updated to match(es) played on 28 April 2012. Source: BBC Sport
Rules for classification: 1) points; 2) goal difference; 3) number of goals scored.

== Squad statistics ==
=== Appearances and goals ===
As of 29 April 2012

No.	Pos	Nat	Player	Total		Championship		FA Cup		League Cup	
No.	Pos	Nat	Player	Apps	Goals	Apps	Goals	Apps	Goals	Apps	Goals
1	GK	(Republic of Ireland) IRL	David Forde	30	0	27+0	0	3+0	0	0+0	0
2	DF	(Republic of Ireland) IRL	Alan Dunne	35	0	25+5	0	3+0	0	2+0	0
3	DF	(England) ENG	Tony Craig	28	0	21+2	0	2+0	0	3+0	0
5	DF	(England) ENG	Paul Robinson	44	1	41+0	1	3+0	0	0+0	0
6	MF	(England) ENG	Liam Trotter	40	7	33+2	6	5+0	1	0+0	0
7	FW	(England) ENG	Darius Henderson	34	19	25+6	15	3+0	4	0+0	0
8	MF	(Algeria) ALG	Hamer Bouazza	32	3	19+7	2	1+2	0	2+1	1
9	FW	(England) ENG	John Marquis	21	1	7+10	1	1+0	0	3+0	0
10	FW	(Northern Ireland) NIR	Josh McQuoid	8	0	1+4	0	0+2	0	1+0	0
11	FW	(England) ENG	Shaun Batt	6	0	0+4	0	0+2	0	0+0	0
12	MF	(England) ENG	Chris Hackett	6	0	0+3	0	0+1	0	2+0	0
13	GK	(England) ENG	Ryan Allsop	0	0	0+0	0	0+0	0	0+0	0
14	MF	(England) ENG	James Henry	45	0	24+15	0	3+1	0	1+1	0
15	MF	(England) ENG	Liam Feeney	39	5	27+7	4	4+1	1	0+0	0
16	DF	(England) ENG	Scott Barron	28	0	18+2	0	5+0	0	1+2	0
17	MF	(England) ENG	Tamika Mkandawire	15	1	10+3	0	0+0	0	1+1	1
18	DF	(England) ENG	Darren Ward	36	0	27+3	0	4+0	0	2+0	0
19	MF	(Guadeloupe) GLP	Therry Racon	1	0	0+0	0	0+0	0	1+0	0
20	FW	(Republic of Ireland) IRL	Andy Keogh	19	10	17+1	10	1+0	0	0+0	0
21	DF	(England) ENG	Jack Smith	39	0	30+3	0	4+0	0	2+0	0
22	MF	(France) FRA	Dany N'Guessan	19	3	6+9	1	1+1	1	2+0	1
23	GK	(England) ENG	Steve Mildenhall	15	0	9+1	0	2+0	0	3+0	0
24	MF	(England) ENG	Nick Montgomery	2	0	0+2	0	0+0	0	0+0	0
25	MF	(England) ENG	Jake Gallagher	0	0	0+0	0	0+0	0	0+0	0
26	MF	(Comoros) COM	Jimmy Abdou	45	0	35+5	0	2+0	0	3+0	0
27	DF	(England) ENG	Nathan Baker	3	0	3+0	0	0+0	0	0+0	0
28	DF	(England) ENG	Connor McLaren	0	0	0+0	0	0+0	0	0+0	0
29	DF	(England) ENG	Jordan Stewart	7	0	3+1	0	0+0	0	3+0	0
30	FW	(Republic of Ireland) IRL	Aiden O'Brien	1	0	0+0	0	0+0	0	0+1	0
31	DF	(Australia) AUS	Shane Lowry	23	1	22+0	1	1+0	0	0+0	0
32	MF	(England) ENG	Ryan Mason	6	0	3+2	0	1+0	0	0+0	0
33	FW	(England) ENG	Tobi Alabi	0	0	0+0	0	0+0	0	0+0	0
37	FW	(England) ENG	Harry Kane	27	9	19+3	7	5+0	2	0+0	0
39	GK	(Northern Ireland) NIR	Maik Taylor	9	0	9+0	0	0+0	0	0+0	0
44	MF	(England) ENG	Josh Wright	21	1	16+2	1	1+2	0	0+0	0
Players featured for club who have left:
	FW	(Ghana) GHA	Patrick Agyemang	2	0	1+1	0	0+0	0	0+0	0
	MF	(England) ENG	Brian Howard	9	0	9+0	0	0+0	0	0+0	0
	DF	(England) ENG	Darren Purse	1	0	0+0	0	0+0	0	1+0	0
	FW	(England) ENG	Jay Simpson	11	4	7+3	4	0+0	0	1+0	0

=== Top scorers ===
Place	Position	Nationality	Number	Name	Championship	FA Cup	League Cup	Total
1	FW	(England)	7	Darius Henderson	15	4	0	19
2	FW	(Republic of Ireland)	20	Andy Keogh	10	0	0	10
3	FW	(England)	37	Harry Kane	7	2	0	9
=	MF	(England)	6	Liam Trotter	6	1	0	7
5	MF	(England)	15	Liam Feeney	4	1	0	5
6	FW	(England)	~~20~~	Jay Simpson	4	0	0	4
7	MF	(Algeria)	8	Hamer Bouazza	2	0	1	3
8	MF	(France)	22	Dany N'Guessan	1	1	1	3
9	DF	(Australia)	31	Shane Lowry	1	0	0	1
=	FW	(England)	9	John Marquis	1	0	0	1
=	FW	(England)	17	Tamika Mkandawire	0	0	1	1
=	DF	(England)	5	Paul Robinson	1	0	0	1
=	Own Goals				1	0	0	1
				TOTALS	53	9	3	65

=== Disciplinary record ===
Number	Nationality	Position	Name	Championship		FA Cup		League Cup		Total	
Number	Nationality	Position	Name	Booked	Sent off (straight red)	Booked	Sent off (straight red)	Booked	Sent off (straight red)	Booked	Sent off (straight red)
31	(Australia)	DF	Shane Lowry	7	1	0	0	0	0	7	1
2	(England)	DF	Alan Dunne	4	1	1	0	0	0	5	1
14	(England)	MF	James Henry	9	0	0	0	0	0	9	0
7	(England)	FW	Darius Henderson	8	0	0	0	0	0	8	0
9	(England)	FW	John Marquis	5	0	0	0	1	0	6	0
5	(England)	DF	Paul Robinson	5	0	0	0	1	0	6	0
6	(England)	MF	Liam Trotter	6	0	0	0	0	0	6	0
21	(England)	DF	Jack Smith	4	0	1	0	0	0	5	0
26	(Comoros)	MF	Jimmy Abdou	2	0	0	0	1	0	3	0
16	(England)	DF	Scott Barron	3	0	0	0	0	0	3	0
24	(England)	MF	Brian Howard	3	0	0	0	0	0	3	0
44	(England)	MF	Josh Wright	3	0	0	0	0	0	3	0
8	(Algeria)	MF	Hamer Bouazza	1	0	0	0	1	0	2	0
15	(England)	MF	Liam Feeney	1	0	1	0	0	0	2	0
1	(Republic of Ireland)	GK	David Forde	2	0	0	0	0	0	2	0
29	(England)	DF	Jordan Stewart	2	0	0	0	0	0	2	0
18	(England)	DF	Darren Ward	2	0	0	0	0	0	2	0
3	(England)	DF	Tony Craig	1	0	0	0	0	0	1	0
37	(England)	FW	Harry Kane	1	0	0	0	0	0	1	0
20	(Republic of Ireland)	FW	Andy Keogh	1	0	0	0	0	0	1	0
32	(England)	MF	Ryan Mason	1	0	0	0	0	0	1	0
22	(France)	MF	Dany N'Guessan	1	0	0	0	0	0	1	0
20	(England)	FW	Jay Simpson	1	0	0	0	0	0	1	0
39	(Northern Ireland)	GK	Maik Taylor	1	0	0	0	0	0	1	0
			TOTALS	74	2	3	0	3	0	81	2

== Squad ==
=== Detailed overview ===
No.	Name	Nat.	Place of birth	Date of birth	Club apps.	Club goals	Int. caps	Int. goals	Previous club	Date joined	Fee
1	David Forde	(Republic of Ireland)	Galway	20 December 1979	162	0	2	0	Cardiff City	5 June 2008	Free
2	Alan Dunne	(Republic of Ireland)	Dublin	23 August 1982	252	20	–	–	N/A	1 June 2000	Trainee
3	Tony Craig	(England)	London	20 April 1985	205	7	–	–	Crystal Palace	11 July 2008	Undisclosed
5	Paul Robinson	(England)	London	7 January 1982	287	22	–	–	N/A	1 August 2001	Trainee
6	Liam Trotter	(England)	Ipswich	24 August 1988	60	9	–	–	Ipswich Town	24 June 2010	Free
7	Darius Henderson	(England)	Sutton	7 September 1981	–	–	–	–	Sheffield United	29 June 2011	Undisclosed
8	Hamer Bouazza	(Algeria)	Évry (France)	22 February 1985	12	1	15	2	Arles-Avignon	28 January 2011	£87,000
9	John Marquis	(England)	London	16 May 1992	13	4	–	–	N/A	1 August 2009	Trainee
10	Josh McQuoid	(Northern Ireland)	Southampton (England)	15 December 1989	11	1	3	0	Bournemouth	6 January 2011	£515,000
11	Shaun Batt	(England)	Luton	22 February 1987	17	3	–	–	Peterborough United	16 June 2010	Undisclosed
12	Chris Hackett	(England)	Oxford	1 March 1983	139	6	–	–	Heart of Midlothian	3 August 2006	Free
14	James Henry	(England)	Reading	10 June 1989	73	13	–	–	Reading	28 July 2010	Undisclosed
16	Scott Barron	(England)	Preston	2 September 1985	104	3	–	–	Ipswich Town	26 June 2007	Free
17	Tamika Mkandawire	(England)	Mzuzu (Malawi)	28 May 1983	38	1	–	–	Leyton Orient	16 June 2010	Free
18	Darren Ward	(England)	London	13 September 1978	232	6	–	–	Wolverhampton Wanderers	1 January 2010	Free
19	Therry Racon	(Guadeloupe)	Villeneuve-Saint-Georges (France)	1 May 1984	–	–	3	0	Charlton Athletic	1 July 2011	Free
20	Andy Keogh	(Republic of Ireland)	Dublin	16 May 1986	–	–	22	1	Wolverhampton Wanderers	31 January 2012	Undisclosed
21	Jack Smith	(England)	Hemel Hempstead	14 October 1983	52	2	–	–	Swindon Town	2 August 2009	Undisclosed
22	Dany N'Guessan	(France)	Ivry-sur-Seine	11 August 1987	–	–	–	–	Leicester City	31 August 2011	Free
23	Steve Mildenhall	(England)	Swindon	13 May 1978	–	–	–	–	Southend United	13 July 2010	Free
24	Nick Montgomery	(England)	Leeds	28 October 1981	–	–	–	–	Sheffield United	19 March 2012	Loan
26	Jimmy Abdou	(Comoros)	Martigues (France)	13 July 1984	132	5	1	0	Plymouth Argyle	3 July 2008	Free
29	Jordan Stewart	(England)	Birmingham	3 March 1982	–	–	–	–	Skoda Xanthi	7 July 2011	Free
31	Shane Lowry	(Australia)	Perth	12 June 1989	–	–	–	–	Aston Villa	27 January 2012	Undisclosed
32	Ryan Mason	(England)	London	13 June 1991	–	–	–	–	Tottenham Hotspur	29 December 2011	Loan
37	Harry Kane	(England)	Walthamstow	28 July 1993	–	–	–	–	Tottenham Hotspur	29 December 2011	Loan
39	Maik Taylor	(Northern Ireland)	Hildesheim (West Germany)	4 September 1971	–	–	–	–	Leeds United	12 March 2012	Loan
44	Josh Wright	(England)	Tower Hamlets	6 November 1989	–	–	–	–	Free Agent	15 November 2011	Free

=== Contracts ===
No.	Pos.	Nat.	Name	Age	Status	Contract length	Expiry date	Source
9	FW	(England)	John Marquis	19	Signed	3 year	2014	
30	FW	(Republic of Ireland)	Aiden O'Brien	17	Signed	3 year	2014	

== Transfers ==
=== Summer ===
==== In ====
No.	Pos.	Nat.	Name	Age	EU	Moving from	Type	Transfer window	Ends	Transfer fee	Source
13	GK	(England)	Allsop	18	EU	West Bromwich Albion	Bosman transfer	Summer	Undisclosed	Free	
19	MF	(France)	Racon	27	EU	Charlton Athletic	Bosman transfer	Summer	2013	Free	
7	FW	(England)	Henderson	29	EU	Sheffield United	Transfer	Summer	2013	Undisclosed	
29	DF	(England)	Stewart	29	EU	Skoda Xanthi (Greece)	Transfer	Summer	2012	Free	
22	MF	(France)	N'Guessan	23	EU	Leicester City	Loan	Summer	2012	5 month loan	
15	MF	(England)	Feeney	24	EU	Bournemouth	Transfer	Summer	2014	Undisclosed	
22	MF	(France)	N'Guessan	23	EU	Leicester City	Transfer	Summer	2014	Free	
20	FW	(England)	Simpson	22	EU	Hull City	Loan	Summer	2012	5 month loan	
24	MF	(England)	Howard	28	EU	Reading	Loan		2012	3 month loan	
27	FW	(Ghana) (England)	Agyemang	31	EU	Queens Park Rangers	Loan		2011	1 month loan	
44	MF	(England)	Wright	22	EU	Free	Free Transfer		2012	Free	
37	FW	(England)	Kane	18	EU	Tottenham Hotspur	Loan	Winter	2012	Season loan	
32	MF	(England)	Mason	20	EU	Tottenham Hotspur	Loan	Winter	2012	Season loan	
31	DF	(Australia)	Lowry	22	EU	Aston Villa	Transfer	Winter	2014	Undisclosed	
20	FW	(Republic of Ireland)	Keogh	25	EU	Wolverhampton Wanderers	Transfer	Winter	2014	Undisclosed	
39	GK	(Northern Ireland)	Taylor	40	EU	Leeds United	Loan		2012	Season loan	
24	MF	(England)	Montgomery	30	EU	Sheffield United	Loan		2012	Season loan	

==== Out ====
No.	Pos.	Name	Country	Age	Type	Moving to	Transfer window	Transfer fee	Apps	Goals	Source
25	FW	Robinson	(England)	22	Bosman transfer	Derby County	Summer	Undisclosed	11	3	
13	GK	Sullivan	(England)	23	Transfer	Charlton Athletic	Summer	Free	1	0	
20	FW	Morison	(Wales) (England)	27	Transfer	Norwich City	Summer	Undisclosed	90	40	
9	FW	Harris	(England)	33	Transfer	Southend United	Summer	Free	426	138	
19	FW	Grimes	(England)	24	Free transfer	Rochdale	Summer	Free	30	2	
24	MF	Laird	(Scotland)	25	Transfer	Leyton Orient	Summer	Undisclosed	78	6	
4	DF	Purse	(England)	34	Free transfer	Plymouth Argyle	Winter	Undisclosed	14	1	

EU = if holds or not a European Union passport; Country: when 2 flags, 1st flag = country that plays for internationally, 2nd flag = country of birth; N = number on jersey; P = Position (for position name, pause mouse pointer on abbreviation); Name = Name on jersey (for more extensive name, pause mouse pointer on name); Age = age on the day of the signing; Moving from = only indicate the club the player was playing before start playing for this club in this season, for the type of the moving see Status column; Moving to = only indicates the club the player is going to play next, for the type of the moving see Status column; Ends = when the player's current contract ends; n/a = Not applicable.
