= Nadjim Abdou =

Footballer (born 1984)

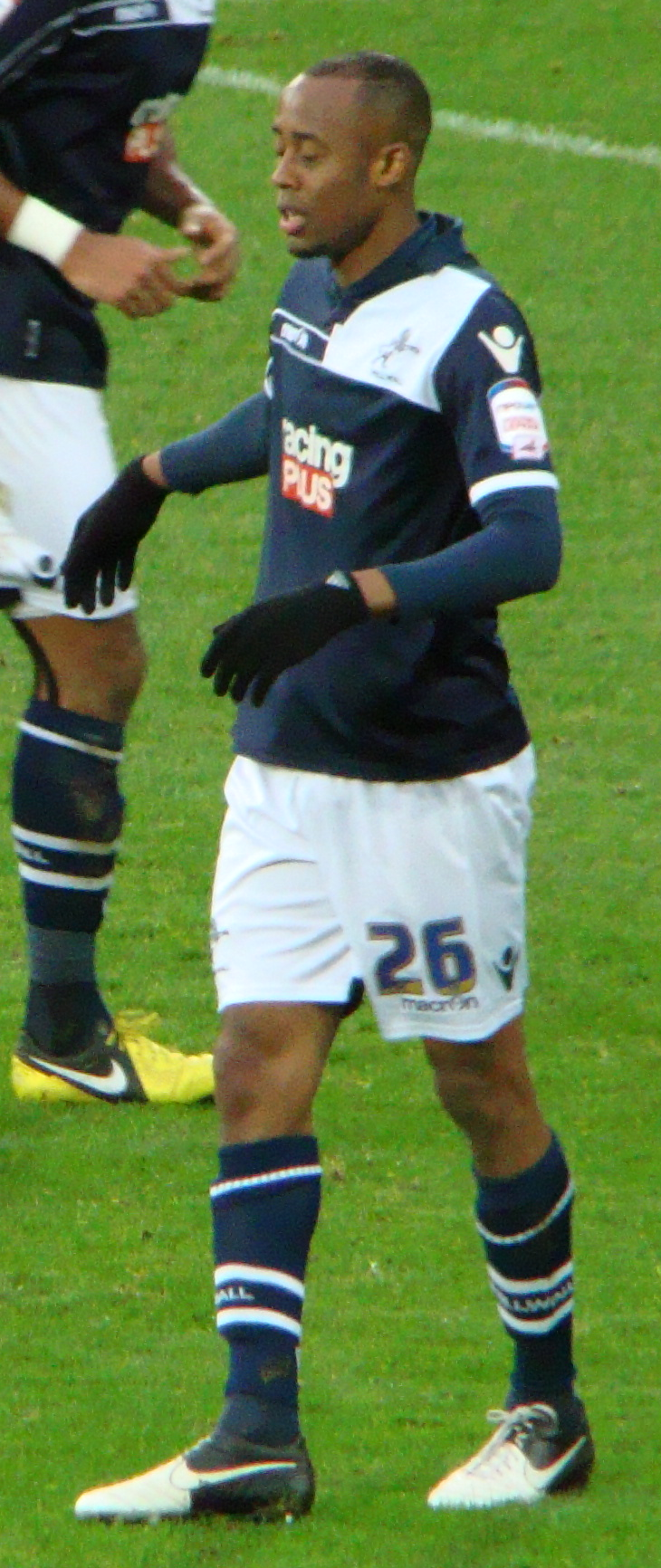
- Abdou playing for Millwall in 2012

Personal information
- Full name: Nadjim Abdou
- Date of birth: 13 July 1984 (age 42)
- Place of birth: Martigues, France
- Height: 5 ft 11 in (1.80 m)
- Position: Midfielder

Senior career*
Years	Team	Apps	(Gls)
2002–2003	Martigues	26	(1)
2003–2007	Sedan	80	(2)
2007–2008	Plymouth Argyle	31	(1)
2008–2018	Millwall	290	(8)
2017–2018	→ AFC Wimbledon (loan)	34	(2)
2018–2022	Martigues	61	(3)
Total		522	(17)

International career
2010–2022	Comoros	39	(0)
- * Club domestic league appearances and goals

Nadjim "Jimmy" Abdou (born 13 July 1984) is a former professional footballer who played as a midfielder.

Starting his career in his hometown club of Martigues, Abdou later went on to play in Ligue 1 with Sedan before moving to England with Plymouth Argyle. From 2008 to 2017, he played for Millwall, where he scored nine goals in 342 appearances. In 2018, Abdou returned to Martigues.

Born in France, Abdou is Comorian through his parents. He made his international debut for the Comoros in October 2010, and played for his nation at the 2021 Africa Cup of Nations.

== Club career ==
=== Early career ===
Born in Martigues, Bouches-du-Rhône, Abdou started out with his home-town club Martigues, first joining the club when he was seven years old. After progressing through the ranks, Abdou was promoted to the first team in 2002 and spent one season with them, making twenty–six appearances and scoring two times.

=== Sedan ===
After one season at Martigues, Abdou joined Sedan on 25 July 2003.

Abdou appeared in the Sedan's first team as an unused substitute in the opening game of the season, in a 2–0 loss against Istres. Afterwards, Abdou spent six months, playing for the club's reserve side before getting his first team opportunity. On 6 December 2003, he made his Sedan debut, starting the whole game, in a 0–0 draw against Grenoble. At the end of the 2003–04 season, Abdou went on to make eighteen appearances in all competitions.

In the 2004–05 season, Abdou became a first team regular for Sedan and featured in a number of matches throughout the season. Abdou then scored his first goal for the club on 12 November 2004, in a 2–0 win over Montpellier. For his performance, he signed a two–year contract with Sedan the following month. His second goal for the club came on 25 January 2005, in a 2–1 win over Amiens. At the end of the 2004–05 season, Abdou went on to make thirty–six appearances and scoring two times in all competitions.

In the 2005–06 season, Abdou found himself behind the pecking order in the first team and came on as a substitute in number of matches, due to his poor performances. This also combined with his own injury concern. At the end of the 2005–06 season, making fifteen appearances, the club was promoted to Ligue 1 after three seasons in Ligue 2.

In the 2006–07 season, Abdou missed the first half of the season, due to being suspended and playing in the club's reserve side. On 18 November 2006, he made his first Ligue 1 appearance of the season, coming on as a substitute for Jérôme Le Moigne in the 49th minute, and scored an own goal, in a 1–0 loss against Lyon. Abdou became a first team regular for Sedan since returning from the sideline. However, later in the season, he soon found himself out of the first team, due to being suspended. Abdou played one season in Ligue 1 in the club finished in 19th place and were relegated.

Following the club's relegation, Abdou was released by Sedan. He then joined Clermont on a free transfer, signing a one–year contract. However, the move was denied by the club, themselves.

=== Plymouth Argyle ===
After a trial in the summer of 2007, Abdou joined English Football League Championship club Plymouth Argyle, signing on a free transfer on 20 August until the end of the 2007–08 season.

He made his first league appearance on 25 August 2007 as a 62nd-minute substitute in a 3–2 defeat at Barnsley. However, Abdou found himself out of the first team between September and November, due to strong competitions in the club's midfield position. On 6 November 2007, he returned to the first team from the sidelines, starting a match before being substituted in the 58th minute, in a 1 –1 draw against Colchester United. Since returning to the first team from the sidelines, Abdou regained his first team place for Plymouth Argyle and began playing in the right–back position for the rest of the season. He scored his first goal in English football against Scunthorpe United in a 3–0 win at Home Park on 1 December 2007. As a result, Abdou was nominated for the club's Player of the Month for December but lost out to Sylvan Ebanks-Blake. He then scored his second goal for the club in the third round of the FA Cup on 5 January 2008, in a 3–2 win over Hull City. At the end of the 2007–08 season, Abdou went on to make thirty–three appearances and scoring two times in all competitions.

After contract discussions in April 2008, Abdou left Plymouth in June 2008 after turning down the club's contract offer and signed for Millwall on 3 July 2008.

=== Millwall ===
Abdou made his Millwall debut, starting a match before being substituted in the 75th minute, in a 4–3 loss against Oldham Athletic in the opening game of the season. Since joining the club, he quickly became a fan favourite among Millwall's supporters. Abdou's signature has turned out to be something of a coup for manager Kenny Jackett. In spite of one or two short-term injuries, Abdou has been successful at the club, holding down a regular first team slot in central midfield when fit. On 11 October 2008, he scored his first Millwall goal, in a 3–1 win against Tranmere Rovers. However, in a 1–0 win over Hereford United on 28 October 2008, Abdou was sent–off in the 49th minute for a "double-footed lunge" on Clint Easton and served a two match suspension. He made his return from suspension on 22 November 2008, coming on as a second-half substitute, in a 0–0 draw against Leyton Orient. At the beginning of January, Abdou missed three matches through injury and made his return on 17 January 2009, coming on as a substitute in the second half, in a 1–0 win over Tranmere Rovers. He later scored twice for the club, in a 4–2 loss against Bristol Rovers on 18 April 2009. Abdou scored the winning goal in the League One Playoff Semi-finals against Leeds United at Elland Road on 14 May 2009 to send them to Wembley for their first ever playoff final, which Millwall lost 3–2 to Scunthorpe United. Abdou later reflected that scoring against Leeds United was a turning point of his career. After missing out on promotion during the 2008–09 season, he went on to make forty–three appearances and scoring four times in his first season at the club.

At the start of the 2009–10 season, Abdou scored in Millwall's first game of the season against Southampton, with a header, it turned out to be his only goal of the season. However, shortly after, he suffered an injury during a 4–0 win over AFC Bournemouth and was out for weeks. Abdou made his return from injury, starting the whole game, in a 1–1 draw against Brighton & Hove Albion on 29 August 2009. His performance saw him signed a contract extension with the club, keeping him until 2013. During a 4–4 draw against local rivals Charlton Athletic on 19 December 2009, Abdou was sent–off for a professional foul in the 37th minute. Charlton successfully converted the resulting penalty. But he did not serve a match ban and returned in a next match on 26 December 2009 against Norwich City, which they lost 2–0. Abdou continued to establish himself in the first team, playing in the midfield position for the rest of the season and later helped play a big part in earning Millwall's promotion later in the 2009–10 season. The club was eventually promoted after beating Swindon Town in the play-off final. At the 2009–10 season, Abdou went on to make fifty–two appearances and scoring once in all competition.

However, Abdou missed the opening game of the season, due to the injury he sustained in a friendly match against Hearts. On 14 August 2010, Abdou made his first appearance of the 2010–11 season, starting the whole game, in a 4–0 win over Hull City. Two weeks later on 28 August 2010, he set up a goal for Liam Trotter to score the club's second goal of the game, in a 3–1 win over Coventry City. Abdou continued to establish himself in the first team, playing in the midfield position for Millwall. However, he sustained a knee injury during a 2–1 loss against Reading on 22 February 2011 and was out for a month. On 16 April 2011, Abdou returned from injury, starting the match before being substituted at half time, in a 2–1 loss against Coventry City, having appeared in the substitute bench for the last two matches. At the end of the 2010–11 season, he went on to make thirty–six appearances in all competitions.

The start of the 2011–12 season saw Abdou receiving his playing time, coming from the substitute bench. He soon continued to establish himself in the first team, playing in the midfield position for Millwall. Throughout the 2011–12 season, Abdou faced his own injury concerns on three separate occasions. Despite this, he continued to be featured in the first team for the club and was praised by manager Jackett. In April 2012, Abdou was named as the club's Player of the Year for the 2011–12 season after a vote by Millwall's supporters. Upon hearing the award, he said: "I would like to thank all the fans who voted for me, and my team mates as well because this is a team game". At the end of the 2011–12 season, Abdou made forty–five appearances in all competitions. Shortly after, Millwall began talks with the player over a new contract. Following this, it was reported that Abdou received treatment over his injury he sustained over the summer.

In the 2012–13 season, Abdou continued to establish himself in the first team, playing in the midfield position for Millwall and formed a partnership with Josh Wright. During a match against Bolton Wanderers on 6 October 2012, he suffered ankle injury and played through the game, as the club won 2–1. Abdou soon recovered after a two weeks international break and started the whole game, in a 2–2 draw against rivals, Crystal Palace on 20 October 2012. Following this, Abdou signed a two–year contract with Millwall, keeping him until 2015. After missing two matches in mid–December, due to suspension and given a compassionate leave, Abdou then appointed as a captain in a FA Cup match, in a 1–0 win over Preston North End. After the match, he said that given the captaincy was an honour for him. He again captained the club once again on 16 February 2013 against Luton Town in the fifth round of the FA Cup and beat them 3–0 to progress to the next round. Three days later on 19 February 2013, Abdou captained Millwall for the third time this season, in a 5–1 loss against Peterborough United on 16 February 2013. Manager Jackett mentioned Abdou in the post-game interview, quoting: "You could see the danger from the sidelines – not enough players on the pitch could sense that danger and were able to react or cut the ball out – probably Jimmy Abdou apart." After appearing two matches as an unused substitute in early–April, he scored on his return to the starting line-up, in a 2–1 loss against Sheffield Wednesday on 9 April 2013. At the end of the 2012–13 season, Abdou made thirty–nine appearances and scoring once in all competitions. However, Kenny Jackett, a manager who signed him, left the club.

At the start of the 2013–14 season, Abdou found himself on the substitute bench under the new management of Steve Lomas. By September, he regained his first team place, playing in the midfield position. His return performance received praises by Manager Lomas, saying: "Abdou is a better player than he is given him credit for and he can pass the ball. I keep hearing people say he can't pass the ball. I watch him in training every day and he can pass the ball. He has bided his time, got in the team and like I’ve said to the lads when you are in the team, keep the shirt." Abdou then set up a goal for Scott Malone to score the club's second goal of the game, in a 2–0 win over Leeds United on 28 September 2013. However, he was sent–off for a second bookable offence in the 85th minute, in a 1–1 draw against Reading on 26 October 2013. After sustaining from a groin injury, Abdou returned to the first team and started a number of matches from December and January. However, he soon lost his first team place following the new management of Ian Holloway and found himself in the substitute bench later in the season. Despite this, Abdou only appeared in the four times first team under Holloway, though he made two starts for Millwall. Abdou finished the 2013–14 season, making twenty–seven appearances in all competitions.

In the 2014–15 season, Abdou started Millwall's first five matches at the start of the season before he missed out three matches, due to being given a compassionate leave. Abdou then returned to the starting line–up, starting the whole game, in a 3–2 loss against Reading on 16 September 2014. A week later on 27 September 2014, he played in the right–back position for the first time, starting the whole game, in a 2–1 loss against Huddersfield Town. Due to facing competition in the midfield position, Holloway acknowledged his first team status, saying: "Abdou was playing very well in midfield so I don't know what I'll do with him. I was really surprised by how well he did against Forest – against one of the best wingers in the division." As a result, Abdou soon lost his first team place as a result and this lasted until December. He made his return to the first team, coming on as a late substitute, in a 1–0 win over Brighton & Hove Albion on 12 December 2014. Abdou regained his first team place in the midfield position for the club since returning to the first team and partnered with Shaun Williams. After being dropped on the substitute bench for one match, he then switched to the right–back position for four matches. Towards the end of the 2014–15 season, Abdou then reverted to his midfield position. On 14 April 2015, he scored his first goal of the season, in a 2–0 win over Wigan Athletic. However, Millwall was relegated after five seasons in the Championship after Rotherham United's 2–1 win against Reading on 28 April 2015. At the end of the 2014–15 season, Abdou made thirty–seven appearances and scoring once in all competitions. For his performance, he was named as the club's Player of the Year once again for the 2014–15 season after a vote by Millwall's supporters, as well as, winning two more awards. Abdou also signed a two–year contract extension with the club after they offered him one.

However, Abdou missed the first three matches of the 2015–16 season, due to a hamstring injury. He made his first appearance of the season, starting the whole game, in a 3–2 loss against Barnsley on 18 August 2015. Since returning from injury, Abdou quickly regained his first team place for the club, playing in the midfield position. On 26 September 2015, he scored his first Millwall goal, in a 3–1 win over Rochdale. In a follow–up match against Wigan Athletic, Abdou set up a goal for Fred Onyedinma to score the club's first goal of the game, in a 2–2 draw. However, during a 5–3 loss against Peterborough United on 3 October 2015, Abdou suffered a shoulder injury and had to be substituted; which after the match, he was out for two months. On 26 December 2015, Abdou made his return from injury, starting the whole game, in a 1–0 loss against Walsall. In a match against Port Vale on 17 January 2016, he made his 300th appearance for Millwall, as the club won 3–1. Abdou then continued to regain his first team place, playing in the midfield position since returning from injury. This lasted until he missed four matches, due to international commitment. Following his return, Abdou continued to regain his first team place towards the end of the season and went on to play a vital role in the League One play-offs that saw Millwall reach the final against Barnsley. During the match, he became the first Millwall player to appear for the club four times at Wembley Stadium, but the club went on lose 3–1. At the end of the 2015–16 season, he went on to make thirty–one appearances and scoring in all competitions.

In the 2016–17 season, Abdou made only three starts for Millwall, including scoring against West Bromwich Albion U23 in the EFL Trophy match. After the match, Manager Neil Harris said: "What Jimmy's got is the ability to make a forward run at the right time. I'm always on at Jim – and I’ve known him a long time – about finishing, finishing, finishing. The way we play and the form we’ve been in over the last 10 months our midfield players should be scoring goals. Jimmy had three really good opportunities last week (against Nottingham Forest) that could have won us the game comfortably, and he didn't take them. So I'm really pleased that he scored." However, Abdou found himself competing in the midfield position against Shaun Williams, Ben Thompson. This resulted him dropping into the substitute bench for most of the 2016–17 season, and to get playing time, he played for the club's reserve side. Despite this, Abdou made first team starts on several occasions throughout the season. Towards the end of the 2016–17 season, he started Millwall's last four matches, including playing in both legs against Scunthorpe United in the League One play-offs, which the club won 3–2 on aggregate. Abdou started in the League One play-off final, as he helped Millwall beat Bradford City 1–0 to see the club promoted to the Championship. At the end of the 2016–17 season, Abdou went on to make twenty–two appearances and scoring once in all competitions. Following this, he signed a one–year contract with the club.

He was released by Millwall at the end of the 2017–18 season, ending his ten years association with the club, Following this, it was announced that Abdou would get his testimonial match against VfL Bochum on 28 July 2018. The match ended with a 1–0 win for Millwall.

==== Loan to AFC Wimbledon ====
On 15 July 2017, Abdou joined AFC Wimbledon on a season-long loan. Upon joining the club, he was given a number eight shirt.

Abdou scored on his debut for AFC Wimbledon in a 1–1 draw at Scunthorpe United on 5 August 2017. Despite suffering from ankle injury shortly after, he then became a first team regular for the club, playing in the midfield position. However, in a match against Blackpool on 2 September 2017, Abdou "received a straight red card for a two-footed tackle on Callum Cooke", as AFC Wimbledon lost 1–0 and served a three match suspension as a result. On 26 September 2017, he returned to the first team from suspension, coming on as a 76th-minute substitute in a 1–0 loss against Southend United. Abdou found himself in and out of the starting eleven for the club, as he was often placed on the substitute bench and being called to the national squad on two occasions. Abdou then regained his first team place for AFC Wimbledon by December, playing in the midfield position. He then scored his second goal for the club, in a 4–0 win over Bradford City on 27 January 2018. For his performance throughout January, Abdou was nominated for January's PFA Player of the Month for League One, but lost out to John-Joe O'Toole. He later appeared in and out of the first team for AFC Wimbledon towards the end of the season and helped the club retain their League One status next season. At the end of the 2017–18 season, Abdou went on to make thirty–nine appearances and scoring two times in all competitions.

=== Return to Martigues ===
After being released by Millwall, Abdou was re-signed by his hometown club Martigues, returning to France for the first time in eleven years.

Abdou made his second debut for Martigues in the opening game of the season, starting the whole game, in a 3–0 win over Annecy. In a follow-up match against Hyères, he scored his first goal for the club, in a 1–0 win. Abdou later scored his second goal for Martigues, in a 2–0 win over Pontarlier on 15 September 2018. Since joining the club, he established himself in the starting eleven and was appointed as their new captain. Abdou, however, found himself out of the first team, due to having injuries on two separate occasions. In his first season return at FC Martigues, he made twenty–five appearances and scoring two times in all competitions.

At the start of the 2019–20 season, Abdou continued to regain his first team place in the starting line–up for Martigues. He also continued to retain his captaincy as well. However, the season was suspended indefinitely on 12 March 2020 due to the COVID-19 pandemic. Eventually, the league was eventually cancelled on 30 April 2020, as FC Martigues finished fifth place in the league.

In the 2020–21 season, Abdou appeared five times in the club's first six league matches of the season, appearing three times as captain. However, he found himself out of the first team after suffering an injury during a 3–0 loss against Monaco's second team on 19 September 2020. As a result, Abdou never played again for the rest of the 2020–21 season, as he made five appearances in all competitions.

Ahead of the 2021–22 season, Abdou made his return from injury in FC Matrigues’ pre–season tour. He then made three starts as captain in the club's three league matches of the season. After not playing for FC Matrigues for a month due to international commitments, Abdou made his return to the first team, coming on as 80th-minute substitute, in a 1–1 draw against Saint-Priest on 23 October 2021. After not playing for the club for a month, due to international commitment for the second time this season, he made his first team return, starting the whole game as captain, in a 2–0 win against RC Grasse on 5 February 2022. In a follow–up match against Hyères, Abdou scored his first goal of the season (and his first goal for FC Martigues in three years), in a 3–1 win. However, he soon lost his first team place at the club and spent a month on the substitute bench. But Abdou started the match as captain on the last game of the season against Marignane Gignac Côte Bleue and helped FC Martigues win 3–0, having been promoted to Championnat National next season. At the end of the 2021–22 season, he went on to make fourteen appearances and scoring once in all competitions. Following this, Abdou left the club and quietly announced his retirement from professional football.

== International career ==
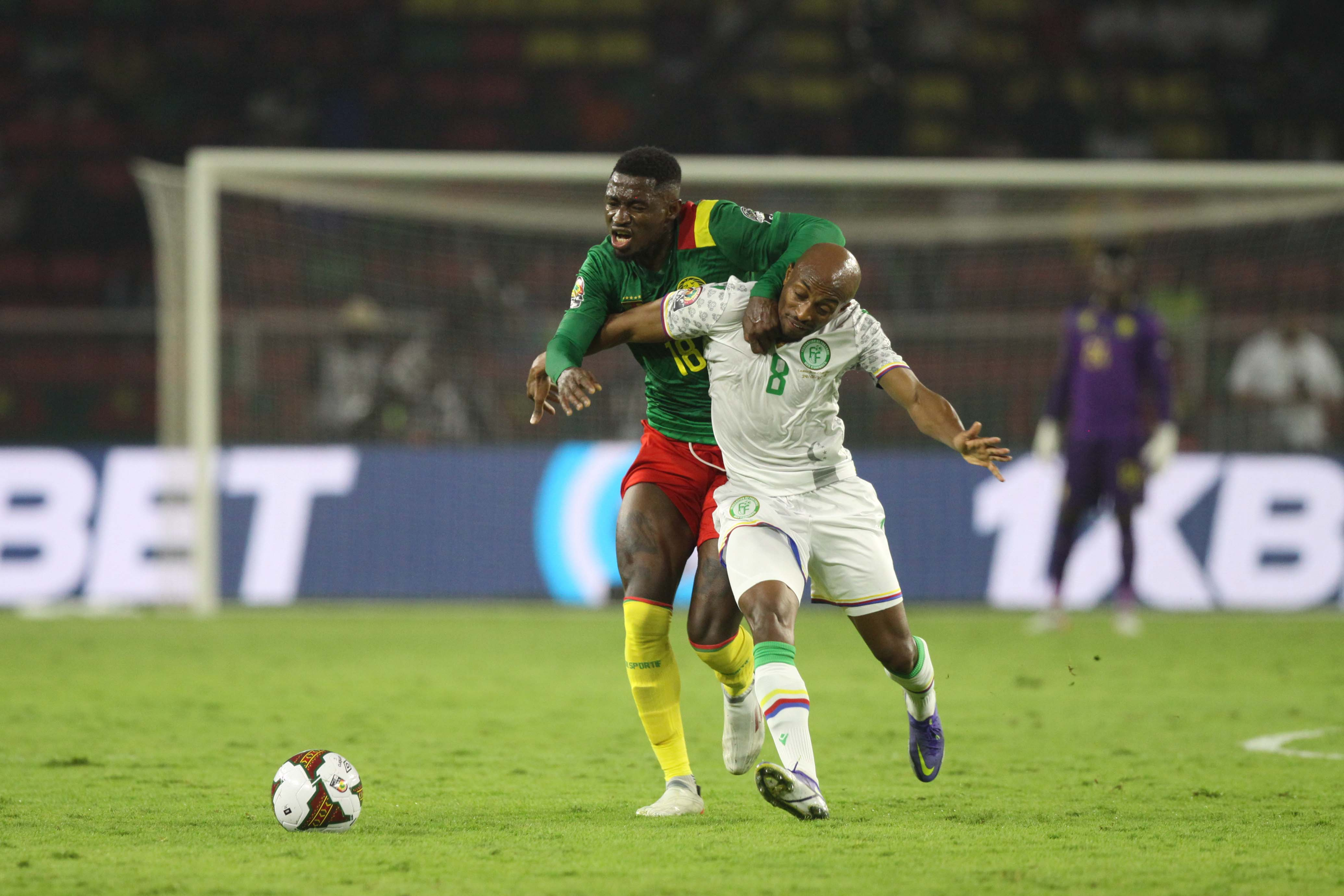
Abdou attempted to fend off the ball from Cameroon’s Martin Hongla in the Africa Cup of Nations’s round of sixteen.

Abdou is eligible to play for the Comoros national team through his parents and France. Throughout his international career at Comoros, Abdou said he was proud to represent the national side. Abdou reflected on how he was first called up, saying: "First of all, when I joined the selection in 2010, there were 7 expatriates if I remember correctly. Today we can still see the progress made and the commitment of all the people who feel concerned by our selection because it is the love of the motherland and the pride of going to represent our colors that motivate us before. all thing."

Abdou earned his first call up to the Comoros squad for an Africa Cup of Nations qualifier against Mozambique on 9 October 2010. He played the full match, which the national team lost 1–0 after conceding a goal in stoppage time. Abdou captained Comoros for the first time in his national team career when he played the whole game, as Comoros lost 1–0 against Mozambique in the World Cup qualification. In May 2014, Abdou was called up to the national team squad for the first time in three years and made his first appearance, starting the whole game, in a 1–0 loss against Kenya in the Africa Cup of Nations qualification on 18 May 2014. However, he played in the return leg, as Comoros drew 1–1, resulting in the national team elimination from the tournament. The following year, Abdou was called up to the Comoros squad and captained against Burkina Faso on 13 June 2015, as the national team lost 2–0.

In March 2016, Abdou was called up to the Comoros squad for the first time in six months and captained the national team, in a 1–0 win against Botswana in the Africa Cup of Nations qualification on 24 March 2016. He captained Comoros once by the end of the year, as the national team were eventually eliminated from the Group Stage.

Abdou captained Comoros in both legs against Mauritius in the African Cup Qualification, as the national team won 3–2 on aggregate. Following this, he began playing in either the centre–back position and right–back position by the end of the year. Abdou then featured four times in the Africa Cup of Nations qualification, as Comoros were eventually eliminated from the Group Stage. He then helped the national team keep three consecutive clean sheets between 12 October 2019 and 18 November 2019.

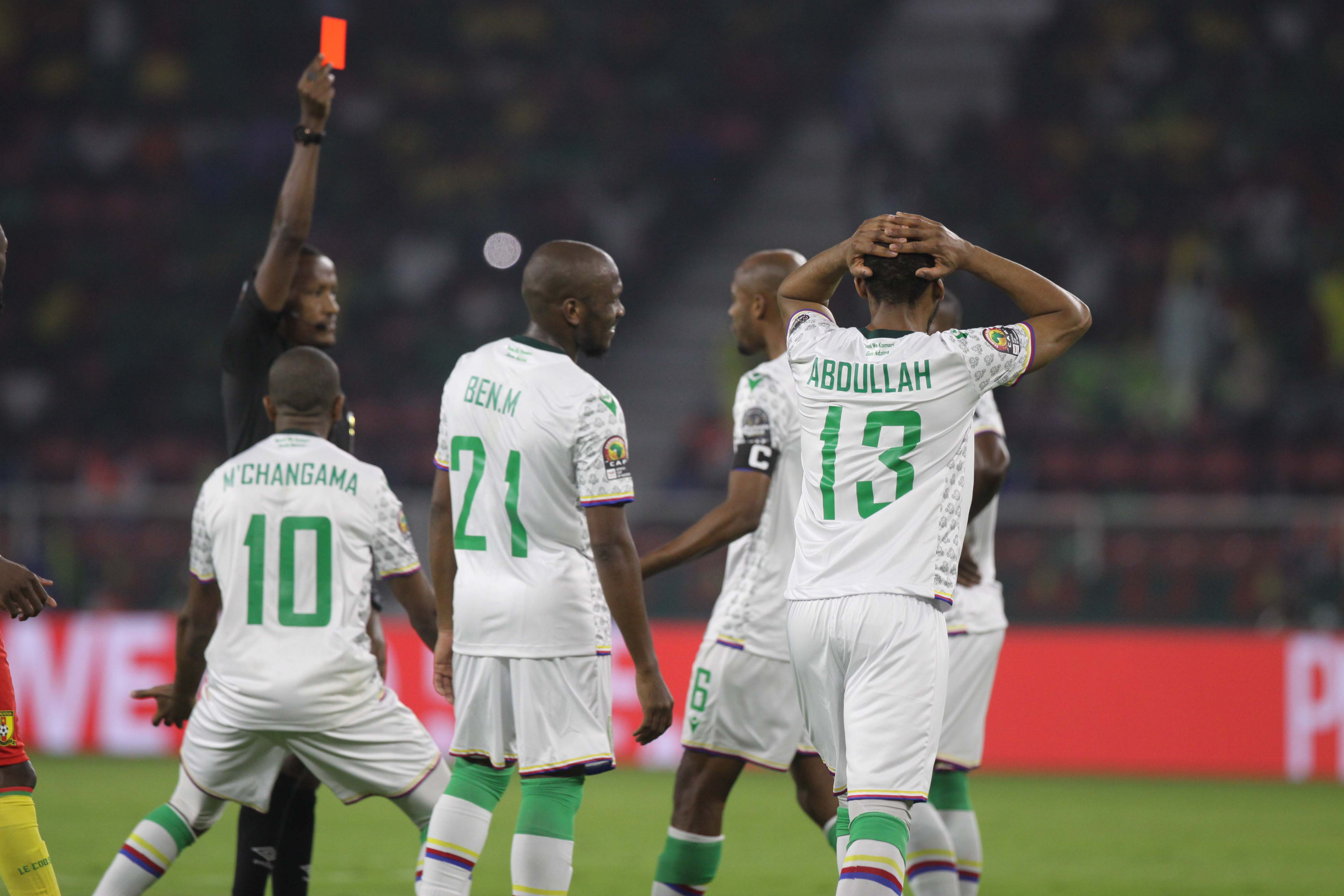
Abdou was shown a red card in the 7th minute, as his teammates reacted in shock and dismay during the match against Cameroon in the Africa Cup of Nations’ round of sixteen.

The following year, Abdou was called up to the Comoros squad for the first time in almost a year. He continued to resume his captain duty and played in both as a centre–back position to help the national team beat Kenya 3–1 on aggregate. On 23 December 2021, Abdou was included in the Comoros’ 26-man final squad for the Africa Cup of Nations. He made one start as captain, as the national team reached the knockout stage. However, in a round of sixteen match against Cameroon, Abdou received a straight red card in the 7th minute for a foul on Moumi Ngamaleu, as Comoros were eventually eliminated in the tournament, in what turns out to be his last appearance for the national team.

== Personal life ==
Abdou is married to his long–term girlfriend and now wife, Lucie, and together, they have three children, Ilyas, Inaya and Sohan. At one point, Abdou missed a match against Leeds United on 18 November 2012, due to returning to France for the birth of his daughter, Inaya. The following month, Abdou missed a match against Barnsley on 22 December 2012 as it revealed that he was given a compassionate leave to be with three-year-old Ilyas, who has been diagnosed with leukaemia, and his family in France.

In an interview with the Daily Mirror, Abdou revealed that he grew up supporting Marseille and mentioned that he has a sister. Abdou's brother was in Paris on 13 November 2015, a night when it was hit by a series of terror attacks. This led to Abdou's concerns of his brother's well–being, which he eventually picked up his call of his safety.

== Career statistics ==
As of match played 28 May 2022

Appearances and goals by club, season and competition
Club	Season	League			National Cup		League Cup		Other		Total	
Club	Season	Division	Apps	Goals	Apps	Goals	Apps	Goals	Apps	Goals	Apps	Goals
Martiques	2002–03	Ligue 2	26	1	0	0	0	0	—		26	1
Sedan	2003–04	Ligue 2	17	0	0	0	0	0	—		17	0
Sedan	2004–05	Ligue 2	32	2	0	0	0	0	—		32	2
Sedan	2005–06	Ligue 2	14	0	0	0	0	0	—		14	0
Sedan	2006–07	Ligue 1	17	0	0	0	0	0	—		17	0
Sedan	Total		80	2	0	0	0	0	—		80	2
Plymouth Argyle	2007–08	Championship	31	1	1	1	1	0	—		33	2
Millwall	2008–09	League One	36	3	2	0	1	0	4 (Note: One appearance in the Football League Trophy and three in the League One play-offs)	1	43	4
Millwall	2009–10	League One	43	1	5	0	1	0	4	0	53	1
Millwall	2010–11	Championship	34	0	1	0	1	0	—		36	0
Millwall	2011–12	Championship	40	0	2	0	3	0	—		45	0
Millwall	2012–13	Championship	39	1	5	0	1	0	—		45	1
Millwall	2013–14	Championship	24	0	1	0	2	0	—		27	0
Millwall	2014–15	Championship	33	1	2	0	2	0	—		37	1
Millwall	2015–16	League One	29	1	0	0	0	0	5 (Note: Two appearances in the Football League Trophy and three in the League One play-offs)	0	34	1
Millwall	2016–17	League One	12	0	2	0	2	0	6 (Note: Three appearances and a goal in the Football League Trophy, three appearances in the League One play-offs)	1	22	1
Millwall	Total		290	7	20	0	13	0	19	2	342	9
AFC Wimbledon (loan)	2017–18	League One	34	2	3	0	0	0	2	0	39	2
Martigues	2018–19	National 2	25	2	0	0	—		—		25	2
Martigues	2019–20	National 2	17	0	0	0	—		—		17	0
Martigues	2020–21	National 2	5	0	0	0	—		—		5	0
Martigues	2021–22	National 2	14	1	0	0	—		—		14	1
Martigues	Total		61	3	0	0	—		—		61	3
Career total			495	15	21	1	14	0	19	2	581	18

== Honours ==
Millwall

- Football/EFL League One play-offs: 2010, 2017

Martigues

- Championnat National 2: 2021–22

Individual

- Millwall Player of the Season: 2011–12, 2014–15
