= 2010–11 Millwall F.C. season =

Millwall
2010–11 season
- Chairman: John Berylson
- Manager: Kenny Jackett
- Championship: 9th
- FA Cup: 3rd round
- League Cup: 3rd round
- Top goalscorer: League: Steve Morison (15); All: Steve Morison (17)
- Highest home attendance: 16,724 vs Leeds United (9 April 2011)
- Lowest home attendance: 8,937 vs Scunthorpe United (4 December 2010)
- Average home league attendance: 12,438
Home colours	Away colours

The 2010–11 Championship season sees Millwall playing back in the second tier of English football, after a four-year absence. They secured promotion from League One via the Play-offs. This is Millwall's 85th season in the Football League and 36th in the second tier.

== Squad ==
As of 7 May 2011.

Note: Flags indicate national team as defined under FIFA eligibility rules; some limited exceptions apply. Players may hold more than one non-FIFA nationality.

No.	Pos.	Nation	Player
1	GK	IRL	David Forde
2	DF	IRL	Alan Dunne (vice-captain)
5	DF	ENG	Paul Robinson (captain)
6	MF	ENG	Liam Trotter
7	MF	ENG	Danny Schofield
8	MF	ALG	Hameur Bouazza
9	FW	ENG	Neil Harris
11	FW	ENG	Shaun Batt
12	MF	ENG	Chris Hackett
14	MF	ENG	James Henry
15	DF	ENG	Tony Craig
16	DF	ENG	Scott Barron
17	MF	ENG	Tamika Mkandawire

No.	Pos.	Nation	Player
18	DF	ENG	Darren Ward
20	FW	WAL	Steve Morison
21	DF	ENG	Jack Smith
22	FW	JAM	Kevin Lisbie (on loan from Ipswich Town)
23	GK	ENG	Steve Mildenhall
26	MF	COM	Jimmy Abdou
29	MF	ENG	Andros Townsend (on loan from Tottenham Hotspur)
30	FW	NIR	Josh McQuoid
32	FW	ENG	John Marquis
33	MF	ENG	Jake Gallagher
34	FW	IRL	Aiden O'Brien
35	DF	ENG	Darren Purse

=== No longer at Millwall ===
Note: Flags indicate national team as defined under FIFA eligibility rules; some limited exceptions apply. Players may hold more than one non-FIFA nationality.

No.	Pos.	Nation	Player
3	DF	ENG	Andy Frampton (on loan at Swindon Town)
4	MF	ENG	Darren Carter (loan from Preston North End ended)
4	MF	ENG	Craig Eastmond (loan from Arsenal ended through injury)
8	MF	ENG	Jason Puncheon (loan from Southampton ended)
10	FW	ENG	Lewis Grabban (on loan at Brentford)
13	GK	ENG	John Sullivan (on loan at Charlton Athletic)
19	FW	ENG	Ashley Grimes (on loan at Lincoln City)
25	FW	ENG	Theo Robinson (on loan at Derby County)

No.	Pos.	Nation	Player
27	DF	IRL	Pat O'Connor (at Hampton & Richmond Borough)
28	DF	NGA	Danny Shittu (left on a free transfer and then signed for QPR)
28	MF	IRL	Martin Rowlands (loan from Queens Park Rangers ended)
29	FW	ENG	Calvin Andrew (loan from Crystal Palace ended)
31	FW	ENG	Kiernan Hughes-Mason (on loan at Chelmsford City)
34	DF	DEN	Jens Berthel Askou (loan from Norwich City ended)

== Results ==
=== Results by round ===
Round	1	2	3	4	5	6	7	8	9	10	11	12	13	14	15	16	17	18	19	20	21	22	23	24	25	26	27	28	29	30	31	32	33	34	35	36	37	38	39	40	41	42	43	44	45	46
Ground	A	H	A	H	A	H	H	A	A	H	A	H	H	A	A	H	H	A	A	H	A	A	H	H	A	H	A	H	A	H	A	H	A	H	A	H	A	H	A	H	H	A	H	A	H	A
Result	W	W	L	W	D	D	L	L	D	D	W	L	W	L	L	D	L	W	D	W	D	D	W	W	D	W	L	W	L	W	D	L	L	D	L	W	W	D	W	W	D	L	W	W	L	L
Position	2	1	6	4	4	3	9	12	12	12	11	12	9	14	16	15	17	15	15	11	10	13	10	6	9	9	9	8	9	7	8	8	10	12	13	12	12	12	8	7	8	9	9	7	8	9

Updated to match(es) played on 7 May 2011. Source: Results
A = Away; H = Home; W = Win; D = Draw; L = Loss

=== League table ===
Pos	Team	Pld	W	D	L	GF	GA	GD	Pts
7	Leeds United	46	19	15	12	81	70	+11	72
8	Burnley	46	18	14	14	65	61	+4	68
9	Millwall	46	18	13	15	62	48	+14	67
10	Leicester City	46	19	10	17	76	71	+5	67
11	Hull City	46	16	17	13	52	51	+1	65

Updated to match(es) played on 7 May 2011. Source: The Football League
Rules for classification: 1) points; 2) goal difference; 3) number of goals scored.

=== Championship ===
==== August ====
7 Aug 2010	Bristol City	0–3	Millwall	Ashton Gate
15:00	Stewart (red card) 90'		Ward 42'; Schofield 48'; Robinson 60'; Carter (red card) 64'	Attendance: 18,308

14 Aug 2010	Millwall	4–0	Hull City	The Den
15:00	Morison 14', 52'; Lisbie 29'; Trotter 60'			Attendance: 13,292

21 Aug 2010	Leeds United	3–1	Millwall	Elland Road
15:00	Sam 32'; Somma 79', 90'		Naylor 14' (o.g.)	Attendance: 25,067

28 Aug 2010	Millwall	3–1	Coventry City	The Den
15:00	Cranie 17' (o.g.); Trotter 75'; Morison 79' (pen.)		Gunnarsson 60'; Baker (red card) 72'	Attendance: 11,688

==== September ====
11 Sep 2010	Nottingham Forest	1–1	Millwall	City Ground
15:00	Blackstock 80'		Morison 5'	Attendance: 23,342

14 Sep 2010	Millwall	0–0	Reading	The Den
19:45				Attendance: 11,061

18 Sep 2010	Millwall	1–6	Watford	The Den
15:00	Trotter 56'		Eustace 7'; Mutch 13'; Sordell 45'; Mariappa 54'; Graham 77'; M. Taylor 90'	Attendance: 12,562

25 Sep 2010	Cardiff City	2–1	Millwall	Cardiff City Stadium
15:00	Bothroyd 24'; Keogh 89'		Barron 10'; Trotter (red card) 40'	Attendance: 23,010

28 Sep 2010	Queens Park Rangers	0–0	Millwall	Loftus Road
19:45				Attendance: 15,325

==== October ====
02 Oct 2010	Millwall	1–1	Burnley	The Den
15:00	Barron 26'		Rodriguez 22'	Attendance: 12,330

16 Oct 2010	Crystal Palace	0–1	Millwall	Selhurst Park
15:00	Davis (red card) 90'		Robinson 53'	Attendance: 19,131

19 Oct 2010	Millwall	0–1	Portsmouth	The Den
19:45			Lawrence 78' (pen.)	Attendance: 12,095

23 Oct 2010	Millwall	2–0	Derby County	The Den
15:00	Morison 11'; Robinson 49'			Attendance: 12,024

30 Oct 2010	Ipswich Town	2–0	Millwall	Portman Road
15:00	Scotland 5'; Leadbitter 56' (pen.)			Attendance: 19,020

==== November ====
06 Nov 2010	Doncaster Rovers	2–1	Millwall	Keepmoat Stadium
15:00	Hayter 56'; Healy 58'		Morison 11'	Attendance: 10,356

09 Nov 2010	Millwall	1–1	Norwich City	The Den
19:45	Marquis 90'		Fox 75'	Attendance: 10,211

13 Nov 2010	Millwall	0–1	Sheffield United	The Den
15:00			Reid 29'	Attendance: 11,312

20 Nov 2010	Middlesbrough	0–1	Millwall	Riverside Stadium
15:00			Puncheon 25'	Attendance: 15,697

27 Nov 2010	Preston North End	0–0	Millwall	Deepdale
15:00				Attendance: 9,579

==== December ====
04 Dec 2010	Millwall	3–0	Scunthorpe United	The Den
15:00	Henry 23'; Morison 81', 86'			Attendance: 8,937

10 Dec 2010	Swansea City	1–1	Millwall	Liberty Stadium
19:45	Rangel 18'		Mkandawire 26'	Attendance: 13,853

26 Dec 2010	Portsmouth	1–1	Millwall	Fratton Park
13:00	Trotter 26'		Nugent 73'	Attendance: 17,521

28 Dec 2010	Millwall	2–0	Leicester City	The Den
15:00	Morison 12'; Puncheon 25'; Dunne (red card) 53'			Attendance: 12,188

==== January ====
1 Jan 2011	Millwall	3–0	Crystal Palace	The Den
13:30	Jason Puncheon 8', 65', 71'			Attendance: 16,170

3 Jan 2011	Derby County	0–0	Millwall	Pride Park
15:00				Attendance: 24,239

15 Jan 2011	Millwall	2–1	Ipswich Town	The Den
15:00	Schofield 45'; Morison 76'		Priskin 25'	Attendance: 12,112

22 Jan 2011	Leicester City	4–2	Millwall	Walkers Stadium
15:00	Dyer 8'; Yakubu 22'; Bamba 35', 74'		Henry 9'; Smith 69' (pen.); Askou (red card) 72'	Attendance: 23,347

28 Jan 2011	Millwall	2–0	Barnsley	The Den
19:45	Morison 17'; Henry 37'			Attendance: 10,087

==== February ====
01 Feb 2011	Norwich City	2–1	Millwall	Carrow Road
19:45	Ward 77'; Lansbury 90'		T. Robinson 56'	Attendance: 24,571

05 Feb 2011	Millwall	1–0	Doncaster Rovers	The Den
15:00	Lisbie 90+1'			Attendance: 11,427

12 Feb 2011	Sheffield United	1–1	Millwall	Bramall Lane
15:00	Bogdanović 77' (Pen.)		Lisbie 90'	Attendance: 19,793

19 Feb 2011	Millwall	2–3	Middlesbrough	The Den
15:00				Attendance: 11,871

22 Feb 2011	Reading	2–1	Millwall	Madejski Stadium
20:00				Attendance: 15,934

26 Feb 2011	Millwall	0–0	Nottingham Forest	The Den
15:00				Attendance: 14,226

==== March ====
5 March 2011	Watford	1–0	Millwall	Vicarage Road
15:00				Attendance: 13,539

8 March 2011	Millwall	2–0	Queens Park Rangers	The Den
19:45				Attendance: 14,104

12 March 2011	Burnley	0–3	Millwall	Turf Moor
15:00

19 March 2011	Millwall	3–3	Cardiff City	The Den
15:00				Attendance: 15,039

==== April ====
2 April 2011	Hull City	0–1	Millwall	KC Stadium
15:00			Morison 34'	Attendance: 19,852

9 April 2011	Millwall	3–2	Leeds United	The Den
15:00				Attendance: 16,724

12 April 2011	Millwall	0–0	Bristol City	The Den
19:45

16 April 2011	Coventry City	2–1	Millwall	Ricoh Arena
15:00

23 April 2011	Millwall	4–0	Preston North End	The Den
15:00

25 April 2011	Scunthorpe United	1–2	Millwall	Glanford Park
15:00

30 April 2011	Millwall	0–2	Swansea City	The Den
15:00				Attendance: 15,101

==== May ====
8 May 2011	Barnsley	1–0	Millwall	Oakwell
15:00

=== League Cup ===
==== First round ====
10 Aug 2010	Wycombe Wanderers	1–2	Millwall	Adams Park
19:45	Strevens 76'		Harris 26'; Dunne 105'	Attendance: 1,955

==== Second round ====
24 Aug 2010	Millwall	2–1	Middlesbrough	The Den
19:45	Morison 29' (pen.); Trotter 39'		McDonald 89'	Attendance: 6,704

==== Third round ====
21 Sep 2010	Millwall	1–2	Ipswich Town	The Den
19:45	Morison 62'		Priskin 23'; McAuley 45'	Attendance: 5,070

=== FA Cup ===
==== Third round ====
8 Jan 2011	Millwall	1–4	Birmingham City	The Den
15:00
