= 2016 Football League One play-off final =

Association football match between Barnsley and Millwall in 2016

- The match took place at Wembley Stadium.
Barnsley	Millwall
3	1
- Date: 29 May 2016
- Venue: Wembley Stadium, London
- Man of the Match: Adam Hammill (Barnsley)
- Referee: Stuart Attwell
- Attendance: 51,277
- Weather: Mild, overcast

The 2016 EFL League One play-off final was an association football match which was played on 29 May 2016 at Wembley Stadium, London, between Barnsley and Millwall to determine the third and final team to gain promotion from EFL League One to the EFL Championship. The top two teams of the 2015–16 Football League One season gained automatic promotion to the Championship, while the teams placed from third to sixth place in the table partook in play-off semi-finals; the winners of these semi-finals competed for the final place for the 2016–17 season in the Championship.

Both Barnsley and Millwall had won one and lost one of their previous play-off finals going into the match. A Wembley Stadium crowd of more than 51,000 people watched the game which was refereed by Stuart Attwell. Ashley Fletcher opened the scoring for Barnsley after two minutes, and seventeen minutes later Adam Hammill doubled the lead. Eleven minutes before half-time, Millwall's Mark Beevers halved the deficit, but a goal on seventy-four minutes from Lloyd Isgrove restored Barnsley's two-goal advantage which they maintained to the final whistle, winning 3–1 and earning promotion to the Championship. Violence at the Millwall end of the stadium disrupted the latter stages of the match.

Millwall ended the following season in sixth place in League One and were promoted to the Championship after winning the 2017 EFL Championship play-off final 1–0 against Bradford City. Barnsley's following season saw them finish in fourteenth place in the EFL Championship, seven points above the relegation zone and twenty-two points below the play-offs.

== Route to the final ==
Football League One final table, leading positions
Pos	Team	Pld	W	D	L	GF	GA	GD	Pts
1	Wigan Athletic	46	24	15	7	82	45	+37	87
2	Burton Albion	46	25	10	11	57	37	+20	85
3	Walsall	46	24	12	10	71	49	+22	84
4	Millwall	46	24	9	13	73	49	+24	81
5	Bradford City	46	23	11	12	55	40	+15	80
6	Barnsley	46	22	8	16	70	54	+16	74

Millwall finished the regular 2015–16 season in fourth place in Football League One, the third tier of the English football league system, two places ahead of Barnsley. Both therefore missed out on the two automatic places for promotion to the EFL Championship and instead took part in the play-offs to determine the third promoted team. Millwall finished four points behind Burton Albion (who were promoted in second place) and six behind league winners Wigan Athletic. Barnsley ended the season seven points behind Millwall.

Barnsley's opposition in their play-off semi-final was Walsall. The first leg was played at Barnsley's home ground, Oakwell. Jason Demetriou scored an own goal after he deflected Adam Hammill's shot into the Walsall net just before half-time. Sam Winnall then scored two second-half goals in two minutes to secure a 3–0 victory for Barnsley. The second leg, played at Walsall's Bescot Stadium, took place five days later. Hammill scored his third semi-final goal in the 18th minute before Ashley Fletcher's second half strike extended Barnsley's aggregate lead to 5–0. Jordan Cook scored a late consolation for Walsall but Josh Brownhill scored Barnsley's third of the game in the final minute to end the tie 6–1 on aggregate to Barnsley.

Millwall faced Bradford City in their play-off semi-final. The first leg was played at Bradford's home stadium, Valley Parade. Tony McMahon put the home team in the lead with a penalty early in the first half but Lee Gregory equalised two minutes later. Two further first-half goals, a header from Steve Morison and a free kick from Joe Martin, made the score 3–1 to Millwall. Despite Bradford having the majority of the possession, no further goals were scored in the second half. The second leg took place five days later at Millwall's home stadium, The Den. Gregory's 34th minute strike gave Millwall the lead, but Bradford's Jamie Proctor scored on his second attempt to bring the leg level. Bradford once again dominated possession but could not convert their limited chances and the match ended 1–1, ensuring Millwall of a 4–2 win on aggregate and progress to the play-off final.

Barnsley			Round	Millwall
Opponent	Result	Legs	Semi-finals	Opponent	Result	Legs
Walsall	6–1	3–0 home; 3–1 away		Bradford City	4–2	3–1 away; 1–1 home

== Match ==
=== Background ===
Millwall had featured in two play-off finals prior to this game. They lost the 2009 Football League One play-off final 3–2 to Scunthorpe United but triumphed the following season in the 2010 Football League One play-off final defeating Swindon Town 1–0. They had also played at Wembley in the 2012–13 FA Cup semi-final, losing to Wigan Athletic. Barnsley had also appeared in two play-off finals before this match. They lost 4–2 to Ipswich Town in the 2000 Football League First Division play-off final at the old Wembley Stadium and beat Swansea City in a penalty shootout to secure promotion in the 2006 Football League One play-off final at the Millennium Stadium. Barnsley had also already visited Wembley earlier in the season, with a 3–2 victory over Oxford United in the 2016 Football League Trophy Final. During the regular season, Barnsley won both matches against Millwall, 3–2 at The Den in August 2015 and 2–1 at Oakwell the following January. Winnall was Barnsley's highest scorer with 21 goals while Millwall's top marksman was Gregory, who was named in the League One team of the season, with 18. Millwall last played in the Championship during the previous season when they were relegated to League One after finishing in 22nd position. Barnsley had been relegated from the Championship in the 2013–14 season, ending their campaign in 23rd place. Bookmakers were divided as to who was considered the favourites to win the match.

The referee for this season's play-off final was Stuart Attwell, with assistants Nigel Lugg and Rob Jones, while Stephen Martin acted as the fourth official. Attwell had previously officiated at the 2008 Football League Two play-off final and had refereed the 2016 FA Vase Final at Wembley the previous weekend. Millwall supporters were seated in the West End of Wembley, while Barnsley fans were allocated the East End. The match was broadcast live in the UK on Sky Sports with highlights being shown on Channel 5. Both teams named an unchanged starting line-up from their semi-final second leg matches, but Millwall's Byron Webster did not complete the warm-up and was replaced by Tony Craig. The weather conditions for the match were mild and overcast.

=== First half ===
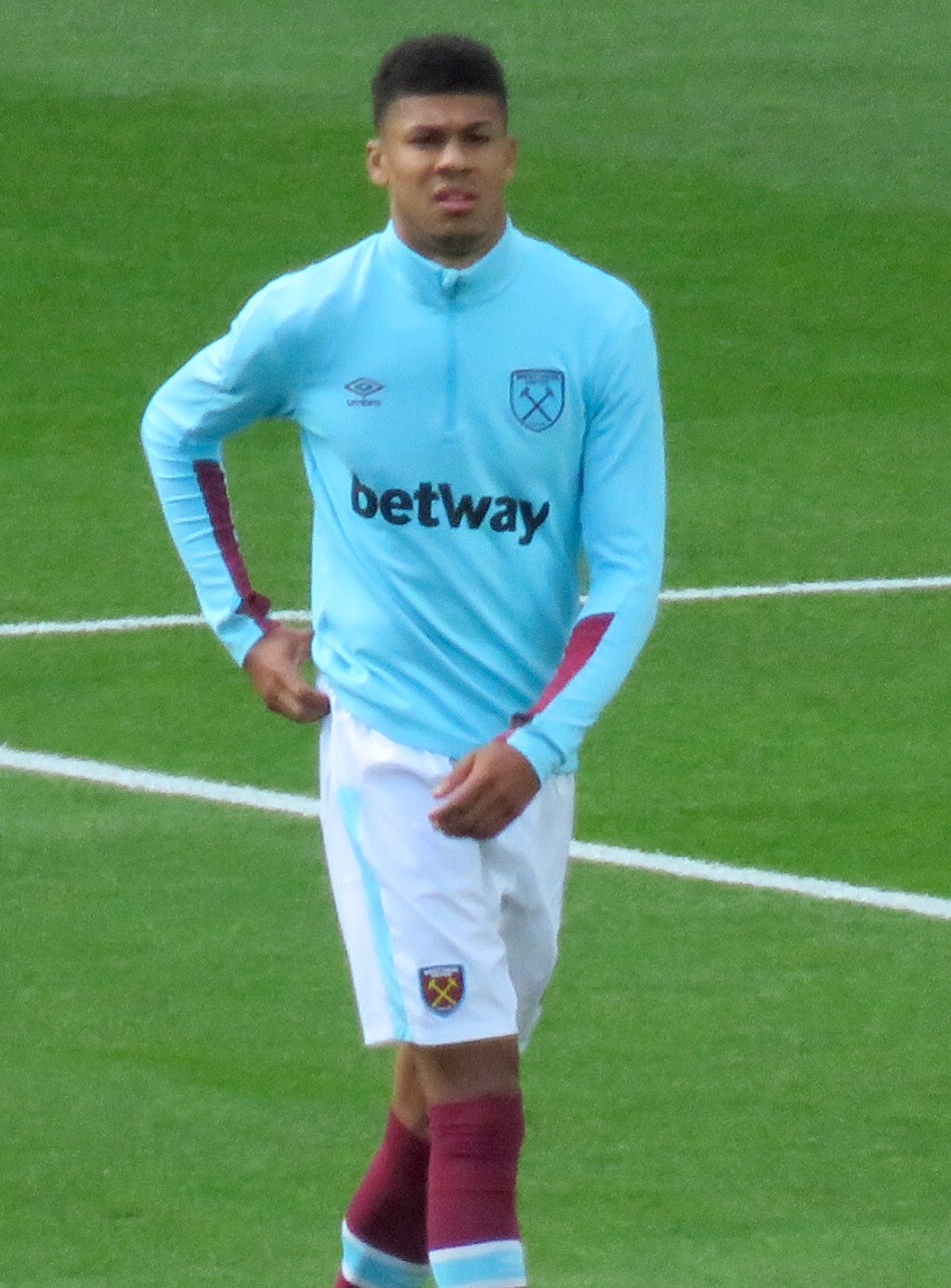
Ashley Fletcher (pictured warming up for West Ham United) scored the game's opening goal after two minutes.

Millwall kicked the match off around 3 p.m. in front of a Wembley crowd of 51,277. Shane Ferguson was fouled by Barnsley's Josh Scowen but Mark Beevers headed the resulting free kick from Taylor wide of the post. From the goal kick, Winnall's headed flick-on fell to Fletcher who ran into the box before shooting low past Archer to open the scoring. Hammill's fifth minute strike was too high and wide before Fletcher's shot was blocked by Archer. Conor Hourihane's subsequent low corner found Winnall whose attempt from 15 yards (14 m) was also blocked. On 19 minutes, Hammill doubled Barnsley's lead with a curling shot into the top corner of Millwall's goal from 25 yards (23 m). George Williams was shown the first yellow card of the match on 28 minutes when he fouled Millwall's Chris Taylor. The resulting free kick from Carlos Edwards was cleared by Winnall. Scowen then made two clearances in quick succession, first from Taylor and then Edwards. In the 34th minute, Millwall scored through Mark Beevers: a corner from Ferguson was kept in play at the near post by Morison, and Beevers held off Craig to strike the ball into Barnsley's net. In the 43rd minute, Martin became the first substitution of the game after sustaining a calf injury, and was replaced by the forward Aiden O'Brien. Brownhill's free kick in the last minute of the first half was off-target, and after three minutes of additional time, the referee brought the first half to a close with Barnsley leading 2–1.

=== Second half ===
No changes were made by either side during the break and Barnsley kicked off the second half. Millwall dominated the early stages of the second half but in the 56th minute, Hamill's double-chance was saved by Archer. Three minutes later, Gregory's chance was collected by Adam Davies before Hammill's 63rd minute strike was easily saved by Archer. Marc Roberts was then booked in the 63rd minute for a challenge on Gregory. Morison then went round the Barnsley goalkeeper and although his cross found O'Brien, the resulting shot was saved by Davies. In the 74th minute, Lloyd Isgrove extended Barnsley's lead. A corner from Hourihane was missed by Archer and Isgrove headed into the Millwall goal. Two minutes later, Fred Onyedinma was brought on for Ben Thompson, and in the 82nd minute, Edwards was replaced by Shaun Williams. Isgrove was then substituted by Marley Watkins before O'Brien's pass to Taylor ended in the latter's shot being saved by Davies. Four minutes of additional time were played but the score remained unchanged, with the match ending 3–1 in Barnsley's favour.

=== Details ===
29 May 2016
15:00

Barnsley	3–1	Millwall
Fletcher 2'; Hammill 19'; Isgrove 74'	Report	Beevers 34'

Wembley Stadium, London
Attendance: 51,277
Referee: Stuart Attwell

Barnsley	Millwall

GK	1	Adam Davies
RB	7	Josh Scowen
CB	26	Alfie Mawson
CB	4	Marc Roberts	(yellow card) 63'
LB	22	George Williams	(yellow card) 28'
RM	34	Lloyd Isgrove		(substituted off) 85'
CM	8	Conor Hourihane (c)
CM	11	Josh Brownhill
LM	20	Adam Hammill
RS	18	Ashley Fletcher		(substituted off) 81'
LS	9	Sam Winnall
Substitutes:
GK	13	Nick Townsend
DF	5	Lewin Nyatanga
DF	35	Aidy White
MF	12	Jak McCourt
MF	32	Harry Chapman
MF	15	Marley Watkins		(substituted in) 85'
FW	24	Ivan Toney		(substituted in) 81'
Manager:
Paul Heckingbottom

GK	13	Jordan Archer
RB	4	Carlos Edwards	(substituted off) 82'
CB	5	Tony Craig (c)
CB	16	Mark Beevers
LB	3	Joe Martin	(substituted off) 43'
RM	19	Chris Taylor
CM	26	Jimmy Abdou
CM	24	Ben Thompson	(substituted off) 76'
LM	18	Shane Ferguson
RS	9	Lee Gregory
LS	20	Steve Morison
Substitutes:
GK	1	David Forde
DF	15	Sid Nelson
MF	8	Ed Upson
MF	6	Shaun Williams	(substituted in) 82'
FW	22	Aiden O'Brien	(substituted in) 43'
FW	28	Jamie Philpot
MF	10	Fred Onyedinma	(substituted in) 76'
Manager:
Neil Harris

=== Statistics ===
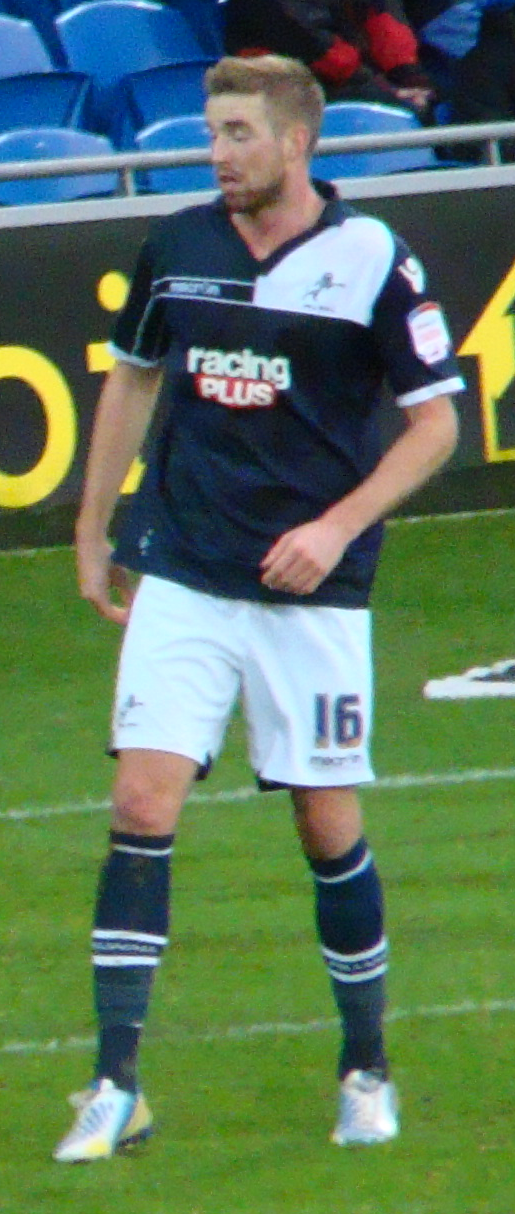
Mark Beevers (pictured in 2012) scored a consolation goal for Millwall.

Statistics
	Barnsley	Millwall
Possession	53%	47%
Goals scored	3	1
Shots on target	6	5
Shots off target	10	4
Fouls committed	10	9
Corner kicks	9	3
Yellow cards	2	0
Red cards	0	0

== Post-match ==
Barnsley interim manager Paul Heckingbottom said: "I couldn't be any prouder. Every single thing we've asked them to do, they've tried to do it. The players deserve every little bit of the celebrations." Millwall's manager Neil Harris suggested that the loss of Webster in the warm-up was a contributing factor to their defeat: "it affected us mentally before the game. You try to paper over it but we worked all work on our gameplan and it all sort of goes out of the way in the warm-up." Barnsley's Hammill was named man of the match. Towards the end of the game, with Barnsley winning 3–1, a group of Millwall supporters broke through a security barrier and attacked Barnsley supporters some of whom were forced to leave the stadium to avoid the violence. The fighting was condemned by the Football Association. Objects were also thrown on Barnsley supporters occupying a lower tier and were aimed at Barnsley players on the pitch.

Millwall ended the following season in sixth place in League One, thirteen points outside the two automatic promotion places, and were promoted to the Championship after winning the 2017 EFL Championship play-off final 1–0 against Bradford City. Barnsley's next season saw them finish in fourteenth place in the EFL Championship, seven points above the relegation zone and twenty-two points below the play-offs.
