= Steve Morison =

English footballer & manager (born 1983)

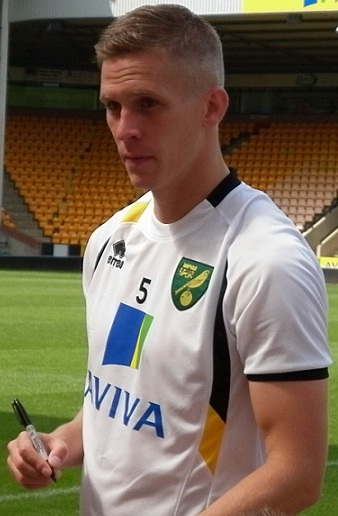
- Morison at Carrow Road in August 2012

Personal information
- Full name: Steven William Morison
- Date of birth: 29 August 1983 (age 43)
- Place of birth: Enfield, England
- Height: 6 ft 2 in (1.88 m)
- Position: Centre-forward

Youth career
- 1999–2001: Northampton Town

Senior career*
| Years | Team | Apps | (Gls) |
| 2001–2004 | Northampton Town | 24 | (3) |
| 2004–2006 | Bishop's Stortford | 58 | (28) |
| 2006–2009 | Stevenage Borough | 127 | (68) |
| 2009–2011 | Millwall | 83 | (35) |
| 2011–2013 | Norwich City | 53 | (10) |
| 2013–2015 | Leeds United | 41 | (5) |
| 2013–2014 | → Millwall (loan) | 41 | (8) |
| 2015–2019 | Millwall | 169 | (32) |
| 2019 | → Shrewsbury Town (loan) | 1 | (0) |
| 2019 | Shrewsbury Town | 6 | (0) |
| Total | | 603 | (190) |

International career
| 2006–2008 | England C | 8 | (3) |
| 2010–2012 | Wales | 20 | (1) |

Managerial career
- 2020–2021: Cardiff City U23s
- 2021–2022: Cardiff City
- 2023–2024: Hornchurch
- 2024–2025: Sutton United
- * Club domestic league appearances and goals

Steven William Morison (born 29 August 1983) is a professional football manager and former footballer who is loans manager at League One club Leicester City. He played as a centre-forward during a 19-year career, scoring 242 goals in 697 appearances.

Morison began his career at Northampton Town, making his first-team debut in 2002, before joining Conference South club Bishop's Stortford in November 2004. He signed for Stevenage Borough in August 2006, scoring the winning goal in the 2007 FA Trophy final, the first competitive cup final to be held at the new Wembley Stadium, and helped the club lift the trophy again in 2009. Across three seasons, he scored 86 goals in 151 appearances for Stevenage, which places him second on the club's all-time goalscoring list. He joined Millwall for £130,000 ahead of the 2009–10 season, contributing to their promotion to the Championship in his first season.

He signed for Premier League club Norwich City in June 2011 and later joined Leeds United in January 2013, spending a season back on loan at Millwall before rejoining permanently in August 2015. Morison scored the decisive goal in the 2017 League One play-off final as Millwall returned to the Championship. He finished his Millwall career with 92 goals in 343 appearances, placing him third on the club's all-time goalscoring list. He concluded his playing career at Shrewsbury Town, retiring in October 2019. Internationally, he earned 20 caps for Wales, scoring once, having previously represented England C, scoring three goals in eight appearances.

Following retirement, Morison obtained coaching qualifications, working with Northampton Town's under-18 team before joining Cardiff City as under-23 coach. He served briefly as Cardiff's caretaker manager before being appointed first-team manager in November 2021, a position he held until September 2022. He became manager of Hornchurch in June 2023 before taking charge of Sutton United in January 2024, leaving the role in September 2025. Morison joined Leicester City as a loans manager ahead of the 2026–27 season.

== Early life ==
Born in Enfield, London, Morison attended Enfield Grammar School, leaving school at the age of 16 with a single GCSE qualification. He subsequently earned a National Diploma in sports science.

== Club career ==
=== Northampton and Bishop's Stortford ===
Morison joined Northampton Town as part of the club's youth system following a successful trial period, having also spent time on trial at Leicester City. Upon turning 18, he signed a two-year professional contract with Northampton. He impressed manager Kevan Broadhurst and subsequently made his first-team debut at the end of the 2001–02 season, in a 2–2 draw against Cambridge United. The following season, Morison played a largely peripheral role as a substitute, making 15 appearances and scoring his first goal for Northampton in a 2–2 draw against Plymouth Argyle. He played just five times during the 2003–04 season, scoring once. He was offered a new six-month contract on 10 June 2004 and was informed by manager Colin Calderwood that he would need to prove his value to the team.

Morison played the opening five matches of the club's 2004–05 season but failed to score. He made two further appearances for the club, scoring Northampton's equaliser away at Darlington on 18 September 2004. The following month, Morison signed for Conference South club Bishop's Stortford for an undisclosed fee. He scored on his debut in a 1–1 draw against Redbridge. He helped Bishop's Stortford reach the semi-final of the FA Trophy and ended the season as both the club's top goalscorer and the 2004–05 FA Trophy leading goalscorer. In the following season, Morison initially struggled for form and was used primarily as a substitute during the first two months of the season. He returned to the starting line-up for a match against Histon in November 2005, scoring a hat-trick in a 5–0 victory. Morison scored 15 times over the course of the season.

=== Stevenage Borough ===
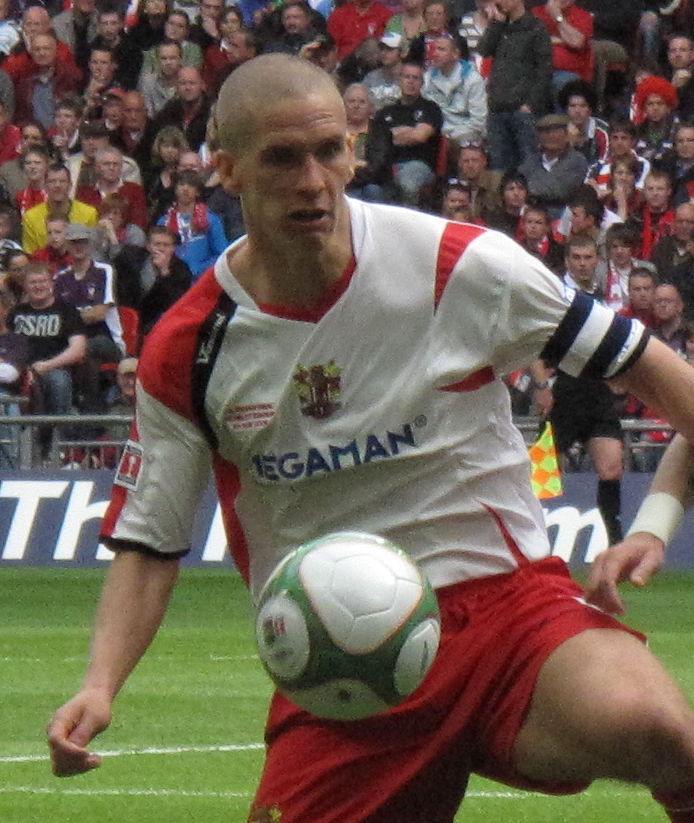
Morison captaining Stevenage

After opening the 2006–07 season by scoring two goals in two matches for Bishop's Stortford, Morison joined Conference National club Stevenage Borough on a two-year contract in August 2006 for a "small four figure fee". He scored on his debut in a 3–2 defeat against Crawley Town on 19 August 2006, and followed this up with a hat-trick against Morecambe in a 3–3 draw at Christie Park in the club's next fixture. Morison scored regularly during his debut season, contributing to the club's success in the FA Trophy, where he finished as the competition's top goalscorer with eight goals. This included scoring the winning goal in the final in May 2007 against Kidderminster Harriers, as Stevenage overturned a 2–0 deficit to win 3–2 at Wembley Stadium in front of a competition-record crowd of 53,262. Morison made 53 appearances during the season, scoring 34 times in all competitions and finishing as the club's leading goalscorer.

Morison maintained his goalscoring form throughout Stevenage's 2007–08 season, scoring 22 goals in 43 appearances, as the club narrowly missed out on the Conference Premier play-offs. At the end of the season, Morison submitted a transfer request as he sought a return to the Football League. Although the club accepted the request and received interest from League Two club Crewe Alexandra, no transfer materialised, and Morison subsequently signed a new three-year contract with Stevenage. The contract contained a clause allowing him to leave the club at the end of the 2008–09 season for a pre-agreed fee, should Stevenage fail to achieve promotion to the Football League.

He scored 30 goals in 51 appearances for the Hertfordshire club during the 2008–09 season, and captained the team for the majority of the season. His season began with a 5–0 away defeat to Wrexham, a match in which Morison was sent off for an "off-the-ball headbutt". He missed the following three games through suspension, but returned in early September 2008, scoring a hat-trick against eventual champions Burton Albion and two goals against Altrincham in successive matches. Morison also scored seven times in seven games in the FA Trophy that season, including one in the 2–0 victory against York City in the final on 9 May 2009. During his three-year spell at the club, Morison made 152 appearances and scored 89 goals. This tally ranks him as the second-highest goalscorer in the club's history. Morison was also included in the club's 'Wall of Fame', which recognises "the six greatest players in Stevenage's history as voted for by the club's supporters".

=== Millwall ===
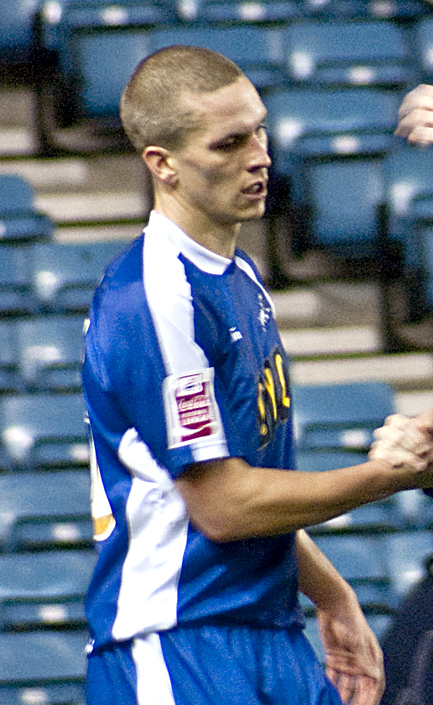
Morison whilst playing for Millwall in 2009

Stevenage failed to achieve promotion to League Two, thereby activating a release clause in his contract. He was permitted to leave the club and, shortly thereafter, agreed personal terms with League One club Millwall on 15 May 2009, with a transfer fee of £130,000 being agreed. Morison made his debut for Millwall in the opening match of the 2009–10 season, starting in a 1–1 draw with Southampton on 8 August 2009, during which he provided the assist for Millwall's equaliser. A month later, he scored his first goal for the club in a 3–1 victory against Huddersfield Town. After scoring seven goals in five matches in March 2010, Morison was named Football League One Player of the Month. He scored in Millwall's 2–0 win against Huddersfield Town on 18 May 2010, his 23rd goal of the season, as Millwall progressed to the League One play-off final, where they defeated Swindon Town 1–0 at Wembley Stadium on 6 June 2010. The victory marked Morison's third successive win at the stadium. He scored 23 goals in 52 appearances during his debut season at Millwall

Morison celebrating his 14th goal of the season in a 2–0 win over league leaders QPR

Morison began the 2010–11 season by assisting two of Millwall's goals in a 3–0 victory over Bristol City at Ashton Gate on 7 August 2010. In the club's following league match, he scored two headed goals as Millwall defeated Hull City at The Den. It was reported that Millwall rejected a £2 million offer for Morison from Nottingham Forest on 15 October 2010, with Millwall manager Kenny Jackett stating there would be "no chance" that Morison will be sold in the January transfer window. A day later, Jackett clarified that the club had not received a formal bid for Morison from Forest. Morison subsequently signed a new 2 1/2-year contract with Millwall on 5 February 2011, ending transfer speculation regarding his long-term commitment to the club. Morison concluded the season having scored 17 goals in 43 appearances.

=== Norwich City ===
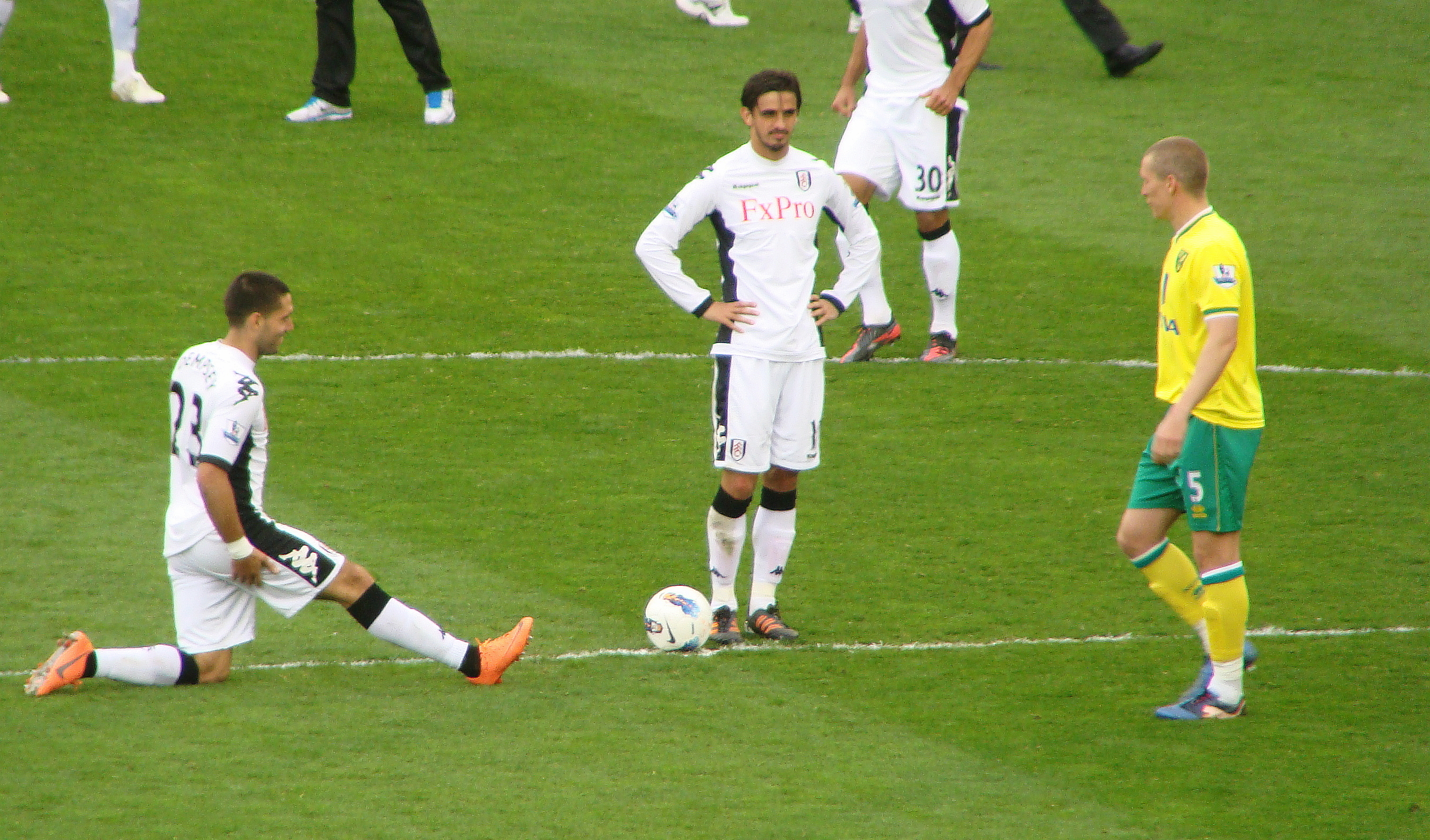
Morison (right) playing for Norwich against Fulham

At the end of the 2010–11 season, Morison submitted a written transfer request amid speculation linking him to a move to newly promoted Premier League club Norwich City. Millwall rejected the request. A day later, Morison stated: "Norwich have made a couple of bids that have been turned down so I've done what I've done. I want to play in the Premier League, I might not get another opportunity". Millwall subsequently accepted an offer from Norwich after the two clubs agreed a fee for the player on 2 June 2011. It was the fourth bid Norwich had submitted for Morison. He signed for the club on a three-year contract for an undisclosed fee on 6 June 2011.

Morison made his Norwich City debut against Wigan Athletic during the club's opening match of the 2011–12 season, playing 75 minutes in a 1–1 draw and providing the assist for Norwich's equalising goal. He scored his first goal for the club in Norwich's first home win of the season, a 2–1 victory over Sunderland on 26 September 2011. He scored his 10th goal of the season in a 3–3 draw away to Arsenal at the Emirates Stadium on 5 May 2012. Morison's late goal from a tight angle drew Norwich level after they had trailed 3–2 with five minutes remaining. During his first season at the club, he scored 10 goals in 37 appearances.

The following season, under new Norwich manager Chris Hughton, Morison featured predominantly as a substitute, starting only four matches during the first half of the 2012–13 season. He scored his first goal of the season in a 5–2 home defeat to Liverpool on 29 September 2012, a match in which he was named in the starting line-up. Morison made his final appearance for Norwich in a 4–3 defeat to Manchester City in the club's last match of 2012. He made 59 appearances during his one-and-a-half-year spell at the club, scoring 12 goals.

=== Leeds United ===
On the final day of the 2013 January transfer window, Morison signed for Championship club Leeds United as part of a swap deal. The transfer involved Luciano Becchio moving to Norwich, with Norwich also paying Leeds a "further undisclosed sum". Upon Morison's arrival, Leeds manager Neil Warnock stated: "Steve meets all the requirements of the striker we've been looking to bring in. For me, he is a player who has everything. He can score goals from anywhere, whether it's 25 yards or a tap-in, he has pace, and he has all the attributes you want".

Morison made his Leeds United debut on 9 February 2013, playing the full match in the club's 2–2 draw against Wolverhampton Wanderers at Molineux. He scored his first goal for the club on his home debut on 20 February 2013, the second goal in a 2–0 victory over Blackpool. He scored three goals in 16 appearances during the second half of the 2012–13 season.

==== Millwall loan ====
A day after returning for pre-season training with Leeds, on 28 June 2013, Morison rejoined former club Millwall, also of the Championship, on a season-long loan deal. Upon his return, he stated: "I'm pleased to be back here. If anybody has any doubts about me all I'd say is that I aim to score plenty of goals for Millwall and help this club to greater success". Morison made 41 appearances during the loan agreement, of which 25 were starting, and scored eight times as Millwall finished 19th in the Championship.

==== Return to Leeds ====
Morison returned to Leeds United following the conclusion of his loan spell, with new Leeds chairman Massimo Cellino stating Morison was part of manager Dave Hockaday's plans for the 2014–15 season, but that "he needs to show if he's still a good player because he used to be". Morison missed the opening matches of the season through injury, making his first league appearance for Leeds in over a year as a substitute against Huddersfield Town on 20 September 2014. He scored his first goal for Leeds in more than two years with a volley in a 2–1 defeat to Charlton Athletic on 19 April 2015. He made 26 appearances during the season, scoring twice.

=== Rejoining Millwall permanently ===
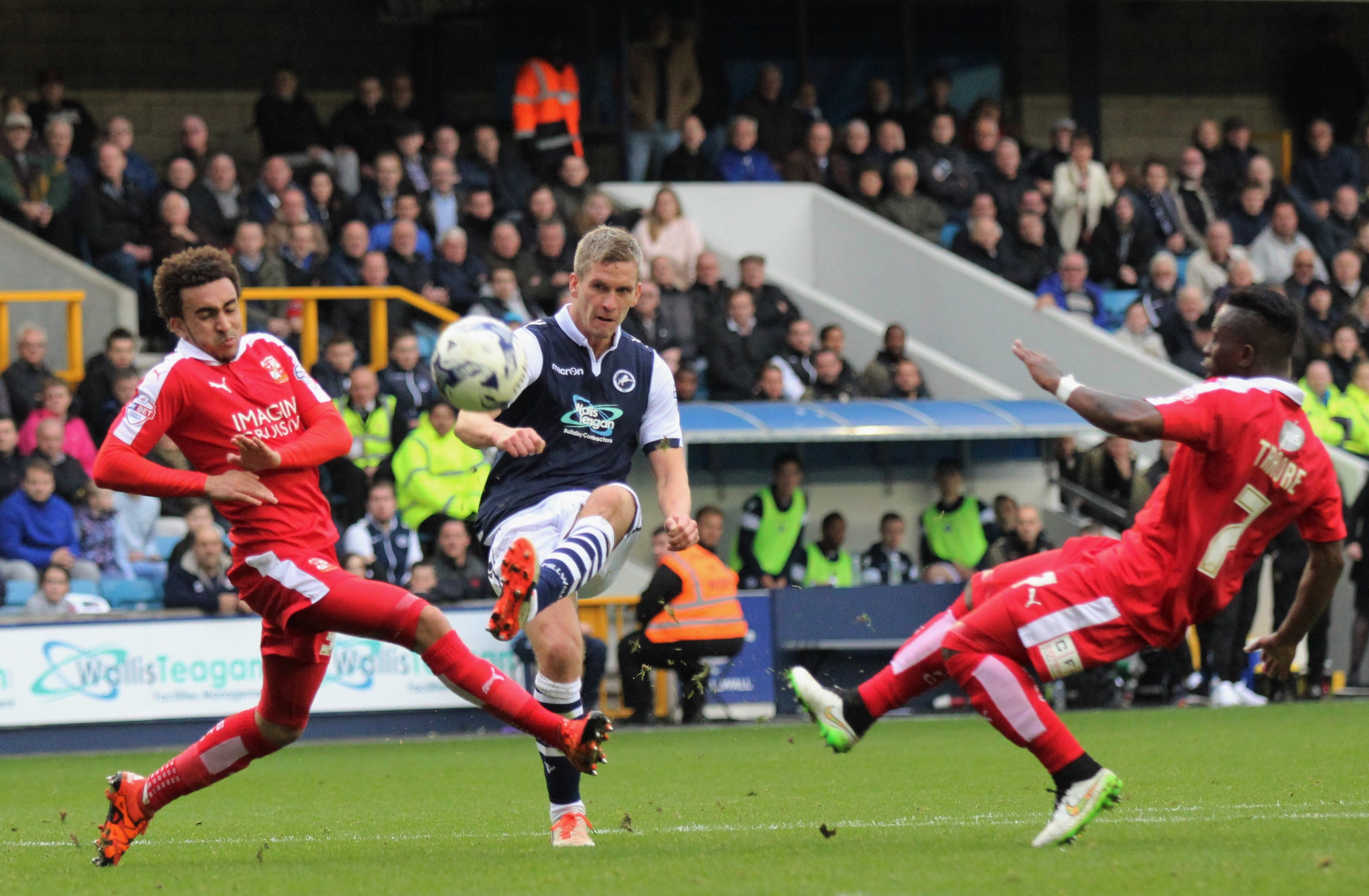
Morison (wearing blue) playing against Swindon Town in 2015, during his third spell at Millwall

Morison rejoined League One club Millwall for a third spell on 4 August 2015, signing on a permanent basis for an undisclosed fee. He scored in the first game upon returning, a 2–1 victory over Shrewsbury Town on 8 August 2015. Morison scored 19 goals in 57 appearances during the season, as Millwall were defeated 3–1 in the 2016 Football League One play-off final on 29 May 2016.

Morison began the 2016–17 season by scoring six goals in eight matches. He made 50 appearances over the course of the season, scoring 19 times. This included three goals in the League One play-offs, as well as the decisive goal in the 2017 EFL League One play-off final as Millwall secured promotion back to the Championship. Morison's goal, a volley scored in the 85th minute, was the only goal of the game, as Millwall defeated Bradford City at Wembley Stadium on 20 May 2017.

Morison triggered an appearance-based clause in his contract on 14 December 2017, resulting in an automatic extension until 2019. He made 48 appearances during the 2017–18 season, scoring five goals, as Millwall consolidated their position in the Championship, finishing in eighth place in their first season back at that level. During the 2018–19 season, Morison scored once in 44 appearances. Across his three spells with Millwall, he made 343 appearances and scored 92 goals in all competitions, placing him third in the club's all-time goalscoring list.

=== Shrewsbury Town ===
An initial season-long loan move to League One club Shrewsbury Town was agreed on 19 June 2019, playing under Shrewsbury manager Sam Ricketts, who he had played alongside for Wales. He made his competitive debut for the club on 3 August 2019, starting in a 1–0 home victory against Portsmouth. The loan agreement was made permanent on 8 August 2019 and was set to run until the end of the 2019–20 season. He made nine appearances for Shrewsbury during the opening months of the 2019–20 season. Morison announced his retirement from playing with immediate effect on 18 October 2019, in order to begin his coaching career at the academy of his first club, Northampton Town.

== International career ==
=== England C ===
Morison was called up to the England C team, who represent England at non-League level, in November 2006. He scored in a European Challenge Trophy match against the Netherlands and also featured in matches against Grenada and Barbados, scoring against Grenada in a 1–1 draw. Morison played eight times for the England C team, scoring three goals, before becoming ineligible due to age restrictions.

=== Wales ===
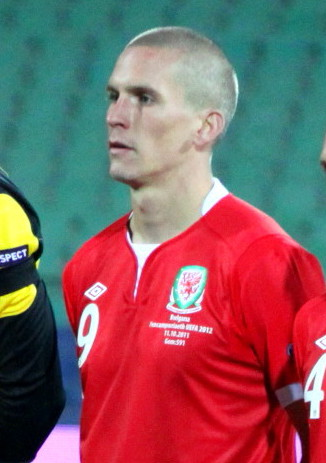
Morison in Wales colours

In May 2010, Morison was identified as eligible to represent Wales due to Welsh ancestry, as his grandmother was born in Tredegar, near Ebbw Vale. Wales assistant manager Roy Evans attended Millwall's 1–0 victory against Swindon Town to observe Morison, who had expressed interest in playing for Wales. Subsequently, in July 2010, Wales manager John Toshack included Morison in the squad for a friendly against Luxembourg in Llanelli on 11 August 2010. Morison started in Wales' 5–1 victory, playing the full match and providing the assist for Ashley Williams' goal.

Wales manager Gary Speed called Morison up for the country's two UEFA Euro 2012 qualifiers in September 2011. He scored his first international goal in a 2–1 victory against Montenegro, played at Cardiff City Stadium on 2 September 2011. Morison's goal, a close-range finish from six yards, proved decisive in Wales earning their first victory of the qualification group. He earned his 20th and final cap in a 2–0 defeat to Croatia in Osijek on 16 October 2012.

== Coaching career ==
Morison earned his first coaching qualification at Protec Football Academy during his playing career. He later obtained his UEFA Pro Licence and, following his retirement in October 2019, began coaching within the academies of former clubs Northampton Town and Millwall.

=== Cardiff City ===
Morison was appointed lead coach of the Cardiff City under-23 team on 10 February 2020. The appointment reunited him with Cardiff manager Neil Harris, who had both played alongside him and managed him at Millwall. Following the dismissal of Mick McCarthy in October 2021, Morison was placed in temporary charge of the first team. His first match as caretaker manager was a 3–3 draw away at Stoke City, with Cardiff recovering from a 3–0 deficit in the final 25 minutes; the result ended Cardiff's club-record run of eight consecutive defeats. Cardiff recorded their first win in 10 matches in Morison's third match in caretaker charge, defeating Huddersfield Town 2–1 on 6 November 2021.

Club owner Vincent Tan stated that he had been impressed by the more attacking style of football implemented during Morison's three matches as caretaker manager. Morison was subsequently appointed first-team manager on 12 November 2021, signing a contract until the end of the 2021–22 season. He drew criticism for his treatment of players following a 3–0 defeat to Bournemouth on 30 December 2021, later acknowledging he had been "too honest" when talking about players in his post-match interviews. Morison signed a contract extension on 2 March 2022, until the summer of 2023, after leading the team clear of the relegation places and impressing the board of directors with "a progressive and clearly identifiable playing style". He was named EFL Championship Manager of the Month for March 2022 after Cardiff won three matches and remained unbeaten throughout the month. Cardiff finished the season in 18th place, 16 points above the relegation places. The club signed 17 new players ahead of the 2022–23 season, but began the season with only three wins from their opening 10 league games. Morison was dismissed by Cardiff on 18 September 2022, with the club positioned in 18th place in the Championship.

=== Hornchurch ===
Having held talks with Cardiff City about a return to the club, Morison was appointed as manager of Isthmian League Premier Division club Hornchurch on 8 June 2023. Hornchurch led the Isthmian League Premier Division during the first half of the 2023–24 season, recording 16 victories, five draws and one defeat in Morison's 22 league matches in charge. Following Hornchurch's 1–1 home draw against Horsham on 6 January 2024, Morison announced his departure to Hornchurch supporters in the clubhouse, confirming that he was taking on the managerial position at Sutton United. Hornchurch chairman Alex Sharp stated: "I'm disappointed to confirm that Steve will be leaving us after six months, following probably the most impressive first half of a season we have ever seen".

=== Sutton United ===
Morison was appointed manager of League Two last-placed club Sutton United on 6 January 2024. His first match in charge was a 2–2 draw with promotion-chasing Barrow on 13 January 2024. Under Morison's management, Sutton's form improved, with the club winning four consecutive matches to briefly move out of the relegation zone for the first time since August 2023. However, they were relegated following a 4–4 draw with Milton Keynes Dons on the final match of the season. Following the relegation, Morison stated that he was "not going anywhere", and led Sutton to a 12th-place finish in the National League in 2024–25. After one win from nine matches at the start of the 2025–26 season, he left the club by mutual consent on 17 September 2025.

Morison joined Leicester City as a loans manager ahead of the 2026–27 season, overseeing the club's loan programme and the development of academy players.

== Style of play ==
Morison played as a striker and was noted for his positional awareness, having been described as a "player who is always in the right place at the right time". Prior to the 2008–09 season, Stevenage manager Graham Westley sent Morison to a specialised training camp to improve his acceleration and agility. Westley also characterised Morison as a player that "no defender would want to play against", citing his combination of height, pace, and strength. In May 2010, Millwall manager Kenny Jackett highlighted Morison's physical attributes, describing him as a "physical threat" with notable aerial ability and stating that he "has a lot of strength and pace, which he uses on defenders perfectly". Nick Szczepanik of The Times described Morison as playing with "a fearless, all-action style".

== Personal life ==
While playing part-time football for Bishop's Stortford in 2004, Morison was employed by a shredding company, describing the role as "getting up at four in the morning shredding paper around London". He later stated that he "could not handle the early starts" and subsequently took a job in office administration, which he described as "an easier job indoors". It was during this period that he met his wife; they later had a son. He left the role in administration immediately after signing for Stevenage in August 2006.

Morison has maintained a long-standing interest in greyhound racing, which began during his childhood visits to Walthamstow Stadium. In January 2013, he co-founded a greyhound racing syndicate with former Norwich City teammate Grant Holt.

== Career statistics ==
=== Club ===
Appearances and goals by club, season and competition
| Club | Season | League | | | FA Cup | | League Cup | | Other | | Total | |
| Club | Season | Division | Apps | Goals | Apps | Goals | Apps | Goals | Apps | Goals | Apps | Goals |
|---|---|---|---|---|---|---|---|---|---|---|---|---|
| Northampton Town | 2001–02 | Second Division | 1 | 0 | 0 | 0 | 0 | 0 | 0 | 0 | 1 | 0 |
| Northampton Town | 2002–03 | Second Division | 13 | 1 | 0 | 0 | 0 | 0 | 2 (Note: Appearances in Football League Trophy) | 0 | 15 | 1 |
| Northampton Town | 2003–04 | Third Division | 5 | 1 | 0 | 0 | 0 | 0 | 0 | 0 | 5 | 1 |
| Northampton Town | 2004–05 | League Two | 5 | 1 | 0 | 0 | 2 | 0 | 0 | 0 | 7 | 1 |
| Northampton Town | Total | | 24 | 3 | 0 | 0 | 2 | 0 | 2 | 0 | 28 | 3 |
| Bishop's Stortford | 2004–05 | Conference South | 23 | 11 | 1 | 1 | — | | 7 (Note: Appearances in FA Trophy) | 9 | 31 | 21 |
| Bishop's Stortford | 2005–06 | Conference South | 33 | 15 | 3 | 2 | — | | 3 | 3 | 39 | 20 |
| Bishop's Stortford | 2006–07 | Conference South | 2 | 2 | — | | — | | 0 | 0 | 2 | 2 |
| Bishop's Stortford | Total | | 58 | 28 | 4 | 3 | 0 | 0 | 10 | 12 | 72 | 43 |
| Stevenage Borough | 2006–07 | Conference Premier | 43 | 24 | 2 | 2 | — | | 8 | 8 | 53 | 34 |
| Stevenage Borough | 2007–08 | Conference Premier | 43 | 22 | 3 | 0 | — | | 1 | 0 | 47 | 22 |
| Stevenage Borough | 2008–09 | Conference Premier | 41 | 22 | 3 | 1 | — | | 7 | 7 | 51 | 30 |
| Stevenage Borough | Total | | 127 | 68 | 8 | 3 | 0 | 0 | 16 | 15 | 151 | 86 |
| Millwall | 2009–10 | League One | 43 | 20 | 5 | 2 | 1 | 0 | 3 (Note: Appearances in 2010 League One play-offs) | 1 | 52 | 23 |
| Millwall | 2010–11 | Championship | 40 | 15 | 1 | 0 | 2 | 2 | 0 | 0 | 43 | 17 |
| Millwall | Total | | 83 | 35 | 6 | 2 | 3 | 2 | 3 | 1 | 95 | 40 |
| Norwich City | 2011–12 | Premier League | 34 | 9 | 2 | 1 | 1 | 0 | 0 | 0 | 37 | 10 |
| Norwich City | 2012–13 | Premier League | 19 | 1 | 0 | 0 | 3 | 1 | 0 | 0 | 22 | 2 |
| Norwich City | Total | | 53 | 10 | 2 | 1 | 4 | 1 | 0 | 0 | 59 | 12 |
| Leeds United | 2012–13 | Championship | 15 | 3 | 1 | 0 | 0 | 0 | 0 | 0 | 16 | 3 |
| Leeds United | 2014–15 | Championship | 26 | 2 | 0 | 0 | 0 | 0 | 0 | 0 | 26 | 2 |
| Leeds United | Total | | 41 | 5 | 1 | 0 | 0 | 0 | 0 | 0 | 42 | 5 |
| Millwall (loan) | 2013–14 | Championship | 41 | 8 | 1 | 0 | 0 | 0 | 0 | 0 | 42 | 8 |
| Millwall (loan) | Total | | 41 | 8 | 1 | 0 | 0 | 0 | 0 | 0 | 42 | 8 |
| Millwall | 2015–16 | League One | 46 | 15 | 2 | 1 | 1 | 1 | 8 (Note: Five appearances in Football League Trophy; three appearances in 2016 League One play-offs) | 2 | 57 | 19 |
| Millwall | 2016–17 | League One | 38 | 11 | 5 | 2 | 2 | 1 | 5 (Note: Two appearances in Football League Trophy; three appearances in 2017 League One play-offs) | 5 | 50 | 19 |
| Millwall | 2017–18 | Championship | 44 | 5 | 3 | 0 | 1 | 0 | 0 | 0 | 48 | 5 |
| Millwall | 2018–19 | Championship | 41 | 1 | 3 | 0 | 0 | 0 | 0 | 0 | 44 | 1 |
| Millwall | Total | | 169 | 32 | 13 | 3 | 4 | 2 | 13 | 7 | 199 | 44 |
| Millwall | Millwall totals | | 293 | 75 | 20 | 5 | 7 | 4 | 16 | 8 | 343 | 92 |
| Shrewsbury Town | 2019–20 | League One | 7 | 0 | 0 | 0 | 1 | 0 | 1 (Note: Appearance in EFL Trophy) | 0 | 9 | 0 |
| Career totals | | | 603 | 190 | 35 | 12 | 14 | 5 | 45 | 35 | 697 | 242 |

=== International ===
| National team | Season | Apps | Goals |
|---|---|---|---|
| Wales | 2010–11 | 7 | 0 |
| Wales | 2011–12 | 8 | 1 |
| Wales | 2012–13 | 5 | 0 |
| Total | | 20 | 1 |

=== International goals ===
Wales' goal tally first

| # | Date | Venue | Opponent | Score | Result | Competition |
|---|---|---|---|---|---|---|
| 1. | 2 September 2011 | Cardiff City Stadium, Cardiff, Wales | Montenegro | 1 – 0 | 2–1 | Euro 2012 qualifier |

=== Managerial statistics ===
As of match played 16 September 2025

Managerial record by team and tenure
| Team | From | To | Record | | | | | Ref. |
| Team | From | To | P | W | D | L | Win % | Ref. |
|---|---|---|---|---|---|---|---|---|
| Cardiff City | 23 October 2021 | 18 September 2022 | 45 | 16 | 8 | 21 | 35.56 | |
| Hornchurch | 8 June 2023 | 6 January 2024 | 27 | 18 | 7 | 2 | 66.67 | |
| Sutton United | 6 January 2024 | 17 September 2025 | 91 | 27 | 29 | 35 | 29.67 | |
| Total | | | 163 | 61 | 44 | 58 | 37.42 | — |

== Honours ==
=== As a player ===
Stevenage Borough

- FA Trophy: 2006–07, 2008–09

Millwall

- Football League One play-offs: 2010, 2017

Individual

- Stevenage Player of the Year: 2007–08
- Football League One Player of the Month: March 2010
- Millwall Player of the Year: 2016–17

=== As a manager ===
Individual

- EFL Championship Manager of the Month: March 2022
