= 2008–09 Gillingham F.C. season =

English football club season

Gillingham
2008–09 season
- Chairman: Paul Scally
- Manager: Mark Stimson
- League Two: 5th (promoted via play-offs)
- FA Cup: Third round
- League Cup: First round
- League Trophy: First round
- Top goalscorer: League: Simeon Jackson (20); All: Simeon Jackson (21)
- Highest home attendance: 10,107 vs Aston Villa (4 January 2009)
- Lowest home attendance: 1,557 vs Colchester United (7 October 2008)
Home colours	Away colours	Third colours

The 2008–09 season was the seventy-seventh season in which football club Gillingham F.C. competed in the Football League, and the fifty-ninth since the club's return to the League in 1950. Gillingham finished the season in fifth place in Football League Two, gaining promotion to League One through play-off victories over Rochdale (over two legs) and Shrewsbury Town.

The club also reached the third round of the FA Cup, before being defeated by Aston Villa.

== Football League ==
9 August 2008 League Two	Bournemouth	1–1	Gillingham	Dean Court
	Anderton 42'		Mulligan 90'	Attendance: 5,377; Referee: J. Singh

16 August 2008 League Two	Gillingham	0–1	Luton Town	Priestfield Stadium
			Parkin 3'	Attendance: 5,339; Referee: S. Tanner

23 August 2008 League Two	Darlington	1–2	Gillingham	The Darlington Arena
	Purdie 78' (pen.)		Jackson 21'; Richards 90'	Attendance: 2,831; Referee: C. Pawson

30 August 2008 League Two	Gillingham	1–0	Accrington Stanley	Priestfield Stadium
	Oli 75'			Attendance: 4,733; Referee: D. Phillips

6 September 2008 League Two	Gillingham	3–0	Grimsby Town	Priestfield Stadium
	Jackson 34'; McCammon 70'; Daniels 89'			Attendance: 4,912; Referee: G. Hegley

13 September 2008 League Two	Shrewsbury Town	7–0	Gillingham	New Meadow
	Jackson 27'; Hibbert 30'; Davies 42', 87'; Coughlan 45'; Cansdell-Sherriff 52'; Holt 58' (pen.)			Attendance: 5,319; Referee: C. Sarginson

20 September 2008 League Two	Aldershot Town	2–1	Gillingham	Recreation Ground
	Hudson 75'; Davies 86'		Jackson 84'; McCammon (red card) 13'	Attendance: 4,198; Referee: G. Scott

27 September 2008 League Two	Gillingham	1–0	Port Vale	Priestfield Stadium
	McCombe 34' (o.g.)			Attendance: 4,986; Referee: A. Woolmer

4 October 2008 League Two	Exeter City	3–0	Gillingham	St James Park
	Logan 7'; Stansfield 39', 43'			Attendance: 4,819; Referee: I. Williamson

11 October 2008 League Two	Gillingham	5–0	Morecambe	Priestfield Stadium
	Bentley 21'; Jackson 24', 36'; Artell 73' (o.g.); McCammon 80'			Attendance: 4,316; Referee: M. Thorpe

18 October 2008 League Two	Bradford City	2–2	Gillingham	Valley Parade
	Thorne 21'; Colbeck 45'		Jackson 51', 84'; Bentley (red card) 58'	Attendance: 12,432; Referee: D. Foster

21 October 2008 League Two	Gillingham	2–2	Notts County	Priestfield Stadium
	Mulligan 39'; Southall 63'		Butcher 65'; Facey 79'	Attendance: 4,396; Referee: P. Miller

25 October 2008 League Two	Gillingham	2–0	Chester City	Priestfield Stadium
	Barcham 72'; Mills 74'			Attendance: 4,852; Referee: G. Ward

28 October 2008 League Two	Lincoln City	2–0	Gillingham	Sincil Bank
	Frecklington 12'; N'Guessan 14'			Attendance: 4,396; Referee: D. Webb

1 November 2008 League Two	Macclesfield Town	0–1	Gillingham	Moss Rose
			Miller 18'	Attendance: 1,635; Referee: J. Singh

15 November 2008 League Two	Gillingham	4–0	Rotherham United	Priestfield Stadium
	King 6'; Miller 58'; Richards 78'; Cumbers 88'		Harrison (red card) 35'	Attendance: 5,304; Referee: R. Beeby

22 November 2008 League Two	Bury	4–0	Gillingham	Gigg Lane
	Bishop 9', 59'; Hurst 40', 63'			Attendance: 2,068; Referee: C. Boyeson

25 November 2008 League Two	Gillingham	1–1	Rochdale	Priestfield Stadium
	Jackson 17'		Le Fondre 61'	Attendance: 4,029; Referee: S. Cook

6 December 2008 League Two	Gillingham	2–1	Chesterfield	Priestfield Stadium
	Miller 18'; Jackson 45'		Lester 60'	Attendance: 4,622; Referee: P. Gibbs

13 December 2008 League Two	Barnet	2–2	Gillingham	Underhill Stadium
	Leary 46'; O'Flynn 71'		Barcham 67'; Jackson 90'	Attendance: 2,248; Referee: A. Penn

20 December 2008 League Two	Gillingham	1–1	Brentford	Priestfield Stadium
	Jackson 60'; Fuller (red card) 88'		MacDonald 28'; Elder (red card) 69'	Attendance: 5,521; Referee: O. Langford

26 December 2008 League Two	Dagenham & Redbridge	2–0	Gillingham	Victoria Road
	Strevens 1'; Benson 50'			Attendance: 2,844; Referee: G. Scott

28 December 2008 League Two	Gillingham	1–1	Wycombe Wanderers	Priestfield Stadium
	Weston 84'		Bloomfield 31'	Attendance: 5,979; Referee: R. Booth

17 January 2009 League Two	Morecambe	0–1	Gillingham	Christie Park
			Weston 19'	Attendance: 2,027; Referee: G. Laws

20 January 2009 League Two	Port Vale	1–3	Gillingham	Vale Park
	Richards 28'		Oli 49'; Miller 69'; Jackson 72' (pen.)	Attendance: 4,539; Referee: J. Linington

24 January 2009 League Two	Gillingham	1–0	Exeter City	Priestfield Stadium
	Miller 79'			Attendance: 5,638; Referee: G. Horwood

27 January 2009 League Two	Gillingham	1–2	Lincoln City	Priestfield Stadium
	Jackson 25' (pen.)		Horsfield 52'; N'Guessan 90'	Attendance: 4,525; Referee: S. Hooper

31 January 2009 League Two	Chester City	0–1	Gillingham	Deva Stadium
			Barcham 79'	Attendance: 1,541; Referee: D. Webb

7 February 2009 League Two	Gillingham	0–2	Bradford City	Priestfield Stadium
			Daley 45'; Boulding 70'	Attendance: 4,866; Referee: P. Taylor

14 February 2009 League Two	Rotherham United	2–0	Gillingham	Don Valley Stadium
	Clarke 25'; Green 81'			Attendance: 2,757; Referee: C. Webster

17 February 2009 League Two	Gillingham	4–4	Aldershot Town	Priestfield Stadium
	Weston 21'; McCammon 49'; Barcham 55'; Miller 72' (pen.)		Lindegaard 20'; Morgan 57'; Bentley 61' (o.g.); Sandell 66'	Attendance: 5,974; Referee: S. Attwell

21 February 2009 League Two	Gillingham	3–1	Macclesfield Town	Priestfield Stadium
	King 2'; Barcham 74', 88'		Evans 80' (pen.)	Attendance: 4,620; Referee: D. Phillips

28 February 2009 League Two	Gillingham	1–0	Bournemouth	Priestfield Stadium
	Southall 58'			Attendance: 5,353; Referee: S. Cook

3 March 2009 League Two	Luton Town	0–0	Gillingham	Kenilworth Road
				Attendance: 5,739

7 March 2009 League Two	Accrington Stanley	0–2	Gillingham	Crown Ground
			Jackson 18'; Oli 67'	Attendance: 1,308; Referee: M. Haywood

10 March 2009 League Two	Gillingham	1–0	Darlington	Priestfield Stadium
	Jackson 90' (pen.)			Attendance: 4,730; Referee: S. Bratt

14 March 2009 League Two	Gillingham	2–2	Shrewsbury Town	Priestfield Stadium
	Weston 4'; Southall 51'		Holt 79' (pen.), 90'	Attendance: 6,023; Referee: G. Horwood

17 March 2009 League Two	Notts County	0–1	Gillingham	Meadow Lane
			Jackson 58'	Attendance: 3,189; Referee: N. Swarbrick

21 March 2009 League Two	Grimsby Town	3–0	Gillingham	Blundell Park
	Akpa Akpro 33'; Hegarty 58'; Conlon 90'			Attendance: 6,406; Referee: N. Miller

28 March 2009 League Two	Brentford	1–1	Gillingham	Griffin Park
	Hunt 41'		Jackson 59' (pen.)	Attendance: 7,908; Referee: F. Graham

4 April 2009 League Two	Gillingham	0–2	Barnet	Priestfield Stadium
			Furlong 23'; O'Flynn 54' (pen.)	Attendance: 6,033; Referee: K. Friend

11 April 2009 League Two	Wycombe Wanderers	1–0	Gillingham	Adams Park
	Akinde 41'			Attendance: 6,306; Referee: L. Mason

13 April 2009 League Two	Gillingham	2–1	Dagenham & Redbridge	Priestfield Stadium
	McCammon 8'; Oli 88'		Saunders 41'	Attendance: 6,945; Referee: P. Walton

18 April 2009 League Two	Chesterfield	0–1	Gillingham	Saltergate
			McCammon 22'	Attendance: 3,933; Referee: G. Salisbury

25 April 2009 League Two	Gillingham	0–0	Bury	Priestfield Stadium
				Attendance: 8,360; Referee: R. East

2 May 2009 League Two	Rochdale	0–1	Gillingham	Spotland Stadium
			Weston 20'	Attendance: 3,480; Referee: D. Deadman

Pld	W	D	L	F	A	Pts
46	21	12	13	58	55	75

Pld = Matches played; W = Matches won; D = Matches drawn; L = Matches lost; F = Goals for; A = Goals against; Pts = Points

=== Play-offs ===
7 May 2009 Semi Final 1st Leg	Rochdale	0–0	Gillingham	Spotland Stadium
				Referee: K. Friend

10 May 2009 Semi Final 2nd Leg	Gillingham	2–1	Rochdale	Priestfield Stadium
	Jackson 13', 58' (pen.)		Dagnall 36'	Attendance: 9,585; Referee: M. Oliver

23 May 2009 Final	Gillingham	1–0	Shrewsbury Town	Wembley Stadium
	Jackson 90'			Attendance: 53,706; Referee: C. Oliver

== FA Cup ==
As a League Two club, Gillingham entered the FA Cup at the first round stage. Bury were defeated by a second-half Andy Barcham goal at Gigg Lane, earning Gillingham a second round tie against Stockport County of League One. The first game ended goalless at Priestfield Stadium, before the Gills came from behind to win 2–1 at Edgeley Park. Premier League side Aston Villa proved too strong for Gillingham in the third round, eventually winning 2–1 in a televised fixture.

8 November 2008 First Round	Bury	0–1	Gillingham	Gigg Lane
			Barcham 71'	Attendance: 2,161; Referee: A. Haines

29 November 2008 Second Round	Gillingham	0–0	Stockport County	Priestfield Stadium
				Attendance: 4,419; Referee: P. Miller

9 December 2008 Second Round replay	Stockport County	1–2	Gillingham	Edgeley Park
	Gleeson 17'		Barcham 25', 34'	Attendance: 3,329; Referee: A. Hall

4 January 2009 Third Round	Gillingham	1–2	Aston Villa	Priestfield Stadium
	Jackson 57'		Milner 13', 79' (pen.)	Attendance: 10,107; Referee: K. Stroud

== Football League Cup ==
12 August 2008 First Round	Gillingham	0–1	Colchester United	Priestfield Stadium
			Heath 11'	Attendance: 2,566; Referee: P. Crossley

== Football League Trophy ==
7 October 2008 Southern Section First Round	Gillingham	0–1	Colchester United	Priestfield Stadium
			Yeates 60'	Attendance: 1,557; Referee: F. Graham

== Squad statistics ==
Gillingham used a total of 28 players during the course of the season, although none played in all 55 competitive matches. John Nutter made the most appearances during the season, with Gillingham's 4–4 draw with Aldershot Town being the only game he did not take part in (he was an unused substitute). Simeon Jackson finished as the club's top goalscorer, finding the net on 21 occasions.

Name	League		FA Cup		League Cup		League Trophy		Total	
Name	Apps	Goals	Apps	Goals	Apps	Goals	Apps	Goals	Apps	Goals
(England) Andy Barcham	34 (2)	6	4	3	–	–	1	0	39 (2)	9
(England) Mark Bentley	34 (6)	1	4	0	1	0	1	0	40 (6)	1
(England) Tyrone Berry	2 (3)	0	–	–	0 (1)	0	–	–	2 (4)	0
(Wales) Andrew Crofts	7 (2)	0	0 (1)	0	1	0	–	–	8 (3)	0
(England) Luis Cumbers	0 (7)	1	–	–	–	–	–	–	0 (7)	1
(England) Charlie Daniels	5	1	–	–	–	–	–	–	5	1
(England) Barry Fuller	40	0	3	0	1	0	1	0	45	0
(Canada) Simeon Jackson	40 (4)	20	3	1	1	0	1	0	45 (4)	21
(Sierra Leone) Albert Jarrett	11 (6)	0	3	0	–	–	1	0	15 (6)	0
(England) Josh Wright	8	0	–	–	–	–	–	–	8	0
(Northern Ireland) Alan Julian	4	0	1	0	1	0	–	–	6	0
(England) Simon King	46	2	4	0	1	0	1	0	52	2
(England) Stuart Lewis	16 (8)	0	1 (1)	0	–	–	–	–	17 (9)	0
(Barbados) Mark McCammon	21 (12)	5	0 (1)	0	1	0	–	–	22 (13)	5
(Northern Ireland) Adam Miller	32 (3)	6	4	0	1	0	–	–	37 (3)	6
(England) Leigh Mills	6 (1)	1	–	–	–	–	1	0	7 (1)	1
(Republic of Ireland) Gary Mulligan	12 (14)	2	2 (2)	0	0 (1)	0	–	–	14 (17)	2
(England) Tom Murphy	–	–	–	–	–	–	0 (1)	0	0 (1)	0
(England) John Nutter	46 (2)	0	4	0	1	0	1	0	52 (2)	0
(England) Dennis Oli	23 (11)	4	1	0	0 (1)	0	–	–	24 (12)	4
(England) Jack Payne	0 (2)	0	–	–	–	–	–	–	0 (2)	0
(Canada) Jaime Peters	1 (2)	0	–	–	–	–	–	–	1 (2)	0
(England) Andy Pugh	0 (1)	0	0 (1)	0	–	–	0 (1)	0	0 (3)	0
(England) Garry Richards	29 (10)	2	3	0	1	0	0 (1)	0	33 (11)	2
(England) Simon Royce	45	0	3	0	–	–	1	0	49	0
(England) Nicky Southall	28 (9)	3	–	–	1	0	1	0	30 (9)	3
(England) Rene Steer	3 (2)	0	–	–	–	–	–	–	3 (2)	0
(England) Curtis Weston	46 (2)	5	4	0	–	–	1	0	51 (2)	5

== See also ==
- Gillingham F.C. seasons
