= 2009 Football League Two play-off final =

- The match was played at Wembley Stadium.
- Event: 2008–09 Football League Two
Gillingham	Shrewsbury Town
1	0
- Date: 23 May 2009
- Venue: Wembley Stadium, London
- Referee: Clive Oliver (Northumberland)
- Attendance: 53,706

The 2009 Football League Two play-off final was an association football match played at Wembley Stadium on 23 May 2009, to determine the fourth and final team to gain promotion from League Two, the fourth tier of the English football league system, in the 2008–09 season. Gillingham, who had finished fifth during the league season, faced Shrewsbury Town, who had finished seventh. The match was Shrewsbury's second appearance at the new Wembley Stadium and Gillingham's first, although both clubs had played at the previous stadium of the same name. The teams reached the final by defeating Rochdale and Bury respectively; the semi-final between Shrewsbury and Bury had to be decided by a penalty shoot-out.

The final drew a crowd of just under 54,000 and was refereed by Clive Oliver. Gillingham were the stronger team in the first half but only came close to scoring a goal once and at half-time the score was 0–0. Both teams attacked more strongly in the second half, requiring both goalkeepers to make saves, but the match remained scoreless until the last minute, when Simeon Jackson headed in Josh Wright's corner kick to give Gillingham the lead; Shrewsbury made a last-ditch attack but were unable to equalise. Gillingham thus won the match 1–0 to gain promotion back to League One one year after being relegated.

Post-match analysis showed that referee Oliver had wrongly awarded the corner kick from which the goal was scored, but defeated manager Paul Simpson chose not to criticise the decision in his post-match comments. Gillingham spent only one season at the higher level before being relegated back to League Two. After their Wembley defeat in 2009, Shrewsbury spent three further seasons in League Two before gaining promotion.

== Route to the final ==
Football League Two final table, leading positions
Pos	Team	Pld	W	D	L	GF	GA	GD	Pts
1	Brentford	46	23	16	7	65	36	+29	85
2	Exeter City	46	22	13	11	65	50	+15	79
3	Wycombe Wanderers	46	20	18	8	54	33	+21	78
4	Bury	46	21	15	10	63	43	+20	78
5	Gillingham	46	21	12	13	58	55	+3	75
6	Rochdale	46	19	13	14	70	59	+11	70
7	Shrewsbury Town	46	17	18	11	61	44	+17	69
8	Dagenham & Redbridge	46	19	11	16	77	53	+24	68

In the 2008–09 Football League season, the teams finishing in the top three positions in Football League Two, the fourth tier of the English football league system, gained automatic promotion to League One. Champions Brentford, Exeter City, and Wycombe Wanderers were promoted automatically. The teams finishing between fourth and seventh inclusive competed in the play-offs for the fourth and final promotion place.

Gillingham finished the season in fifth place with 75 points, three points outside the automatic promotion positions; Shrewsbury Town finished two places lower with 69 points. Shrewsbury had only qualified for the play-offs by defeating Dagenham & Redbridge in the final match of the regular season, enabling them to overtake their opponents in the league table and leave them in eighth place, one point outside the play-off places. In the play-off semi-finals, Gillingham were paired with sixth-placed Rochdale and Shrewsbury with fourth-place finishers Bury. Each semi-final was played on a two-legged basis, with one game at each team's home stadium and the result determined based on the aggregate score of the two games. The first leg of Gillingham's semi-final, played at Rochdale's Spotland Stadium on 7 May 2009, finished in a 0–0 draw; BBC Sport commented that "the two sides largely cancelled each other out". The first leg of the other semi-final, played on the same day at Shrewsbury's home ground, New Meadow, was decided by a late own goal from Shrewsbury's Neil Ashton, who accidentally lobbed the ball over his own goalkeeper Luke Daniels to give Bury a 1–0 win.

The second-leg matches took place three days later. At Gillingham's Priestfield Stadium, Simeon Jackson scored from a cross by Andy Barcham to give Gillingham the lead in the 13th minute, only for Chris Dagnall to equalise for Rochdale in the 36th minute. Jackson scored a second goal with a penalty kick in the 58th minute after John Nutter had been fouled by Rory McArdle. Gillingham thus won the match 2–1 and won their semi-final on aggregate by the same score. Gillingham manager Mark Stimson was quoted as saying that reaching the final was just reward for his players' commitment throughout the season. At Bury's Gigg Lane, Shrewsbury goalkeeper Daniels saved a penalty kick by Bury's Phil Jevons and Kevin McIntyre scored a goal for the away team in the 88th minute to level the aggregate score at 1–1 and require extra time to be played. Shortly after the start of the extra period, Shrewsbury's Steve Leslie was sent off. With no further goals being scored in extra time, the semi-final ended in a draw and a penalty shoot-out was required to decide which team would advance to the final. Daniels saved penalty kicks from Bury's Andy Bishop and Danny Racchi and Shrewsbury won the shoot-out and thus reached the final. Shrewsbury manager Paul Simpson singled out Daniels for praise and commented on his team's "sheer guts and determination".

Gillingham				Shrewsbury Town
Opponent	Result	Legs	Round	Opponent	Result	Legs
Rochdale	2–1	0–0 away; 2–1 home	Semi-finals	Bury	1–1; Shrewsbury won penalty shoot-out 4–3	0–1 home; 1–0 away

== Background ==
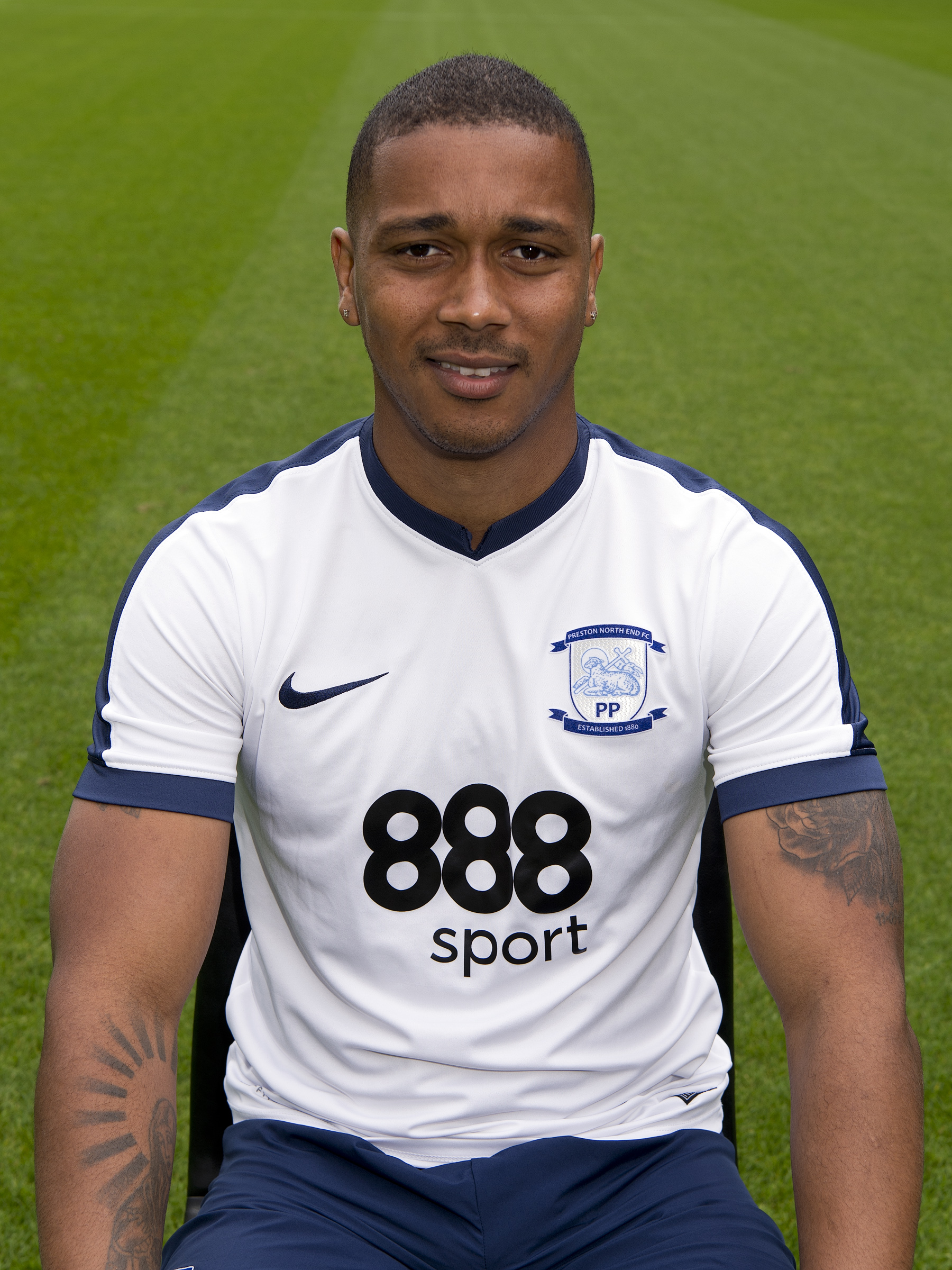
Shrewsbury's Chris Humphrey (pictured in 2016) had not played in the second leg of the semi-final but was selected for the final by manager Paul Simpson.

The match was Gillingham's first appearance at the new Wembley Stadium, which opened in 2007, although the club had played at the previous stadium of the same name in play-off finals in 1999 and 2000. Shrewsbury had previously played at the new Wembley in the 2007 League Two play-off final and at the original in the 1996 Football League Trophy Final. The teams had met twice during the regular season. In September, Shrewsbury defeated Gillingham 7–0 at New Meadow, the largest margin of victory achieved by any team in League Two during the season. The return match in March at Priestfield Stadium ended in a 2–2 draw. Shortly before the start of the final, sports betting organisation Sky Bet gave identical odds of 6/4 on both teams to win, with 9/4 on a draw.

The match drew an attendance of 53,706, the third-largest crowd ever to watch a Gillingham match and a figure significantly higher than the 35,715 registered at the previous year's League Two play-off final. The match referee was 48-year-old Clive Oliver representing the Northumberland Football Association. His 24-year-old son Michael took charge of the League One play-off final the following day, the first time that a father and son had refereed Football League play-off finals in the same season. Pre-match entertainment included teams from Killamarsh Junior School and Thurlby Community Primary School competing in the final of the Football Association Community Cup, a parade by members of the British armed forces, and a performance of the National Anthem led by operatic vocalist Will Martin. The guests of honour were Lord Mawhinney, the chairman of the Football League, and Mark Osikoya, Head of Marketing Assets for the League's sponsors, Coca-Cola. The match was broadcast live in the United Kingdom on the Sky Sports 1 television channel with commentary provided by Garry Birtles and Bill Leslie.

Gillingham manager Stimson selected the same eleven players in his starting line-up as had started the second leg of the semi-final against Rochdale. Adam Miller, who had missed both legs of the semi-final due to injury, was fit again, but Stimson named him as one of the substitutes. Four of Gillingham's players had played at Wembley two years earlier for Stevenage Borough in the 2005 FA Trophy Final. Veteran Nicky Southall, the only member of the Gillingham squad to have played in the club's appearances at the old Wembley in 1999 and 2000, was not included in the starting line-up or among the substitutes. Shrewsbury manager Simpson made two changes from the team which had started the second leg of the semi-final against Bury, replacing David Worrall and Omer Riza with Chris Humphrey and Nick Chadwick; both Worrall and Riza dropped to the substitutes' bench. Steve Leslie was not available for selection as he was serving a suspension after being sent off against Bury and both Mike Jackson and David Hibbert had failed to recover from injuries sustained earlier in the season. Prior to the match, Jackson was Gillingham's top goalscorer with 20 goals; Shrewsbury's Grant Holt was the season's leading scorer among all League Two players with 28 goals: 20 in the league, 1 in the Football League Cup, and 7 in the Football League Trophy.

== Match ==
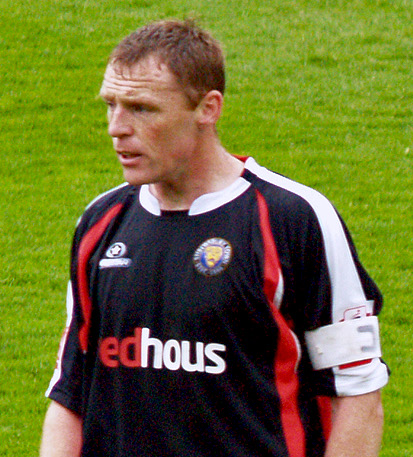
Shrewsbury's Graham Coughlan played a prominent role for his team in the first half.

=== First half ===
After the players were presented to the guests of honour, Shrewsbury kicked off the match at 3:00 pm. After less than a minute, Gillingham defender Barry Fuller was forced to hack the ball clear of his penalty area after confusion among his teammates. Gillingham were awarded three free kicks in the first five minutes; the third of these was played to Barcham in a position close to the Shrewsbury goal, but his header made only glancing contact with the ball and it went wide of the goal. Moments later, Fuller challenged Shrewsbury's Ben Davies for the ball in the Gillingham penalty area and appeared to catch him on the upper body with his boot, but the referee did not penalise him for it. Early on, both teams concentrated their attacking play on the left-hand side of the pitch from their respective points of view, with Barcham and Davies featuring prominently in those areas. In the 12th minute, Davies attempted to run past Fuller, who was forced the kick the ball out of play, resulting in a throw-in for Shrewsbury. The ball was quickly played out again for a second throw-in to the same team. Ashton threw the ball in to Holt, who passed it back to him, but Ashton's subsequent long ball into the penalty area evaded all his team-mates and went out for a goal kick to Gillingham. Shortly afterwards, Gillingham defender Nutter made a long run into an attacking position but his shot rebounded off the back of Shrewsbury's Graham Coughlan. Holt was again involved in an attack on the 15-minute mark but Gillingham's Garry Richards pressured him into kicking the ball out of play.

As the opening quarter of an hour ended, Gillingham began to dominate play, repeatedly sending the ball into the Shrewsbury penalty area from long range; goalkeeper Daniels was able to gather the ball on two occasions and on a third the defenders were able to kick it clear of the area. In the 19th minute, Chadwick was again forcefully challenged by a Gillingham player, this time Simon King, but referee Oliver ruled that no offence had been committed and allowed play to continue. Gillingham gained a corner kick midway through the first half, which reached Josh Wright on the edge of the penalty area, but his shot went high over the crossbar. Gillingham continued to have the greater share of possession of the ball leading up the half-hour mark, with Shrewsbury's only attacking opportunity resulting in a free kick from McIntyre which flew high into the Gillingham penalty area but was easily caught by goalkeeper Simon Royce. The first shot of the game to be on target came in the 31st minute; Gillingham's Wright took a corner kick which was met by Nutter, whose fierce shot for goal was palmed over the crossbar by Shrewsbury goalkeeper Daniels. Two minutes later, Gillingham's Richards caught Shrewsbury's Chadwick with his elbow as the two players both jumped for a high ball. Chadwick was forced to leave the pitch for a short time to receive medical attention, but was able to return.

Following the foul on Chadwick, Davies took a free kick from a position approximately 40 yards (37 m) from the Gillingham goal but it passed outside the left-hand goalpost. Three minutes later, Holt took a shot which went high and wide of the goal. On 39 minutes, Gillingham striker Jackson had his first goalscoring chance, but his shot was off target. Shrewsbury's Coughlan was able to close down attacking moves by Gillingham's Dennis Oli and Curtis Weston, leading Sky Sports online reporter Richard Bailey to say that the defender had been "immense" for his team. With only moments remaining before the half-time break, a Gillingham throw-in was cleared by the Shrewsbury defence but fell to Wright; he hit a hard shot along the ground, but Daniels dived low to his right to make what commentator Leslie called a "really good instinctive save". At half-time the game remained goalless; Paul Fletcher of BBC Sport noted that Gillingham were the better team in the first half and that the Shrewsbury players had looked nervous and struggled to keep possession of the ball.

=== Second half ===
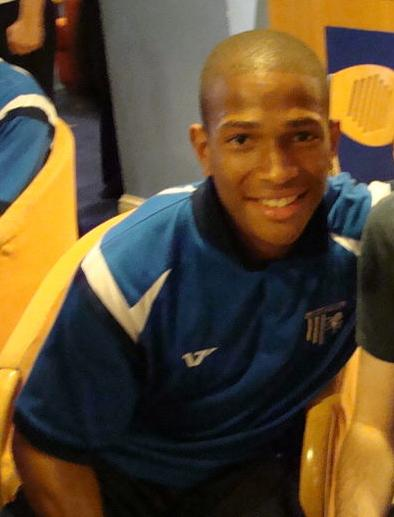
Gillingham's Simeon Jackson scored the only goal of the game.

Neither team made any substitutions during the half-time interval. Gillingham kicked off the second half, and began the second period strongly; Barcham quickly had a goalbound shot tipped away by goalkeeper Daniels. In the 49th minute, Shrewsbury's Ashton fouled Oli, resulting in a free kick to Gillingham, who sent a number of defenders forward to join the attack; Nutter took the kick but it was intercepted by Langmead, who played the ball behind the goal line for a corner kick to Gillingham. As the kick came in, Daniels was able to punch the ball clear. Shortly afterwards, Coughlan tangled with Gillingham's Weston, resulting in the referee showing both players a yellow card. Shrewsbury's Murray was also cautioned moments later, after fouling Jackson. Gillingham were struggling to retain possession of the ball and Shrewsbury had a number of attacking opportunities: Royce dived at the feet of Humphrey to gather the ball, and shortly afterwards saved a header from Chadwick. Holt became the third Shrewsbury player to be cautioned after he tripped up Gillingham's Stuart Lewis.

On the one-hour mark, Gillingham goalkeeper Royce made his first significant save of the match, stopping a left-footed shot from Shrewsbury's Davies; moments later Oli attempted to set up Jackson but Shrewsbury's Coughlan intercepted the ball. In the 64th minute, Shrewsbury's Kelvin Langmead played the ball to McIntyre, but he was unable to capitalise on what reporter Bailey considered the best opportunity of the game and his header went wide of the target. Shrewsbury continued to apply pressure; Gillingham's King cut out a pass from Ashton to Chadwick and Davies had a shot saved by Royce and shortly afterwards was tackled by Richards when in an attacking position. After 73 minutes, Shrewsbury manager Simpson used the first of his three permitted substitutions, bringing on Worrall in place of Paul Murray. At this point, the pace of the game was slowing and the players were beginning to exhibit signs of fatigue. Worrall quickly received the ball and eluded a Gillingham defender but lingered on the ball for too long and the attacking opportunity passed. Shortly afterwards, Holt met a pass from Ashton with a header but Royce was first to the ball and caught it.

In the 78th minute, Simpson brought on Riza as a substitute in place of Chadwick; Riza immediately got involved in the action, but was penalised for fouling Gillingham's Richards. Gillingham defender Lewis attempted to launch the next attack, but he took too long to pass to Jackson, who was caught in an offside position. Jackson was involved in several more attacks over the subsequent ten minutes, but each time the Shrewsbury defenders were able to close down the move. In the final minute of the game, Barcham tussled with a Shrewsbury defender; the ball went out of play and the referee awarded a corner kick to Gillingham. Wright took the corner and Jackson headed the ball into the goal to give Gillingham the lead. Defender Ashton, standing on the goal line, attempted to keep the ball from entering the goal but was unsuccessful. Shrewsbury launched a last-ditch attack in a bid to equalise, and Davies crossed the ball to team captain Coughlan in a potential goalscoring position, but his header went over the crossbar and Gillingham held on to claim victory.

=== Details ===
23 May 2009
15:00 BST

Gillingham	1–0	Shrewsbury Town
Jackson 90'	Report

Wembley Stadium, London
Attendance: 53,706
Referee: Clive Oliver (Northumberland)

Gillingham	Shrewsbury Town

GK	1	Simon Royce
RB	2	Barry Fuller (c)
CB	6	Garry Richards
CB	5	Simon King
LB	3	John Nutter
RM	4	Stuart Lewis
CM	26	Curtis Weston	(yellow card) 53'
LM	16	Josh Wright
RF	21	Dennis Oli
CF	10	Simeon Jackson
LF	32	Andy Barcham
Substitutes:
GK	23	Alan Julian
DF	8	Mark Bentley
MF	14	Adam Miller
MF	31	Albert Jarrett
FW	30	Mark McCammon
Manager:
Mark Stimson

GK	26	Luke Daniels
RB	2	Darren Moss
CB	8	Kelvin Langmead
CB	5	Graham Coughlan (c)	(yellow card) 53'
LB	3	Neil Ashton
RM	17	Chris Humphrey		(substituted off) 90'
CM	14	Ben Davies
CM	15	Paul Murray	(yellow card) 54'	(substituted off) 74'
LM	28	Kevin McIntyre
CF	16	Grant Holt	(yellow card) 60'
CF	21	Nick Chadwick		(substituted off) 79'
Substitutes:
GK	1	Glyn Garner
DF	24	Shane Cansdell-Sherriff
MF	23	David Worrall		(substituted in) 74'
FW	29	Moses Ashikodi		(substituted in) 90'
FW	31	Omer Riza		(substituted in) 79'
Manager:
Paul Simpson

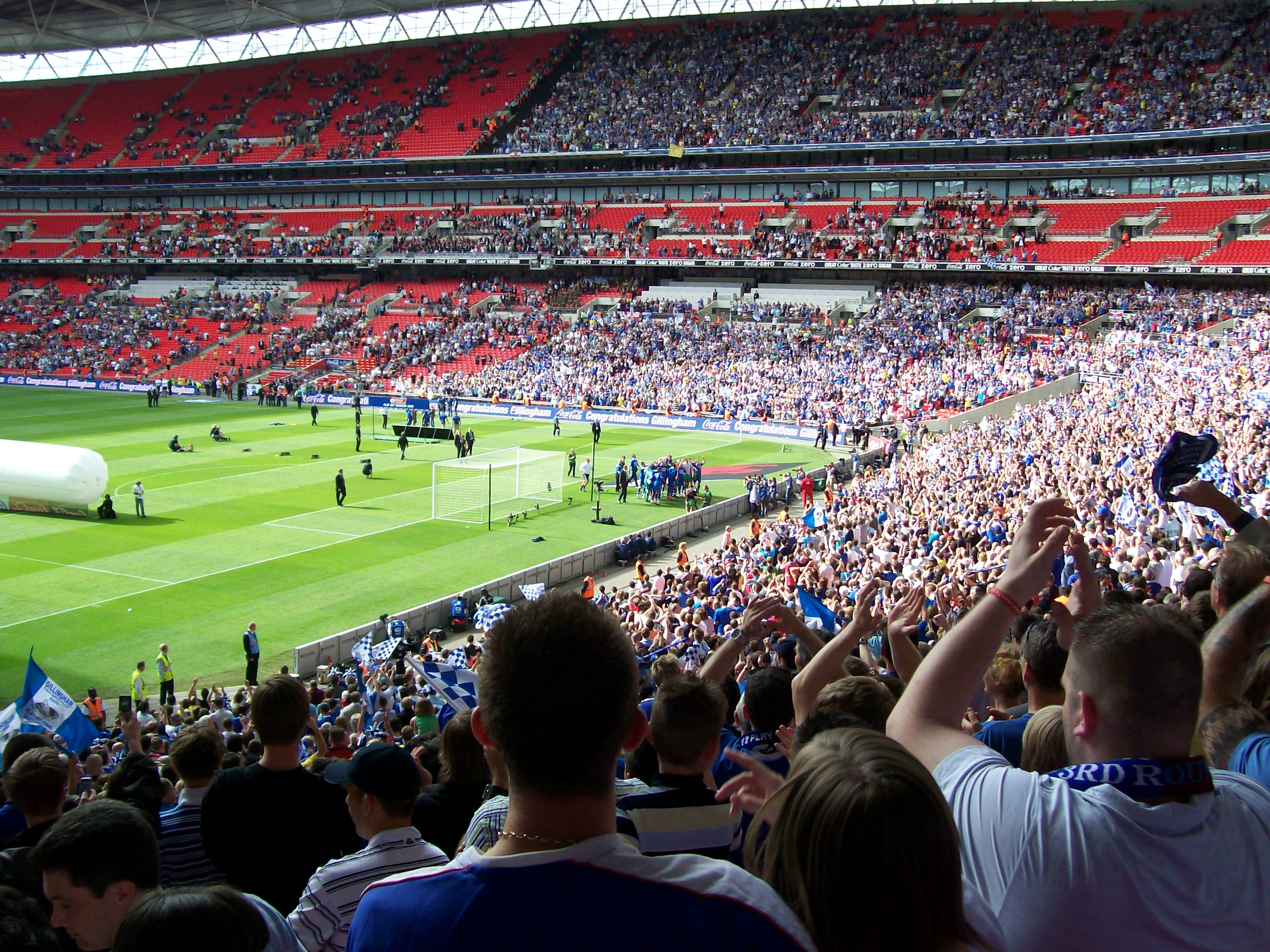
Gillingham fans celebrate after the match

Statistics
	Gillingham	Shrewsbury Town
Goals scored	1	0
Total shots	10	7
Shots on target	4	1
Ball possession	57%	43%
Corner kicks	9	1
Fouls committed	10	18
Offsides	1	1
Yellow cards	1	3
Red cards	0	0

== Post-match ==
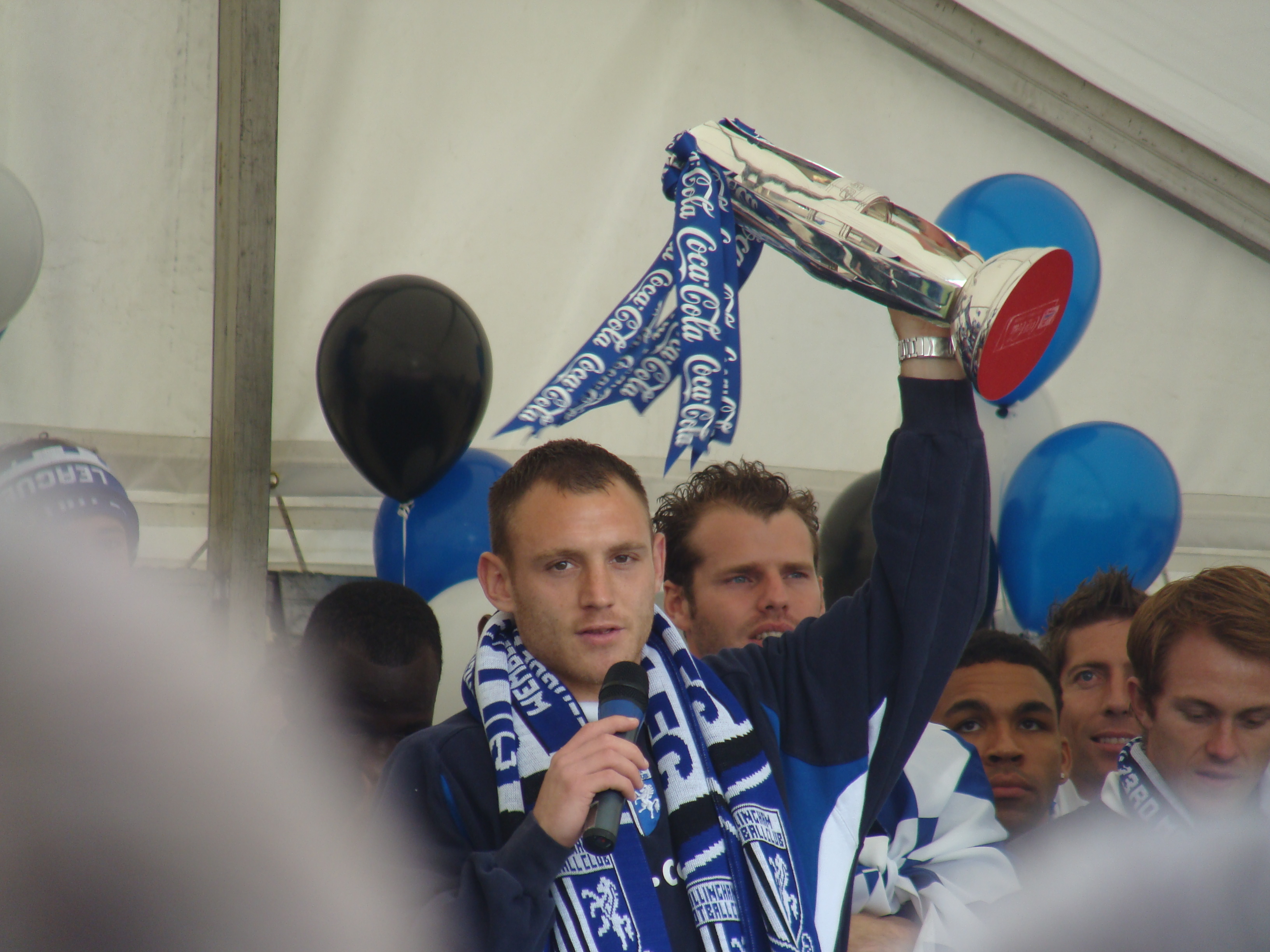
Gillingham captain Barry Fuller displays the trophy during the team's celebratory parade

After the match, Gillingham captain Fuller received the winners' trophy from the guests of honour and the club's players and officials celebrated on the pitch. Gillingham centre-back King was named man of the match. Despite his team having been defeated, BBC Sport's interactive Player Rater, which allowed fans to award marks out of 10 to players, rated Shrewsbury goalkeeper Daniels the man of the match. Post-match analysis showed that referee Oliver had wrongly awarded the corner kick from which the winning goal was scored, as the ball had last made contact with Gillingham's Barcham before going out of play, and therefore a goal kick should instead have been awarded to Shrewsbury. Paul Simpson referred to this in his post-match comments, but said that "if we look at things like that we will be clutching at straws". He also conceded that "over the 90 minutes they passed the ball better than us and created the better opportunities so I have to take my hat off to them". Mark Stimson stated that he would need to improve the quality of his playing squad for the subsequent season at the higher level and highlighted the financial benefits of his team's promotion, noting that large crowds would be expected for matches in League One against Leeds United, Norwich City and Southampton. Paul Doyle, writing for The Guardian, predicted that promotion would be worth an additional £1 million in revenue for the club. Two days after the final, the victorious players took part in a celebratory open-top bus parade from Rochester Castle to Priestfield Stadium. The leader of Medway Council attended the event and told the press "I think that this is a tremendous result, a tremendous fillip for the club and also for Medway as a whole".

As a result of their victory, Gillingham gained promotion back to League One a year after being relegated at the end of the 2007–08 season. The team spent only one season at the higher level, however, before once again being relegated to League Two, after which manager Stimson was dismissed from his job. Shrewsbury initially challenged for promotion in the 2009–10 season but a series of bad results in the latter stages of the season meant that the team finished in mid-table, after which manager Simpson had his contract terminated. Shrewsbury spent two further seasons in League Two before gaining automatic promotion in the 2011–12 season.
