= Mark McCammon =

Barbadian footballer

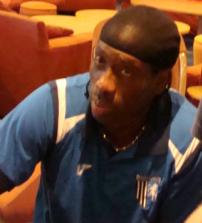
- McCammon in 2008

Personal information
- Full name: Mark Jason McCammon
- Date of birth: 7 August 1978 (age 48)
- Place of birth: Barnet, London, England
- Height: 1.96 m (6 ft 5 in)
- Position: Striker

Senior career*
Years	Team	Apps	(Gls)
1997–1999	Cambridge United	4	(0)
1999–2000	Charlton Athletic	4	(0)
2000	→ Swindon Town (loan)	4	(0)
2000–2003	Brentford	75	(10)
2003–2005	Millwall	21	(2)
2004–2005	→ Brighton & Hove Albion (loan)	18	(3)
2005–2006	Brighton & Hove Albion	7	(0)
2006	→ Bristol City (loan)	11	(4)
2006–2008	Doncaster Rovers	54	(6)
2008–2011	Gillingham	52	(5)
2010–2011	→ Bradford City (loan)	4	(0)
2011–2012	Braintree Town	5	(1)
2012	Sheffield FC	0	(0)
2012	→ Lincoln City (loan)	6	(2)
2012	Lincoln City	2	(0)
Total		267	(33)

International career
2006–2008	Barbados	5	(4)
- * Club domestic league appearances and goals

Mark Jason McCammon (born 7 August 1978) is a former professional footballer who played as a striker. Born in England, he represented the Barbados national team at international level.

After starting his career with Cambridge United in 1997, two years later he moved on to Charlton Athletic. In 2000, he was loaned out to Swindon Town, before signing with Brentford. He found regular football at Brentford, before departing for Millwall in 2003. Two years later he transferred to Brighton & Hove Albion, following a short loan period. Loaned out to Bristol City in 2006, he later moved on to Doncaster Rovers. He switched to Gillingham in 2008, where he remained for the next three years. He also played on loan for Bradford City in 2010. In October 2011, he signed for Braintree Town.

== Club career ==
=== Early career ===
McCammon played six games for Cambridge United on a non-contract basis between August 1997 and March 1999. He played a minimal role in the club's promotion out of the Third Division in 1998–99.

He signed for Premier League Charlton Athletic in March 1999, and played five games for the Addicks following their relegation into the First Division. He was also loaned out to struggling Swindon Town in January 2000, also of the First Division, and played four games before his return to The Valley.

=== Brentford ===
McCammon signed for Second Division Brentford in July 2000 for a fee of almost £100,000. He scored six goals in 33 games during his first season with the club.

Limited to fourteen league appearances in 2001–02, he was a seventieth-minute substitute for Ben Burgess in the 2002 play-off final, though his team lost the game 2–0 to Stoke City.

He posted 41 appearances in 2002–03, also bagging nine goals. However, he did not finish the season at Brentford, as he joined First Division Millwall in March.

=== Millwall ===
He made only seven appearances in 2003–04. Instead his season was most notable for a clash with sixteen-year-old teammate Moses Ashikodi, who reportedly threatened McCammon with a plastic knife. The club launched an investigation into the events, and the following month, Ashikodi left the club by mutual consent. McCammon went on to make a substitute appearance in the 2004 FA Cup Final, coming on for Neil Harris after 75 minutes, as Millwall lost 3–0 to Manchester United.

=== Brighton & Hove Albion ===
Having been limited to just eight appearances for Millwall in 2004–05, and was loaned out to Championship rivals Brighton & Hove Albion in December 2004. He signed a permanent deal with the Seagulls in February 2005. However, he was soon struck down by illness.

Having recovered from an ankle injury (a piece of floating bone in his ankle), he found his first team opportunities limited in 2005–06, and so in January went on trial at Watford. The following month he joined League One Bristol City on loan, after Watford manager Aidy Boothroyd showed no interest in signing the striker. The loan deal was extended to the end of the season, despite the striker suffering from illness and a back injury. He was not offered a permanent deal with Bristol in the summer, and upon his return to Brighton he found the club relegated out of the Championship.

=== Doncaster Rovers ===
McCammon moved to Doncaster Rovers in August 2006 following a successful trial period, and was confident of a successful season. He picked up the honour of being the first player to score at the Keepmoat Stadium, the newly built home of Doncaster Rovers, after he scored after nine minutes into the 3–0 win over Huddersfield Town on 1 January 2007. He finished the season with five goals in thirty games, having missed the close of the campaign with a shoulder injury.

McCammon hit eight goals in forty games during the club's 2007–08 promotion campaign, though rejected a new deal with the club in the summer. He was a 71st-minute substitute for Richie Wellens in the 2008 play-off final at Wembley Stadium; Donny beat Leeds United 1–0 to achieve promotion into the Championship.

=== Gillingham ===
McCammon joined League Two Gillingham in July 2008 on a three-year contract, as manager Mark Stimson hoped McCammon would prove an adequate replacement for Delroy Facey. Recovering from a hamstring injury in pre-season, he posted five goals in 35 games in 2008–09, and was an unused substitute in the club's play-off final victory over Shrewsbury Town.

Finding first team chances limited in 2009–10, he joined Bradford City on a one-month loan in February 2010, despite having turned down a loan move to Rotherham United and still holding reservations over a move back into League Two. After returning to Gillingham from Valley Parade he turned down a loan move to Conference South side Dover Athletic. He finished the campaign with 25 appearances, four of which were for the Bantams.

Challenged to prove his worth in August by manager Andy Hessenthaler, he played just six games of the 2010–11 campaign, at was released after the expiry of his contract.

=== Later years ===
In summer 2011 he had trials at Crewe Alexandra and Port Vale.

In October, he signed for Braintree Town and opened his account for the club on his first start against Bath City. In March he signed for Lincoln City and again made an immediate impact with a goal on his debut as a late substitute again Mansfield Town and a goal on his first start for the club against Newport County.

In February 2012, McCammon began action against Gillingham at an employment tribunal alleging racial discrimination. McCammon claimed that Hessenthaler was "racially intolerant" and that the club had tried to "frustrate him out". The Tribunal found that he had indeed been a victim of racial discrimination.

== International career ==
McCammon won five caps for Barbados, scoring four goals in the process. On 22 September 2006 he scored past Antigua and Barbuda in a 3–1 in the First Round of Qualifying for the 2007 Caribbean Cup. Two days later he scored a hat-trick past Anguilla in a 7–1 win – the nation's biggest ever victory. His nation went on to qualify for the tournament, before exiting at the First Round.

He returned to international football in 2008, so as to take part in his country's World Cup qualification campaign. On 15 June he played for his country in an 8–0 defeat to the United States at The Home Depot Center in Carson, California. Seven days later he played in the reverse fixture at Kensington Oval in Bridgetown, Barbados, which the Americans won 1–0.

== Playing style ==
McCammon was a target man striker, able to win the ball in the air.

== Career statistics ==
=== Club ===
Appearances and goals by club, season and competition
Club	Season	League			FA Cup		League Cup		Other		Total	
Club	Season	Division	Apps	Goals	Apps	Goals	Apps	Goals	Apps	Goals	Apps	Goals
Cambridge United	1997–98	Third Division	2	0	1	0	0	0	1 (Note: Appearance(s) in Football League Trophy)	0	4	0
Cambridge United	1998–99	Third Division	2	0	0	0	0	0	–		2	0
Cambridge United	Total		4	0	1	0	0	0	1	0	6	0
Charlton Athletic	1998–99	Premier League	0	0	0	0	0	0	–		0	0
Charlton Athletic	1999–2000	First Division	4	0	0	0	1	0	–		5	0
Charlton Athletic	Total		4	0	0	0	1	0	0	0	5	0
Swindon Town (loan)	1999–2000	First Division	4	0	0	0	0	0	–		4	0
Brentford	2000–01	Second Division	24	3	0	0	3	1	6	2	33	6
Brentford	2001–02	Second Division	15	0	1	0	0	0	–		16	0
Brentford	2002–03	Second Division	36	7	3	1	1	0	1	1	41	9
Brentford	Total		75	10	4	1	4	1	7	3	90	15
Millwall	2002–03	First Division	7	2	0	0	0	0	–		7	2
Millwall	2003–04	First Division	6	0	1	0	0	0	–		7	0
Millwall	2004–05	Championship	8	0	0	0	1	0	1 (Note: Appearance(s) in UEFA Cup)	0	10	0
Millwall	Total		21	2	1	0	1	0	1	0	24	2
Brighton & Hove Albion (loan)	2004–05	Championship	18	3	0	0	0	0	–		18	3
Brighton & Hove Albion	2005–06	Championship	7	0	1	0	1	1	–		9	1
Bristol City (loan)	2005–06	League One	11	4	0	0	0	0	–		11	4
Doncaster Rovers	2006–07	League One	22	2	4	1	1	2	3	0	30	5
Doncaster Rovers	2007–08	League One	32	4	1	1	2	1	5 (Note: Appearance(s) in Football League Trophy and league play-offs)	2	40	8
Doncaster Rovers	Total		54	6	5	2	3	3	8	2	70	13
Gillingham	2008–09	League Two	33	5	1	0	1	0	–		35	5
Gillingham	2009–10	League One	14	0	3	0	2	0	2	0	21	0
Gillingham	2010–11	League Two	5	0	0	0	0	0	1	0	6	0
Gillingham	Total		52	5	4	0	3	0	3	0	62	5
Bradford City (loan)	2009–10	League Two	4	0	0	0	0	0	–		4	0
Braintree Town	2011–12	Conference National	5	1	0	0	0	0	–		5	1
Sheffield	2011–12	Northern Premier League Division One South	0	0	0	0	0	0	–		0	0
Lincoln City (loan)	2011–12	Conference National	6	2	0	0	0	0	–		6	2
Lincoln City	2012–13	Conference National	2	0	0	0	0	0	–		2	0
Career total			267	33	16	3	13	5	20	5	316	46

=== International ===
Appearances and goals by national team and year
National team	Year	Apps	Goals
Barbados	2006	3	4
Barbados	2007	–	
Barbados	2008	2	0
Total		5	4

Scores and results list Barbados's goal tally first, score column indicates score after each McCammon goal.

List of international goals scored by Mark McCammon
No.	Date	Venue	Opponent	Score	Result	Competition
1	22 September 2006	Antigua Recreation Ground, St. John's, Antigua and Barbuda	Antigua and Barbuda	2–1	3–1	2007 Caribbean Cup qualification
2	24 September 2006	Antigua Recreation Ground, St. John's, Antigua and Barbuda	Anguilla	1–0	7–1	2007 Caribbean Cup qualification
3	24 September 2006	Antigua Recreation Ground, St. John's, Antigua and Barbuda	Anguilla	3–1	7–1	2007 Caribbean Cup qualification
4	24 September 2006	Antigua Recreation Ground, St. John's, Antigua and Barbuda	Anguilla	7–1	7–1	2007 Caribbean Cup qualification

== Honours ==
Cambridge United

- Football League Third Division runner-up: 1998–99

Brentford

- Football League Trophy runner-up: 2000–01

Millwall

- FA Cup runner-up: 2003–04

Doncaster Rovers

- Football League One play-offs: 2008

Gillingham

- Football League Two play-offs: 2009
