= John Nutter =

English association football player (born 1982)

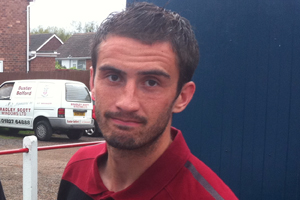
- Nutter in 2011

Personal information
- Full name: John Robert William Nutter
- Date of birth: 13 June 1982 (age 44)
- Place of birth: Taplow, England
- Height: 6 ft 2 in (1.88 m)
- Position: Left-back

Youth career
- 1998–2000: Blackburn Rovers

Senior career*
Years	Team	Apps	(Gls)
2001	Wycombe Wanderers	1	(0)
2001–2004	Aldershot Town	58	(5)
2002	→ St Albans City (loan)	7	(0)
2002	→ Gravesend & Northfleet (loan)	4	(0)
2004–2006	Grays Athletic	77	(1)
2006–2008	Stevenage Borough	60	(8)
2007–2008	→ Gillingham (loan)	3	(0)
2008–2011	Gillingham	135	(3)
2011–2013	Lincoln City	58	(3)
2012–2013	→ Woking (loan)	5	(0)
2013–2015	Woking	65	(1)
Total		473	(21)

International career
2007	England C	3	(0)
- * Club domestic league appearances and goals

John Robert William Nutter (born 13 June 1982) is an English former professional footballer who played as a left-back.

Nutter began his career at Blackburn Rovers' youth academy in 1998, spending two years at the club before joining Wycombe Wanderers, where he made his Football League debut. He signed for Aldershot Town in May 2001, making 79 appearances over three seasons and helping the club gain promotion to the Conference National as Isthmian League Premier Division champions in the 2002–03 season. During this period, he also had loan spells at St Albans City and Gravesend & Northfleet. Nutter moved to Conference South club Grays Athletic in July 2004, managed by Mark Stimson, and won the Conference South title as well as back-to-back FA Trophies in 2005 and 2006.

In May 2006, Nutter followed Stimson to Conference National club Stevenage Borough, where he added a third successive FA Trophy triumph during the 2006–07 season. He returned to the Football League in November 2007, reuniting with Stimson at Gillingham. Nutter made 157 appearances across three and a half seasons, with the club alternating between League One and League Two during his time there. After being released, he joined Lincoln City of the Conference Premier in July 2011. He later moved to Woking, initially on loan before signing permanently in January 2013, and retired at the end of the 2014–15 season to focus on his career as a teacher.

== Club career ==
=== Early career ===
Nutter began his career at Blackburn Rovers' youth academy, joining the club's Youth Training Scheme (YTS) programme in 1998 at the age of 16, before later signing a scholarship with the club. During his time at Blackburn, he was part of the team that won the under-17 Academy Cup, defeating Manchester City in the final. He was released by Blackburn in 2000 and was subsequently signed by Wycombe Wanderers in early 2001. Nutter made one first-team appearance for the club, making his Football League debut in the club's 3–2 away defeat to Peterborough United on 24 February 2001. He was also part of the squad that travelled to the FA Cup semi-final against Liverpool at Villa Park, although he did not play in the match. His time at Wycombe was hampered by an ankle injury, which resulted in limited first-team opportunities. He departed the club at the end of the 2000–01 season.

In May 2001, Nutter joined Aldershot Town, then competing in the Isthmian League Premier Division. He made his debut in Aldershot's 3–1 home victory against Enfield on 18 August 2001, and scored his first goal for the club in a 2–1 away win over Heybridge Swifts. Nutter made 19 appearances for Aldershot during the 2001–02 season, scoring twice. He also made eight appearances for divisional rivals St Albans City during a two-month loan spell. In November 2002, Nutter spent a month on loan at Conference National club Gravesend & Northfleet, making four appearances. During the season, he scored three times in 21 appearances for Aldershot, in a season that saw the club secure promotion to the Conference National after winning the Isthmian League Premier Division title. Nutter played regularly during Aldershot's return to the highest tier of non-League football, making 28 appearances in all competitions and scoring once in a 4–2 away victory over Bishop's Stortford in the FA Trophy in January 2004. Aldershot missed out on back-to-back promotions, losing on penalties in the play-off final to Shrewsbury Town. During his three years at Aldershot, Nutter made 68 appearances in the league, FA Cup and FA Trophy, scoring six goals.

=== Grays Athletic ===
Ahead of the 2004–05 season, in July 2004, Nutter signed for Conference South club Grays Athletic, managed by Mark Stimson. He made his debut for Grays on the opening day of the season, playing the first 57 minutes in a 1–1 away draw against Hayes on 14 August 2004. Three days later, he scored his only goal of the season in a 4–1 victory over Redbridge at the New Recreation Ground. In Nutter's first season with Grays, the club achieved promotion by winning the Conference South title by a margin of 23 points. During the same season, Grays also won the FA Trophy, defeating Hucknall Town on penalties in the final at Villa Park, with Nutter playing the full match. He played regularly during the 2005–06 season as Grays finished third in the league. His only goal of the season came in the Conference play-off semi-final second leg, as Grays were defeated 5–4 on aggregate by Halifax Town. Shortly after the play-off defeat, Nutter was part of the team that earned back-to-back FA Trophy titles following a 2–0 victory against Woking in the 2006 FA Trophy final at Upton Park. The match marked Nutter's final appearance for the club. On securing successive FA Trophy victories with Grays, Nutter stated: "The FA Trophy wins for Grays Athletic were great, a fantastic achievement for the club, we had some terrific players at the time".

=== Stevenage Borough ===
With his contract at Grays expiring, Nutter opted to sign for Conference National club Stevenage Borough on 31 May 2006. He joined on a free transfer and signed a two-year contract. The move reunited him with Stimson, who made Nutter his first signing following his own move from Grays to Stevenage. Nutter revealed that he had rejected an offer of a contract extension at Grays, as well as an offer from Peterborough United. He made his Stevenage debut against Altrincham on 12 August 2006, playing the full match in a 2–1 away defeat. Nutter scored his first goal for Stevenage in a 3–2 victory against Woking on 3 October 2006, converting a late penalty to restore parity in the match, before Stevenage went on to score a winner in injury time. He played in all 46 league matches during his first season with the club, as well as making a further 10 appearances in cup competitions, scoring six times. Nutter was part of the squad that reached the 2007 FA Trophy final in May 2007, the first competitive match held at the new Wembley Stadium. He played the entire match in Stevenage's 3–2 victory against Kidderminster Harriers, a game in which Stevenage trailed by two goals, meaning he had won the FA Trophy for the third successive year.

Nutter scored his first goal of the 2007–08 season in Stevenage's 3–0 home victory over Weymouth in August 2007, scoring a free kick that found the top corner of the goal. He was part of the defence that broke a club record and equalled a Conference Premier record when Stevenage went eight games without conceding a goal, from August to October 2007. Following the departure of Stimson to Gillingham in November 2007, Stevenage rejected several offers for Nutter from Gillingham. He remained at Stevenage for a further three weeks; his last game for the club was a 3–2 home defeat to Halifax Town. He scored eight times in 73 appearances for the club in all competitions.

=== Gillingham ===
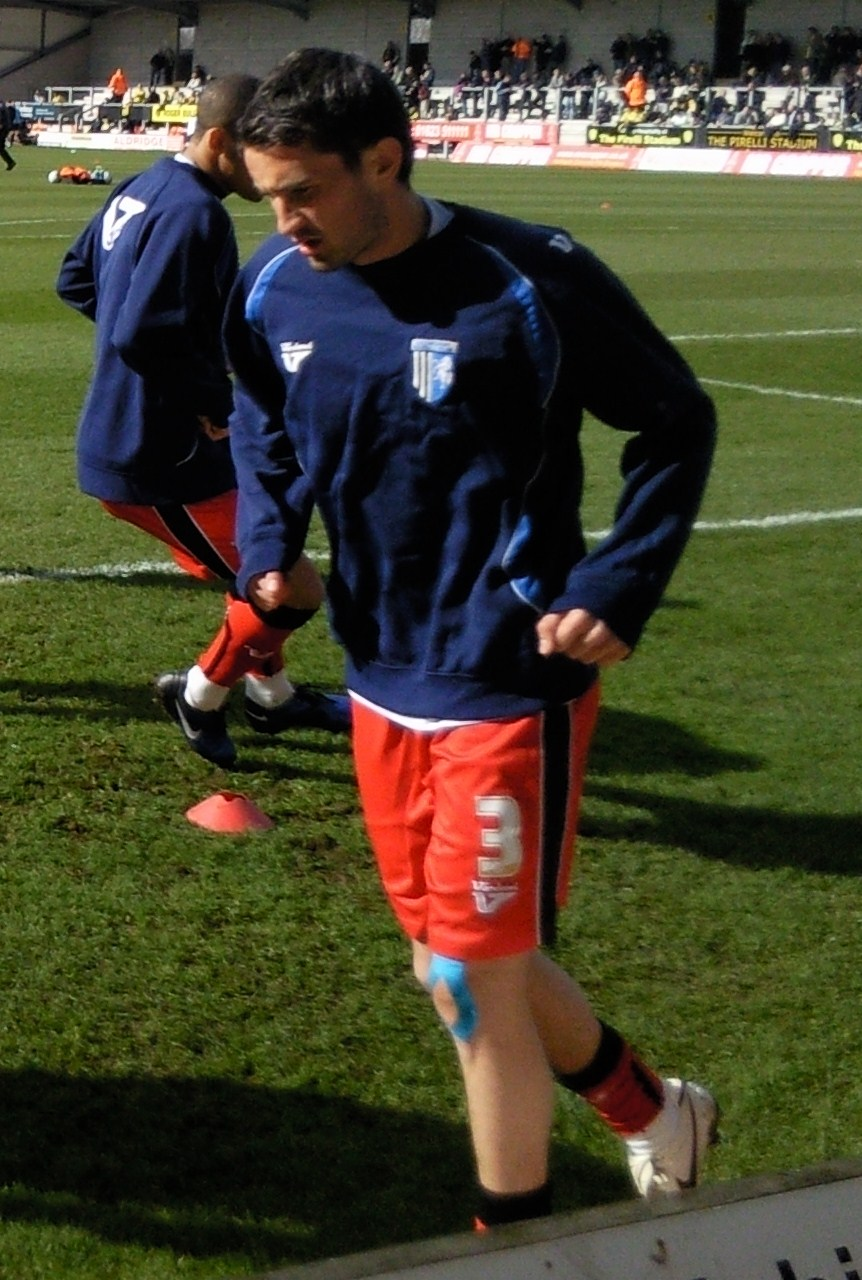
Nutter during his time at Gillingham

Later that month, Nutter joined Gillingham, along with Stevenage midfielder Adam Miller, for a combined fee of £65,000. The move was initially on loan until January 2008, at which point the deal was made permanent. He debuted for Gillingham in a 1–1 home draw with Southend United on 26 December 2007, playing the full match. Nutter made 25 appearances for the club during the second half of the 2007–08 season, a season in which Gillingham were relegated to League Two. He scored once during the season, in a 1–1 draw against Bristol Rovers at the Memorial Stadium in April 2008. The 2008–09 season was Nutter's first full season at Gillingham. He was joined at the club by former Stevenage players Barry Fuller, Alan Julian, and Stuart Lewis, as well as Dennis Oli, with whom he played alongside at Grays. Nutter made 54 appearances during the season, a season in which Gillingham earned promotion back to League One following a 1–0 victory against Shrewsbury Town in the play-off final at Wembley Stadium in May 2009. He provided 11 assists from left-back during the season. The promotion was the third of Nutter's career, having also enjoyed league success at Aldershot and Grays.

Nutter started in the club's first match of the 2009–10 season; as Gillingham marked their return to the third tier of English football with a 5–0 victory against Swindon Town at Priestfield. He scored his only goal of the season, the second of his Gillingham career, in a 3–1 win over bottom-placed Stockport County in December 2009, marking his 100th appearance for the club with an "angled volley" that beat goalkeeper Owain Fôn Williams. Gillingham were relegated at the end of the season, finishing in 21st place. Nutter made 41 appearances during the season. Stimson left the club by mutual consent days after relegation was confirmed, and was replaced by Andy Hessenthaler. This meant that Nutter would be playing under a manager other than Stimson for the first time in six years (excluding a three-week spell under Peter Taylor at Stevenage). Nutter's contract was extended for a further year in June 2010 after he had played the required number of matches the previous season to trigger a clause in his contract. During the season, Nutter received the first red card of his career in a 2–0 home defeat to Dover Athletic in the FA Cup, earning the dismissal for a "professional foul". He made 37 appearances during the 2010–11 season, scoring once, as Gillingham narrowly missed out on a place in the play-offs. In May 2011, Nutter left Gillingham following the expiry of his contract. Over the course of his three-and-a-half-year spell with the Kent club, he made 157 appearances and scored three goals.

=== Lincoln City ===
Nutter joined Conference Premier club Lincoln City on a free transfer in July 2011. He signed a two-year contract and said the move offered a fresh start and a chance to prove himself and help the team succeed at that level. Nutter made his Lincoln debut on the opening day of the 2011–12 season, playing the full match in a 2–2 draw with Southport at Haig Avenue. He scored his first goal for the club on 26 November 2011, scoring Lincoln's third with a shot from outside the area in a 3–0 home victory over Ebbsfleet United. Nutter also scored a 20-yard free-kick in a 2–0 win against relegation rivals Newport County on 24 March 2012. He played in all 51 of Lincoln's matches during the season, as the club struggled to adapt during their first season back in non-League, finishing just above the relegation places.

He was made club captain ahead of the 2012–13 season and continued to play regularly during the early months of the new season. He scored his first goal of the season from a free-kick in a 3–3 home draw against Stockport County on 27 October 2012. Nutter later stated that his family struggled relocating to Lincolnshire, and a move back down south better suited his personal circumstances. He made 66 appearances for Lincoln, scoring three goals. On his time at Lincoln, Nutter stated: "Lincoln is a really nice, friendly club with very patient and loyal supporters. But with my personal circumstances, it was time to move on, I wish them well".

=== Woking ===
He joined fellow Conference Premier club Woking on a two-month loan deal on 15 November 2012. He made his first appearance for Woking two days after signing, playing the whole match in a 2–1 defeat to Alfreton Town at Kingfield, and made a further four appearances during the loan agreement. He briefly returned to Lincoln, before it was agreed that he would leave the club by mutual consent at the end of 2012. Nutter subsequently signed for Woking on a permanent basis on 6 January 2013. He was ever-present at left-back for the remainder of the season, adding 17 further appearances to his five loan appearances as Woking finished their first season back in the Conference in mid-table. Nutter remained at Woking for the 2013–14 season, making his first appearance of the season against his former employers, Lincoln City, in a 0–0 draw at Kingfield on 10 August 2013. He scored his first and only goal for Woking in a 2–0 away win at Gateshead on 15 February 2014, converting Kevin Betsy's cross early in the match to help secure the club's first away win of the calendar year. He was a mainstay in the team throughout the season, making 50 appearances in all competitions.

Out of contract heading into the 2014–15 season, Nutter held discussions with manager Garry Hill and coach Steven Thompson, after which he signed a contract extension with Woking on non-contract terms in August 2014. The arrangement allowed him to combine part-time football with his new career as a teacher. He also thanked the club for their understanding during the transition, particularly following the recent death of his mother. Nutter started in the club's first game of the season, a 3–1 away victory at Alfreton Town on 9 August 2014. He played a largely peripheral role during the season, making seven appearances in all competitions as his work commitments limited first-team opportunities. Nutter retired at the end of the season to focus fully on his teaching career.

== International career ==
Nutter earned three caps for the England C team, who represent England at non-League level, in 2007. He also made several appearances for the England futsal team.

== Style of play ==
Nutter predominantly played as a left-sided full-back, although he was also utilised on the left wing in the early stages of his career. He is left-footed. Gillingham manager Mark Stimson described him as "an attacking full-back with plenty of technical ability" and stated that Nutter would "offer plenty of width down the left-hand side", making him "a constant attacking threat". He expressed a preference for keeping the ball on the ground, favouring passing the ball out from the back over playing long balls. Talking about his time at Stevenage, Nutter stated he would like to be remembered as a player "who tried to play football the right way, passing the ball, technically good to watch and an honest player".

He also provided an attacking outlet from set-pieces. Throughout his career, Nutter scored several long-range free-kicks, and also regularly took corner kicks. During his time at Stevenage, he was the club's primary penalty taker, converting six out of seven penalties.

== Personal life ==
Nutter is married to Hayley and, as of 2011, they had two sons, Walter and Benedict. Walter plays for the Chelsea F.C. Academy. Nutter has a brother and a sister; his brother, Tom, played semi-professional football for Burnham and Beaconsfield SYCOB, as well as spending four years playing in the United States for West Texas A&M University.

Nutter studied Sports Psychology and Coaching at the University of Buckingham and began teaching physical education, science, and history at the Papplewick School in Ascot in the summer of 2014.

== Career statistics ==
Appearances and goals by club, season and competition
Club	Season	League			FA Cup		League Cup		Other		Total	
Club	Season	Division	Apps	Goals	Apps	Goals	Apps	Goals	Apps	Goals	Apps	Goals
Wycombe Wanderers	2000–01	Division Two	1	0	0	0	0	0	0	0	1	0
Aldershot Town	2001–02	Isthmian League Premier Division	17	2	2	0	—		6 (Note: Three appearances in Isthmian League Cup; three appearances in Hampshire Senior Cup)	0	25	2
Aldershot Town	2002–03	Isthmian League Premier Division	20	3	1	0	—		2 (Note: Appearances in Hampshire Senior Cup)	0	23	3
Aldershot Town	2003–04	Conference National	21	0	0	0	—		10 (Note: Five appearances and one goal in FA Trophy; two appearances in Hampshire Senior Cup; one appearance in Isthmian Charity Shield, two appearances in 2004 Conference National play-offs)	1	31	1
Aldershot Town	Total		58	5	3	0	0	0	18	1	79	6
St Albans City (loan)	2001–02	Isthmian League Premier Division	7	0	—		—		1 (Note: Appearance in Billy Minter Trophy)	0	8	0
Gravesend & Northfleet (loan)	2002–03	Conference National	4	0	—		—		0	0	4	0
Grays Athletic	2004–05	Conference South	37	1	1	0	—		14 (Note: Nine appearances in FA Trophy; four appearances and one goal in Conference League Cup; one appearances in Essex Senior Cup)	1	52	2
Grays Athletic	2005–06	Conference National	40	0	3	0	—		11 (Note: Nine appearances in FA Trophy; two appearances and one goal in 2006 Conference National play-offs)	1	54	1
Grays Athletic	Total		77	1	4	0	0	0	25	2	106	3
Stevenage Borough	2006–07	Conference National	46	6	2	0	—		8 (Note: Appearances in FA Trophy)	0	56	6
Stevenage Borough	2007–08	Conference Premier	14	2	3	0	—		0	0	17	2
Stevenage Borough	Total		60	8	5	0	0	0	8	0	73	8
Gillingham (loan)	2007–08	League One	3	0	—		—		0	0	3	0
Gillingham	2007–08	League One	21	1	—		—		1 (Note: Appearance(s) in Football League Trophy)	0	22	1
Gillingham	2008–09	League Two	45	0	4	0	1	0	4 (Note: One appearance in Football League Trophy; three appearances in 2009 League Two play-offs)	0	54	0
Gillingham	2009–10	League One	35	1	3	0	2	0	1	0	41	1
Gillingham	2010–11	League Two	34	1	1	0	1	0	1	0	37	1
Gillingham	Total		138	3	8	0	4	0	7	0	157	3
Lincoln City	2011–12	Conference Premier	46	2	2	0	—		3	0	51	2
Lincoln City	2012–13	Conference Premier	12	1	3	0	—		0	0	15	1
Lincoln City	Total		58	3	5	0	0	0	3	0	66	3
Woking (loan)	2012–13	Conference Premier	5	0	—		—		2	0	7	0
Woking	2012–13	Conference Premier	17	0	—		—		0	0	17	0
Woking	2013–14	Conference Premier	43	1	1	0	—		6 (Note: Two appearances in FA Trophy; four appearances in Surrey Senior Cup)	0	50	1
Woking	2014–15	Conference Premier	5	0	0	0	—		2	0	7	0
Woking	Total		70	1	1	0	0	0	10	0	81	1
Career total			473	21	26	0	4	0	72	3	574	24

== Honours ==
Aldershot Town

- Isthmian League Premier Division: 2002–03

Grays Athletic

- Conference South: 2004–05
- FA Trophy: 2004–05, 2005–06

Stevenage Borough

- FA Trophy: 2006–07

Gillingham

- Football League Two play-offs: 2009
