= Josh Wright =

English footballer (born 1989)

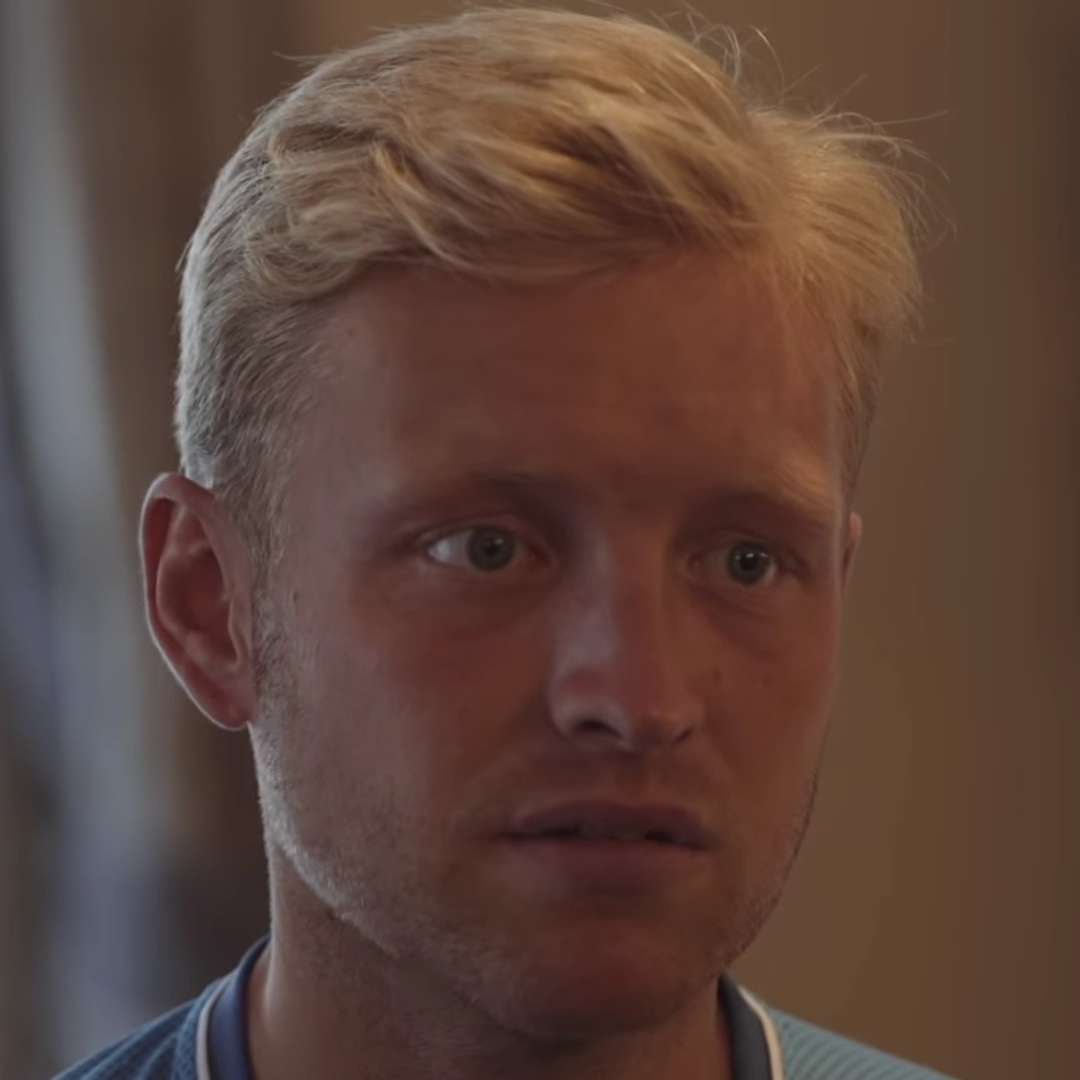
- Wright in July 2018

Personal information
- Full name: Joshua William Wright
- Date of birth: 6 November 1989 (age 37)
- Place of birth: Bethnal Green, England
- Height: 5 ft 9 in (1.75 m)
- Position: Midfielder

Team information
- Current team: Ebbsfleet United (manager)

Youth career
- –2007: Charlton Athletic

Senior career*
Years	Team	Apps	(Gls)
2007–2009	Charlton Athletic	2	(0)
2007–2008	→ Barnet (loan)	32	(1)
2008	→ Brentford (loan)	5	(0)
2009	→ Gillingham (loan)	8	(0)
2009–2011	Scunthorpe United	71	(0)
2011–2015	Millwall	46	(1)
2013	→ Leyton Orient (loan)	2	(0)
2014	→ Crawley Town (loan)	4	(0)
2014–2015	→ Leyton Orient (loan)	9	(0)
2015	Leyton Orient	20	(2)
2015–2017	Gillingham	85	(14)
2017–2018	Southend United	23	(1)
2018–2019	Bradford City	18	(0)
2019–2021	Leyton Orient	44	(9)
2021	Crawley Town	20	(0)
2021–2022	Billericay Town	25	(1)
2022–2025	Ebbsfleet United	89	(4)
Total		503	(33)

International career
2005	England U16	4	(0)
2005–2006	England U17	9	(0)
2007	England U18	1	(0)
2007–2008	England U19	4	(0)

Managerial career
- 2024: Ebbsfleet United (caretaker)
- 2024–: Ebbsfleet United
- * Club domestic league appearances and goals

Joshua William Wright (born 6 November 1989) is an English football coach and former professional footballer who is the manager of National League South club Ebbsfleet United.

Wright played as a midfielder for Gillingham between 2015 and 2017, Millwall from 2011 to 2015 and Scunthorpe United between 2009 and 2011. He began his career at Charlton Athletic at the age of 17 in 2007, but spent the majority of his two years there on loan at Barnet, Brentford and Gillingham.

== Club career ==
=== Charlton Athletic ===
Born in Bethnal Green, London, Wright started his football career at Charlton Athletic, with whom he signed a two-year professional contract in April 2007 at the age of 17 alongside close friend Harry Arter. Before joining Charlton's academy full-time at the age of 16, he attended Chigwell School in Chigwell, and Roding Valley High School in Loughton, Essex. Fellow professionals Lee Sawyer and Billy Lumley also attended Roding Valley High School, while Jordan Spence was in the same year group as Wright at Chigwell. He plays in midfield as a playmaker.

In August of that year, Wright moved to Barnet on loan for what eventually amounted to three months. After a successful spell, which saw him score his first ever goal against Stockport County and be named Barnet's player of the month for November, he returned to Charlton. A month later, he was re-signed on loan by Barnet for the remainder of the 2007–08 season.

On 19 September 2008, Wright was signed by League Two side Brentford on a month's loan. The loan was extended but soon after Alan Pardew decided to call Wright back due to an injury crisis at the club, where he made an impressive display for Brentford under the management of Andy Scott.

Following his return from a loan spell at Brentford, he made his debut for Charlton in a 1–1 draw against Burnley on 25 October 2008, where he was started for the match. He then joined Gillingham on loan in March 2009 until the end of the season.

He made his debut for Gillingham on 4 April 2009 in the 2–0 home defeat to Barnet. His four appearances at Gillingham impressed Mark Stimson that he extended Wright's loan spell with Gillingham, which allowed him to play in the play-offs. Wright was responsible for the corner kick that allowed striker Simeon Jackson to score in the 2009 Football League Two play-off final at Wembley Stadium, sending Gillingham to Football League One for the 2009–10 campaign. Despite making his best efforts for Gillingham, Charlton weren't convinced of Wright and instead released him upon his contract expiring.

=== Scunthorpe United ===
He signed for Scunthorpe United in July 2009 on a two-year contract. Upon joining Scunthorpe United, Wright revealed he turned down a move to big clubs in order to join Scunthorpe United and was motivated to join the Iron for first team football.

Wright made his debut for the club, where he came on as a substitute for Gary Hooper in the 49th minute, in a 4–0 loss against Cardiff City in the opening game of the season. Since his debut, Wright quickly made an impact for the club and established himself in the starting eleven "as the holding player in United's four-man midfield." In his first season, Wright made thirty-five appearances for the club.

In his second season at Scunthorpe United, Wright started his season when he scored his first goal for the club in a Football League Cup game against Manchester United on 22 September 2010. After the match, Wright said he is more than pleased to score his first goal which he cited as a "long time coming". Wright started well for the club until his playing time minutes significantly decreased later in the season. In the January transfer window, Wright requested a transfer, during which he was offered a new contract and prepared for his exit from Scunthorpe United. This came after Reading were keen to sign him and he was keen to move down to the south. However, his father stated that Wright would be unlikely to move to the club in the January transfer window, but would leave in the summer. After the failed transfer move in the January transfer window, Wright expected to be back in the first team and earn playing time, as well as withdrawing his transfer request. Unfortunately, his loss of form and a foot injury that kept him out for the rest of 2010–11 season cost him his first team place. Despite the loss of form costing him his first team place, Wright, nevertheless, made thirty-six appearances for the club.

At the end of the 2010–11 season, Wright was one of seven players released by Scunthorpe in May 2011. At the time, Wright was once linked again to a number of Championship clubs, having held discussions.

=== Millwall ===
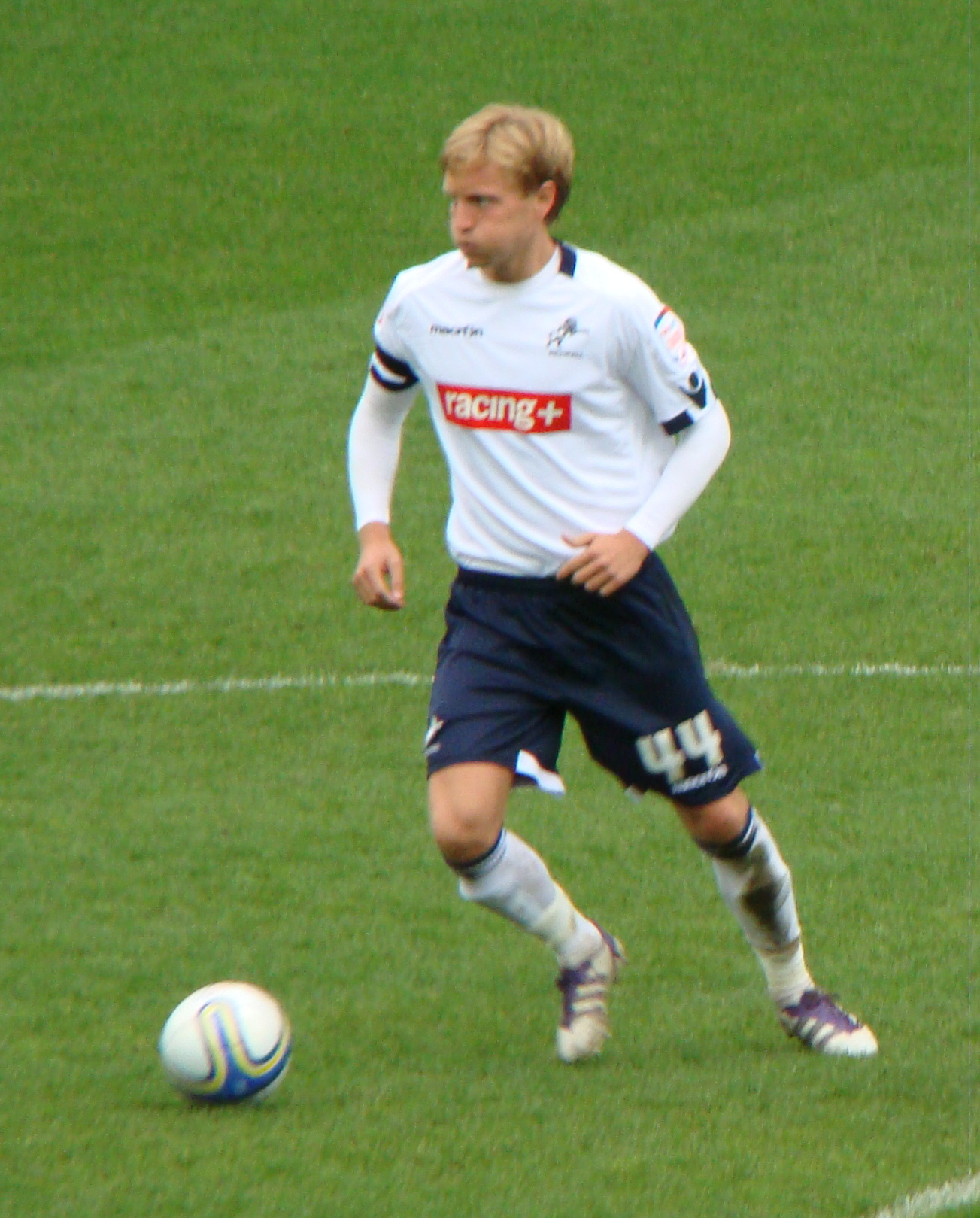
Wright playing for Millwall in 2012

After leaving Scunthorpe, Wright suffered a foot injury ahead of the 2011–12 season, which prevented him from joining a new club. In November 2011, he joined Championship side Millwall on a free transfer following a successful trial period. The club signed Wright on a "short-term deal running until the January 2012 transfer window".

On 3 January 2012, Wright made his debut for Millwall against Bristol City and made his first start before coming off for Jimmy Abdou in the 67th minute of a 1–0 loss. Millwall subsequently extended his contract until the end of the season. On 25 February 2012, Wright scored his first goal with a 30-yard volley in a 3–1 win over Burnley. His 30-yard volley against Burnley earned him awards.

His performance at Millwall led the club to offer him a new contract on a long-term deal. At the end of the season, Wright went on to sign a new three-year deal, keeping him until 2015.

During the 2012–13 season, Wright switched his shirt number from forty-four to number four. However, his second season did not go so well for him, as he was overlooked and mostly featured on the substitute bench. On 19 November 2013, Wright signed on loan for Leyton Orient. After making two appearances, Wright was recalled by Millwall due to an injury crisis at the club.

Wright joined Crawley Town on a 93-day loan deal on 9 September 2014. He made his debut for Crawley in their 1–0 home victory over Fleetwood Town on 13 September. He made 4 appearances in total for Crawley Town.

=== Leyton Orient ===
During a second loan spell with Leyton Orient, Wright's contract with Millwall was cancelled on 5 January 2015 to enable him to negotiate a permanent move to another club. He re-signed for Leyton Orient the following day.

=== Gillingham ===
Wright rejoined Gillingham in August 2015 on a short-term contract. The following month he signed a new deal to extend his time with the club until the end of the season. On 29 June 2016, he signed a new two-year deal with the club.

At the beginning of the 2016–17 season, Wright was named captain by then-manager Justin Edinburgh. However, after Edinburgh was sacked and Adrian Pennock became manager, defender Max Ehmer was named captain.

On 11 March 2017, in a League One fixture Wright scored a 9-minute hat trick of penalties against his former side Scunthorpe United. In doing so, he became the first player to score a hat trick of penalties in an English (top four tiers) league game since Alan Slough for Peterborough United in a 4–3 loss at Chester on 29 April 1978.

On 22 April 2017, he was named the club's player of the season, players' player of the season and the away supporters' player of the season.

=== Southend United ===
In August 2017, Wright's contract with Gillingham was terminated and he subsequently signed for Southend United. He scored his first goal for the club in a 2-0 EFL Trophy win against Colchester United on 7 November 2017.

At the end of the 2017–18 season, he was released by the club.

=== Bradford City ===
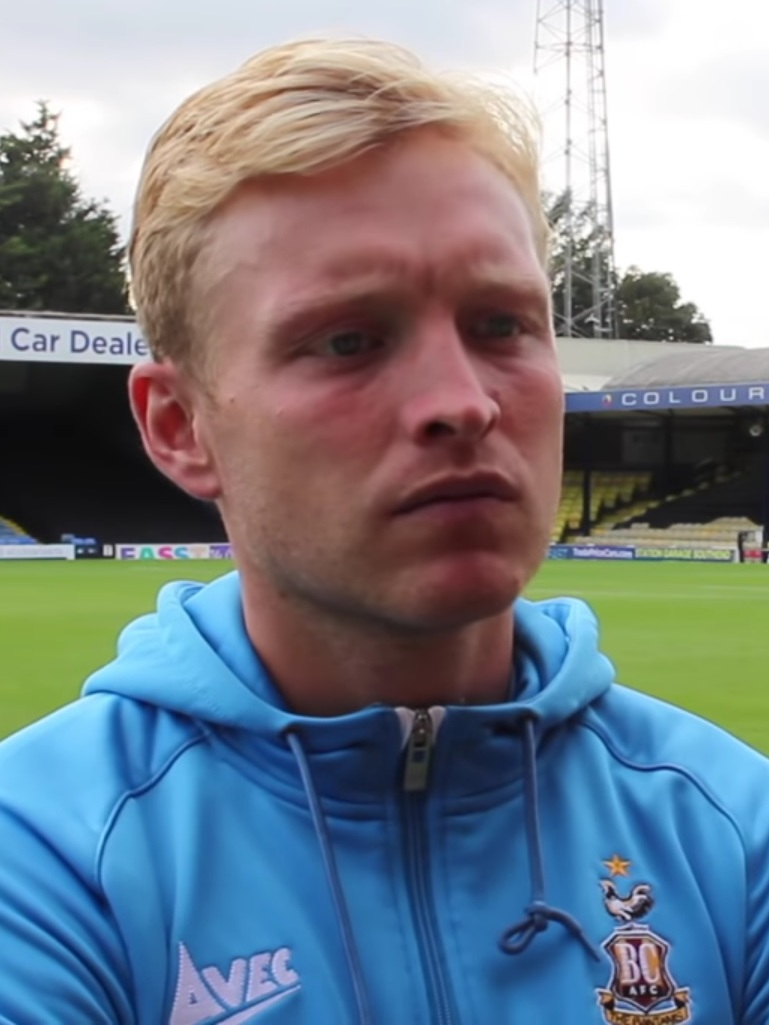
Wright with Bradford City in August 2018

In May 2018, it was announced that Wright would sign for Bradford City on 1 July 2018. He was appointed club captain on 1 August 2018. He was later stripped of the captaincy, and dropped from the first-team, not making a start for five months until 13 March 2019, after which his attitude was praised by new manager Gary Bowyer.

=== Return to Leyton Orient ===
In June 2019, Wright re-joined Leyton Orient. He was the final player to be signed by manager Justin Edinburgh, who died on 8 June. On 7 January 2021, the club announced that he had left by mutual consent.

=== Crawley Town ===
In January 2021, he returned to Crawley Town on a two-and-a-half-year deal to play alongside brother Mark. On 3 September 2021, it was announced that he had left the club after his contract was terminated by mutual consent.

=== Billericay Town ===
On 26 November 2021, Wright signed for National League South side Billericay Town as player/coach.

=== Ebbsfleet United ===
On 23 June 2022, Wright signed for Ebbsfleet United, also of the National League South.

== International career ==
Wright made his debut for his country at U16 level against Japan in March 2005. Since then, he has represented England at the U17, U18 and, most recently, U19 levels. He was captain of the U17 side on several occasions, having previously captained the U16 team.

== Managerial career ==
On 11 December 2024, following the sacking of Harry Watling, Wright was appointed manager of Ebbsfleet United.

Wright was awarded the Enterprise National League South Manager of the Month award for December 2025, having overseen three successive wins in the league and progress in the FA Trophy.

== Personal life ==
Son of Carol and Mark Wright, Sr., Wright is the brother of The Only Way Is Essex stars Mark and Jess Wright, and has a younger sister. His grandmother was 'Nanny Pat'. In 2017, he became engaged to girlfriend Hollie Kane. They married in 2018 and live in Essex. They have two sons, born in 2022 and 2023.

== Career statistics ==
=== As a player ===
As of match played 10 December 2024

Appearances and goals by club, season and competition
Club	Season	League			FA Cup		League Cup		Other		Total	
Club	Season	Division	Apps	Goals	Apps	Goals	Apps	Goals	Apps	Goals	Apps	Goals
Charlton Athletic	2007–08	Championship	0	0	0	0	0	0	0	0	0	0
Charlton Athletic	2008–09	Championship	2	0	1	0	0	0	0	0	3	0
Charlton Athletic	Charlton Athletic total		2	0	1	0	0	0	0	0	3	0
Barnet (loan)	2007–08	League Two	32	1	3	0	0	0	0	0	35	1
Brentford (loan)	2008–09	League Two	5	0	0	0	0	0	1 (Note: Appearance(s) in the Football League Trophy)	0	6	0
Gillingham (loan)	2008–09	League Two	8	0	0	0	0	0	0	0	8	0
Scunthorpe United	2009–10	Championship	35	0	2	0	4	0	0	0	41	0
Scunthorpe United	2010–11	Championship	36	0	0	0	3	1	0	0	39	1
Scunthorpe United	Scunthorpe United total		71	0	2	0	7	1	0	0	80	1
Millwall	2011–12	Championship	18	1	3	0	0	0	0	0	21	1
Millwall	2012–13	Championship	24	0	1	0	1	0	0	0	26	0
Millwall	2013–14	Championship	3	0	0	0	1	0	0	0	4	0
Millwall	2014–15	Championship	1	0	0	0	1	0	0	0	2	0
Millwall	Millwall total		46	1	4	0	3	0	0	0	53	1
Leyton Orient (loan)	2013–14	League One	2	0	0	0	0	0	0	0	2	0
Crawley Town (loan)	2014–15	League One	4	0	0	0	0	0	0	0	4	0
Leyton Orient (loan)	2014–15	League One	9	0	1	0	0	0	2	0	12	0
Leyton Orient	2014–15	League One	20	2	0	0	0	0	0	0	20	2
Gillingham	2015–16	League One	41	1	0	0	2	0	1	0	44	1
Gillingham	2016–17	League One	41	13	2	0	3	0	1 (Note: Appearance(s) in the EFL Trophy)	1	47	14
Gillingham	2017–18	League One	3	0	0	0	1	0	0	0	4	0
Gillingham	Gillingham total		85	14	2	0	6	0	2	1	95	15
Southend United	2017–18	League One	23	1	1	0	0	0	2	1	26	2
Bradford City	2018–19	League One	18	0	1	0	1	0	2	0	22	0
Leyton Orient	2019–20	League Two	35	8	1	0	1	0	1	0	38	8
Leyton Orient	2020–21	League Two	9	1	0	0	2	0	4	0	15	1
Leyton Orient	Leyton Orient total		44	9	1	0	3	0	5	0	53	9
Crawley Town	2020–21	League Two	20	0	2	0	0	0	0	0	22	0
Billericay Town	2021–22	National League South	25	1	0	0	0	0	3 (Note: Appearances in the FA Trophy) (Note: Appearances in the Essex Senior Cup)	0	28	1
Ebbsfleet United	2022–23	National League South	24	2	1	0	0	0	0	0	25	2
Ebbsfleet United	2023–24	National League	45	1	1	0	—		0	0	46	1
Ebbsfleet United	2024–25	National League	20	1	1	0	—		1 (Note: Appearances in the National League Cup)	0	22	1
Ebbsfleet United	Ebbsfleet United total		89	4	3	0	0	0	1	0	93	4
Career total			503	33	21	0	20	1	18	2	562	36

=== As a manager ===
As of 4 April 2026

Managerial record by team and tenure
Team	From	To	Record				
Team	From	To	P	W	D	L	Win %
Ebbsfleet United (caretaker)	9 September 2024	12 September 2024	1	0	1	0	0.0
Ebbsfleet United	11 December 2024	Present	79	29	19	31	36.7
Total			80	29	20	31	36.3

== Honours ==
Gillingham

- Football League Two play-offs: 2009

Billericay Town

- Essex Senior Cup: 2021–22

Ebbsfleet United

- National League South: 2022–23

Individual

- Gillingham Player of the Season: 2016–17
- Millwall Goal of the Season: 2011–12
