= 2006 FA Trophy final =

2006 FA Trophy Final
- Event: 2005-06 FA Trophy
Grays Athletic	Woking
2	0
- Date: 14 May 2006
- Venue: Boleyn Ground, London
- Referee: Howard Webb
- Attendance: 13,997

The 2006 FA Trophy Final, was the final match of the 2005-06 FA Trophy. It was the 37th season of the competition for teams from the Conference and other semi-professional teams below this level. The match was held on Sunday 14 May 2006 at Boleyn Ground, London, and was contested by Grays Athletic and Woking. Both sides had won all their previous appearances in the FA Trophy Final. Woking had previously won the competition in 1994, 1995 & 1997. Grays entered this game as holders of the Trophy winning the 2005 final.

Goals from Dennis Oli (41st minute) and Glenn Poole (45th minute) in front of 13,997 spectators secured a 2–0 victory for Grays, who became only the fourth side to retain the FA Trophy.
