= Rene Steer =

English footballer

Personal information
- Full name: Rene Alexander Steer
- Date of birth: 31 January 1990 (age 36)
- Place of birth: Luton, England
- Position: Left back

Youth career
- 2003–2007: Arsenal

Senior career*
Years	Team	Apps	(Gls)
2007–2009	Arsenal	0	(0)
2009	→ Gillingham (loan)	5	(0)
2009–2010	Oldham Athletic	0	(0)
2010–2011	Staines Town	35	(0)
2011–2012	St Neots Town	30	(1)
2013	Woking	0	(0)
2013	St Neots Town	11	(0)
2013–2015	Boston United	66	(2)
2015–2020	Maidenhead United	159	(0)
2020	Hampton & Richmond Borough	3	(0)
2021	Hemel Hempstead Town	3	(0)
Total		312	(3)
- * Club domestic league appearances and goals

Rene Alexander Steer (born 31 January 1990) is an English retired footballer who played as a left back. He previously played for Arsenal, Gillingham, Oldham Athletic, Staines Town, St Neots Town, Woking, Maidenhead United, Hampton & Richmond Borough and Hemel Hempstead Town.

== Career ==
=== Arsenal ===
Steer began his career in the Arsenal Academy, joining the club at age 13. In the 2006–07 season, he made 11 appearances for the Arsenal Reserves. During the 2007–08 season, he made 12 appearances for the reserves, and another 11 appearances for the Under-18 team. He signed a professional contract with the club on 10 September 2007. He received his first first-team call-up on 2 December 2008 as an unused substitute in Arsenal's 2–0 League Cup defeat to Burnley, as well as two appearances in the Premier Reserve League in the first half of the 2008–09 season. During his time for the club's reserves, he also made several appearances in the FA Youth Cup, including a good performance in a 2–2 draw versus Bristol City, before making a decisive shot in the penalty shootout. He was included in the first team in October 2008 in the Premier League for nine matches.

=== Gillingham ===
On 22 January 2009, Steer was loaned out to Gillingham for four months. On 7 February, he made his debut for the club as he came on as a substitute in the 78th minute, in a 2–0 loss to Bradford City. He made his first start for the club in a 4–4 draw versus Aldershot Town on 18 February. He returned to Arsenal in April 2009 following the end of his loan, but was released by the club in June.

=== Oldham Athletic ===
Steer signed a 12-month contract with League One club Oldham Athletic on 24 June 2009, following a successful trial. On 17 August, he was sent to hospital following a training session, during which time he received an elbow to the face. Later that day he underwent a successful operation on his jaw at North Manchester General Hospital to repair and correct "serious damage" to his teeth. Steer was released at the end of the 2009–10 season.

=== Non-league ===
After his release by Oldham, Steer dropped into non-League and signed for Conference South club Staines Town and then in September 2011, he joined St Neots Town in the Southern League Division One Central. In February 2013 he signed forms for Woking, but a serious injury kept him out of football for most of that season. His only appearance for the Cards came in the Surrey Senior Cup exit against Godalming Town on 4 March 2013. In August 2013 he re-signed for St Neots Town. In September 2013, he scored from 40 yards in an FA Cup tie against Canvey Island. Steer then joined Boston United before signing for Maidenhead United in the summer of 2015. After five seasons, Steer left the Magpies at the end of the 2019–20 season. He joined Hampton & Richmond Borough on 20 August 2020, before departing in November after being unable to hold down a starting spot. Steer joined Hemel Hempstead Town in February 2021.

== Career statistics ==
As of match played 16 February 2021

Appearances and goals by club, season and competition
Club	Season	League			FA Cup		League Cup		Other		Total	
Club	Season	Division	Apps	Goals	Apps	Goals	Apps	Goals	Apps	Goals	Apps	Goals
Arsenal	2008–09	Premier League	0	0	0	0	0	0	0	0	0	0
Gillingham (loan)	2008–09	League Two	5	0	0	0	0	0	0	0	5	0
Oldham Athletic	2009–10	League One	0	0	0	0	0	0	0	0	0	0
Staines Town	2010–11	Conference South	35	0	1	0	—		0	0	36	0
St Neots Town	2011–12	SFL – Division 1 Central	30	1	0	0	—		6 (Note: Two appearances in the FA Trophy, one in the Huntingdonshire Senior Cup; three appearances and a goal in the Hinchinbrooke Cup)	1	36	2
Woking	2012–13	Conference Premier	0	0	0	0	—		1 (Note: Appearance in the Surrey Senior Cup)	0	1	0
St Neots Town	2013–14	SFL – Premier Division	11	0	3	1	—		0	0	14	1
Boston United	2013–14	Conference North	26	0	0	0	—		2 (Note: Appearances in the FA Trophy)	0	28	0
Boston United	2014–15	Conference North	40	2	0	0	—		2	0	42	2
Boston United	Total		66	2	0	0	0	0	4	0	70	2
Maidenhead United	2015–16	National League South	28	0	3	0	—		0	0	31	0
Maidenhead United	2016–17	National League South	37	0	1	0	—		3 (Note: Two appearances in the FA Trophy and one in the Berks & Bucks Senior Cup)	0	41	0
Maidenhead United	2017–18	National League	32	0	1	0	—		4	0	37	0
Maidenhead United	2018–19	National League	36	0	2	0	—		1	0	39	0
Maidenhead United	2019–20	National League	26	0	1	0	—		2	0	29	0
Maidenhead United	Total		159	0	8	0	0	0	10	0	178	0
Hampton & Richmond Borough	2020–21	National League South	3	0	4	0	—		0	0	7	0
Hemel Hempstead Town	2020–21	National League South	3	0	0	0	—		0	0	3	0
Career total			312	3	16	1	0	0	21	1	349	5
