= Mark Stimson =

Footballer; football manager (born 1967)

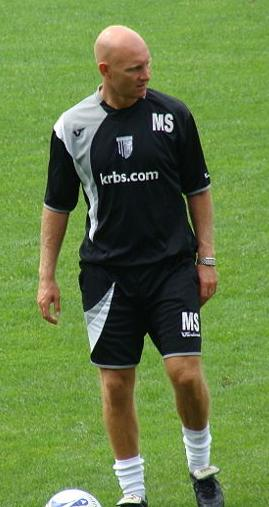
- Mark Stimson

Personal information
- Full name: Mark Nicholas Stimson
- Date of birth: 27 December 1967 (age 58)
- Place of birth: Plaistow, England
- Height: 5 ft 11 in (1.80 m)
- Position: Defender

Team information
- Current team: Cray Wanderers (assistant manager)

Youth career
- ?–1984: Queens Park Rangers
- 1984–1985: Tottenham Hotspur

Senior career*
Years	Team	Apps	(Gls)
1985–1989	Tottenham Hotspur	2	(0)
1988	→ Leyton Orient (loan)	10	(0)
1989	→ Gillingham (loan)	18	(0)
1989–1993	Newcastle United	86	(2)
1992	→ Portsmouth (loan)	4	(0)
1993–1996	Portsmouth	58	(2)
1995	→ Barnet (loan)	5	(0)
1996–1999	Southend United	57	(0)
1999	Leyton Orient	2	(0)
1999–2002	Canvey Island	?	(?)
2002–2004	Grays Athletic	?	(?)
2017–2018	Thurrock	0	(0)

International career
2002	England National Game XI	1	(0)

Managerial career
- 2002–2006: Grays Athletic
- 2006–2007: Stevenage Borough
- 2007–2010: Gillingham
- 2010–2011: Barnet
- 2011–2012: Kettering Town
- 2012–2018: Thurrock
- 2018: Waltham Abbey
- 2018–2023: Hornchurch
- 2023: Grays Athletic
- 2023–2024: Margate
- * Club domestic league appearances and goals

Mark Nicholas Stimson (born 27 December 1967) is an English former footballer and manager. He is currently assistant manager of Cray Wanderers. He signed his first professional contract with Tottenham Hotspur in 1985, but was unable to gain a regular place in the team. In 1989, he moved on to Newcastle United, where he made over 80 appearances in the Football League. He later played for Portsmouth, Southend United and Leyton Orient before dropping into non-League football.

He was appointed manager of Grays Athletic in 2002 and remained in charge until 2006 when he took over as manager of Stevenage Borough. He led Grays to victory in the Final of the FA Trophy in 2005 and 2006, and repeated the feat with Stevenage in 2007. In November 2007, he became manager of a Football League team for the first time when he took over at one of his former clubs, Gillingham, but he was unable to prevent the club's relegation from League One at the end of the 2007–08 season. He led Gillingham back into League One the following season via the League Two play-off final, but his contract was terminated after the team was relegated back to League Two the following season. On 1 June 2010, Stimson was appointed as the new manager of League Two club Barnet, but he was sacked on New Year's Day 2011 with the club near the bottom of the table. He later had a spell as manager with Conference club Kettering Town. He led Hornchurch to the 2021 FA Trophy Final at Wembley Stadium, beating Hereford 3–1.

== Playing career ==
Born in Plaistow in east London, Stimson played for the Essex county representative football team and was on the books of Queens Park Rangers, before joining Tottenham Hotspur on an apprenticeship in July 1984. A year later, he signed his first professional contract, at the age of 17. He made his Football League debut against Everton in May 1987, but struggled to gain a place in the first team, and was sent to Leyton Orient on loan in March 1988, where he played ten times. During the following season, he was loaned out again, this time to Gillingham, whose manager, Keith Burkinshaw, had worked with him at Tottenham. Stimson made 18 appearances for the Kent-based club and, although he was unable to help the team avoid relegation from the Third Division, his contribution impressed the fans, who voted him into second place in the club's Player of the Year ballot.

At the end of the 1988–89 season, Stimson was transferred to Newcastle United, then in the Second Division, for a fee of £200,000. He spent four years with the club and finally gained a regular first team place, making over 80 appearances. After Kevin Keegan took over as manager, however, Stimson found himself out of favour and he had a short spell on loan to Portsmouth in December 1992, which led to a £100,000 transfer at the end of that season. He made over fifty appearances for Portsmouth but was also loaned out again, this time to Barnet during the early part of the 1995–96 season. In March 1996, he was transferred to Southend United for a fee of £25,000. His first season at the club was affected by a long lay-off due to injury, meaning that he did not play between August and November, but he ultimately made over 50 Football League appearances for the club. During his time at Roots Hall the club suffered two consecutive relegations, dropping from the First Division into the Second Division in 1997 and from there into the Third Division in 1998. In March 1999, having not played for Southend since the previous November, he returned to his former club Leyton Orient on a free transfer. He played for the club in the semi-finals of the play-offs, but was restricted to an appearance as an unused substitute in the final, which Orient lost.

Prior to the 1999–2000 season, Stimson spent a short period on trial at another of his former clubs, Gillingham, but manager Peter Taylor decided against offering him a contract and he instead joined Isthmian League club Canvey Island. He helped the "Gulls" win the FA Trophy in the 2000–01 season, setting up the only goal and winning the man of the match award in Canvey's 1–0 defeat of Forest Green Rovers in the final. He was also selected to play for the England National Game XI, the national team for semi-professional players, earning one cap against an equivalent team from the United States. He left Canvey in May 2002 to join Grays Athletic as player-coach.

== Managerial career ==
In September 2002, Stimson took over as manager of Grays after the sacking of Craig Edwards, initially as caretaker manager, but after leading the team to its first victory of the season, he was quickly given the job on an ongoing basis. Despite the signing of a number of former top-level players, such as Carl Leaburn and Jason Dozzell, the team escaped relegation by only one point. The following season, however, boosted by a switch to full-time professional status and helped by the goals of Freddy Eastwood, Grays finished in 6th place, sufficient to gain a place in the newly formed Conference South for the 2004–05 season. Grays won the Conference South at the first attempt by a margin of 23 points, thus achieving promotion to the Conference National, the top level of non-league football, for the first time in their history. In the same season, Stimson also led Grays to the FA Trophy Final, where the team beat Hucknall Town in a penalty shoot-out. Grays reached the FA Trophy Final again in the following season, and claimed a second successive win after a 2–0 victory over Woking at Upton Park. In the Conference, Grays finished in third place and qualified for the play-offs for promotion to the Football League, but lost to Halifax Town in the semi-finals.

Citing his disappointment at failing to gain promotion, Stimson resigned from his post at Grays on 16 May 2006. He stated that at the time he had received no firm job offers from other clubs, and acknowledged that he was taking a gamble with his career, but said that if he was unable to find a new job as a manager he would move into youth coaching or open his own football school. He was linked with the managerial vacancy at League Two Peterborough United, but eventually took over as manager of Stevenage Borough on 28 May, and led the club to an eighth-place finish in the Conference National in his first season in charge. Stevenage also defeated Stimson's former club Grays to reach the FA Trophy final, and beat Kidderminster Harriers 3–2 at the new Wembley Stadium in the final, giving Stimson a third consecutive Trophy win as a manager.

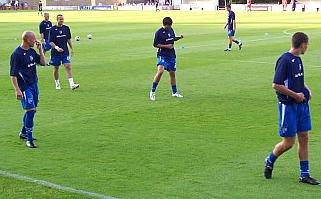
Stimson (far left) leading the warm-up before a Gillingham match in 2008

In the early part of the 2007–08 season, speculation began to mount that Stimson would be approached to take over as manager of a Football League club, with Gillingham, Port Vale and Millwall all alleged to be interested in his services. He was offered a new contract by Stevenage on 16 October 2007, but resigned the following day. On 1 November, he was appointed as the new manager of Gillingham, and quickly moved to sign a number of Stevenage players, including Adam Miller and John Nutter. He was unable to recreate his previous success, however, and at the end of the 2007–08 season Gillingham were relegated from League One. He was also criticised by departing player Aaron Brown, who acknowledged that Stimson had strong coaching skills but described his man-management as "shocking". The following season the Gills finished fifth in League Two and beat Shrewsbury Town 1–0 in the play-off final at Wembley Stadium to gain promotion, but in the 2009–10 season Gillingham were relegated back to League Two, after which Stimson's contract was terminated "by mutual consent" on 10 May 2010.

On 1 June, Stimson was appointed as the new manager of League Two club Barnet, but was sacked seven months later on 1 January 2011 due to a bad string of results which left the club near the bottom of the table. Towards the latter stages of the 2010–11 season, Stimson accepted a coaching role at Dagenham & Redbridge. After a brief spell at Dagenham, he was appointed manager of Conference National club Kettering Town on 7 September 2011. On 4 January 2012, Stimson left Kettering with the team placed in the Conference relegation places. Four months later he was appointed manager of Thurrock following the club's relegation to the Isthmian League. At the age of 49, Stimson was registered as a player again for the 2017–18 season and named himself as a substitute on a number of occasions.

On 10 May 2018, after leaving Thurrock as a result of the club folding, Stimson was appointed manager of Waltham Abbey. In November of the same year, however, he resigned in order to take over as manager of AFC Hornchurch. He led the club to the 2021 FA Trophy Final at Wembley Stadium, beating Hereford 3–1.

After leaving Hornchurch at the end of the 2022–23 season, Stimson returned to Grays Athletic for the upcoming season, but he was sacked in November with the club lying second from bottom in the Isthmian League North Division. The following month he was appointed manager of Margate. Having been unable to prevent the club from being relegated, Stimson was dismissed from his role at the end of the season.

In April 2025, Stimson was appointed assistant manager of Isthmian League Premier Division side Cray Wanderers for the 2025–26 season.

== Personal life ==
Stimson is married, and when he returned to former club Grays Athletic as manager of Stevenage Borough in 2007, he and his wife were praised for visiting the clubhouse after the game to chat to home supporters. He has three children, including a son, Charlie, who in 2008 joined Gillingham's youth team, but turned down the offer of a professional contract in 2010 after his father's dismissal from the manager's job. In 2000, Stimson presented his Essex Senior Cup winner's medal to a disabled Canvey Island fan, saying "it's easy to forget the fans who come along and support us, often in pouring rain."

In July 2024, Stimson was found guilty of assault following a trial at Stevenage Magistrates' Court. He was ordered to pay a total of £1,052, including £750 towards costs incurred by the Crown Prosecution Service, and £50 compensation to the victim.

== Managerial statistics ==
As of 4 January 2012

Team	From	To	Record					Ref
Team	From	To	G	W	D	L	Win %	Ref
Grays Athletic	17 September 2002	16 May 2006	202	111	60	31	55	
Stevenage Borough	28 May 2006	17 October 2007	72	38	13	21	52.8	
Gillingham	1 November 2007	10 May 2010	144	48	41	55	33.3	
Barnet	1 June 2010	1 January 2011	26	5	5	16	19.2	
Kettering Town	7 September 2011	4 January 2012	22	4	5	13	18.2	
Total			466	206	124	136	44.2	

== Honours ==
=== As a player ===
Canvey Island

- FA Trophy: 2000–01

=== As a manager ===
Grays Athletic

- Conference South: 2004–05
- FA Trophy: 2004–05, 2005–06

Stevenage

- FA Trophy: 2006–07

Gillingham

- Football League Two play-offs: 2009

Thurrock

- Isthmian Division One North play-offs: 2017

Hornchurch

- FA Trophy: 2020–21
