= Leigh Mills =

English footballer

Personal information
- Full name: Leigh Mills
- Date of birth: 8 February 1988 (age 38)
- Place of birth: Winchester, England
- Height: 6 ft 2 in (1.88 m)
- Position: Defender

Team information
- Current team: Halfway House Harriers F.C.

Youth career
- 2004: Swindon Town

Senior career*
Years	Team	Apps	(Gls)
2004–2009	Tottenham Hotspur	0	(0)
2008	→ Brentford (loan)	0	(0)
2008	→ Gillingham (loan)	12	(3)
2010–2012	Winchester City	75	(21)
2012–2013	Eastleigh	9	(8)
2013	Blackfield & Langley	20	(3)
2013–	Winchester City	34	(8)

International career
2003	England U16	1	(0)
2004–2005	England U17	11	(0)
2005	England U18	1	(0)
2006	England U19	1	(0)
- * Club domestic league appearances and goals as of 00:05, 5 May 2013 (UTC)

Leigh Mills (born 8 February 1988) is an English former professional footballer who was signed to Tottenham Hotspur between 2004 and 2009.

Since February 2023, Leigh Mills signed a short-term contract for YMCA Newbury, scoring the opening goal in a 2-1 win against Beacon in the National Christian Cup where Jamie Killner received the MOTM award for a dominant defensive display.

== Career ==
=== Tottenham Hotspur ===
Mills started his career as a youth team player at Swindon Town but was signed by Tottenham Hotspur as a 16-year-old in 2004 before he had made a league appearance for the Robins.

Mills joined Brentford in a season-long loan deal on 17 June 2008. On 8 August he was recalled by Tottenham and joined Gillingham on loan, subsequently extended from one month to five. Mills made his Gillingham and professional debut in a 1–0 home defeat against Luton Town on 16 August. The loan ended on 1 January 2009, and in February, Mills was released from his contract.

=== Others ===
In July 2010, Mills signed for his hometown club Winchester City on a free transfer.

In September 2012 he signed for Conference South side Eastleigh. Mills was released on 18 January 2013, after making nine league appearances for the Spitfires.

In January 2013, Mills signed for Wessex side Blackfield & Langley.

He is now a P.E teacher at Testbourne Community School, Hampshire.
