= Adam Miller (footballer, born 1982) =

Association football midfielder

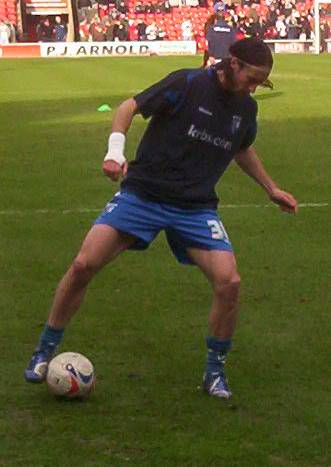
- Miller with Gillingham in 2009

Personal information
- Full name: Adam Edward Miller
- Date of birth: 19 February 1982 (age 44)
- Place of birth: Hemel Hempstead, England
- Height: 1.80 m (5 ft 11 in)
- Position: Midfielder

Senior career*
Years	Team	Apps	(Gls)
1999–2000	Ipswich Town	0	(0)
2000–2002	Canvey Island	59	(9)
2002–2003	Grays Athletic	26	(6)
2003	Gravesend & Northfleet	4	(1)
2003–2004	Aldershot Town	38	(9)
2004–2006	Queens Park Rangers	15	(0)
2005	→ Peterborough United (loan)	2	(0)
2006–2008	Stevenage Borough	59	(11)
2007–2008	→ Gillingham (loan)	7	(2)
2008–2010	Gillingham	82	(11)
2009–2010	→ Dagenham & Redbridge (loan)	8	(0)
2010–2012	Cambridge United	5	(0)
Total		305	(49)

International career
- Northern Ireland U18
2004	England National Game XI	1	(0)
- * Club domestic league appearances and goals

Adam Edward Miller (born 19 February 1982) is a retired footballer. He began his career with Ipswich Town but failed to make the first team and played for several non-league teams before joining Queens Park Rangers, where he made his Football League debut in December 2004. He later joined Stevenage Borough, but followed manager Mark Stimson to Gillingham in late 2007. He represented the England National Game XI and played at Wembley Stadium in the final of the FA Trophy.

== Early life ==
Miller was born in Hemel Hempstead, but grew up in the Monkwick district of Colchester, where his family still lived as of 2004. He attended The Stanway School in the town. At the age of 16 he joined Ipswich Town as a trainee. At around the same time he was called up to represent Northern Ireland at under-18 level, qualifying by virtue of the fact that his maternal grandfather was born in the country.

== Career ==
=== Canvey Island ===
Miller proved unable to break into Ipswich's first team and was permitted to undertake a trial with Southend United in August 2000. He played for the Essex club's reserve team, which led to him being offered a professional contract, but Alan Little was dismissed as the club's manager shortly afterwards, and the offer of a contract was withdrawn. In October 2000, Miller was released from his contract at Ipswich and dropped into non-league football, joining Canvey Island of the Isthmian League. In the 2000–01 season he made 36 appearances for the "Gulls" and helped the team reach the final of the FA Trophy, although he was an unused substitute for Canvey's victory over Forest Green Rovers in the final. The following season, he was a key member of the team that finished second in the Isthmian League Premier Division, playing 48 times in total.

=== Grays Athletic and Aldershot Town ===
In August 2002, after two final games for Canvey, he moved to Grays Athletic in a swap deal which saw Jeff Minton go in the opposite direction. Although he played 26 times for Grays in the 2002–03 season, scoring six goals, he was made available for transfer at the end of the season. He joined Gravesend & Northfleet in September 2003, but played just four games for the club before moving on to Aldershot Town a month later. His form at Aldershot won him The Non-League Paper's Young Player of the Year award for the 2003–04 season, and also led to a call-up to the England National Game XI in February 2004, although it was to be his only cap for the semi-professional national team. In November 2004, Miller played for Aldershot against the reserve team of Queens Park Rangers, the team he had supported since childhood.

=== Queens Park Rangers ===
Rangers manager Ian Holloway, who had received promising reports about Miller from scouts, was sufficiently impressed to sign the player after watching him in person. Although the exact amount was undisclosed, the transfer fee was the highest ever received by Aldershot Town. Miller made his Football League debut on 4 December 2004 in a 2–1 defeat to Nottingham Forest, and played in more than half of the team's remaining league matches that season. By late September 2005, he had made just one league appearances since the start of the season, and was sent to Peterborough United on what was originally intended to be a three-month loan. A month later he was recalled to Loftus Road, but he was not to feature again in the Rangers team.

=== Stevenage ===
In January 2006, he had a brief trial with Oxford United but the following week he joined Stevenage Borough of the Conference National, initially on an 18-month contract.

Miller featured regularly for Stevenage, and was in the starting line-up for the 2007 FA Trophy final, the first competitive match at the new Wembley Stadium, in which Borough came back from two goals down to beat Kidderminster Harriers and win the Trophy.

=== Gillingham ===
Stevenage manager, Mark Stimson, was appointed as the new manager of Gillingham in November 2007, and quickly moved to sign Miller and his teammate John Nutter on loan. Miller made his debut for the Kent club in the 2–1 home win over Hartlepool United on 24 November 2007, and signed a permanent contract in January 2008, set to keep him at the club until 2010. During the team's ultimately unsuccessful struggle to avoid relegation from League One in the 2007–08 season, Miller was identified as a key player and singled out for praise by Stimson, who said "If eight players play like Adam Miller we won't be in this position but if we've only got one or two we will be".

The following season, he remained a regular selection in Stimson's team, acting as captain in Barry Fuller's absence, but injury kept him out of the team at the end of the season as Gillingham clinched a place in, and ultimately promotion through, the play-offs.

In the 2009–10 season, however, he failed to hold down a regular place in the team, and in November 2009 went to Dagenham & Redbridge on a one-month loan. Miller's debut for Dagenham came on 14 November in a 1–0 away win against Accrington Stanley. He returned to Gillingham at the end of his loan spell, but Stimson announced that the club was considering paying off the remainder of the player's contract. Despite this, Miller played regularly during the remainder of the 2009–10 season.

=== Cambridge United and retirement ===
At the end of the season he left Gillingham and joined Cambridge United. Miller played several times at the start of the 2010–11 campaign, but was seriously injured in early September against Eastbourne Borough. Two years later, he announced his retirement from football as a result of the injury. He subsequently set up a company leasing luxury cars to other footballers.

== Honours ==
Canvey Island

- FA Trophy: 2000–01

Stevenage Borough

- FA Trophy: 2006–07

Gillingham

- Football League Two play-offs: 2009
