= 2004–05 FA Trophy =

FA Challenge Trophy

Tournament details
- Country: England; Wales
- Teams: 220

Final positions
- Champions: Grays Athletic
- Runners-up: Hucknall Town

The 2004–05 FA Trophy was the thirty-fifth season of the FA Trophy, the Football Association's cup competition for teams at levels 5–8 of the English football league system.

== Preliminary round ==
=== Ties ===
Tie	Home team	Score	Away team	Attendance
1	AFC Wimbledon	2–0	Metropolitan Police	1,785
2	Arlesey Town	2–1	Croydon Athletic	86
3	Ashford Town (Middlesex)	2–1	Evesham United	87
4	Barking & East Ham United	2–1	Fisher Athletic	
5	Barton Rovers	2–3	Wivenhoe Town	74
6	Bashley	2–1	Ashford Town (Kent)	80
7	Beaconsfield SYCOB	0–1	Boreham Wood	48
8	Belper Town	3–0	Rossendale United	96
9	Berkhamsted Town	1–4	Waltham Forest	101
10	Bromley	2–1	Chatham Town	261
11	Bromsgrove Rovers	1–0	Burnham	281
12	Burgess Hill Town	2–1	Wingate & Finchley	130
13	Clitheroe	1–4	Kendal Town	159
14	Corby Town	1–2	Brackley Town	115
15	Corinthian-Casuals	2–2	Banstead Athletic	74
16	Cray Wanderers	3–1	Aveley	170
17	Dartford	5–2	Leatherhead	201
18	Erith & Belvedere	0–2	Harlow Town	78
19	Fleet Town	1–1	Tilbury	70
20	Great Wakering Rovers	1–0	Maldon Town	103
21	Gresley Rovers	4–3	Spalding United	177
22	Hastings United	0–3	East Thurrock United	192
23	Horsham	3–2	Uxbridge	227
24	Kidsgrove Athletic	4–2	AFC Telford United	330
25	Newport (IOW)	0–2	Tooting & Mitcham United	133
26	North Ferriby United	3–1	Brigg Town	485
27	Sittingbourne	2–1	Leighton Town	118
28	Stocksbridge Park Steels	3–2	Chorley	106
29	Taunton Town	2–1	Marlow	171
30	Thame United	4–2	Egham Town	78
31	Warrington Town	2–3	Ossett Albion	109
32	Woodley Sports	2–0	Ilkeston Town	101
33	Yate Town	2–0	Swindon Supermarine	205

† – After extra time

=== Replays ===
Tie	Home team	Score	Away team	Attendance
15'	Banstead Athletic	5–4 †	Corinthian-Casuals	87
19'	Tilbury	2–1 †	Fleet Town	82

† – After extra time

== First round ==
Teams from Conference North and Conference South entered in this round

=== Ties ===
Tie	Home team	Score	Away team	Attendance
1	Alfreton Town	2–0	Runcorn F.C. Halton	386
2	Altrincham	6–1	Ossett Albion	456
3	Arlesey Town	0–1	Hornchurch	204
4	Aylesbury United	2–1	Solihull Borough	218
5	Bamber Bridge	0–0	Spennymoor United	143
6	Banbury United	1–1	Yate Town	365
7	Banstead Athletic	2–3	Wealdstone	132
8	Bedford Town	2–3	Stamford	412
9	Bishop Auckland	2–3	Kidsgrove Athletic	108
10	Bognor Regis Town	0–1	Billericay Town	407
11	Bradford Park Avenue	1–1	North Ferriby United	215
12	Bromsgrove Rovers	2–1	Halesowen Town	522
13	Burgess Hill Town	1–0	Sittingbourne	181
14	Burscough	2–1	Guiseley	221
15	Carshalton Athletic	4–1	Heybridge Swifts	248
16	Chesham United	1–2	Bedworth United	193
17	Cheshunt	2–1	Braintree Town	131
18	Cinderford Town	1–1	Cambridge City	148
19	Cirencester Town	3–2	Thame United	161
20	Colwyn Bay	0–1	Kendal Town	167
21	Cray Wanderers	2–2	Folkestone Invicta	186
22	Droylsden	1–0	Leek Town	262
23	Dulwich Hamlet	1–1	Havant & Waterlooville	237
24	Dunstable Town	2–6	Histon	102
25	Eastbourne Borough	3–1	Harrow Borough	424
26	Eastleigh	1–2	St Albans City	303
27	Eastwood Town	1–0	Worksop Town	216
28	Gainsborough Trinity	2–1	Workington	351
29	Gateshead	1–1	Southport	227
30	Gloucester City	0–2	King's Lynn	383
31	Grays Athletic	5–1	Great Wakering Rovers	274
32	Gresley Rovers	2–1	Frickley Athletic	249
33	Hampton & Richmond Borough	1–1	Sutton United	303
34	Hayes	1–0	Bashley	215
35	Hemel Hempstead Town	1–3	Taunton Town	183
36	Hendon	3–0	AFC Wimbledon	1,184
37	Hinckley United	3–1	Stafford Rangers	437
38	Hucknall Town	4–0	Bracknell Town	273
39	Hyde United	4–1	Belper Town	275
40	Kingstonian	2–3	Bishop's Stortford	343
41	Leyton	2–1	Barking & East Ham United	106
42	Maidenhead United	3–4	Bromley	165
43	Mangotsfield United	1–0	Ashford Town (Middlesex)	234
44	Marine	1–1	Whitby Town	202
45	Matlock Town	2–2	Lancaster City	278
46	Molesey	1–2	Welling United	125
47	Moor Green	1–1	Weymouth	297
48	Mossley	2–2	Bridlington Town	240
49	Newport County	0–4	Kettering Town	528
50	Northwood	1–4	Boreham Wood	196
51	Oxford City	4–1	Brackley Town	189
52	Paulton Rovers	2–3	Dorchester Town	261
53	Prescot Cables	1–1	Lincoln United	143
54	Radcliffe Borough	4–1	Stocksbridge Park Steels	196
55	Redbridge	5–1	Dartford	97
56	Redditch United	2–1	Merthyr Tydfil	312
57	Rocester	2–1	Ossett Albion	93
58	Rothwell Town	2–1	Nuneaton Borough	358
59	Rugby United	2–2	Clevedon Town	254
60	Salisbury City	0–4	Thurrock	471
61	Shepshed Dynamo	0–1	Willenhall Town	122
62	Slough Town	7–0	Dorking	345
63	Staines Town	2–0	Dover Athletic	315
64	Stalybridge Celtic	3–2	Harrogate Town	363
65	Stourport Swifts	0–1	Sutton Coldfield Town	97
66	Team Bath	3–0	Hitchin Town	135
67	Tilbury	1–4	Lewes	71
68	Tiverton Town	0–2	Bath City	599
69	Tonbridge Angels	3–1	Horsham	409
70	Tooting & Mitcham United	4–1	Harlow Town	221
71	Vauxhall Motors	2–1	Ashton United	145
72	Wakefield-Emley	2–1	Farsley Celtic	224
73	Waltham Forest	1–1	East Thurrock United	61
74	Walton & Hersham	3–2	Margate	194
75	Weston-super-Mare	0–0	Grantham Town	278
76	Windsor & Eton	4–0	Basingstoke Town	207
77	Witton Albion	2–3	Blyth Spartans	250
78	Wivenhoe Town	0–3	Chelmsford City	422
79	Woodley Sports	0–1	Barrow	151
80	Worcester City	3–0	Chippenham Town	627
81	Worthing	1–0	Whyteleafe	331
82	Yeading	6–1	Croydon	76

=== Replays ===
Tie	Home team	Score	Away team	Attendance
5	Spennymoor United	4–1	Bamber Bridge	124
6	Yate Town	3–1	Banbury United	193
11	North Ferriby United	2–2 †	Bradford Park Avenue	174
	North Ferriby United advance 3–1 on penalties			
18	Cambridge City	3–1	Cinderford Town	185
21	Folkestone Invicta	1–3	Cray Wanderers	243
23	Havant & Waterlooville	3–0	Dulwich Hamlet	204
29	Southport	2–1	Gateshead	461
33	Sutton United	4–1	Hampton & Richmond Borough	241
44	Whitby Town	2–1	Marine	172
45	Lancaster City	4–3 †	Matlock Town	202
47	Weymouth	2–1	Moor Green	639
48	Bridlington Town	4–1	Mossley	170
53	Lincoln United	1–3	Prescot Cables	112
59	Clevedon Town	0–1	Rugby United	
73'	East Thurrock United	1–0	Waltham Forest	64
75	Grantham Town	1–0	Weston-super-Mare	319

† – After extra time

== Second round ==
=== Ties ===
Tie	Home team	Score	Away team	Attendance
1	Barrow	3–1	Rothwell Town	574
2	Bath City	4–2	Carshalton Athletic	601
3	Blyth Spartans	0–3	Sutton Coldfield Town	421
4	Boreham Wood	0–1	Leyton	121
5	Bridlington Town	0–0	Eastwood Town	194
6	Cambridge City	1–1	Hornchurch	390
7	Chelmsford City	0–1	Slough Town	424
8	Cheshunt	2–1	Bromley	126
9	Cray Wanderers	2–2	St Albans City	156
10	Droylsden	2–4	Spennymoor United	202
11	East Thurrock United	0–2	Histon	150
12	Eastbourne Borough	2–1	Dorchester Town	456
13	Gainsborough Trinity	1–1	Altrincham	455
14	Grays Athletic	4–1	Windsor & Eton	398
15	Gresley Rovers	2–0	Bedworth United	258
16	Havant & Waterlooville	2–1	Grantham Town	210
17	Hinckley United	1–2	Willenhall Town	337
18	Hucknall Town	2–1	Radcliffe Borough	274
19	Kendal Town	1–1	Hyde United	174
20	Kettering Town	1–0	Burscough	723
21	Kidsgrove Athletic	1–2	Vauxhall Motors	235
22	King's Lynn	1–3	Southport	964
23	Lancaster City	1–0	Bromsgrove Rovers	305
24	Lewes	1–4	Bishop's Stortford	416
25	North Ferriby United	1–2	Alfreton Town	198
26	Redbridge	1–0	Weymouth	
27	Rugby United	0–1	Yate Town	229
28	Staines Town	2–3	Aylesbury United	336
29	Stalybridge Celtic	0–1	Whitby Town	410
30	Stamford	3–1	Rocester	177
31	Taunton Town	0–3	Hendon	361
32	Team Bath	4–2	Wealdstone	203
33	Thurrock	6–1	Burgess Hill Town	116
34	Tonbridge Angels	1–1	Oxford City	379
35	Tooting & Mitcham United	2–2	Hayes	337
36	Wakefield-Emley	0–1	Redditch United	199
37	Walton & Hersham	3–2	Cirencester Town	206
38	Welling United	0–1	Sutton United	501
39	Worcester City	2–1	Prescot Cables	661
40	Worthing	1–0	Mangotsfield United	422
41	Yeading	0–4	Billericay Town	185

=== Replays ===
Tie	Home team	Score	Away team	Attendance
5	Eastwood Town	4–0	Bridlington Town	202
6	Hornchurch	0–4	Cambridge City	290
9	St Albans City	3–2 †	Cray Wanderers	168
13	Altrincham	1–0 †	Gainsborough Trinity	381
19	Hyde United	3–2	Kendal Town	235
34	Oxford City	2–4	Tonbridge Angels	143
35	Hayes	2–1	Tooting & Mitcham United	175

† – After extra time

== Third round ==
Hednesford Town as title holders and teams from Conference National entered in this round.

=== Ties ===
Tie	Home team	Score	Away team	Attendance
1	Accrington Stanley	0–0	Hereford United	945
2	Barnet	1–0	Farnborough Town	1,334
3	Barrow	2–1	Scarborough	1,076
4	Bath City	0–3	Canvey Island	693
5	Billericay Town	2–2	Exeter City	1,380
6	Burton Albion	3–0	York City	1,286
7	Carlisle United	3–1	Redditch United	912
8	Crawley Town	3–2	Worthing	1,343
9	Dagenham & Redbridge	1–2	Bishop's Stortford	931
10	Eastwood Town	3–2	Spennymoor United	263
11	Forest Green Rovers	1–2	Aylesbury United	554
12	Gravesend & Northfleet	0–0	Eastbourne Borough	862
13	Halifax Town	0–1	Northwich Victoria	1,345
14	Hednesford Town	1–0	Worcester City	748
15	Hyde United	3–3	Whitby Town	402
16	Kettering Town	0–0	Alfreton Town	1,113
17	Leigh RMI	1–2	Altrincham	401
18	Leyton	0–0	Cheshunt	84
19	Morecambe	2–1	Sutton Coldfield Town	887
20	Redbridge	1–5	Cambridge City	
21	Slough Town	4–3	Hendon	405
22	Southport	2–2	Hucknall Town	770
23	St Albans City	0–1	Havant & Waterlooville	373
24	Stamford	3–1	Willenhall Town	280
25	Sutton United	0–2	Grays Athletic	544
26	Tamworth	5–0	Gresley Rovers	910
27	Team Bath	1–2	Histon	131
28	Thurrock	1–0	Aldershot Town	613
29	Tonbridge Angels	1–1	Walton & Hersham	543
30	Vauxhall Motors	1–1	Lancaster City	235
31	Woking	1–0	Stevenage Borough	2,139
32	Yate Town	1–1	Hayes	310

=== Replays ===
Tie	Home team	Score	Away team	Attendance
1	Hereford United	4–0	Accrington Stanley	740
5	Exeter City	2–0	Billericay Town	2,766
12	Eastbourne Borough	0–1	Gravesend & Northfleet	557
15	Whitby Town	0–1	Hyde United	249
16	Alfreton Town	2–1	Kettering Town	
18	Cheshunt	0–3	Leyton	104
22	Hucknall Town	1–0	Southport	336
29	Walton & Hersham	1–1 †	Tonbridge Angels	235
	Walton & Hersham advance 3–2 on penalties			
30	Lancaster City	3–0	Vauxhall Motors	225
32	Hayes	7–2	Yate Town	186

† – After extra time

== Fourth round ==
=== Ties ===
Tie	Home team	Score	Away team	Attendance
1	Alfreton Town	0–3	Woking	585
2	Altrincham	1–0	Barrow	1,119
3	Aylesbury United	0–1	Canvey Island	675
4	Bishop's Stortford	3–0	Leyton	459
5	Burton Albion	2–0	Hednesford Town	1,634
6	Cambridge City	3–3	Crawley Town	698
7	Carlisle United	4–1	Barnet	1,575
8	Eastwood Town	1–0	Hayes	324
9	Gravesend & Northfleet	2–1	Histon	669
10	Grays Athletic	5–0	Havant & Waterlooville	570
11	Hereford United	3–0	Hyde United	1,575
12	Lancaster City	1–2	Morecambe	1,596
13	Northwich Victoria	0–1	Hucknall Town	814
14	Slough Town	1–0	Thurrock	503
15	Stamford	0–0	Walton & Hersham	388
16	Tamworth	0–3	Exeter City	1,219

=== Replays ===
Tie	Home team	Score	Away team	Attendance
6	Crawley Town	1–2	Cambridge City	936
15	Walton & Hersham	3–3	Stamford	365
	Stamford advance 2–0 on penalties			

== Fifth round ==
=== Ties ===
Tie	Home team	Score	Away team	Attendance
1	Altrincham	2–4	Grays Athletic	1,046
2	Burton Albion	1–0	Morecambe	1,488
3	Cambridge City	0–1	Hucknall Town	684
4	Canvey Island	2–2	Bishop's Stortford	683
5	Eastwood Town	1–1	Hereford United	985
6	Gravesend & Northfleet	3–2	Slough Town	963
7	Stamford	0–1	Exeter City	1,058
8	Woking	1–0	Carlisle United	2,285

=== Replays ===
Tie	Home team	Score	Away team	Attendance
4	Bishop's Stortford	2–1	Canvey Island	509
5	Hereford United	4–2	Eastwood Town	1,090

== Sixth round ==
=== Ties ===
Tie	Home team	Score	Away team	Attendance
1	Bishop's Stortford	1–1	Gravesend & Northfleet	1,163
2	Burton Albion	1–0	Woking	1,673
3	Grays Athletic	4–1	Exeter City	1,822
4	Hereford United	2–2	Hucknall Town	1,766

=== Replays ===
Tie	Home team	Score	Away team	Attendance
1	Gravesend & Northfleet	2–3 †	Bishop's Stortford	1,086
4	Hucknall Town	1–0	Hereford United	1,521

† After Extra Time

== Semi-finals ==
=== First leg ===
2 April 2005
15:00 (GMT)

Grays Athletic	5–0	Burton Albion
Cole 12'; Oli 17', 61'; Thurgood 37' (pen.); Matthews 69'

New Recreation Ground, Grays
Attendance: 2,156
Referee: Mick Russell

2 April 2005
15:00 (GMT)

Bishop's Stortford	1–2	Hucknall Town
Langer 14'		Todd 3'; Ricketts 36'

Woodside Park, Bishop's Stortford
Attendance: 1,708
Referee: Keith Stroud

=== Second leg ===
9 April 2005
15:00 (GMT)

Burton Albion	0–2	Grays Athletic
		Oli 2'; Griffiths 72'

Eton Park, Burton upon Trent
Attendance: 1,162
Referee: Mick Russell

Grays Athletic win 7–0 on aggregate

9 April 2005
15:00 (GMT)

Hucknall Town	3–2	Bishop's Stortford
Bacon 14'; Hunter 32' (pen.); Timons 85'		Jackman 35', 62'

Watnall Road, Hucknall
Attendance: 1,871
Referee: Kevin Friend

Hucknall Town win 5–3 on aggregate

== Final ==
22 May 2005
12:00 (GMT)

Grays Athletic	1–1	Hucknall Town
Martin 64'		Bacon 77'
Penalties
Thurgood (penalty scored); Martin (penalty scored); Powell (penalty missed) Nutter (penalty scored); Brennan (penalty scored); Carthy (penalty scored)	6–5	Hunter (penalty missed); Heathcoate (penalty scored); Todd (penalty scored) Bacon (penalty scored); Ricketts (penalty scored); Cooke (penalty missed)

Villa Park, Birmingham
Attendance: 8,116
Referee: Phil Dowd
