= 2009 Football League play-offs =

Football League play-offs
- Season: 2008–09
- Champions: Burnley (Championship); Scunthorpe United (League One); Gillingham (League Two)
- Matches: 15
- Goals: 23 (1.53 per match)
- Biggest home win: Gillingham 2–1 Rochdale (League Two)
- Biggest away win: Reading 0–2 Burnley (Championship)
- Highest scoring: Millwall 2-3 Scunthorpe (5 goals)
- Highest attendance: 80,518 – Burnley v Sheffield United (Championship final)
- Lowest attendance: 4,450 – Rochdale v Gillingham (League Two semi-final)
- Average attendance: 25,298

The Football League play-offs for the 2008–09 season were held in May 2009, with the finals taking place at Wembley Stadium in London. The play-off semi-finals were played over two legs and were contested by the teams who finished in 3rd, 4th, 5th and 6th place in the Football League Championship and League One tables, and the 4th, 5th, 6th and 7th placed teams in League Two. The semi-final winners progressed to the finals, with the winner of each match earning promotion for the following season.

Burnley and Sheffield United contested the Championship play-off final, having defeated Reading and Preston North End respectively in the semi-finals. Burnley secured promotion to the Premier League with a 1–0 victory, courtesy of a goal from Wade Elliott. In the League One final, Scunthorpe United won 3–2 against Millwall; Leeds United and MK Dons were the other teams to reach the play-offs. In League Two, Gillingham won their semi-final against Rochdale and then secured promotion with a 1–0 victory against Shrewsbury, who had beaten Bury in their semi-final.

== Background ==
The Football League play-offs have been held every year since 1987. They take place for each division following the conclusion of the regular season and are contested by the four clubs finishing below the automatic promotion places.

In the Championship, Sheffield United, who had been relegated from the Premier League under controversial circumstances in 2007, finished 3 points behind second placed Birmingham City, who in turn had finished 7 points off the champions Wolverhampton Wanderers. Reading - who were aiming to return to the Premier League at the first attempt - were in fourth place in the table. Burnley and Preston North End were only a couple of points further back on 76 and 74 respectively. Neither of the latter had played in the Premier League before, with Preston's last spell in the top division ending in 1961. Burnley were relegated from in the top flight in 1976.

== Championship ==
Pos	Team	Pld	W	D	L	GF	GA	GD	Pts
3	Sheffield United	46	22	14	10	64	39	+25	80
4	Reading	46	21	14	11	72	40	+32	77
5	Burnley	46	21	13	12	72	60	+12	76
6	Preston North End	46	21	11	14	66	54	+12	74

=== Semi-finals ===
First leg

8 May 2009
19:45

Preston North End	1–1	Sheffield United
St Ledger 21'	Report	Howard 46'

Deepdale, Preston
Attendance: 19,840
Referee: Andre Marriner

9 May 2009
17:20

Burnley	1–0	Reading
Alexander 84' (pen.)	Report

Turf Moor, Burnley
Attendance: 18,005
Referee: Martin Atkinson

Second leg

11 May 2009
19:45

Sheffield United	1–0	Preston North End
Halford 59'	Report

Bramall Lane, Sheffield
Attendance: 26,354
Referee: Alan Wiley

Sheffield United won 2–1 on aggregate.

12 May 2009
19:45

Reading	0–2	Burnley
	Report	Paterson 51'; Thompson 58'

Madejski Stadium, Reading
Attendance: 19,909
Referee: Mike Riley

Burnley won 3–0 on aggregate.

=== Final ===
25 May 2009
15:00

Burnley	1–0	Sheffield United
Elliott 13'	Report

Wembley Stadium, London
Attendance: 80,518
Referee: Mike Dean

== League One ==
Pos	Team	Pld	W	D	L	GF	GA	GD	Pts
3	Milton Keynes Dons	46	26	9	11	83	47	+36	87
4	Leeds United	46	26	6	14	77	49	+28	84
5	Millwall	46	25	7	14	63	53	+10	82
6	Scunthorpe United	46	22	10	14	82	63	+19	76

=== Semi-finals ===
First leg

8 May 2009
19:45

Scunthorpe United	1–1	Milton Keynes Dons
Woolford 13'	Report	Wilbraham 27'

Glanford Park, Scunthorpe
Attendance: 6,599
Referee: Scott Mathieson

9 May 2009
12:45

Millwall	1–0	Leeds United
Harris 71'	Report

The New Den, Bermondsey
Attendance: 13,228
Referee: Clive Oliver

Second leg

14 May 2009
19:45

Leeds United	1–1	Millwall
Becchio 53'	Report	Abdou 74'

Elland Road, Leeds
Attendance: 37,036
Referee: Mark Halsey

Millwall won 2–1 on aggregate.

15 May 2009
19:45

Milton Keynes Dons	0–0 (a.e.t.)	Scunthorpe United
	Report
Penalties
Leven (penalty scored); Wilbraham (penalty scored); Navarro (penalty scored); Puncheon (penalty missed); Llera (penalty scored); Stirling (penalty missed); Lewington (penalty scored); Guéret (penalty scored); Flo (penalty missed)	6–7	(penalty scored) McCann; (penalty scored) Hayes; (penalty scored) Crosby; (penalty missed) Byrne; (penalty scored) Trotter; (penalty missed) Sparrow; (penalty scored) Forte; (penalty scored) Togwell; (penalty scored) Morris

Stadium:mk, Milton Keynes
Attendance: 14,479
Referee: Neil Swarbrick

Milton Keynes Dons 1–1 Scunthorpe United on aggregate. Scunthorpe United won 7–6 on penalties.

=== Final ===
24 May 2009
13:00

Millwall	2–3	Scunthorpe United
Alexander 37', 39'	Report	Sparrow 6', 70'; Woolford 85'

Wembley Stadium, London
Attendance: 59,661
Referee: Michael Oliver

== League Two ==
Pos	Team	Pld	W	D	L	GF	GA	GD	Pts
4	Bury	46	21	15	10	63	43	+20	78
5	Gillingham	46	21	12	13	58	55	+3	75
6	Rochdale	46	19	13	14	70	59	+11	70
7	Shrewsbury Town	46	17	18	11	61	44	+17	69

=== Semi-finals ===
First leg

7 May 2009
19:45

Shrewsbury Town	0–1	Bury
	Report	Ashton 81' (o.g.)

Prostar Stadium, Shrewsbury
Attendance: 8,429
Referee: Graham Laws

7 May 2009
19:45

Rochdale	0–0	Gillingham
	Report

Spotland, Rochdale
Attendance: 4,450
Referee: Kevin Friend

Second leg

10 May 2009
12:00

Bury	0–1 (a.e.t.)	Shrewsbury Town
	Report	McIntyre 88'
Penalties
Barry-Murphy (penalty scored); Jones (penalty scored); Racchi (penalty missed); Bennett (penalty scored); Bishop (penalty missed)	3–4	(penalty scored) Davies; (penalty scored) Ashikodi; (penalty scored) McIntyre; (penalty scored) Worrall

Gigg Lane, Bury
Attendance: 7,673
Referee: Colin Webster

Bury 1–1 Shrewsbury Town on aggregate. Shrewsbury Town won 4–3 on penalties.

10 May 2009
18:30

Gillingham	2–1	Rochdale
Jackson 13', 58' (pen.)	Report	Dagnall 36'

KRBS Priestfield Stadium, Gillingham
Attendance: 9,585
Referee: Michael Oliver

Gillingham won 2–1 on aggregate.

=== Final ===
23 May 2009
15:00

Gillingham	1–0	Shrewsbury Town
Jackson 90'	Report

Wembley Stadium, London
Attendance: 53,706
Referee: Clive Oliver
