= 2012–13 Gillingham F.C. season =

English football club season

Gillingham F.C.
2012–13 season
- Chairman: Paul Scally
- Manager: Martin Allen
- Football League Two: 1st (promoted)
- FA Cup: Second round
- Football League Cup: Second round
- Football League Trophy: First round
- Top goalscorer: League: Danny Kedwell (14); All: Danny Kedwell (17)
- Highest home attendance: 11,172 (vs. AFC Wimbledon, 20 April)
- Lowest home attendance: 4,017 (vs. Scunthorpe United, 3 November)
Home colours	Away colours

This page shows the progress of Gillingham in the 2012–13 season. This season they will play their league games in Football League Two, the fourth tier of English football.

This was the season Gillingham won their first League Championship in nearly 50 years, finishing 1st in League Two after a 2–2 draw with AFC Wimbledon in the penultimate match of the season.

== Results ==
=== Pre-season ===
21 July 2012	Dartford	0–1	Gillingham	Princes Park
15:00		Report	Strevens 73'	Attendance: 1,049

7 July 2012	Gillingham	0–3	Watford	Priestfield Stadium
19:30		Report	Vydra 12', 15'; Mingoia 29'

=== League Two ===
18 August 2012	Gillingham	3–1	Bradford City	Priestfield Stadium
15:00	Kedwell 43', 54' (pen.); Weston 88'	Report	62' (pen.) Wells	Attendance: 5,127; Referee: Mike Russell

21 August 2012	Wycombe Wanderers	0–1	Gillingham	Adams Park
19:45		Report	56' Martin; (yellow card) 25' (yellow-red card) 78' Flanagan	Attendance: 3,507; Referee: Steve Martin

25 August 2012	Dagenham & Redbridge	1–2	Gillingham	Victoria Road
15:00	Gayle 34' (pen.)	Report	30' Burton; 62' Weston	Attendance: 2,251; Referee: Robert Lewis

1 September 2012	Gillingham	1–1	Chesterfield	Priestfield Stadium
15:00	Kedwell 21'	Report	13' Westcarr	Attendance: 4,380; Referee: Pat Miller

8 September 2012	Barnet	1–3	Gillingham	Underhill Stadium
15:00	Saville 23'	Report	10' Payne; 11' Kedwell; 39' Burton	Attendance: 2,835; Referee: Graham Scott

15 September 2012	Gillingham	4–0	Bristol Rovers	Priestfield Stadium
15:00	Kedwell 5' (pen.), 15'; Lee 45'; Whelpdale 82'	Report		Attendance: 4,768; Referee: Sutton

18 September 2012	Gillingham	1–0	Southend United	Priestfield Stadium
19:45	Kedwell 45+3'; Dack (red card) 45+9'	Report		Attendance: 4,920; Referee: Phil Gibbs

22 September 2012	Port Vale	0–2	Gillingham	Vale Park
15:00		Report	11' Burton; 25' Whelpdale	Attendance: 6,978; Referee: Bond

29 September 2012	Gillingham	1–2	Rochdale	Priestfield Stadium
15:00	Jackman (red card) 33'; Kedwell 74' (pen.)	Report	15' Tutte; 59' Grant	Attendance: 5,874; Referee: Phillips

2 October 2012	Northampton Town	1–2	Gillingham	Sixfields Stadium
19:45	Akinfenwa 82'	Report	44' Burton; 55' Payne; (yellow card) 90+4' (yellow-red card) Allen	Attendance: 3,648; Referee: Hooper

6 October 2012	Oxford United	0–0	Gillingham	Kassam Stadium
15:00		Report		Attendance: 6,690; Referee: Williamson

13 October 2012	Gillingham	4–0	Aldershot Town	Priestfield Stadium
15:00	Allen 11'; Kedwell 27' (pen.); Weston 38'; Whelpdale 66'	Report		Attendance: 5,039; Referee: Haywood

20 October 2012	Gillingham	4–1	Burton Albion	Priestfield Stadium
15:00	Flanagan 22'; Fish 40'; Weston 59'; Martin 63'	Report	54' Diamond	Attendance: 7,268; Referee: Collins

23 October 2012	Torquay United	2–1	Gillingham	Plainmoor
19:45	Craig 56'; Nicholson 84'	Report	53' Burton	Attendance: 2,251; Referee: Malone

27 October 2012	AFC Wimbledon	0–1	Gillingham	Kingsmeadow
15:00		Report	23' Vincelot	Attendance: 4,546; Referee: Sarginson

6 November 2012	Gillingham	0–0	Cheltenham Town	Priestfield Stadium
19:45		Report		Attendance: 6,096

10 November 2012	Plymouth Argyle	2–2	Gillingham	Home Park
15:00	Nelson 33'; Young 79'	Report	38' Strevens; 88' Barrett	Attendance: 6,396

17 November 2012	Gillingham	2–1	Morecambe	Priestfield Stadium
15:00	Montrose 37'; Burton 90'	Report	69' Redshaw	Attendance: 5,402

20 November 2012	Gillingham	2–3	Exeter City	Priestfield Stadium
19:45	Whelpdale 4'; Jackman 79'	Report	27' Gow; 54', 87' Cureton	Attendance: 6,851

24 November 2012	Accrington Stanley	1–1	Gillingham	Crown Ground
15:00	Beattie 72' (pen.)	Report	42' Weston; (red card) 72' Nelson	Attendance: 1,624

8 December 2012	Rotherham United	1–2	Gillingham	New York Stadium
15:00	Taylor 69'	Report	11', 57' Burton	Attendance: 8,029

15 December 2012	Gillingham	2–2	Fleetwood Town	Priestfield Stadium
15:00	Lee 42'; Weston 65'	Report	20' Brown; 28' Goodall	Attendance: 8,571

26 December 2012	Gillingham	0–1	Barnet	Priestfield Stadium
15:00		Report	19' Hyde	Attendance: 7,448

1 January 2013	Southend United	0–1	Gillingham	Roots Hall
13:00		Report	3' Whelpdale	Attendance: 7,498

5 January 2013	Bristol Rovers	0–2	Gillingham	Memorial Stadium
15:00		Report	3' Whelpdale; 44' Burton	Attendance: 6,088

12 January 2013	Gillingham	1–2	Port Vale	Priestfield Stadium
15:00	Kedwell 21'	Report	4' Pope; 20' Hughes	Attendance: 8,392

26 January 2013	Gillingham	1–1	York City	Priestfield Stadium
15:00	McDonald 85'	Report	17' (o.g.) Lee	Attendance: 4,893

29 January 2013	Gillingham	2–0	Northampton Town	Priestfield Stadium
19:45	McDonald 4'; Weston 84'	Report		Attendance: 5,600

4 February 2013	Gillingham	0–1	Wycombe Wanderers	Priestfield Stadium
19:45		Report	85' McClure	Attendance: 4,758

9 February 2013	Bradford City	0–1	Gillingham	Valley Parade
15:00		Report	64' McDonald	Attendance: 10,887

12 February 2013	York City	0–0	Gillingham	Bootham Crescent
19:45		Report		Attendance: 2,699

16 February 2013	Gillingham	2–1	Dagenham & Redbridge	Priestfield Stadium
15:00	Legge 29'; Burton 68' (pen.)	Report	52' Ilesanmi

23 February 2013	Chesterfield	0–1	Gillingham	Proact Stadium
15:00		Report	50' McDonald	Attendance: 5,235

26 February 2013	Gillingham	0–1	Oxford United	Priestfield Stadium
19:45		Report	84' Potter	Attendance: 4,928

2 March 2013	Aldershot Town	1–1	Gillingham	Recreation Ground
15:00	Reid 47'	Report	75' Legge	Attendance: 3,267

9 March 2013	Gillingham	2–1	Plymouth Argyle	Priestfield Stadium
15:00	German 31'; Whelpdale 62'	Report	77' Banton	Attendance: 10,260

12 March 2013	Exeter City	0–0	Gillingham	St James Park
19:45		Report		Attendance: 3,608

16 March 2013	Morcambe	1–1	Gillingham	Globe Arena
15:00	Redshaw 42'	Report	52' Dack	Attendance: 1,674

19 March 2013	Rochdale	1–1	Gillingham	Spotland Stadium
19:45	Donnelly 12'	Report	56' Kedwell; (red card) 88' Frampton	Attendance: 1,551

23 March 2013	Gillingham	1–0	Accrington Stanley	Priestfield Stadium
15:00	Fish 24'	Report		Attendance: 10,097

30 March 2013	Fleetwood Town	2–2	Gillingham	Highbury Stadium
15:00	Matt 33', 69'	Report	3' Kedwell; 43' Allen	Attendance: 3,033

1 April 2013	Gillingham	1–0	Rotherham United	Priestfield Stadium
15:00	Burton 22'	Report		Attendance: 6,796

6 April 2013	Gillingham	1–0	Torquay United	Priestfield Stadium
15:00	Kedwell 48'	Report		Attendance: 7,574

13 April 2013	Cheltenham Town	1–0	Gillingham	Whaddon Road
15:00	Hector 67'			Attendance: 4,939

20 April 2013	Gillingham	2–2	AFC Wimbledon	Priestfield Stadium
15:00	Burton 12'; Kedwell 23'		Midson 65'; Meades 82'	Attendance: 11,172

27 April 2013	Burton Albion	3–2	Gillingham	Pirelli Stadium
15:00	Kee 33'; Symes 39'; Zola 63'		Weston 9'; Nyafli 66'	Attendance: 5,426

=== FA Cup ===
3 November 2012	Gillingham	4–0	Scunthorpe United	Priestfield Stadium
15:00	Fish 59'; Burton 65'; Kedwell 76' (pen.); Birchall 90'			Attendance: 4,017

1 December 2012	Preston North End	2–0	Gillingham	Deepdale
15:00	Monakana 12'; Beavon			Attendance: 5,271

=== League Cup ===
14 August 2012	Bristol City	1–2	Gillingham	Ashton Gate Stadium
15:00	Elliott 90'		45' (pen.) Kedwell; 54' Strevens	Attendance: 4,339

28 August 2012	Gillingham	0–2	Middlesbrough	Priestfield Stadium
19:45			23' Carayol; 90' Park	Attendance: 5,146

=== League Trophy ===
4 September 2012	Crawley Town	3–2	Gillingham	Broadfield Stadium
19:45	Walsh 40'; Clarke 47'; Neilson 86'		22' Dack; 49' Montrose	Attendance: 1,249

== League Two ==
=== League table ===
Pos	Team	Pld	W	D	L	GF	GA	GD	Pts	Promotion, qualification or relegation
1	Gillingham (C, P)	46	23	14	9	66	39	+27	83	Promotion to Football League One
2	Rotherham United (P)	46	24	7	15	74	59	+15	79	Promotion to Football League One
3	Port Vale (P)	46	21	15	10	87	52	+35	78	Promotion to Football League One
4	Burton Albion	46	22	10	14	71	65	+6	76	Qualification for League Two play-offs (Note: Four teams play for one spot and promotion to Football League One.)
5	Cheltenham Town	46	20	15	11	58	51	+7	75	Qualification for League Two play-offs

Updated to match(es) played on 27 April 2013. Source: BBC Sport
Rules for classification: 1) Points; 2) Goal difference; 3) Number of goals scored
(C) Champions; (P) Promoted

== Squad statistics ==
=== Appearances and goals ===
As of 7 April 2012

No.	Pos	Nat	Player	Total		League Two		FA Cup		League Cup		JP Trophy	
No.	Pos	Nat	Player	Apps	Goals	Apps	Goals	Apps	Goals	Apps	Goals	Apps	Goals
1	GK	(England) ENG	Stuart Nelson	48	0	45	0	1	0	2	0	0	0
2	DF	(England) ENG	Matt Fish	48	3	43+1	2	1	1	2	0	1	0
3	DF	(England) ENG	Joe Martin	40	2	38	2	0	0	1	0	1	0
4	MF	(England) ENG	Jack Payne (on loan to Peterborough United)	21	2	15+4	2	1	0	1	0	0	0
5	DF	(England) ENG	Danny East (on loan from Hull City)	2	0	1+1	0	0	0	0	0	0	0
6	DF	(England) ENG	Leon Legge	22	2	22	2	0	0	0	0	0	0
7	MF	(England) ENG	Chris Whelpdale	45	7	37+4	7	1	0	1+1	0	1	0
8	MF	(England) ENG	Charlie Lee	34	2	22+9	2	0+1	0	2	0	0	0
9	FW	(England) ENG	Danny Kedwell	41	16	27+11	14	0+1	1	2	1	0	0
10	MF	(England) ENG	Anton Robinson (on loan from Huddersfield Town)	14	0	12+2	0	0	0	0	0	0	0
12	DF	(England) ENG	Andy Frampton	32	0	21+9	0	0	0	1	0	1	0
14	MF	(England) ENG	Charlie Allen	35	2	22+10	2	0	0	2	0	1	0
15	DF	(England) ENG	Callum Davies	17	0	12+2	0	1	0	1+1	0	0	0
16	MF	(England) ENG	Lewis Montrose (on loan to Oxford United)	17	2	12+3	1	0	0	1	0	1	1
17	FW	(Wales) WAL	Adam Birchall	18	1	7+8	0	0+1	1	0+1	0	0+1	0
18	MF	(England) ENG	Bradley Dack	19	2	8+8	1	1	0	0+1	0	1	1
20	FW	(Jamaica) JAM	Deon Burton	42	13	31+9	12	1	1	1	0	0	0
21	GK	(England) ENG	Tommy Forecast (on loan from Southampton)	3	0	1+1	0	0	0	0	0	1	0
22	DF	(England) ENG	Jack Evans	1	0	0	0	0	0	0	0	0+1	0
23	MF	(England) ENG	Charlie Webster	0	0	0	0	0	0	0	0	0	0
24	MF	(England) ENG	Myles Weston	38	8	19+18	8	1	0	0	0	0	0
26	DF	(England) ENG	Adam Barrett	45	1	43	1	1	0	1	0	0	0
28	MF	(England) ENG	Steven Gregory	17	0	13+4	0	0	0	0	0	0	0
33	MF	(England) ENG	Mahlon Romeo	1	0	1	0	0	0	0	0	0	0
35	DF	(England) ENG	Devante McKain	1	0	0+1	0	0	0	0	0	0	0
36	MF	(England) ENG	Nathan Nyafli	1	1	0+1	1	0	0	0	0	0	0
37	DF	(England) ENG	Sam Muggleton	1	0	1	0	0	0	0	0	0	0
38	MF	(England) ENG	Harry Grant	1	0	1	0	0	0	0	0	0	0
39	MF	(England) ENG	Kane Haysman	1	0	0+1	0	0	0	0	0	0	0
	FW	(England) ENG	Ashley Miller	0	0	0	0	0	0	0	0	0	0
Players featured for club who have left:
5	DF	(England) ENG	Connor Essam	0	0	0	0	0	0	0	0	0	0
6	DF	(England) ENG	Tom Flanagan (on loan from Milton Keynes Dons)	15	1	12+1	1	0	0	1	0	1	0
10	FW	(England) ENG	Ben Strevens	14	2	4+7	1	0	0	1+1	1	1	0
11	MF	(England) ENG	Danny Jackman	13	1	6+3	1	1	0	2	0	1	0
19	FW	(England) ENG	Antonio German (on loan from Queens Park Rangers)	7	1	4+3	1	0	0	0	0	0	0
25	MF	(England) ENG	Michael Richardson (on loan from Newcastle United)	2	0	1+1	0	0	0	0	0	0	0
28	DF	(England) ENG	David Wright (on loan from Crystal Palace)	7	0	7	0	0	0	0	0	0	0
29	FW	(United States) USA	Robbie Findley (on loan from Nottingham Forest)	7	0	3+4	0	0	0	0	0	0	0
29	FW	(England) ENG	Cody McDonald (on loan from Coventry City)	7	4	6+1	4	0	0	0	0	0	0
30	DF	(France) FRA	Romain Vincelot (on loan from Brighton & Hove Albion)	10	1	8+1	1	1	0	0	0	0	0

==== Goalscoring record ====
Rank	No.	Po.	Name	League Two	FA Cup	League Cup	League Trophy	Total
1	9	FW	Danny Kedwell	14	1	1	0	16
2	20	FW	Deon Burton	12	1	0	0	13
3	24	MF	Myles Weston	8	0	0	0	8
4	7	MF	Chris Whelpdale	7	0	0	0	7
5	2	DF	Matt Fish	2	1	0	0	3
6	14	MF	Charlie Allen	2	0	0	0	2
6	18	MF	Bradley Dack	1	0	0	1	2
6	8	MF	Charlie Lee	2	0	0	0	2
6	6	DF	Leon Legge	2	0	0	0	2
6	3	DF	Joe Martin	2	0	0	0	2
6	16	MF	Lewis Montrose	1	0	0	1	2
6	10	FW	Ben Strevens	1	0	1	0	2
13	28	DF	Adam Barrett	1	0	0	0	1
13	17	FW	Adam Birchall	0	1	0	0	1
13	6	DF	Tom Flanagan	1	0	0	0	1
13	19	FW	Antonio German	1	0	0	0	1
13	11	DF	Danny Jackman	1	0	0	0	1
13	4	MF	Jack Payne	1	0	0	0	1
13	30	DF	Romain Vincelot	1	0	0	0	1
Total				60	4	2	2	68

== Transfers ==
=== In ===
No.	Pos.	Nat.	Name	Age	EU	Moving from	Type	Transfer window	Ends	Transfer fee	Source
14	MF	(England)	Charlie Allen	20	EU	Notts County	Free Transfer	Summer	2013	Free	
1	GK	(England)	Stuart Nelson	30	EU	Notts County	Free Transfer	Summer	2014	Free	
10	FW	(England)	Ben Strevens	32	EU	Wycombe Wanderers	Free Transfer	Summer	2013	Free	
20	FW	(Jamaica) (England)	Deon Burton	35	EU	Gabala (Azerbaijan)	Free Transfer	Summer	2013	Free	
26	DF	(England)	Adam Barrett	32	EU	Bournemouth	Transfer	Summer	2013	Undisclosed	
24	MF	(England)	Myles Weston	24	EU	Brentford	Transfer	Summer	2014	Undisclosed	
28	MF	(England)	Steven Gregory	25	EU	Bournemouth	Free Transfer	Winter	2014	Free	
6	DF	(England)	Leon Legge	27	EU	Brentford	Transfer	Winter	2015	Undisclosed	

=== Loans in ===
No.	Pos.	Name	Country	Age	Loan club	Started	Ended	Start source	End source
21	GK	Tommy Forecast	(England)	40	Southampton	20 July	31 May		
6	DF	Tom Flanagan	(Northern Ireland) (England)	21	Milton Keynes Dons	30 July	17 December		
28	DF	David Wright	(England)	32	Crystal Palace	12 September	19 October		
29	FW	Robbie Findley	(United States)	27	Nottingham Forest	21 September	29 October		
30	DF	Romain Vincelot	(France)	27	Brighton & Hove Albion	26 October	3 January		
6	DF	Leon Legge	(England)	27	Brentford	1 January	31 January		
29	FW	Cody McDonald	(England)	26	Coventry City	25 January	March		
10	MF	Anton Robinson	(England)	40	Huddersfield Town	31 January	31 May		
25	MF	Michael Richardson	(England)	21	Newcastle United	14 February	22 March		
19	FW	Antonio German	(England)	21	Brentford	26 February	26 March		

Sources: For loan start source see "Start source". For loan end source see "End source".
EU = if holds or not a European Union passport; Country: when 2 flags, 1st flag = country that plays for internationally, 2nd flag = country of birth; No. = number on jersey; P = Position (for position name, pause mouse pointer on abbreviation); Name = Name on jersey (for more extensive name, pause mouse pointer on name); In/Out = In: The player came in on loan, Out: The player went out on loan; Loan club = the club that the player moved on loan to or the club that the player came from on loan; Started = the date when the player's loan started; Ended = the date when the player's loan ended.

=== Out ===
No.	Pos.	Name	Country	Age	Type	Moving to	Transfer window	Transfer fee	Apps	Goals	Source
15	DF	Matthew Lawrence	(England)	52	Contract Ended		Summer	Free	73	0	
11	FW	Dennis Oli	(England)	28	Contract Ended	Wycombe Wanderers	Summer	Free	147	15	
17	MF	Danny Spiller	(England)	30	Contract Ended	Luton Town	Summer	Free	49	4	
5	DF	Simon King	(England)	29	Contract Ended	Inverness Caledonian Thistle (Scotland)	Summer	Free	112	3	
33	FW	Jo Kuffour	(England)	30	Contract Ended	Wycombe Wanderers	Summer	Free	31	9	
6	DF	Garry Richards	(England)	25	Contract Ended	Luton Town	Summer	Free	122	6	
10	MF	Curtis Weston	(England)	25	Contract Ended	Barnet	Summer	Free	166	19	
28	GK	Paulo Gazzaniga	(Argentina)	20	Transfer	Southampton	Summer	Undisclosed	22	0	
2	DF	Barry Fuller	(England)	27	Contract Ended	Barnet	Summer	Free	151	0	
5	DF	Connor Essam	(England)	20	Transfer	Crawley Town	Winter	Free	18	0	
11	DF	Danny Jackman	(England)	30	Transfer	Kidderminster Harriers	Winter	Undisclosed	99	7	

EU = if holds or not a European Union passport; Country: when 2 flags, 1st flag = country that plays for internationally, 2nd flag = country of birth; N = number on jersey; P = Position (for position name, pause mouse pointer on abbreviation); Name = Name on jersey (for more extensive name, pause mouse pointer on name); Age = age on the day of the signing; Moving from = only indicate the club the player was playing before start playing for this club in this season, for the type of the moving see Status column; Moving to = only indicates the club the player is going to play next, for the type of the moving see Status column; Ends = when the player's current contract ends; n/a = Not applicable; Apps = Total number of competitive appearances (including substitute appearances) at the club prior to departure; Goals = Total number of competitive goals scored at the club prior to departure.

=== Loans out ===
No.	Pos.	Name	Country	Age	Loan club	Started	Ended	Start source	End source
5	DF	Connor Essam	(England)	20	Luton Town	31 August	30 September		
17	FW	Adam Birchall	(Wales) (England)	27	Dartford	24 September	29 October		
19	GK	Ross Flitney	(England)	28	Eastleigh	25 October	25 November		
24	MF	Lewis Montrose	(England)	38	Oxford United	4 January	30 May		
4	MF	Jack Payne	(England)	34	Peterborough United	26 January	30 May		

Sources: For loan start source see "Start source". For loan end source see "End source".
EU = if holds or not a European Union passport; Country: when 2 flags, 1st flag = country that plays for internationally, 2nd flag = country of birth; No. = number on jersey; P = Position (for position name, pause mouse pointer on abbreviation); Name = Name on jersey (for more extensive name, pause mouse pointer on name); In/Out = In: The player came in on loan, Out: The player went out on loan; Loan club = the club that the player moved on loan to or the club that the player came from on loan; Started = the date when the player's loan started; Ended = the date when the player's loan ended.
