= 2011–12 Gillingham F.C. season =

English football club season

Gillingham F.C.
2011–12 season
- Chairman: Paul Scally
- Manager: Andy Hessenthaler
- FA Cup: Third Round (eliminated by Stoke City)
- Football League Cup: First Round (eliminated by Brighton & Hove Albion)
- Football League Trophy: Southern Section; Second Round (eliminated by Barnet)
- Top goalscorer: Danny Kedwell (12)
- Highest home attendance: League: 7,750 vs. Bristol Rovers, 17 December 2011; All: 10,360 vs. Stoke City, 7 January 2012
- Lowest home attendance: League: 3,751 vs. Barnet, 6 March 2012; All: 1,278 vs. Barnet, 4 October 2011
- Average home league attendance: 5,360
Home colours	Away colours

This page shows the progress of Gillingham in the 2011–12 season. This season they played their league games in Football League Two, the fourth tier of English football.

== League data ==
=== League table ===
Pos	Team	Pld	W	D	L	GF	GA	GD	Pts	Promotion, qualification or relegation
6	Cheltenham Town	46	23	8	15	66	50	+16	77	Qualification for League Two play-offs (Note: Four teams play for one spot and promotion to Football League One.)
7	Crewe Alexandra (O, P)	46	20	12	14	67	59	+8	72	Qualification for League Two play-offs
8	Gillingham	46	20	10	16	79	62	+17	70	
9	Oxford United	46	17	17	12	59	48	+11	68	
10	Rotherham United	46	18	13	15	67	63	+4	67	

Updated to match(es) played on 5 May 2012. Source: BBC Sport
Rules for classification: 1) Points; 2) Goal difference; 3) Number of goals scored
(O) Play-off winners; (P) Promoted

=== Results summary ===
Overall								Home						Away					
Pld	W	D	L	GF	GA	GD	Pts	W	D	L	GF	GA	GD	W	D	L	GF	GA	GD
46	19	11	16	83	65	+18	68	12	4	6	48	30	+18	7	7	10	35	35	0

Last updated: 5 May 2012.
Source: BBC Sport

== Results ==
=== Pre-season friendlies ===
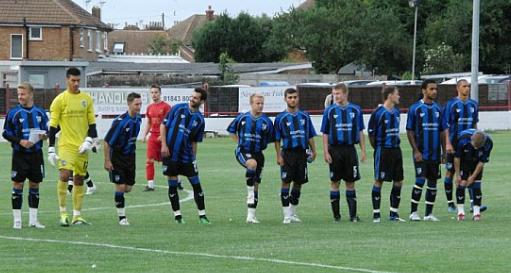
The Gillingham team line up before the friendly against Ramsgate

6 July 2011	Ashford United	0–3	Gillingham	The Homelands
13:00			Rooney 18'; Montrose 25'; Oli 41'	Attendance: 1,126

9 July 2011	Bromley	2–1	Gillingham	Hayes Lane
13:00	Hill 69', 90'		Rooney 61'

12 July 2011	Erith & Belvedere	0–5	Gillingham	Park View Road
19:30			Richards 10'; Rooney 12', 29'; Kedwell 85'; Cowan-Hall 89'

13 July 2011	Ramsgate	0–1	Gillingham	Southwood Stadium
19:30			Afusi 68'	Attendance: 497

15 July 2011	Dartford	2–5	Gillingham	Princes Park
19:45	Pallen 20', 26'		Oli 34'; Whelpdale 39'; Montrose 61'; Rooney 74', 87'	Attendance: 1,010

19 July 2011	Welling United	0–3	Gillingham	Park View Road
19:45			Birchall 47'; Martin 78' (o.g.); Kedwell 90'

23 July 2011	Gillingham	0–1	Millwall	Priestfield Stadium
13:00			Marquis 90'

25 July 2011	Braintree Town	1–1	Gillingham	Cressing Road
19:45	Martin 39'		Oli 45'

26 July 2011	Gillingham	0–1	Leyton Orient	Priestfield Stadium
19:30			Mooney 30'

30 July 2011	Gillingham	1–2	Peterborough United	Priestfield Stadium
15:00	Lawrence 41'		McCann 79'; Griffiths 88'

=== League Two ===
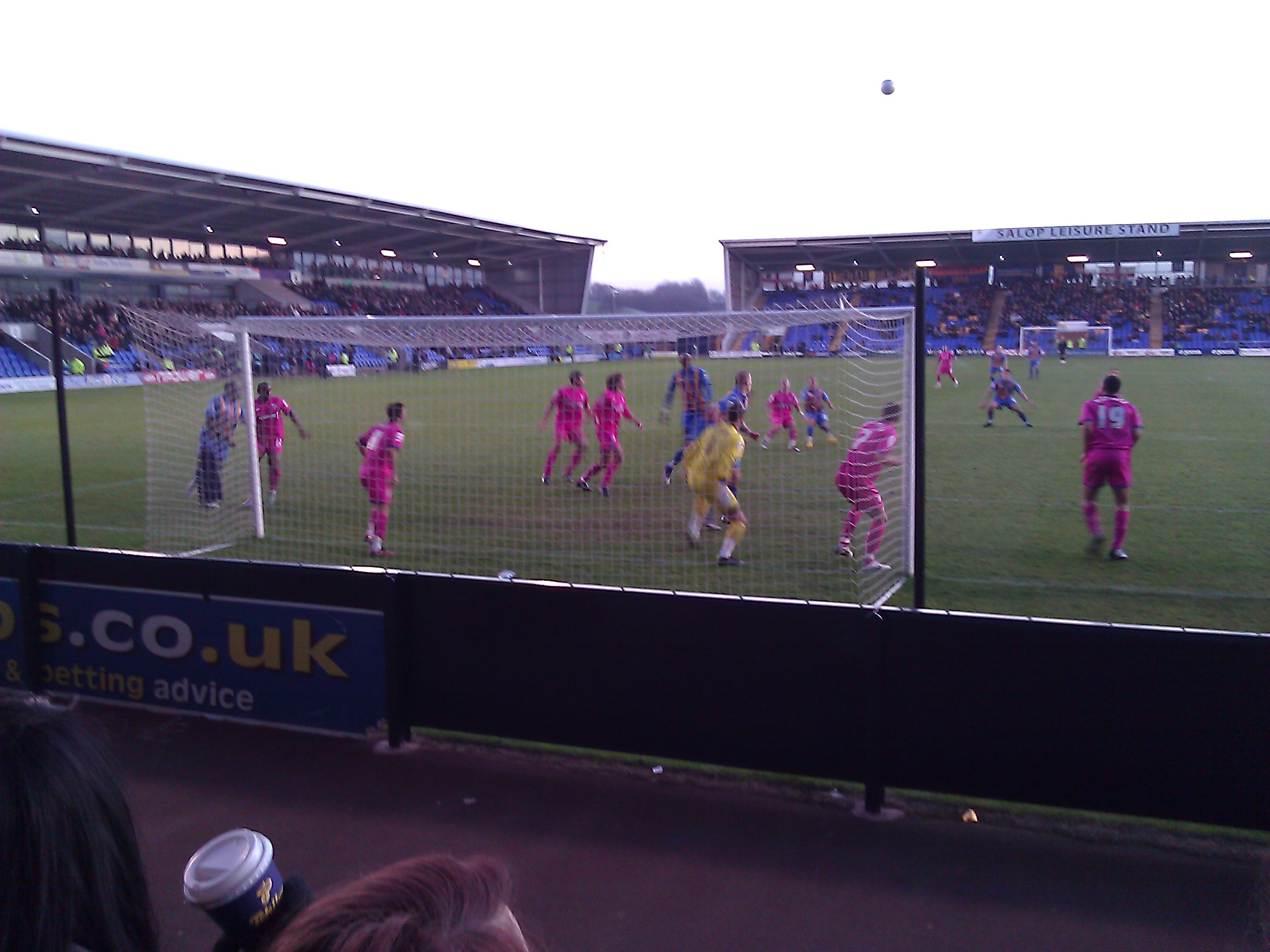
Goalmouth action from the game away to Shrewsbury Town in January (Gillingham in pink)

6 August 2011 1	Gillingham	1–0	Cheltenham Town	Priestfield Stadium
15:00	Montrose 26'			Attendance: 5,360

13 August 2011 2	Crewe Alexandra	1–2	Gillingham	Alexandra Stadium
15:00	Miller 74'		Whelpdale 23'; Spiller 25'	Attendance: 3,401

16 August 2011 3	Barnet	2–2	Gillingham	Underhill Stadium
19:45	McLeod 61', 90+4'		Spiller 6'; J. Payne 73'	Attendance: 2,466

20 August 2011 4	Gillingham	3–0	Plymouth Argyle	Priestfield Stadium
15:00	Kedwell 74', 90+4'; Rooney 86'			Attendance: 5,053

27 August 2011 5	Rotherham United	3–0	Gillingham	Don Valley Stadium
15:00	Harrison 53'; Grabban 63'; Evans 78'			Attendance: 3,740

3 September 2011 6	Gillingham	0–1	Shrewsbury Town	Priestfield Stadium
15:00			Wroe 90+4' (pen.)	Attendance: 4,869

10 September 2011 7	Gillingham	1–1	Accrington Stanley	Priestfield Stadium
15:00	Rooney 88' (pen.)		Craney 84'	Attendance: 4,619

13 September 2011 8	Southend United	1–0	Gillingham	Roots Hall
19:45	Phillips 87'			Attendance: 4,598

17 September 2011 9	Hereford United	1–6	Gillingham	Edgar Street
15:00	Winnall 87'		Nouble 19'; Richards 24'; Heath 40' (o.g.); Jackman 49'; Whelpdale 79'; Payne 83'	Attendance: 1,848

24 September 2011 10	Gillingham	3–1	Burton Albion	Priestfield Stadium
15:00	Kedwell 20', 50'; Nouble 49'		Kee 40'	Attendance: 4,946

1 October 2011 11	AFC Wimbledon	3–1	Gillingham	Kingsmeadow
15:00	Jolley 10', 12'; Midson 22'		Lee 67'	Attendance: 4,606

8 October 2011 12	Gillingham	1–1	Port Vale	Priestfield Stadium
15:00	Danny Kedwell 63'		Richards 33'	Attendance: 4,676

15 October 2011 13	Torquay United	2–5	Gillingham	Plainmoor
15:00	Robertson 47'; Stevens 51'		Kuffour 6', 39'; Rooney 56' (pen.); Nouble 78'; Whelpdale 89'	Attendance: 2,582

22 October 2011 14	Gillingham	1–0	Oxford United	Priestfield Stadium
15:00	Montrose 45'			Attendance: 5,819

25 October 2011 15	Swindon Town	2–0	Gillingham	The County Ground
19:45	Ritchie 80'; Smith 90+1'			Attendance: 7,787

29 October 2011 16	Morecambe	2–1	Gillingham	Globe Arena
15:00	Hunter 8'; Ellison 68'		Nouble 90+5' (pen.)	Attendance: 2,067

5 November 2011 17	Gillingham	4–3	Northampton Town	Priestfield Stadium
15:00	Kuffour 11', 30', 45+1' (pen.); Kedwell 90+1' (pen.)		Berahino 35', 60'; Langmead 54'	Attendance: 4,704

19 November 2011 18	Aldershot Town	1–2	Gillingham	Recreation Ground
15:00	Davies 80'		Nouble 6'; Whelpdale 30'	Attendance: 3,449

26 November 2011 19	Gillingham	0–0	Bradford City	Priestfield Stadium
15:00				Attendance: 7,074

10 December 2011 20	Macclesfield Town	0–0	Gillingham	Moss Rose
15:00				Attendance: 1,724

17 December 2011 21	Gillingham	4–1	Bristol Rovers	Priestfield Stadium
15:00	Montrose 8'; Kedwell 45+5' (pen.), 73' (pen.); Jackman 68'		Carayol 52'	Attendance: 7,750

26 December 2011 22	Crawley Town	1–2	Gillingham	Broadfield Stadium
15:00	Tubbs 34' (pen.)		Kuffour 50', 52'	Attendance: 4,255

30 December 2011 23	Dagenham & Redbridge	2–1	Gillingham	Victoria Road
19:45	Bingham 22'; Woodall 65'		Kedwell 7'	Attendance: 3,120

2 January 2012 24	Gillingham	1–0	Aldershot Town	Priestfield Stadium
15:00	Jackman 46'; Martin (yellow card) 2' (yellow-red card) 61'			Attendance: 5,432

14 January 2012 25	Shrewsbury Town	2–0	Gillingham	Greenhous Meadow
15:00	Cansdell-Sherriff 30'; Wright 87'			Attendance: 4,940

21 January 2012 26	Gillingham	3–4	AFC Wimbledon	Priestfield Stadium
15:00	Tomlin 4'; Kuffour 54'; Tomlin 62'		Moore 60'; Richards 73' (o.g.); Midson 80' (pen.); Jake Midson 89'	Attendance: 6,326

24 January 2012 27	Accrington Stanley	4–3	Gillingham	Crown Ground
15:00	Smith 1', 19', 45'; Joyce 31'		Jackman 7'; Tomlin 70', 85'	Attendance: 1,734

4 February 2012	Gillingham	–	Hereford United	Priestfield Stadium
15:00

11 February 2012	Burton Albion	–	Gillingham	Pirelli Stadium
15:00

13 February 2012 28	Gillingham	1–2	Southend United	Priestfield Stadium
19:45	Tomlin 87'		Dickinson 10'; Martin 31' (o.g.)	Attendance: 4,441

18 February 2012 29	Portvale	2–1	Gillingham	Vale Park
15:00	Rigg 81'; Richards 90' (pen.)		Whelpdale 45'	Attendance: 4,027

21 February 2012 30	Gillingham	0–0	Rotherham United	Priestfield Stadium
19:45				Attendance: 3,248

25 February 2012 31	Gillingham	2–0	Torquay United	Priestfield Stadium
15:00	King 51'; Kedwell 90' (pen.)			Attendance: 4,865

28 February 2012 32	Gillingham	5–4	Hereford United	Priestfield Stadium
19:45	Whelpdale 45'; Kedwell 46'; Lee 81', 88'; Tomlin 90'		Purdie 4' (pen.); Barkhuizen 7', 70'; Evans 80'	Attendance: 3,784

3 March 2012 33	Plymouth Argyle	0–1	Gillingham	Home Park
15:00			Martin 23'	Attendance: 6,382

6 March 2012 34	Gillingham	3–1	Barnet	Priestfield Stadium
19:45	Oli 47'; Obita 76'; Lee 87'		Kamdjo 39'	Attendance: 3,751

10 March 2012 35	Gillingham	3–4	Crewe Alexandra	Priestfield Stadium
15:00	Payne 48'; Whelpdale 67'; Miller 73'		Powell 27', 53'; Leitch-Smith 52'; Clayton 90'	Attendance: 5,428

17 March 2012 36	Cheltenham Town	0–3	Gillingham	Whaddon Road
15:00			Obita 45', 54'; Whelpdale 83'	Attendance: 3,137

20 March 2012 37	Gillingham	0–1	Crawley Town	Priestfield Stadium
19:45			Bulman 50'	Attendance: 5,204

24 March 2012 38	Bradford City	2–2	Gillingham	Valley Parade
15:00	Wells 71'; Hanson 84'		Montrose 25'; Ramsden 56' (o.g.)	Attendance: 9,858

27 March 2012 39	Burton Albion	1–0	Gillingham	Pirelli Stadium
19:45	Fish 54' (o.g.)			Attendance: 1,714

31 March 2012 40	Gillingham	2–0	Macclesfield Town	Priestfield Stadium
15:00	Fish 51'; Whelpdale 85'			Attendance: 4,562

6 April 2012 41	Bristol Rovers	2–2	Gillingham	Memorial Stadium
15:00	Richards 59'; Carayol 80'		Whelpdale 56'; Oli 90'	Attendance: 6,160

9 April 2012 42	Gillingham	1–2	Dagenham & Redbridge	Priestfield Stadium
15:00	Vine 58'		Woodall 38'; Green 73'	Attendance: 5,773

14 April 2012 43	Oxford United	0–0	Gillingham	Kassam Stadium
15:00				Attendance: 7,322

21 April 2012 44	Gillingham	3–1	Swindon Town	Priestfield Stadium
15:00	Kedwell 26'; Whelpdale 52', 90'		McCormack 81'	Attendance: 6,390

28 April 2012 45	Northampton Town	1–1	Gillingham	Sixfields Stadium
15:00	Wilson 41'		Kuffour 54'	Attendance: 5,832

5 May 2012 46	Gillingham	2–0	Morecambe	Priestfield Stadium
15:00	Lee 18', 76'			Attendance: 4,382

=== FA Cup ===
12 November 2011 First Round	AFC Bournemouth	3–3	Gillingham	Dean Court
15:00 GMT	Purches 20'; Zubar 59'; Malone 60'	Report	Payne 37'; Jackman 71'; Kedwell 90'	Attendance: 4,282; Referee: Dave Phillips

22 November 2011 Replay	Gillingham	3–2	AFC Bournemouth	Priestfield Stadium
19:45 GMT	Weston 21'; Richards 75'; S. Payne 82'	Report	Frampton 55' (o.g.); Arter 90+1'	Attendance: 4,321; Referee: Fred Graham

3 December 2011 Second Round	Leyton Orient	0–1	Gillingham	Brisbane Road
15:00 GMT		Report	Weston 45+1'	Attendance: 3,763; Referee: Phil Gibbs

7 January 2012 Third Round	Gillingham	1–3	Stoke City	Priestfield Stadium
15:00 GMT	Kedwell 16'	Report	Walters 34'; Jerome 43'; Huth 49'	Referee: Mark Halsey

=== League Cup ===
9 August 2011 Round 1	Brighton & Hove Albion	1–0	Gillingham	Falmer Stadium
19:45	Barnes 67' (pen.)			Attendance: 16,295

=== Football League Trophy ===
4 October 2011 SS Round 2	Gillingham	1–3	Barnet	Priestfield Stadium
19:00	Richards 5'	Report	McLeod 11' (pen.), 84'; Marshall 72'	Attendance: 1,278

== Squad statistics ==
=== Appearances and goals ===
As of 21 April 2012

No.	Pos	Nat	Player	Total		League Two		FA Cup		League Cup		JP Trophy	
No.	Pos	Nat	Player	Apps	Goals	Apps	Goals	Apps	Goals	Apps	Goals	Apps	Goals
1	GK	(England) ENG	Ross Flitney	31	0	27+0	0	3+0	0	1+0	0	0+0	0
2	DF	(England) ENG	Barry Fuller	10	0	9+0	0	0+0	0	1+0	0	0+0	0
3	DF	(England) ENG	Andy Frampton	31	0	24+1	0	4+0	0	1+0	0	1+0	0
4	MF	(England) ENG	Charlie Lee	37	4	27+5	4	4+0	0	1+0	0	0+0	0
5	DF	(England) ENG	Simon King	9	1	8+1	1	0+0	0	0+0	0	0+0	0
6	DF	(England) ENG	Garry Richards	28	3	24+0	1	3+0	1	0+0	0	1+0	1
7	MF	(England) ENG	Chris Whelpdale	43	12	33+5	12	3+0	0	1+0	0	0+1	0
8	MF	(England) ENG	Jack Payne	34	3	28+1	2	4+0	1	1+0	0	0+0	0
9	FW	(England) ENG	Danny Kedwell	44	14	35+3	12	4+0	2	1+0	0	0+1	0
10	MF	(England) ENG	Curtis Weston	34	2	21+8	0	3+0	2	0+1	0	1+0	0
11	FW	(England) ENG	Dennis Oli	25	2	4+17	2	1+3	0	0+0	0	0+0	0
12	MF	(England) ENG	Joe Martin	37	1	30+3	1	3+0	0	1+0	0	0+0	0
15	DF	(England) ENG	Matthew Lawrence	29	0	24+2	0	2+0	0	1+0	0	0+0	0
16	DF	(England) ENG	Matt Fish	25	1	16+4	1	1+2	0	0+1	0	1+0	0
17	MF	(England) ENG	Danny Spiller	15	2	6+8	2	0+0	0	1+0	0	0+0	0
18	MF	(England) ENG	Danny Jackman	42	5	34+4	4	3+0	1	0+0	0	1+0	0
19	MF	(England) ENG	Lewis Montrose	41	4	26+9	4	3+1	0	1+0	0	1+0	0
20	DF	(England) ENG	Callum Davies	3	0	0+2	0	0+0	0	0+0	0	0+1	0
21	MF	(England) ENG	Dean Rance	1	0	0+0	0	0+1	0	0+0	0	0+0	0
22	DF	(England) ENG	Connor Essam	16	0	15+1	0	0+0	0	0+0	0	0+0	0
23	FW	(England) ENG	Rowan Vine	7	1	3+4	1	0+0	0	0+0	0	0+0	0
24	DF	(England) ENG	Jack Evans	7	0	4+3	0	0+0	0	0+0	0	0+0	0
25	MF	(England) ENG	Alex Brown	0	0	0+0	0	0+0	0	0+0	0	0+0	0
27	MF	(England) ENG	Tom Brunt	0	0	0+0	0	0+0	0	0+0	0	0+0	0
28	GK	(Argentina) ARG	Paulo Gazzaniga	17	0	14+1	0	1+0	0	0+0	0	1+0	0
30	FW	(Wales) WAL	Adam Birchall	0	0	0+0	0	0+0	0	0+0	0	0+0	0
31	FW	(England) ENG	Ashley Miller	5	1	2+3	1	0+0	0	0+0	0	0+0	0
33	FW	(Ghana) GHA	Jo Kuffour	28	8	23+4	8	0+0	0	0+0	0	1+0	0
37	DF	(England) ENG	Olly Lee	7	0	5+2	0	0+0	0	0+0	0	0+0	0
38	FW	(England) ENG	Gavin Tomlin	10	6	9+1	6	0+0	0	0+0	0	0+0	0
	MF	(England) ENG	Nicky Southall	0	0	0+0	0	0+0	0	0+0	0	0+0	0
Players featured for club who have left:
	FW	(England) ENG	Frank Nouble	14	5	12+1	5	0+0	0	0+0	0	1+0	0
	MF	(England) ENG	Luke Rooney	19	3	11+6	3	1+0	0	0+0	0	1+0	0
	MF	(England) ENG	Jordan Obita	6	3	5+1	3	0+0	0	0+0	0	0+0	0
	FW	(England) ENG	Stefan Payne	19	2	0+14	1	1+3	1	0+1	0	0+0	0

=== Top scorers ===
Place	Position	Nation	Number	Name	League Two	FA Cup	League Cup	JP Trophy	Total
1	FW	(England)	9	Danny Kedwell	12	2	0	0	14
2	MF	(England)	7	Chris Whelpdale	12	0	0	0	12
3	FW	(Ghana)	33	Jo Kuffour	8	0	0	0	8
4	FW	(England)	38	Gavin Tomlin	6	0	0	0	6
5	MF	(England)	18	Danny Jackman	4	1	0	0	5
=	FW	(England)	~~29~~	Frank Nouble	5	0	0	0	5
7	MF	(England)	4	Charlie Lee	4	0	0	0	4
=	MF	(England)	19	Lewis Montrose	4	0	0	0	4
9	MF	(England)	8	Jack Payne	2	1	0	0	3
=	MF	(England)	12	Jordan Obita	3	0	0	0	3
=	DF	(England)	6	Garry Richards	1	1	0	1	3
=	MF	(England)	~~14~~	Luke Rooney	3	0	0	0	3
13	FW	(England)	11	Dennis Oli	2	0	0	0	2
=	MF	(England)	~~23~~	Stefan Payne	1	1	0	2	
=	MF	(England)	17	Danny Spiller	2	0	0	0	2
=	MF	(England)	10	Curtis Weston	0	2	0	0	2
17	DF	(England)	16	Matt Fish	1	0	0	0	1
=	DF	(England)	5	Simon King	1	0	0	0	1
=	MF	(England)	12	Joe Martin	1	0	0	0	1
=	FW	(England)	31	Ashley Miller	1	0	0	0	1
=	FW	(England)	23	Rowan Vine	1	0	0	0	1
				TOTALS	74	8	0	1	83

== Awards ==
End of Season Awards	Winner
Supporters Player of the Season	Danny Jackman
Away Supporters Player of the Season	Jack Payne
MEMS Player of the Season	Danny Jackman
Players' Player of the Season	Danny Jackman
Young Player of the Season	Paulo Gazzaniga
Goal of the Season	Chris Whelpdale vs Torquay United

== Transfers ==
Players transferred in
Date	Pos.	Name	Previous club	Fee	Ref.
1 July 2011	DF	(England) Matt Fish	(England) Dover Athletic	Free Transfer	
1 July 2011	GK	(England) Ross Flitney	(England) Dover Athletic	Free Transfer	
1 July 2011	DF	(England) Andy Frampton	(England) Millwall	Free Transfer	
1 July 2011	FW	(England) Danny Kedwell	(England) AFC Wimbledon	Undisclosed Fee	
1 July 2011	MF	(England) Lewis Montrose	(England) Wycombe Wanderers	Free Transfer	
1 July 2011	MF	(England) Chris Whelpdale	(England) Peterborough United	Undisclosed Fee	
5 July 2011	MF	(England) Charlie Lee	(England) Peterborough United	Undisclosed Fee	
12 July 2011	FW	(Wales) Adam Birchall	(England) Dover Athletic	Undisclosed Fee	
28 July 2011	GK	(Argentina) Paulo Gazzaniga	(Spain) Valencia	Free Transfer	
12 January 2012	FW	(Ghana) Jo Kuffour	(England) Bristol Rovers	Free Transfer	
Players transferred out
Date	Pos.	Name	Subsequent club	Fee	Ref
17 June 2011	MF	(England) Chris Palmer	(England) Burton Albion	Free Transfer	
22 June 2011	GK	(Northern Ireland) Alan Julian	(England) Stevenage	Free Transfer	
29 June 2011	FW	(England) Andy Barcham	(England) Scunthorpe United	Free Transfer	
29 June 2011	GK	(England) Lance Cronin	(England) Bristol Rovers	Free Transfer	
8 July 2011	DF	(England) John Nutter	(England) Lincoln City	Free Transfer	
8 July 2011	DF	(England) Tony Sinclair	(England) Lincoln City	Free Transfer	
17 January 2012	MF	(England) Luke Rooney	(England) Swindon Town	Undisclosed	
27 January 2012	FW	(England) Stefan Payne	(England) Aldershot Town	Free Transfer	
Players loaned in
Date from	Pos.	Name	From	Date to	Ref.
15 September 2011	FW	(England) Frank Nouble	(England) West Ham United	17 December 2011	
30 September 2011	FW	(Ghana) Jo Kuffour	(England) Bristol Rovers	30 December 2011	
12 January 2012	FW	(England) Gavin Tomlin	(England) Dagenham & Redbridge	30 May 2012	
17 February 2012	MF	(England) Olly Lee	(England) West Ham United	15 April 2012	
2 March 2012	MF	(England) Jordan Obita	(England) Reading	2 April 2012	
22 March 2012	FW	(England) Rowan Vine	(England) Queens Park Rangers	30 May 2012	
Players loaned out
Date	Pos.	Name	Club	End Date	Ref.
11 August 2011	ST	(England) Dean Rance	(England) Bishop's Stortford F.C.	September 2011	
11 August 2011	DF	(England) Connor Essam	(England) Bishop's Stortford F.C.	September 2011	
16 August 2011	GK	(England) Darren Hawkes	(England) Ramsgate F.C.	September 2011	
31 August 2011	DF	(England) Simon King	(England) Plymouth Argyle	7 November 2011	
25 October 2011	DF	(England) Callum Davies	(England) Thurrock	21 November 2011	
12 December 2011	DF	(England) Jack Evans	(England) Welling United	3 March 2012	
12 December 2011	DF	(England) Connor Essam	(England) Dartford	3 March 2012	
2 March 2012	MF	(England) Dean Rance	(England) Dover Athletic	2 April 2012	
