= Jack Payne (footballer, born 1991) =

English footballer

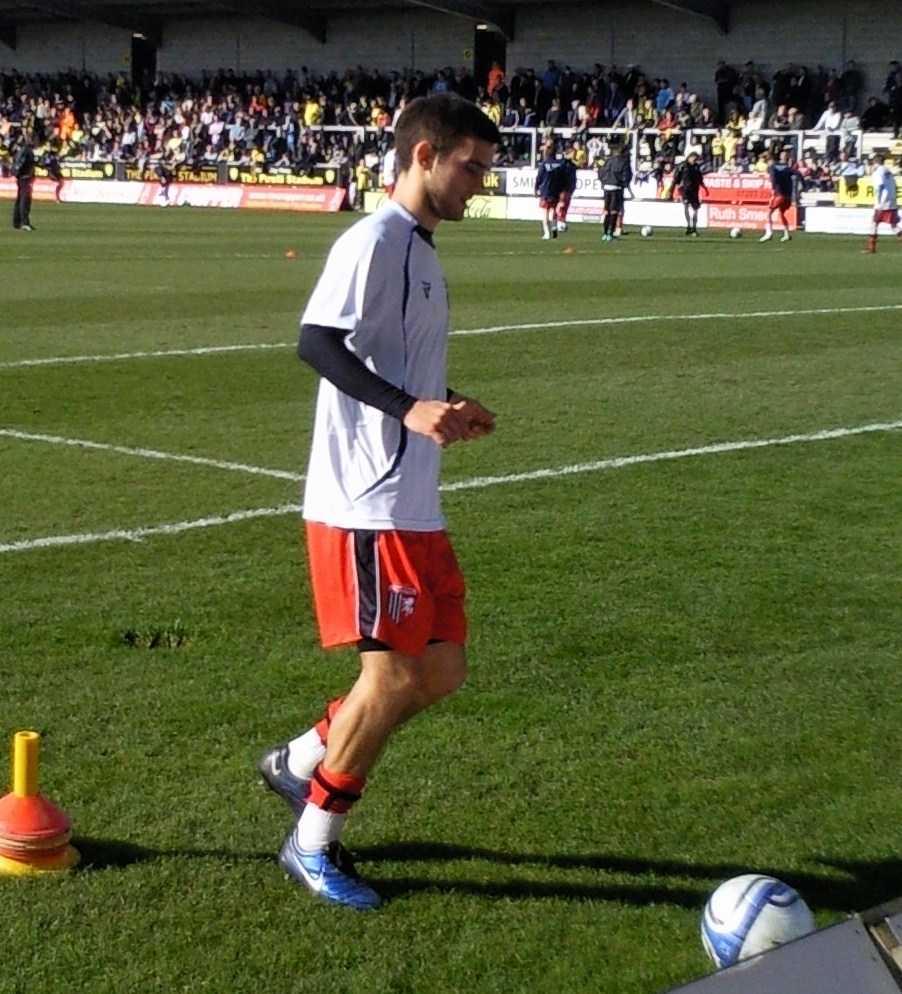
- Payne with Gillingham in 2011

Personal information
- Full name: Jack Stephen Payne
- Date of birth: 5 December 1991 (age 34)
- Place of birth: Gravesend, England
- Height: 1.75 m (5 ft 9 in)
- Position: Midfielder

Team information
- Current team: Boreham Wood (player-assistant manager)
- Number: 4

Youth career
- –2008: Gillingham

Senior career*
Years	Team	Apps	(Gls)
2008–2013	Gillingham	101	(5)
2013	→ Peterborough United (loan)	14	(0)
2013–2016	Peterborough United	74	(5)
2015–2016	→ Leyton Orient (loan)	29	(1)
2016–2017	Blackpool	35	(1)
2017–2019	Ebbsfleet United	55	(0)
2018	→ Eastleigh (loan)	5	(0)
2019–2021	Eastleigh	78	(2)
2021–2022	Crawley Town	35	(1)
2022–	Boreham Wood	76	(3)

International career
2024	England C	1	(0)
- * Club domestic league appearances and goals as of 22:07, 2 April 2024 (UTC)

Jack Stephen Payne (born 5 December 1991) is an English professional footballer who plays as a midfielder for National League side Boreham Wood where he holds the role of player-assistant manager.

== Career ==
=== Gillingham ===
He made his debut for Gillingham in a League Two match against Chester City on 25 October 2008, and signed an 18-month professional contract three months later. He was voted Young Player of the Year for Gillingham at the end of the 2008–09 season. He made his first senior start for the club on 8 August 2009 in a 5–0 League One victory over Swindon Town. Payne's form created interest from then Championship side Reading though no offer was ever lodged. Payne then signed a two-year extension in November 2011 to keep him at the club until 2015.

=== Peterborough United ===
In January 2013, Payne signed on loan for Championship club Peterborough United until the end of the season, with a view to a permanent move. Payne had been due to sign for the Posh in the summer of 2012, however the deal fell through. Payne made 14 appearances whilst on loan at Peterborough, having made his debut for the club on 2 February 2013 as an 84th-minute substitute in a 2–2 draw with Burnley. Peterborough finished 22nd in the Championship and were relegated to League One, whilst parent club Gillingham were promoted to League One as League Two champions. He joined Peterborough United on a permanent deal for an undisclosed fee in summer 2013. Payne featured as a 67th minute substitute when Peterborough defeated Chesterfield 3–1 in the 2014 Football League Trophy final at Wembley. Following the conclusion of the 2014–15 season, he was transfer-listed by the club.

On 1 September 2015, Payne went on a season-long loan to League Two club Leyton Orient, with an option for a permanent deal. He made his debut for the club on 12 September 2015 in a 1–1 draw with Cambridge United. He scored his first goal for the club on 24 October 2015 with the only goal of a 1–0 win away to Morecambe. He made 32 appearances for Orient across the 2015–16 season, and scored once.

=== Blackpool ===
In August 2016 he signed for Blackpool on a one-year deal. He left the club in May 2017 after his contract ended, shortly after featuring for the club in their League Two play-off final victory over Exeter City.

=== Ebbsfleet United ===
Payne signed for side Ebbsfleet United in June 2017. He made his debut for the Kent side in a 2–2 draw away to Guiseley on the opening day of the 2017–18 season.

He joined fellow National League side Eastleigh on a one-month loan in September 2018.

=== Eastleigh ===
Having rejected the offer of a new deal at Ebbsfleet, Payne joined Eastleigh permanently in June 2019, signing a one-year deal with the Hampshire side. He made his second debut for the side in a 1–0 victory over Notts County on 3 August 2019.

=== Crawley Town ===
Payne joined League Two side Crawley Town for an undisclosed fee on 1 July 2021 on an initial one-year deal, with the option of an additional year.

=== Boreham Wood ===
In July 2022, Payne joined Boreham Wood of the National League following the cancellation of his contract with Crawley.

In June 2025, Payne was appointed player-assistant manager following the departure of Mark Ricketts.

== Career statistics ==
As of 26 December 2022

Appearances and goals by club, season and competition
Club	Season	League			FA Cup		League Cup		Other		Total	
Club	Season	Division	Apps	Goals	Apps	Goals	Apps	Goals	Apps	Goals	Apps	Goals
Gillingham	2008–09	League Two	2	0	0	0	0	0	0	0	2	0
Gillingham	2009–10	League One	19	0	0	0	1	0	1 (Note: Appearances in Football League Trophy)	0	21	0
Gillingham	2010–11	League Two	31	1	1	0	1	0	1	0	34	1
Gillingham	2011–12	League Two	30	2	4	1	1	0	0	0	35	3
Gillingham	2012–13	League Two	19	2	1	0	1	0	0	0	21	2
Gillingham	Total		101	5	6	1	4	0	2	0	113	6
Peterborough United (loan)	2012–13	Championship	14	0	0	0	0	0	0	0	14	0
Peterborough United	2013–14	League One	32	2	3	0	3	1	6 (Note: 4 appearances in Football League Trophy, 2 appearances in League One play-offs)	0	44	3
Peterborough United	2014–15	League One	41	3	2	0	1	0	1	0	45	3
Peterborough United	2015–16	League One	2	0	0	0	0	0	0	0	2	0
Peterborough United	Total		75	5	5	0	4	1	7	0	91	6
Leyton Orient (loan)	2015–16	League Two	29	1	3	0	0	0	0	0	32	1
Blackpool	2016–17	League Two	35	1	4	0	0	0	5 (Note: 2 appearances in EFL Trophy, 3 appearances in League Two play-offs)	0	44	1
Ebbsfleet United	2017–18	National League	23	0	0	0	—		2 (Note: Appearance(s) in FA Trophy)	0	25	0
Ebbsfleet United	2018–19	National League	32	0	3	0	—		1	0	36	0
Ebbsfleet United	Total		55	0	3	0	0	0	3	0	61	0
Eastleigh (loan)	2018–19	National League	5	0	0	0	—		0	0	5	0
Eastleigh	2019–20	National League	37	1	6	0	—		2	0	45	1
Eastleigh	2020–21	National League	41	1	1	0	—		0	0	42	1
Eastleigh	Total		78	2	7	0	0	0	2	0	87	2
Boreham Wood	2022–23	National League	22	2	2	0	—		—		24	2
Career total			414	16	30	1	8	1	19	0	469	18

== Honours ==
Gillingham

- Football League Two: 2012–13

Peterborough

- Football League Trophy: 2013–14

Blackpool

- EFL League Two play-offs: 2017

Boreham Wood

- National League South play-offs: 2025

Individual

- Gillingham Young Player of the Season: 2008–09, 2009–10, 2010–11
