= Dean Rance =

English footballer

Personal information
- Full name: Dean James Robert Rance
- Date of birth: 24 September 1991 (age 35)
- Place of birth: Maidstone, England
- Height: 5 ft 11 in (1.80 m)
- Position: Midfielder

Team information
- Current team: Folkestone Invicta

Youth career
- –2009: Gillingham

Senior career*
Years	Team	Apps	(Gls)
2009–2012	Gillingham	0	(0)
2010	→ Maidstone United (loan)		
2011	→ Maidstone United (loan)		
2011	→ Bishop's Stortford (loan)	7	(3)
2011	→ Bishop's Stortford (loan)	8	(0)
2012	→ Dover Athletic (loan)	2	(0)
2012–2013	Dover Athletic	35	(0)
2013–2019	Ebbsfleet United	193	(9)
2019–2020	Aldershot Town	31	(2)
2020–2023	Dagenham & Redbridge	78	(5)
2023–2024	Scunthorpe United	7	(0)
2024	→ Folkestone Invicta (loan)	16	(0)
2024–	Folkestone Invicta	0	(0)
- * Club domestic league appearances and goals as of 12:24, 6 May 2024 (UTC)

Dean James Robert Rance (born 24 September 1991) is an English footballer who plays for Folkestone Invicta as a defensive midfielder.

== Career ==
Born in Maidstone, Kent, Rance joined the Gillingham Centre of Excellence at the age of eight. He started an apprenticeship with the club during the summer of 2008 and his good form for the youth team earned him a call-up for the first team squad, being named on the bench for Gillingham's FA Cup game against Aston Villa in January 2009. Rance finished the 2009–10 season as the youth team's top goalscorer, and in May 2010 signed his first professional contract with the club. However, his opportunities in the first team were limited in the 2010–11 season by a foot injury sustained during a pre-season friendly.

Despite this, he impressed during loan spells with non-League sides Maidstone United and Bishop's Stortford. He signed a new one-year contract with Gillingham ahead of the 2011–12 season, during which he made his first team debut as a substitute in an FA Cup first round replay against Bournemouth in November 2011.

Rance was loaned out to Conference South side Dover Athletic on a one-month loan on 2 March 2012. He was released by Gillingham in May 2012 and signed a permanent contract with Dover.

Ahead of the 2013–14 season, Rance signed for Ebbsfleet United. Rance quickly established himself as a fan favourite at Stonebridge Road and was named players' player of the season despite being sent off in the play-off final second leg at Bromley and thus missing the play-off final against his former club, Dover.

In March 2023, Rance signed for Scunthorpe United on a short-term deal until the end of the season, with the option for a further year. He joined Isthmian League Premier Division club Folkestone Invicta on a one-month loan deal in January 2024, managed by Rance's former Ebbsfleet United teammate Andy Drury. On 1 May 2024, he joined the club permanently, signing a two-year deal.

== Career statistics ==
As of end of 2023–24 season

Appearances and goals by club, season and competition
Club	Season	League			FA Cup		League Cup		Other		Total	
Club	Season	Division	Apps	Goals	Apps	Goals	Apps	Goals	Apps	Goals	Apps	Goals
Gillingham	2009–10	League One	0	0	0	0	0	0	0	0	0	0
Gillingham	2010–11	League Two	0	0	1	0	0	0	0	0	1	0
Gillingham	2011–12	League Two	0	0	0	0	0	0	0	0	0	0
Gillingham	Total		0	0	1	0	0	0	0	0	1	0
Bishop's Stortford (loan)	2010–11	Conference South	7	3	—		—		—		7	3
Bishop's Stortford (loan)	2011–12	Conference North	8	0	—		—		—		8	0
Bishop's Stortford (loan)	Total		15	3	—		—		—		15	3
Dover Athletic (loan)	2011–12	Conference South	2	0	—		—		—		2	0
Dover Athletic	2012–13	Conference South	35	0	2	0	—		5 (Note: Three appearances in Conference South play-offs, two in FA Trophy)	0	42	0
Dover Athletic	Total		37	0	2	0	—		5	0	44	0
Ebbsfleet United	2013–14	Conference South	37	3	4	0	—		6 (Note: Two appearances in Conference South play-offs, four in FA Trophy)	0	47	3
Ebbsfleet United	2014–15	Conference South	18	1	2	0	—		4 (Note: Appearances in FA Trophy)	0	24	1
Ebbsfleet United	2015–16	National League South	37	0	2	0	—		5	0	44	0
Ebbsfleet United	2016–17	National League South	39	2	2	0	—		7 (Note: Three appearances and one goal in National League South play-offs, four in FA Trophy)	1	48	3
Ebbsfleet United	2017–18	National League	34	3	3	0	—		4 (Note: Two appearances in National League play-offs, two in FA Trophy)	0	39	3
Ebbsfleet United	2018–19	National League	28	0	1	0	—		1	0	30	0
Ebbsfleet United	Total		193	9	14	0	—		27	1	234	10
Aldershot Town	2019–20	National League	31	2	1	0	—		1	0	33	2
Dagenham & Redbridge	2020–21	National League	26	2	1	0	—		1	0	28	2
Dagenham & Redbridge	2021–22	National League	23	1	2	0	—		4	0	29	1
Dagenham & Redbridge	2022–23	National League	29	2	4	0	—		2	0	35	2
Dagenham & Redbridge	Total		78	5	7	0	—		7	0	92	5
Scunthorpe United	2022–23	National League	7	0	—		—		—		7	0
Scunthorpe United	2023–24	National League North	0	0	0	0	—		0	0	0	0
Scunthorpe United	Total		7	0	0	0	0	0	0	0	7	0
Folkestone Invicta (loan)	2023–24	Isthmian League Premier Division	16	0	0	0	—		0	0	16	0
Career totals			377	19	25	0	0	0	40	1	442	20
