= Lewis Montrose =

English footballer

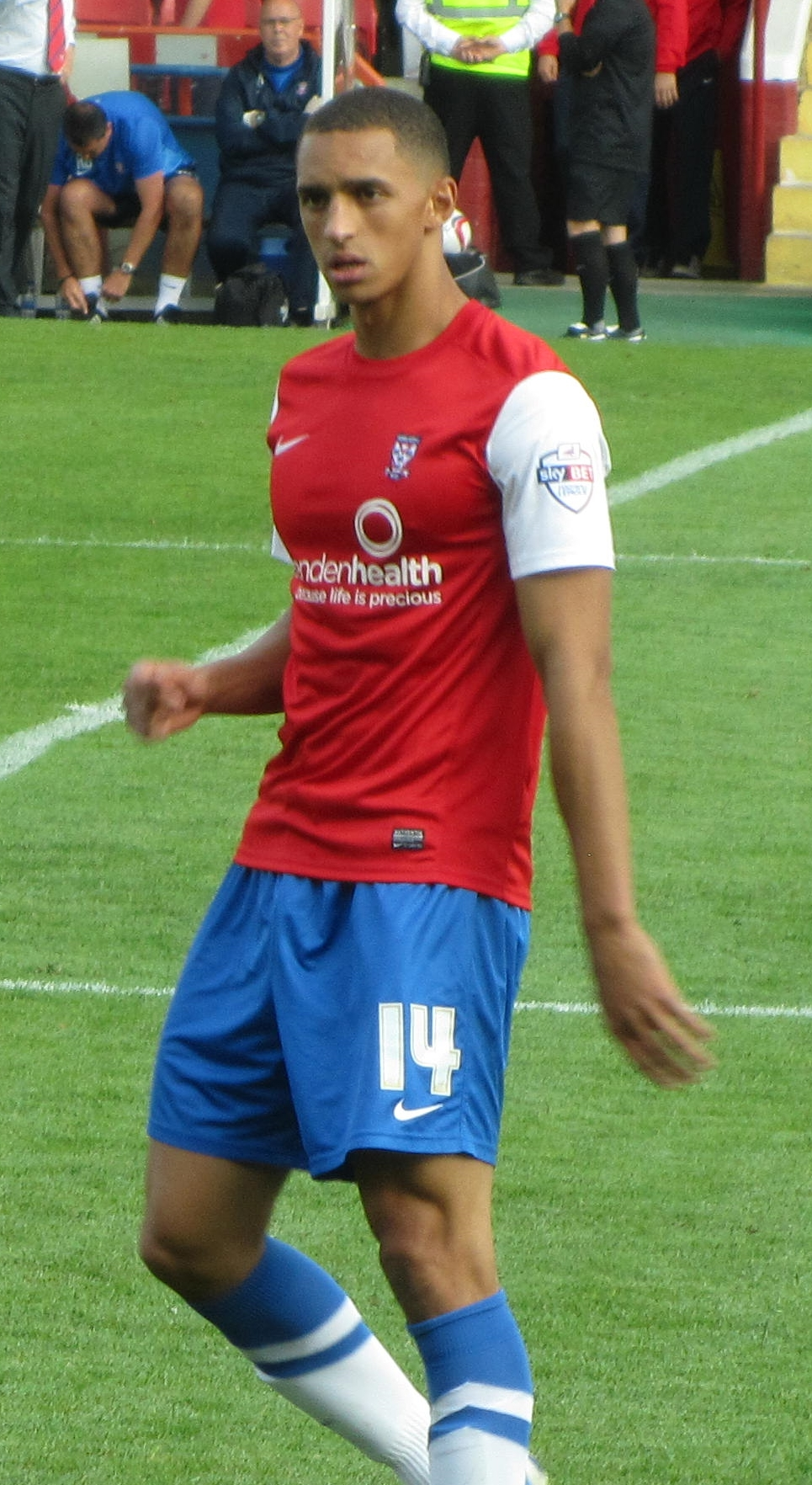
- Montrose playing for York City in 2013

Personal information
- Full name: Lewis Robert Egerton Montrose
- Date of birth: 17 November 1988 (age 37)
- Place of birth: Manchester, England
- Height: 6 ft 0 in (1.83 m)
- Position: Central midfielder

Youth career
- Manchester City
- –2006: Wigan Athletic

Senior career*
Years	Team	Apps	(Gls)
2006–2009	Wigan Athletic	0	(0)
2008	→ Rochdale (loan)	0	(0)
2008	→ Cheltenham Town (loan)	4	(0)
2009	→ Cheltenham Town (loan)	1	(0)
2009	→ Chesterfield (loan)	12	(0)
2009–2011	Wycombe Wanderers	50	(4)
2011–2013	Gillingham	52	(5)
2013	→ Oxford United (loan)	5	(0)
2013–2015	York City	47	(1)
2015–2017	Stockport County	74	(1)
2017–2020	AFC Fylde	62	(4)
2020–22	Kidderminster Harriers	17	(1)
- * Club domestic league appearances and goals as of 00:54, 17 May 2022 (BST)

Lewis Robert Egerton Montrose (born 17 November 1988) is an English professional footballer who plays as a central midfielder. He last played for National League club Kidderminster Harriers. He has played in the English Football League for Cheltenham Town, Chesterfield, Wycombe Wanderers, Gillingham, Oxford United and York City.

== Career ==
Montrose was born in Manchester, Greater Manchester. He started his career with Manchester City's youth system before joining Wigan Athletic in their youth system. He made his Wigan Athletic debut, as a substitute, in a 2–0 League Cup defeat against Crewe Alexandra on 19 September 2006. He signed a professional contract with Wigan on 5 July 2007.

On 27 March 2008, he was loaned out to League Two club Rochdale, although injury ended his spell at the club before he made a single competitive appearance.

On 24 September 2008, Montrose was loaned out to League One club Cheltenham Town on a one-month deal. Montrose scored his first goal for Cheltenham in their first round FA Cup replay victory away to Oldham Athletic on 18 November 2008. Only a couple of months later, on 6 January 2009, Montrose returned to Cheltenham on another one-month loan. On 26 February 2009, Montrose joined League Two club Chesterfield for the remainder of the 2008–09 season.

On 25 June 2009, Montrose was signed on a free transfer by Wycombe Wanderers of League One on a two-year contract. Wycombe were relegated to League Two in 2009–10, in which he made 15 appearances. He was released on 11 May 2011 having made 40 appearances and scored four goals in 2010–11, after Wycombe won promotion back to League One by finishing in third place in League Two.

He joined League Two club Gillingham on 1 July 2011, and made a goalscoring debut in the 1–0 win over Cheltenham Town on 6 August 2011. He also scored the winning goal for Gillingham in their 1–0 home win over Oxford United on 22 October 2011, but was sent off in the same match in the 88th minute for a dangerous tackle on Asa Hall.

In January 2013, he joined League Two rivals Oxford on loan until the end of 2012–13. Montrose made his debut in a 2–1 away win at Bradford City on 12 January 2013, before finishing the loan with five appearances for Oxford. Prior to this loan he had made 18 appearances for Gillingham, as they went on to win the League Two title.

Montrose signed for League Two club York City on a two-year contract on 28 June 2013. He made his debut as a 67th-minute substitute for Tom Platt in a 4–0 home defeat to Burnley in the first round of the League Cup on 6 August 2013. He was released by the club in May 2015.

Montrose signed for National League North club Stockport County on 23 July 2015.

On 30 May 2017, Montrose joined newly promoted National League club AFC Fylde on a two-year contract, with the option of a third year.

In July 2020, Montrose joined National League North side Kidderminster Harriers on a one-year deal. His deal was extended by another year at the end of the 2020-21 season, before he was released by Kidderminster following the 2021-22 season.

== Career statistics ==
As of match played 7 March 2020

Appearances and goals by club, season and competition
Club	Season	League			FA Cup		League Cup		Other		Total	
Club	Season	Division	Apps	Goals	Apps	Goals	Apps	Goals	Apps	Goals	Apps	Goals
Wigan Athletic	2006–07	Premier League	0	0	0	0	1	0	—		1	0
Wigan Athletic	2007–08	Premier League	0	0	0	0	0	0	—		0	0
Wigan Athletic	2008–09	Premier League	0	0	0	0	1	0	—		1	0
Wigan Athletic	Total		0	0	0	0	2	0	—		2	0
Rochdale (loan)	2007–08	League Two	0	0	—		—		—		0	0
Cheltenham Town (loan)	2008–09	League One	5	0	2	1	—		1 (Note: Appearance in Football League Trophy)	0	8	1
Chesterfield (loan)	2008–09	League Two	12	0	—		—		—		12	0
Wycombe Wanderers	2009–10	League One	14	0	0	0	0	0	1	0	15	0
Wycombe Wanderers	2010–11	League Two	36	4	2	0	1	0	1	0	40	4
Wycombe Wanderers	Total		50	4	2	0	1	0	2	0	55	4
Gillingham	2011–12	League Two	37	4	4	0	1	0	1	0	43	4
Gillingham	2012–13	League Two	15	1	1	0	1	0	1	1	18	2
Gillingham	Total		52	5	5	0	2	0	2	1	61	6
Oxford United (loan)	2012–13	League Two	5	0	—		—		—		5	0
York City	2013–14	League Two	33	1	1	0	1	0	2 (Note: One appearance in Football League Trophy, one in League Two play-offs)	0	37	1
York City	2014–15	League Two	14	0	2	0	0	0	1	0	17	0
York City	Total		47	1	3	0	1	0	3	0	54	1
Stockport County	2015–16	National League North	32	0	1	0	—		0	0	33	0
Stockport County	2016–17	National League North	42	1	4	0	—		4 (Note: Appearances in FA Trophy)	0	50	1
Stockport County	Total		74	1	5	0	—		4	0	83	1
AFC Fylde	2017–18	National League	44	3	3	0	—		1 (Note: Appearance in National League play-offs)	0	48	3
AFC Fylde	2018–19	National League	5	0	0	0	—		2	0	7	0
AFC Fylde	2019–20	National League	13	1	1	0	—		4	0	18	1
AFC Fylde	Total		62	4	4	0	—		7	0	73	4
Career total			307	15	21	1	6	0	19	1	353	17

== Honours ==
Wycombe Wanderers

- Football League Two third-place promotion: 2010–11

Gillingham

- Football League Two: 2012–13
