= Paulo Gazzaniga =

Argentine footballer (born 1992)

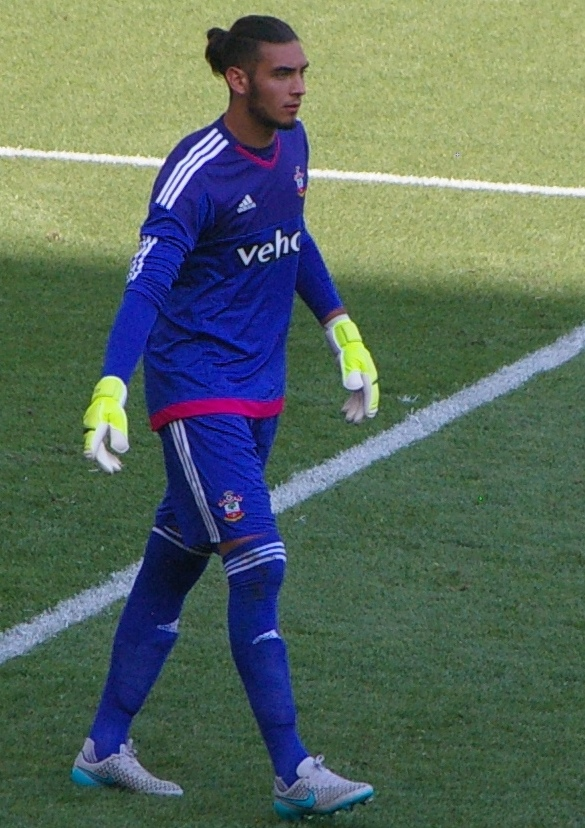
- Gazzaniga playing for Southampton in 2015

Personal information
- Full name: Paulo Dino Gazzaniga Farías
- Date of birth: 2 January 1992 (age 34)
- Place of birth: Murphy, Argentina
- Height: 1.96 m (6 ft 5 in)
- Position: Goalkeeper

Team information
- Current team: Girona
- Number: 13

Youth career
- Unión y Cultura
- 2007–2011: Valencia

Senior career*
Years	Team	Apps	(Gls)
2011–2012	Gillingham	20	(0)
2012–2017	Southampton	21	(0)
2016–2017	→ Rayo Vallecano (loan)	32	(0)
2017–2021	Tottenham Hotspur	22	(0)
2021	→ Elche (loan)	8	(0)
2021–2023	Fulham	13	(0)
2022–2023	→ Girona (loan)	28	(0)
2023–	Girona	120	(0)

International career
2018	Argentina	1	(0)
- * Club domestic league appearances and goals as of 24 October 2026

Paulo Dino Gazzaniga Farías (born 2 January 1992) is an Argentine professional footballer who plays as a goalkeeper for Segunda División club Girona.

== Early life ==
Gazzaniga was born in Murphy, Santa Fe, the same small town in Argentina where his future Southampton and Tottenham manager Mauricio Pochettino was also born. His father is Daniel Gazzaniga, a footballer, as is his brother Gianfranco who also plays as a goalkeeper. Gazzaniga studied in the only public school and a secondary college in Murphy. He played for the football team of Centro Recreativo Unión y Cultura in Murphy as a goalkeeper.

== Club career ==
=== Early career ===
In 2007, when he was 15, Gazzaniga left his hometown side Unión y Cultura with his brother and father for Spain, where he joined the Spanish club Valencia's youth setup. However, he failed to make a first team appearance for the club, and was subsequently released in May 2011.

In July 2011, Gazzaniga signed a two-year contract with League Two club Gillingham, to challenge Ross Flitney for the number one spot. Gazzaniga was recommended to Gillingham manager Andy Hessenthaler by Gary Penrice, Wigan Athletic's European scout, following his release from Valencia. He made his professional debut for the club on 4 October, in a 3–1 home defeat to Barnet in the Football League Trophy.

=== Southampton ===
On 20 July 2012, Gazzaniga signed a four-year deal with newly promoted Premier League side Southampton, with Tommy Forecast going to Gillingham on loan as part of the deal. He described it as "a crazy situation" but said it was like "a dream".

Gazzaniga made his debut on 28 August in a 4–1 victory against Stevenage in the second round of the League Cup. He made his league debut almost a month later, on 22 September in a 4–1 win against Aston Villa.

Gazzaniga was used as cover for first choice keepers Kelvin Davis, Artur Boruc and Fraser Forster, making only two appearances in 2014–15.

He made two Premier League appearances in the 2015–16 season, in the 1–0 defeat away to Crystal Palace and a home 2–0 defeat to Tottenham Hotspur, both in December 2015. He signed a new four-year deal with Southampton on 11 September 2015.

On 29 July 2016, Gazzaniga joined Segunda División club Rayo Vallecano on loan for the 2016–17 season.

=== Tottenham Hotspur ===
On 23 August 2017, Gazzaniga signed for fellow Premier League club Tottenham Hotspur on a five-year contract. He reunited with his compatriot and former Southampton manager, Mauricio Pochettino. He made his Premier League debut for the club on 5 November 2017, playing in a 1–0 victory against Crystal Palace. Pochettino said that Gazzaniga performed "fantastically well" on his debut.

In 2018–19 after starting for Tottenham in the Premier League against Brighton & Hove Albion and Huddersfield Town, in the EFL Cup against Watford and West Ham United and in the UEFA Champions League home fixture against PSV, he earned his first Argentina national team call-up. He became effectively the number two goalkeeper for Tottenham this season, having started in more games than Michel Vorm when Hugo Lloris was not available.

In the 2019–20 season, following Lloris' elbow injury in the opening ten minutes of a loss at Brighton & Hove Albion on 5 October 2019, Gazzaniga enjoyed an extended run as Spurs' first-choice goalkeeper.

On 1 February 2021, Gazzaniga joined Spanish side Elche on loan for the remainder of the 2020–21 season.

On 27 May 2021, Tottenham announced the departure of Gazzaniga at the end of the campaign following the conclusion of his contract.

=== Fulham ===
On 24 July 2021, Gazzaniga joined EFL Championship club Fulham on a two-year contract. A backup to Marek Rodák during his first year, he was pushed to third choice keeper with the arrival of Bernd Leno in August 2022. He was released by the London club at the conclusion of 2022–23 season.

=== Girona ===
On 1 September 2022, Gazzaniga joined Girona on loan for the 2022–23 season. On 6 June 2023, he signed a permanent two-year contract with the club. On 14 February 2024, he extended his contract with the club until 2027. In the 2023–24 season, he played in all 38 La Liga matches, achieving twelve clean sheets, which helped his club secure third place in the league and their first-ever qualification for the UEFA Champions League.

On 18 September 2024, during the club's inaugural European match, he conceded an own goal in the 90th minute, leading to a 1–0 away defeat against Paris Saint-Germain. However, just a few weeks later on 6 October, he managed to save three penalty kicks, including a retaken one, in a 2–1 victory over Athletic Bilbao.

== International career ==
Gazzaniga's first senior Argentina call-up was on 9 November 2018, when Lionel Scaloni added him to the squad for two friendlies against Mexico in November 2018. He made his first international appearance on 20 November 2018, coming off the bench to replace Gerónimo Rulli in the 59th minute of a friendly match against Mexico, and helped keep a clean sheet in a 2–0 win for Argentina.

== Career statistics ==
=== Club ===
As of match played 24 October 2026

Appearances and goals by club, season and competition
Club	Season	League			National cup (Note: Includes FA Cup, Copa del Rey)		League cup (Note: Includes Football League/EFL Cup)		Europe		Other		Total	
Club	Season	Division	Apps	Goals	Apps	Goals	Apps	Goals	Apps	Goals	Apps	Goals	Apps	Goals
Gillingham	2011–12	League Two	20	0	1	0	0	0	—		1 (Note: Appearance in Football League Trophy)	0	22	0
Southampton	2012–13	Premier League	9	0	0	0	2	0	—		—		11	0
Southampton	2013–14	Premier League	8	0	0	0	0	0	—		—		8	0
Southampton	2014–15	Premier League	2	0	0	0	0	0	—		—		2	0
Southampton	2015–16	Premier League	2	0	0	0	0	0	—		—		2	0
Southampton	2017–18	Premier League	0	0	—		—		—		—		0	0
Southampton	Total		21	0	0	0	2	0	—		—		23	0
Rayo Vallecano (loan)	2016–17	Segunda División	32	0	2	0	—		—		—		34	0
Tottenham Hotspur	2017–18	Premier League	1	0	0	0	0	0	0	0	—		1	0
Tottenham Hotspur	2018–19	Premier League	3	0	2	0	5	0	1 (Note: Appearance(s) in UEFA Champions League)	0	—		11	0
Tottenham Hotspur	2019–20	Premier League	18	0	2	0	1	0	4	0	—		25	0
Tottenham Hotspur	2020–21	Premier League	0	0	0	0	0	0	0	0	—		0	0
Tottenham Hotspur	Total		22	0	4	0	6	0	5	0	—		37	0
Elche (loan)	2020–21	La Liga	8	0	—		—		—		—		8	0
Fulham	2021–22	Championship	13	0	2	0	0	0	—		—		15	0
Girona (loan)	2022–23	La Liga	28	0	—		—		—		—		28	0
Girona	2023–24	La Liga	38	0	0	0	—		—		—		38	0
Girona	2024–25	La Liga	36	0	0	0	—		7	0	—		43	0
Girona	2025–26	La Liga	35	0	1	0	—		—		—		36	0
Girona	2026–27	Segunda División	9	0	0	0	—		—		—		11	0
Girona	Girona total		148	0	1	0	—		7	0	—		156	0
Career total			253	0	10	0	8	0	12	0	1	0	284	0

=== International ===
As of match played 20 November 2018

Appearances and goals by national team and year
National team	Year	Apps	Goals
Argentina	2018	1	0
Total		1	0

== Honours ==
Southampton

- U21 Premier League Cup: 2014–15

Tottenham Hotspur

- UEFA Champions League runner-up: 2018–19

Fulham

- EFL Championship: 2021–22

Individual

- Gillingham Young Player of the Season: 2011–12
- La Liga Save of the Month: April 2026
