= Gianfranco Gazzaniga =

Argentine footballer (born 1993)

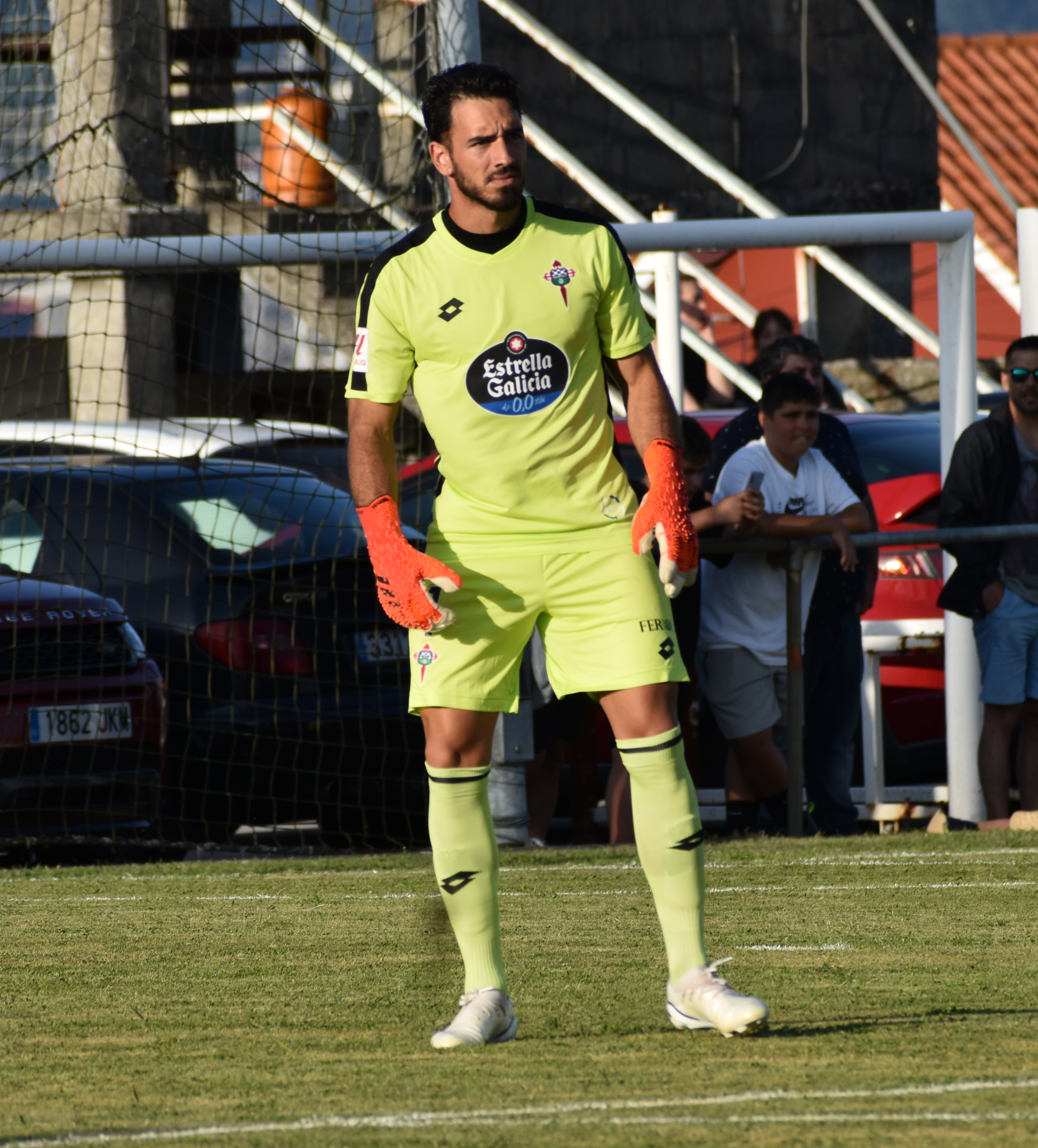
- Gazzaniga with Racing Ferrol in 2023

Personal information
- Full name: Gianfranco Gazzaniga Farías
- Date of birth: 22 November 1993 (age 32)
- Place of birth: Cuenca, Ecuador
- Height: 1.85 m (6 ft 1 in)
- Position: Goalkeeper

Team information
- Current team: Huesca

Youth career
- 2007–2011: Almería

Senior career*
Years	Team	Apps	(Gls)
2011–2017	Almería B	100	(0)
2017–2018	El Ejido	16	(0)
2018–2021	Ponferradina	23	(0)
2021–2024	Racing Ferrol	71	(0)
2024–2026	Murcia	70	(0)
2026–	Huesca	0	(0)
- * Club domestic league appearances and goals as of 23 May 2026

Gianfranco Gazzaniga Farías (born 22 November 1993) is an Argentine footballer who plays as a goalkeeper for Segunda División club Huesca.

== Club career ==
Born in Cuenca as his father was representing Deportivo Cuenca, Gazzaniga moved to Spain in 2007, joining UD Almería's youth setup. He made his senior debut with the reserves on 9 October 2011, starting in a 2–1 Segunda División B away win against CD Badajoz.

Gazzaniga subsequently became a regular starter for Almería's B-side before leaving the club on 21 June 2017 and signing for fellow third division side CD El Ejido. On 9 July of the following year, he moved to SD Ponferradina in the same category.

Gazzaniga contributed with 20 appearances during the 2018–19 season, as his side returned to Segunda División after three years. On 15 July 2019, he renewed his contract with Ponfe. Initially a third-choice behind José Antonio Caro and Manu García, he made his professional debut on 14 January 2020 by starting in a 0–1 away loss against Málaga CF.

On 15 June 2021, free agent Gazzaniga signed for Primera División RFEF side Racing de Ferrol. He was a first-choice as the club achieved promotion to the second division, but spent the 2023–24 season as a backup to Ander Cantero.

On 28 June 2024, Gazzaniga agreed to a deal with Real Murcia CF in the third division. On 9 June 2026, after two seasons as a starter, he moved to fellow league team SD Huesca.

== Personal life ==
Gazzaniga comes from a family of goalkeepers: his father Daniel played professionally in Argentina, Ecuador and Bolivia, while his older brother Paulo built his career in England before joining him in Spain.
