= Ross Flitney =

English footballer and coach

Personal information
- Full name: Ross Daniel Flitney
- Date of birth: 1 June 1984 (age 42)
- Place of birth: Hitchin, England
- Height: 6 ft 3 in (1.91 m)
- Position: Goalkeeper

Team information
- Current team: Wimborne Town (player and goalkeeping coach)

Youth career
- 1996–2000: Arsenal
- 2000–2003: Fulham

Senior career*
| Years | Team | Apps | (Gls) |
| 2003–2005 | Fulham | 0 | (0) |
| 2003 | → Brighton & Hove Albion (loan) | 1 | (0) |
| 2003–2004 | → Brighton & Hove Albion (loan) | 2 | (0) |
| 2005 | → Doncaster Rovers (loan) | 0 | (0) |
| 2005 | → Yeading (loan) | 7 | (0) |
| 2005–2007 | Barnet | 50 | (0) |
| 2007–2009 | Grays Athletic | 36 | (0) |
| 2008–2009 | → Croydon Athletic (loan) | 5 | (0) |
| 2009–2010 | Croydon Athletic | | |
| 2010–2011 | Dover Athletic | 55 | (0) |
| 2011–2013 | Gillingham | 27 | (0) |
| 2012 | → Eastleigh (loan) | 7 | (0) |
| 2013–2016 | Eastleigh | 144 | (0) |
| 2016–2017 | Whitehawk | 7 | (0) |
| 2017 | Bromley | 14 | (0) |
| 2017–2023 | Eastleigh | 25 | (0) |
| 2023– | Wimborne Town | 0 | (0) |
- * Club domestic league appearances and goals as of 17:26, 21 June 2023 (UTC)

Ross Daniel Flitney (born 1 June 1984) is an English footballer who plays for Wimborne Town as a goalkeeper.

== Career ==
Born in Hitchin, Flitney started as a youth player at Arsenal before moving to Fulham in 2003 where he was cover for senior keepers such as Edwin van der Sar and Mark Crossley, but never made a first-team appearance despite making the bench on several occasions in the 2004–05 season. He did however have two loan spells with Brighton & Hove Albion and a further loan spell with Doncaster Rovers. In March 2005 he joined Isthmian League side Yeading on loan. He was released by Fulham in May 2005, joining Barnet the following month.

On 26 October 2005, he became the recipient of the quickest red card in the history of Old Trafford. In a League Cup match for Barnet against Manchester United, he was sent off for handling the ball outside his penalty area, only 80 seconds into the game. It was his first touch in the match, and Barnet went on to lose 4–1. The red card was later rescinded on appeal. During the 2005–06 season, he lost his place to Lee Harrison who had rejoined Barnet as a player-coach in the summer. He was told he could leave Barnet in November 2006, but was finally released at the end of the season, joining Grays Athletic in June 2007.

Flitney signed for Croydon Athletic on loan in December 2008, and just one month later he was transfer listed by Grays, with financial pressures and manager Wayne Burnett's plans being cited as the reason. A fortnight later, Flitney had his contract with the Essex side terminated by mutual consent, and signed a contract to stay with Croydon Athletic until the end of the season.

In January 2010, Flitney signed for Conference South club Dover Athletic. Dover manager Andy Hessenthaler said; "He's a keeper I've had my eye on. He brings something different to the table in that he is 6ft 3in and kicks the ball a mile!". Flitney made his debut for Dover in the 2–0 defeat to Woking on 23 January.

He was signed by Hessenthaler again, when he joined Gillingham in July 2011, and made his debut for Gillingham in the 1–0 win over Cheltenham Town on 6 August 2011.

In October 2012 he joined Eastleigh on an initial loan period of one month. After his loan at Eastleigh finished in January 2013, and his subsequent release by Gillingham, he rejoined Eastleigh on a permanent basis in February 2013. Flitney played the first nine games of the 2016–17 season for Eastleigh but then signed for Brighton-based National League South side Whitehawk, rejoining his former manager Richard Hill and making his debut in a 3–0 away win at Bishop's Stortford on 8 October. Flitney was sent off after the final whistle in the FA Cup first round against Stourbridge on 14 November for protesting to referee Robert Whitton, who had just blown for full-time with the ball in play, seconds before Javier Favarel scored a 30-yard volley which would have been the winning goal. On 14 January against Dulwich Hamlet in the FA Trophy second round, with his side leading 1–0, Flitney came off the bench to replace Hawks' injured keeper Tom Stewart in the 65th minute and went on to concede four times as well as give away and then save a penalty in the time remaining. Flitney left the Hawks at the end of January 2017, his last game being a 1–3 defeat at Hungerford Town on 23 January, a game in which he conceded a penalty after just four minutes. On 16 February 2017, Flitney joined Bromley on a short-term deal for the remainder of the campaign. Following 14 league appearances, in which he helped the club to a 10th-place finish, Flitney departed Bromley at the end of the season to eventually rejoin Eastleigh. On 20 June 2023, Flitney joined Wimborne Town.

== Career statistics ==
As of end of 2022–23 season

Appearances and goals by club, season and competition
| Club | Season | League | | | FA Cup | | League Cup | | Other | | Total | |
| Club | Season | Division | Apps | Goals | Apps | Goals | Apps | Goals | Apps | Goals | Apps | Goals |
|---|---|---|---|---|---|---|---|---|---|---|---|---|
| Brighton & Hove Albion (loans) | 2003–04 | Second Division | 1 | 0 | 0 | 0 | 0 | 0 | 0 | 0 | 1 | 0 |
| Brighton & Hove Albion (loans) | 2003–04 | Second Division | 2 | 0 | 0 | 0 | 0 | 0 | 0 | 0 | 2 | 0 |
| Doncaster Rovers | 2004–05 | League One | 0 | 0 | 0 | 0 | 0 | 0 | 0 | 0 | 0 | 0 |
| Barnet | 2005–06 | League Two | 35 | 0 | 1 | 0 | 2 | 0 | 0 | 0 | 38 | 0 |
| Barnet | 2006–07 | League Two | 15 | 0 | 1 | 0 | 2 | 0 | 2 (Note: Appearances in the Football League Trophy) | 0 | 20 | 0 |
| Barnet | Total | | 50 | 0 | 2 | 0 | 4 | 0 | 2 | 0 | 58 | 0 |
| Grays Athletic | 2007–08 | Conference Premier | 30 | 0 | 0 | 0 | — | | 0 | 0 | 30 | 0 |
| Grays Athletic | 2008–09 | Conference Premier | 6 | 0 | 0 | 0 | — | | 0 | 0 | 6 | 0 |
| Grays Athletic | Total | | 36 | 0 | 0 | 0 | 0 | 0 | 0 | 0 | 36 | 0 |
| Croydon Athletic (loan) | 2008–09 | Isthmian Division One South | | | | | — | | | | | |
| Croydon Athletic | 2009–10 | Isthmian Division One South | | | | | — | | | | | |
| Dover Athletic | 2009–10 | Conference South | 16 | 0 | 0 | 0 | — | | 2 (Note: Appearances in the Conference South play-offs) | 0 | 18 | 0 |
| Dover Athletic | 2010–11 | Conference South | 40 | 0 | 7 | 0 | — | | 1 (Note: Appearances in the FA Trophy) | 0 | 48 | 0 |
| Dover Athletic | Total | | 56 | 0 | 7 | 0 | 0 | 0 | 3 | 0 | 66 | 0 |
| Gillingham | 2011–12 | League Two | 27 | 0 | 3 | 0 | 1 | 0 | 0 | 0 | 31 | 0 |
| Eastleigh (loan) | 2012–13 | Conference South | 7 | 0 | 0 | 0 | — | | 1 | 0 | 8 | 0 |
| Eastleigh | 2012–13 | Conference South | 19 | 0 | 0 | 0 | — | | 2 (Note: Appearances in the Conference South play-offs) | 0 | 21 | 0 |
| Eastleigh | 2013–14 | Conference South | 40 | 0 | 2 | 0 | — | | 4 | 0 | 46 | 0 |
| Eastleigh | 2014–15 | Conference Premier | 46 | 0 | 3 | 0 | — | | 4 (Note: One appearance in the Hampshire Senior Cup, one in the FA Trophy and two in the Conference Premier play-offs) | 0 | 53 | 0 |
| Eastleigh | 2015–16 | National League | 30 | 0 | 5 | 0 | — | | 2 | 0 | 37 | 0 |
| Eastleigh | 2016–17 | National League | 9 | 0 | 0 | 0 | — | | 0 | 0 | 9 | 0 |
| Eastleigh | Total | | 144 | 0 | 10 | 0 | 0 | 0 | 12 | 0 | 166 | 0 |
| Whitehawk | 2016–17 | National League South | 7 | 0 | 2 | 0 | — | | 2 | 0 | 11 | 0 |
| Bromley | 2016–17 | National League | 14 | 0 | 0 | 0 | — | | 1 (Note: Appearance in the Kent Senior Cup) | 0 | 15 | 0 |
| Eastleigh | 2017–18 | National League | 20 | 0 | 1 | 0 | — | | 2 (Note: One appearance in the Hampshire Senior Cup, one in the FA Trophy) | 0 | 23 | 0 |
| Eastleigh | 2018–19 | National League | 3 | 0 | 1 | 0 | — | | 1 (Note: Appearance(s) in the Hampshire Senior Cup) | 0 | 5 | 0 |
| Eastleigh | 2019–20 | National League | 0 | 0 | 0 | 0 | — | | 6 (Note: Three appearances in the Hampshire Senior Cup, three in the FA Trophy) | 0 | 6 | 0 |
| Eastleigh | 2020–21 | National League | 0 | 0 | 0 | 0 | — | | 1 | 0 | 1 | 0 |
| Eastleigh | 2021–22 | National League | 2 | 0 | 0 | 0 | — | | 3 | 0 | 5 | 0 |
| Eastleigh | 2022–23 | National League | 0 | 0 | 0 | 0 | — | | 3 | 0 | 3 | 0 |
| Eastleigh | Total | | 25 | 0 | 2 | 0 | 0 | 0 | 16 | 0 | 43 | 0 |
| Career total | | | 369 | 0 | 26 | 0 | 5 | 0 | 37 | 0 | 437 | 0 |
