= Danny Jackman =

English footballer (born 1983)

Personal information
- Full name: Daniel James Jackman
- Date of birth: 3 January 1983 (age 43)
- Place of birth: Worcester, England
- Height: 5 ft 4 in (1.63 m)
- Position: Defender

Senior career*
| Years | Team | Apps | (Gls) |
| 2000–2003 | Aston Villa | 0 | (0) |
| 2002 | → Cambridge United (loan) | 7 | (1) |
| 2003 | → Stockport County (loan) | 6 | (0) |
| 2003–2005 | Stockport County | 54 | (4) |
| 2005–2007 | Gillingham | 73 | (1) |
| 2007–2009 | Northampton Town | 82 | (9) |
| 2009–2013 | Gillingham | 89 | (6) |
| 2013–2014 | Kidderminster Harriers | 51 | (2) |
| 2014–2017 | Worcester City | 91 | (0) |
| 2017–2018 | Redditch United | 17 | (0) |
| 2018 | Bromsgrove Sporting | 0 | (0) |
| Total | | 470 | (23) |

Managerial career
- 2017: Worcester City (player-assistant)
- 2017: Redditch United (player-coach)
- * Club domestic league appearances and goals

Daniel James Jackman (born 3 January 1983 in Worcester, Worcestershire) is an English former professional footballer, who last played for Bromsgrove Sporting.

== Career ==
=== Early career ===
Jackman started his career at Premier League side Aston Villa as a trainee, but never played for the first team. While with the Birmingham club he undertook two loan spells; the first at Cambridge United, the second at Stockport County. Young Jackman had clearly made an impression at Stockport as they snapped him up in the middle of his loan spell for a fee of £70,000 in the 2003–04 season. Over the next season and a half, Jackman made 54 league appearances (9 as a substitute) scoring 5 goals.

=== Gillingham ===
At the beginning of the 2005–06 season Jackman joined recently relegated League One side Gillingham. After a difficult start, during which the entire team struggled for results, Jackman found himself playing in the left wing position as well as the left back position. Following the departure of Tom Williams to Swansea City in January 2006, Jackman found himself reverting to his favoured left-back position and his performances improved towards the end of the season, leading to him finishing as the runner-up in the club's Player of the Year awards and being voted players' player of the year. He was awarded the "goal of the season" for 2006–07 for a goal at home to Brentford.

=== Northampton Town ===
He was offered a new contract with the Kent club but instead opted to sign for Northampton Town on 23 May 2007. After a fine first season with the club Jackman was voted the player of the year for the 2007–08 season. He signed a one-year contract extension with the club on 24 July 2008. Jackman has scored several goals in the 2008–09 season after being handed free-kick duties by Northampton manager Stuart Gray. He also won player of the year in his second season.

=== Return to Gillingham ===
Jackman rejoined Gillingham on 25 August 2009, making his first appearance as a substitute in a Football League Cup game against Blackburn Rovers the same day. Jackman went on to make 24 appearances on his return season, however he missed out nearly four months of football during the season with a dislocated shoulder. For the 2010–11 season, again Jackman suffered with injuries with this time suffering from a recurring knee injury. This limited his amount of game time to just 17 appearances in which he scored one goal. He was Gillingham's player of the season 2011–12 and signed a one-year contract extension with the Kent side in June 2012.

=== Kidderminster Harriers ===
On 28 January 2013, Jackman was said to be frustrated with the lack of first team action at Priestfield and opted to sign for Kidderminster Harriers of the Conference Premier. Jackman rejected two League clubs to sign for a club situated in his home county.

=== Worcester City ===
On 20 July 2014, Jackman signed a contract with Worcester City.

=== Redditch United ===
On 10 June 2017, Jackman signed for Southern League Premier Division Central side Redditch United in a player-coach role.

=== Bromsgrove Sporting ===
On 24 July 2018, Jackman signed for Bromsgrove Sporting.

== Honours ==
Cambridge United

- Football League Trophy runner-up: 2001–02

Individual

- Northampton Player of the Season: 2007–08, 2008–09
- Gillingham Player of the Season: 2011–12
