= 2019–20 National League =

National League
- Season: 2019–20

The 2019–20 National League season, known as the Vanarama National League for sponsorship reasons, was the fifth season under English football's new title of National League, the sixteenth season consisting of three divisions, and the forty-first season overall.

As a result of the COVID-19 pandemic, the National League season was initially suspended on 16 March 2020 until at least 3 April. On 31 March, this suspension was extended indefinitely until further notice. On 22 April, clubs voted to end the season, with promotions and relegations still "under careful consideration". Due to the knock-on effects of Bury F.C.'s expulsion from EFL League One at the start of the season, it had already been assumed prior to the pandemic that no more than one club instead of the usual two was to be relegated from the English Football League, and that no more than three clubs instead of the usual four were to be relegated from the National division. The cumulative effect that the early termination of the season and Bury's expulsion from the EFL had on the composition of the National League's three divisions would have been determined.

On 17 June 2020, Barrow along with Wealdstone and King's Lynn Town were elected champions of their respective divisions after National League clubs voted to decide the final tables on a points-per-game basis. Barrow were therefore promoted to League Two, with Wealdstone and King's Lynn Town promoted to the National League. AFC Fylde considered mounting a legal challenge with support from Ebbsfleet United against their relegations, but ultimately decided against it.

Promotion play-offs were held in all three divisions to decide the additional promotion places. The semi-finals took place over the final two weekends of July, and the finals took place on 1 and 2 August. Clubs were expected to conduct and fund a COVID-19 prevention and testing process, and were allowed to decline their place in the competition without penalty if they were unable to fulfil this requirement. On 1 July, the Premier League committed £200,000 to the National League to help fund the conclusion of their season.

== National League ==
National League
- Season: 2019–20
- Champions: Barrow
- Promoted: Barrow; Harrogate Town
- Relegated: Ebbsfleet United; AFC Fylde; Chorley

The National League consists of 24 clubs.

=== Team changes ===
==== To National League ====
Promoted from 2018–19 National League North

- Stockport County
- Chorley

Promoted from 2018–19 National League South

- Torquay United
- Woking

Relegated from 2018–19 League Two

- Yeovil Town
- Notts County

==== From National League ====
Promoted to 2019–20 League Two

- Leyton Orient
- Salford City

Relegated to 2019–20 National League North

- Gateshead

Relegated to 2019–20 National League South

- Maidstone United
- Braintree Town
- Havant & Waterlooville

=== Stadia and locations ===
Locations of the 2019–20 National League clubs (Greater London shown in more detail below)
Locations of the 2019–20 National League clubs (Greater London)

Team	Location	Stadium	Capacity
AFC Fylde	Wesham	Mill Farm Sports Village	6,000
Aldershot Town	Aldershot	Recreation Ground	7,200
Barnet	London (Canons Park)	The Hive Stadium	6,418
Barrow	Barrow-in-Furness	Holker Street	5,045
Boreham Wood	Borehamwood	Meadow Park	4,502
Bromley	London (Bromley)	Hayes Lane	5,300
Chesterfield	Chesterfield	Proact Stadium	10,504
Chorley	Chorley	Victory Park	4,100
Dagenham & Redbridge	London (Dagenham)	Victoria Road	6,078
Dover Athletic	Dover	Crabble Athletic Ground	5,745
Eastleigh	Eastleigh	Ten Acres	5,250
Ebbsfleet United	Northfleet	Stonebridge Road	4,800
FC Halifax Town	Halifax	The Shay	10,400
Harrogate Town	Harrogate	Wetherby Road	4,100
Hartlepool United	Hartlepool	Victoria Park	7,856
Maidenhead United	Maidenhead	York Road	4,000
Notts County	Nottingham	Meadow Lane	19,588
Solihull Moors	Solihull	Damson Park	5,500
Stockport County	Stockport	Edgeley Park	10,852
Sutton United	London (Sutton)	Gander Green Lane	5,013
Torquay United	Torquay	Plainmoor	6,500
Woking	Woking	Kingfield Stadium	6,036
Wrexham	Wrexham	Racecourse Ground	10,771
Yeovil Town	Yeovil	Huish Park	9,566

=== Personnel and sponsoring ===
Team	Manager^{1}	Captain	Kit manufacturer	Shirt sponsor
AFC Fylde	Jim Bentley	Lewis Montrose	Under Armour	VetPlus
Aldershot Town	Danny Searle	Dean Rance	Adidas	Bridges Estate Agents
Barnet	Darren Currie	Callum Reynolds	Jako	Canon
Barrow	David Dunn	Josh Granite	Joma	JF Hornby & Co.
Boreham Wood	Luke Garrard	Mark Ricketts	Puma	Barnet and Southgate College
Bromley	Neil Smith	Jack Holland	Macron	Southwark Metals
Chesterfield	John Pemberton	Jonathan Smith	Puma	Technique Learning Solutions
Chorley	Jamie Vermiglio	Andrew Teague	Macron	Cruise 118
Dagenham & Redbridge	Daryl McMahon	Kenny Clark	Nike	West & Coe
Dover Athletic	Andy Hessenthaler	Kevin Lokko	Jako	Exclusive Glazing
Eastleigh	Ben Strevens	Danny Hollands	LAB Sports	Utilita
Ebbsfleet United	Kevin Watson	Dave Winfield	Hummel	Kuflink
FC Halifax Town	Pete Wild	Matty Brown	Adidas	CORE Facility Services (Home); Halifax Bathrooms (Away); Stride Supplies (Third)
Harrogate Town	Simon Weaver	Josh Falkingham	Kappa	Strata
Hartlepool United	Dave Challinor	Ryan Donaldson	O'Neills	Utility Alliance Limited
Maidenhead United	Alan Devonshire	Alan Massey	Uhlsport	Utility Alliance Limited
Notts County	Neal Ardley	Michael Doyle	Puma	Vacant
Solihull Moors	James Shan	Kyle Storer	Surridge	John Shepherd Estate Agents
Stockport County	Jim Gannon	Paul Turnbull	Joma	Pioneer Group
Sutton United	Matt Gray	Jamie Collins	Macron	Angel Plastics
Torquay United	Gary Johnson	Asa Hall	Nike	No Sponsor
Woking	Alan Dowson	Josh Casey	Macron	Abstract Plans
Wrexham	Dean Keates	Shaun Pearson	Macron	Ifor Williams Trailers
Yeovil Town	Darren Sarll	Lee Collins	TAG	Jones Building Group

=== Managerial changes ===
Team	Outgoing manager	Manner of departure	Date of vacancy	Position in table	Incoming manager	Date of appointment
Yeovil Town	Neale Marmon	End of Interim Contract	4 May 2019	Pre-season	Darren Sarll	19 June 2019
FC Halifax Town	Jamie Fullarton	Resigned	15 July 2019	Pre-season	Pete Wild	25 July 2019
Wrexham	Bryan Hughes	Dismissed	25 September 2019	21st	Dean Keates	6 October 2019
Hartlepool United	Craig Hignett	Dismissed	10 October 2019	16th	Dave Challinor	11 November 2019
Ebbsfleet United	Garry Hill	Dismissed	10 October 2019	24th	Kevin Watson	4 November 2019
AFC Fylde	Dave Challinor	Dismissed	12 October 2019	21st	Jim Bentley	28 October 2019
Dagenham & Redbridge	Peter Taylor	Dismissed	29 December 2019	18th	Daryl McMahon	3 January 2020
Chesterfield	John Sheridan	Dismissed	2 January 2020	22nd	John Pemberton	2 January 2020
Solihull Moors	Tim Flowers	Mutual Consent	28 January 2020	9th	James Shan	12 February 2020
Barrow	Ian Evatt	Signed by Bolton Wanderers	1 July 2020	1st	David Dunn	9 July 2020

=== National League table ===
Pos	Team	Pld	W	D	L	GF	GA	GD	Pts	PPG	Promotion, qualification or relegation
1	Barrow (C, P)	37	21	7	9	68	39	+29	70	1.89	Promotion to EFL League Two
2	Harrogate Town (O, P)	37	19	9	9	61	44	+17	66	1.78	Qualification for the National League play-off semi-finals
3	Notts County	38	17	12	9	61	38	+23	63	1.66	Qualification for the National League play-off semi-finals
4	Yeovil Town	37	17	9	11	61	44	+17	60	1.62	Qualification for the National League play-off quarter-finals
5	Boreham Wood	37	16	12	9	55	40	+15	60	1.62	Qualification for the National League play-off quarter-finals
6	FC Halifax Town	37	17	7	13	50	49	+1	58	1.57	Qualification for the National League play-off quarter-finals
7	Barnet	35	14	12	9	52	42	+10	54	1.54	Qualification for the National League play-off quarter-finals
8	Stockport County	39	16	10	13	51	54	−3	58	1.49	
9	Solihull Moors	38	15	10	13	48	37	+11	55	1.45	
10	Woking	38	15	10	13	50	55	−5	55	1.45	
11	Dover Athletic	38	15	9	14	49	49	0	54	1.42	
12	Hartlepool United	39	14	13	12	56	50	+6	55	1.41	
13	Bromley	38	14	10	14	57	52	+5	52	1.37	
14	Torquay United	36	14	6	16	56	61	−5	48	1.33	
15	Sutton United	38	12	14	12	47	42	+5	50	1.32	
16	Eastleigh	37	11	13	13	43	55	−12	46	1.24	
17	Dagenham & Redbridge	37	11	11	15	40	44	−4	44	1.19	
18	Aldershot Town	39	12	10	17	43	55	−12	46	1.18	
19	Wrexham	37	11	10	16	46	49	−3	43	1.16	
20	Chesterfield	38	11	11	16	55	65	−10	44	1.16	
21	Maidenhead United	38	12	5	21	44	58	−14	41	1.08	Reprieved from relegation (Note: As a result of the knock-on effects of Bury's expulsion from League One, the fourth bottom team was reprieved from relegation for numerical reasons.)
22	Ebbsfleet United (R)	39	10	12	17	47	68	−21	42	1.08	Relegation to National League South
23	AFC Fylde (R)	37	9	12	16	44	60	−16	39	1.05	Relegation to National League North
24	Chorley (R)	38	4	14	20	31	65	−34	26	0.68	Relegation to National League North

Source: National League official site
Rules for classification: 1) Points; 2) Goal difference; 3) Number of goals scored; 4) Number of matches won; 5) Head-to-head results
(C) Champions; (O) Play-off winners; (P) Promoted; (R) Relegated

=== Play-offs ===
Quarter-finals
5	Boreham Wood	2
6	FC Halifax Town	1
4	Yeovil Town	0
7	Barnet	2

Semi-finals
2	Harrogate Town	1
5	Boreham Wood	0
3	Notts County	2
7	Barnet	0

Final
2	Harrogate Town	3
3	Notts County	1

==== Quarter-finals ====
17 July 2020	Boreham Wood	2–1	FC Halifax Town	Borehamwood
19:00	Smith 54'; Rhead 80'	Report	Sho-Silva 19'	Stadium: Meadow Park; Attendance: 0

18 July 2020	Yeovil Town	0–2	Barnet	Yeovil
15:00		Report	McCallum 53'; Vilhete 86'	Stadium: Huish Park; Attendance: 0

==== Semi-finals ====
25 July 2020	Harrogate Town	1–0	Boreham Wood	Harrogate
14:30	Muldoon 64'	Report		Stadium: Wetherby Road; Attendance: 0

25 July 2020	Notts County	2–0	Barnet	Nottingham
17:00	Dennis 37'; Roberts 59'	Report		Stadium: Meadow Lane; Attendance: 0

==== Final ====
2 August 2020
15:00

Harrogate Town	3–1	Notts County
Thomson 5'; Hall 28'; Diamond 70'	Report	Roberts 46'

Wembley Stadium, London
Attendance: 0 (Note: The final was played behind closed doors due to the COVID-19 pandemic in the United Kingdom.)
Referee: James Bell

=== Results table ===
Home \ Away	FYL	ALD	BRN	BRW	BOR	BRO	CHE	CHO	DAG	DOV	EAS	EBB	HAL	HAR	HAT	MDH	NOT	SOL	STO	SUT	TOR	WOK	WRE	YEO
AFC Fylde	—	1–0	0–4	0–1	1–2		1–3	0–0	3–0	0–0	3–1	1–0		0–0			1–2	0–0	1–2	0–0	2–3	1–4	3–2	
Aldershot Town	1–2	—	0–0	1–2	3–2	0–1	2–2	3–3	0–1	4–0	3–1		1–1	1–1	0–3	2–0	2–1		2–1	1–1			1–0	1–3
Barnet	2–1	2–0	—		2–2	1–2	2–2	2–1		0–1		5–2	1–1		2–1	1–0		0–0	1–2		2–2	2–2		1–0
Barrow	1–1	1–0	2–1	—	3–1	2–0		2–2	2–1	1–0	2–0	7–0	1–2	0–3	0–1	2–0	0–2	3–0		1–0	2–1			1–0
Boreham Wood	0–2	0–0	0–0	1–1	—		2–2			3–1	2–2	1–2		2–1	1–1	2–1	1–2	1–0	4–0	0–1		1–0	2–2	1–0
Bromley	2–2		1–2	1–2	1–0	—	2–1		3–0	3–0	2–3	3–1	5–0	3–3			2–1	2–2	2–2	0–1	3–3	1–0	0–2	1–1
Chesterfield	1–1	2–1		2–2		1–2	—	2–3	1–1	1–2	1–2	4–0	2–3	3–4	1–5		1–0	2–2		1–0	1–0	1–2	3–2	1–2
Chorley		0–0	0–1	1–3	1–3	0–0	1–2	—	1–0	1–1	1–2	0–4	0–1	0–2	0–0			1–6	3–0		1–0	1–1	0–2	1–2
Dagenham & Redbridge	1–2	6–1	1–1	0–2	0–3	1–1		0–0	—			1–1		4–2	3–1	1–2	2–0	2–0	1–1	1–2	0–0	0–2	2–1	3–2
Dover Athletic	5–1	2–0		2–1	0–2	3–0	1–1	1–1	1–2	—	3–1	1–1	0–2		1–1	3–4	2–2	1–1	0–1		1–2	1–2	2–1	0–1
Eastleigh	2–2	0–0	1–2		2–0	1–1	0–2	0–0	1–1		—	1–1		4–2	1–1	2–1	1–0			1–1	3–2	2–0	0–2	
Ebbsfleet United		1–2	3–0	0–3			2–2	1–0	1–1	0–1	1–1	—	1–4	0–2	2–2	1–2	2–2		0–1	1–1	2–4	2–1	2–1	1–3
FC Halifax Town	4–1		4–2	0–2		2–1	1–0	0–0	1–0	4–2	1–1	0–1	—	0–1	2–0	5–2	2–4	2–1	0–0	1–0	2–4	0–2		0–2
Harrogate Town		1–0	2–1		0–0	1–1	3–1	2–0		0–2	3–0	2–0	2–2	—	4–1	1–0	0–2	2–2	2–1	2–0	2–1		0–2	3–0
Hartlepool United	2–2	2–0	2–0	2–2		2–3	3–1		1–0	0–2	2–1	0–1		0–1	—		2–0		2–0	1–3		1–1	4–2	2–1
Maidenhead United	1–1	1–2	1–4	0–4	0–1	1–2	1–1	4–1	0–1	1–2	2–0	1–3	0–1	1–1	0–1	—	0–0	1–0	1–2			2–3	2–0	
Notts County	2–0	3–1	1–2	0–3	2–2	2–1	3–0	5–1	2–0	0–0	4–0		1–0		2–2	3–0	—	0–0	1–1	1–1	2–0	1–1	1–1	
Solihull Moors	3–1	2–1	1–0	0–0	0–2	2–1	3–0		2–1	3–0	1–2	2–1			0–1	0–2	0–1	—	2–0	2–0	3–0		3–1	0–1
Stockport County	2–1	1–2	1–1	3–2	1–3	1–0	2–0	4–2	1–0	0–2	2–0	1–1	5–1		2–1	0–1		1–4	—	0–0	0–4	1–3		
Sutton United			1–1	2–2		0–2	4–0	2–2	0–2	1–2		2–3	0–1	3–1	1–1	0–3	1–1	0–0	0–0	—	2–0	6–2	3–1	3–2
Torquay United	2–1	2–0		4–2	2–1		0–3	2–0	0–0		2–3	0–0	1–0	4–2	1–2	0–2			1–5	1–2	—	4–1	1–0	0–2
Woking		0–1	1–3	3–2	1–2	2–1		1–0			1–1	2–2	0–0	1–0	2–1	2–0	0–4	2–0	1–1	0–2	1–1	—	1–1	1–0
Wrexham	0–1	1–2	1–1	2–1		1–0	0–1	3–1	0–0		0–0	1–0	1–0	1–1		2–2		2–0	1–2	1–1		3–0	—	3–3
Yeovil Town	3–2	2–2			1–1	3–1		1–1		0–1	1–0		2–0	1–2	2–2	1–2	3–1	0–0	1–1	1–0	6–2	3–1	3–0	—

Source: National League Results Grid
Legend: Blue = home team win; Yellow = draw; Red = away team win.
For upcoming matches, an "a" indicates there is an article about the rivalry between the two participants.

=== Top scorers ===
As of matches played 7 March 2020

Rank	Player	Club	Goals
1	(England) Scott Quigley	Barrow	20
2	(Northern Ireland) Jamie Reid	Torquay United	18
2	(England) Kabongo Tshimanga	Boreham Wood	18
4	(Republic of Ireland) Rhys Murphy	Yeovil Town	17
4	(England) John Rooney	Barrow	17
6	(England) Inih Effiong	Dover Athletic	16
6	(England) Jake Hyde	Woking	16
8	(Nigeria) Simeon Akinola	Barnet	15
8	(England) Harry Beautyman	Sutton United	15
10	(England) Tyrone Marsh	Boreham Wood	14

=== Monthly awards ===
Each month the Motorama National League announces their official Player of the Month and Manager of the Month.

Month	Player of the Month	Club	Manager of the Month	Club
August 2019	(England) Ben Gerring	Woking	(England) Alan Dowson	Woking
September 2019	(England) John Rooney	Barrow	(England) Darren Sarll	Yeovil Town
October 2019	(England) Matt Buse	Torquay United	(England) Simon Weaver	Harrogate Town
November 2019	(England) Jamey Osborne	Solihull Moors	(England) Ian Evatt	Barrow
December 2019	(Republic of Ireland) Courtney Duffus	Yeovil Town	(England) Neal Ardley	Notts County
January 2020	(England) Warren Burrell	Harrogate Town	(England) Pete Wild	FC Halifax Town
February 2020	(England) Asa Hall	Torquay United	(England) Simon Weaver	Harrogate Town

== National League North ==
National League North
- Season: 2019–20
- Champions: King's Lynn Town
- Promoted: King's Lynn Town; Altrincham
- Relegated: none

The National League North consists of 22 teams.

=== Team changes ===
==== To National League North ====
Promoted from 2018–19 Northern Premier League Premier Division

- Farsley Celtic

Promoted from 2018–19 Southern League Premier Division Central

- Kettering Town
- King's Lynn Town

Relegated from 2018–19 National League

- Gateshead

Transferred from 2018–19 National League South

- Gloucester City

==== From National League North ====
Promoted to 2019–20 National League

- Stockport County
- Chorley

Relegated to 2019–20 Northern Premier League Premier Division

- Ashton United
- F.C. United of Manchester

Relegated to 2019–20 Southern League Premier Division Central

- Nuneaton Borough

=== Stadia and locations ===
Locations of the 2019–20 National League North clubs

Team	Location	Stadium	Capacity
AFC Telford United	Telford	New Bucks Head	6,300
Alfreton Town	Alfreton	North Street	3,600
Altrincham	Altrincham	Moss Lane	6,085
Blyth Spartans	Blyth	Croft Park	4,435
Boston United	Boston	York Street	6,643
Brackley Town	Brackley	St. James Park	3,500
Bradford (Park Avenue)	Bradford	Horsfall Stadium	3,500
Chester	Chester	Deva Stadium	6,500
Curzon Ashton	Ashton-under-Lyne	Tameside Stadium	4,000
Darlington	Darlington	Blackwell Meadows	3,300
Farsley Celtic	Farsley	The Citadel	3,900
Gateshead	Gateshead	Gateshead International Stadium	11,800
Gloucester City	Evesham	Jubilee Stadium (groundshare with Evesham United)	3,000
Guiseley	Guiseley	Nethermoor Park	4,200
Hereford	Hereford	Edgar Street	5,213
Kettering Town	Kettering	Latimer Park (groundshare with Burton Park Wanderers)	2,400
Kidderminster Harriers	Kidderminster	Aggborough Stadium	6,238
King's Lynn Town	King's Lynn	The Walks	5,733
Leamington	Leamington	New Windmill Ground	2,300
Southport	Southport	Haig Avenue	3,150
Spennymoor Town	Spennymoor	The Brewery Field	6,000
York City	York	Bootham Crescent	8,256

=== National League North table ===
Pos	Team	Pld	W	D	L	GF	GA	GD	Pts	PPG	Promotion or qualification
1	King's Lynn Town (C, P)	32	19	7	6	63	39	+24	64	2.00	Promotion to National League
2	York City	34	19	9	6	52	28	+24	66	1.94	Qualification for the National League North play-off semi-finals
3	Boston United	32	17	7	8	46	32	+14	58	1.81	Qualification for the National League North play-off semi-finals
4	Brackley Town	34	16	12	6	61	25	+36	60	1.76	Qualification for the National League North play-off quarter-finals
5	Altrincham (O, P)	33	16	9	8	62	40	+22	57	1.73	Qualification for the National League North play-off quarter-finals
6	Chester	32	15	9	8	58	38	+20	54	1.69	Qualification for the National League North play-off quarter-finals
7	Gateshead	31	14	10	7	47	31	+16	52	1.68	Qualification for the National League North play-off quarter-finals
8	Spennymoor Town	34	15	10	9	63	45	+18	55	1.62	
9	Guiseley	33	14	8	11	52	41	+11	50	1.52	
10	Darlington	33	14	6	13	43	50	−7	48	1.45	
11	Farsley Celtic	34	14	6	14	50	45	+5	48	1.41	
12	Southport	32	12	7	13	40	41	−1	43	1.34	
13	Alfreton Town	32	12	4	16	48	55	−7	40	1.25	
14	AFC Telford United	34	11	9	14	51	56	−5	42	1.24	
15	Kidderminster Harriers	33	10	8	15	39	43	−4	38	1.15	
16	Hereford	35	9	12	14	39	56	−17	39	1.11	
17	Gloucester City	30	9	6	15	39	57	−18	33	1.10	
18	Leamington	32	9	8	15	39	51	−12	35	1.09	
19	Kettering Town	31	7	11	13	36	46	−10	32	1.03	
20	Curzon Ashton	33	8	10	15	34	42	−8	34	1.03	
21	Blyth Spartans	33	6	5	22	32	78	−46	23	0.70	Reprieved from relegation
22	Bradford (Park Avenue)	33	5	5	23	25	80	−55	20	0.61	Reprieved from relegation

Source: National League official site
Rules for classification: 1) Points; 2) Goal difference; 3) Number of goals scored; 4) Number of matches won; 5) Head-to-head results
(C) Champions; (O) Play-off winners; (P) Promoted

=== Play-offs ===
Quarter-finals
5	Altrincham	3
6	Chester	2
4	Brackley Town	1 (6)
7	Gateshead	1 (7)

Semi-finals
2	York City	0
5	Altrincham	2
3	Boston United	5
7	Gateshead	3

Final
3	Boston United	0
5	Altrincham	1

==== Quarter-finals ====
19 July 2020	Altrincham	3–2	Chester	Altrincham
13:30	Hancock 34'; Durrell 53' (pen.), 59'	Report	Glendon 63'; Hughes 80'	Stadium: The J. Davidson Stadium; Attendance: 0

19 July 2020	Brackley Town	1–1 (6–7 p)	Gateshead	Brackley
16:00	Byrne 45+6'	Report	Southern-Cooper 45+4'	Stadium: St James Park; Attendance: 0
	Penalties
	Byrne (penalty scored); Walker (penalty missed); Maye (penalty scored); Armson (penalty scored); Daire (penalty scored); Smith (penalty missed); Lowe (penalty scored); Myles (penalty missed)		(penalty scored) Pattison; (penalty missed) Deverdics; (penalty scored) Nicholson; (penalty scored) Olley; (penalty scored) Blackett; (penalty missed) Preston; (penalty scored) Southern-Cooper; (penalty scored) Forbes

==== Semi-finals ====
25 July 2020	York City	0–2	Altrincham	York
15:00		Report	Hancock 8'; Peers 77'	Stadium: Bootham Crescent; Attendance: 0

25 July 2020	Boston United	5–3	Gateshead	Boston
17:30	Thewlis 35' (pen.), 44' (pen.); Rollins 62'; Wright 71', 79'	Report	O'Donnell 20'; Nicholson 51' (pen.); Forbes 85'	Stadium: York Street; Attendance: 0

==== Final ====
1 August 2020
15:00

Boston United	0–1	Altrincham
		Mooney 64'

York Street, Boston
Attendance: 0

=== Results ===
Home \ Away	TEL	ALF	ALT	BLY	BOS	BRA	BRD	CHE	CUR	DAR	FAR	GAT	GLO	GUI	HER	KET	KID	KLT	LEA	SOU	SPE	YOR
AFC Telford United	—	3–0	2–2	4–2	1–3	0–1		1–3		1–2	0–2	0–0	4–3	4–1		3–1	2–0	1–3	1–3		2–2	1–1
Alfreton Town	1–1	—		3–0	1–1	2–4	4–0		3–2	1–2	2–4		6–1		2–0	0–2		2–2	1–0	2–0	0–2	1–3
Altrincham	5–2	3–2	—	3–1			2–0		2–1	1–1	3–1	3–0		1–1	5–1	1–1	1–1		5–0	3–0	4–1	1–3
Blyth Spartans	3–1		0–3	—	0–1	0–6		2–2	2–1	0–2	2–0	3–3	1–2	1–4	0–1		1–1	0–3		1–4		0–3
Boston United	1–0		5–0	2–0	—	1–0	2–1	1–1	0–0			0–3		1–1		2–1	2–0	0–3	1–0	2–0		3–1
Brackley Town	1–1	1–0	1–0	5–2	0–0	—	8–0	1–1	3–0	5–1	0–1		3–0	0–0		1–1	2–0	1–1		1–1	0–0	
Bradford (Park Avenue)	2–3		2–0	0–0	1–2	1–2	—	2–1	0–2		0–3		1–2	0–5	3–2		0–3	2–3	0–3	0–3	1–1	0–2
Chester	0–0	3–0	1–1	2–1		2–3	2–1	—	0–1	3–0	2–1		4–0	3–1	4–1			3–2	3–3	4–0		0–1
Curzon Ashton	2–1	0–2	0–1	0–1	1–1	0–4	5–0	1–3	—	3–1	4–0	0–1			2–0	0–0	0–1				1–1	1–0
Darlington	2–3	3–0		2–1	2–1	1–1	0–1	2–0		—	2–4	1–1	2–1	0–3	0–0	3–0	1–0			2–0	2–1	0–2
Farsley Celtic	1–1	1–1		2–0	2–4	1–1	5–0		2–1	3–1	—		1–1	0–1	1–2	3–2	0–1	1–2	2–1	0–3	1–0	
Gateshead		3–1	2–0	2–3	3–0	2–0	1–1	2–0	3–0		0–3	—	1–0	2–3	2–0		0–0	1–2	4–2	0–0	1–0	
Gloucester City	0–1		1–1		3–0		1–0		2–2	2–1			—	3–1	0–2	2–2			2–1	0–1	1–2	2–3
Guiseley	1–2	2–4	1–1			0–2		0–1	1–0	1–2	2–0	2–2	2–1	—	3–0	1–2	1–2	3–0	3–0		3–1	0–0
Hereford	1–0	1–2	0–2		0–0	1–1	1–1		1–1	2–2	1–1	2–1		0–0	—	1–0	2–1		1–2	2–2	2–2	2–2
Kettering Town	2–1	2–1	0–2	4–4	0–2		4–0	1–1	0–0		1–0	1–2	1–1		0–0	—	3–5				0–2	0–0
Kidderminster Harriers		0–1	2–0	0–1	1–3	1–3		0–1		1–1	2–0	1–1	2–3		3–1		—	2–4	2–2	0–1	1–1	0–1
King's Lynn Town		3–2	2–2	3–0	1–0		0–1	2–2	4–1	2–0		1–0	2–2	0–1	3–1	2–1	0–2	—	5–2		3–0	1–0
Leamington		0–1	0–1	2–0		2–0		0–0	1–1	3–0	0–3	0–0	3–0	2–2	0–2	3–1		0–0	—	1–0	2–2	
Southport	0–1		2–1	2–0	1–3	1–0	3–3	1–3	0–0				1–0	3–0	3–2	1–1	1–2	1–2	4–1	—		0–2
Spennymoor Town	3–3	5–0	3–2	5–0	2–1	0–0	3–0	2–1		3–1		1–3	5–1		4–0	1–2	2–1	2–2	2–0	1–0	—	1–4
York City	2–0	1–0			2–1	1–0	2–1	4–2	1–1	0–1	0–0	1–1		1–2	1–4	1–0	1–1	3–0	2–0	1–1		—

Updated to match(es) played on 14 March 2020. Source: National League North results grid
Legend: Blue = home team win; Yellow = draw; Red = away team win.

=== Managerial changes ===
Team	Outgoing manager	Manner of departure	Date of vacancy	Position in table	Incoming manager	Date of appointment
Gateshead	Ben Clark	Dismissed	30 April 2019	Pre-season	Dave Dickson	19 May 2019
Blyth Spartans	Alun Armstrong	Signed by Darlington	21 May 2019	Pre-season	Lee Clark	1 June 2019
Gateshead	Dave Dickson	Dismissed	31 May 2019	Pre-season	Mike Williamson	11 June 2019
Bradford (Park Avenue)	Garry Thompson	Dismissed	7 August 2019	24th	Marcus Law	8 August 2019
Hereford	Marc Richards	Dismissed	12 August 2019	13th	Russell Slade	29 August 2019
Kidderminster Harriers	John Pemberton	Resigned	27 November 2019	17th	Russell Penn	6 December 2019

=== Top scorers ===
As of matches played 14 March 2020

Rank	Player	Club	Goals
1	(England) Adam Marriott	King's Lynn Town	28
2	(Zimbabwe) Lee Ndlovu	Brackley Town	20
3	(Netherlands) Akwasi Asante	Chester	18
4	(England) Aaron Martin	Guiseley	17
4	(England) Glen Taylor	Spennymoor Town	17
6	(England) Josh March	Leamington	16
7	(England) Jordan Burrow	York City	15
7	(England) Adam Campbell	Darlington	15
7	(England) Amari Morgan-Smith	Alfreton Town	15
10	(England) Josh Hancock	Altrincham	14
10	(England) Jordan Hulme	Altrincham	14

=== Monthly Awards ===
Each month the Motorama National League announces their official Player of the Month and Manager of the Month.

Month	Player of the Month	Club	Manager of the Month	Club
August 2019	(England) Aaron Martin	Guiseley	(England) Steve Watson	York City
September 2019	(England) James Armson	Brackley Town	(England) Adam Lakeland	Farsley Celtic
October 2019	(Northern Ireland) David Morgan	Southport	(England) Alun Armstrong	Darlington
November 2019	(England) Adam Marriott	King's Lynn Town	(England) Ian Culverhouse	King's Lynn Town
December 2019	(Zimbabwe) Lee Ndlovu	Brackley Town	(England) Paul Holleran	Leamington
January 2020	(England) Josh Hancock	Altrincham	(England) Phil Parkinson	Altrincham

== National League South ==
National League South
- Season: 2019–20
- Champions: Wealdstone
- Promoted: Wealdstone; Weymouth
- Relegated: none

The National League South consists of 22 teams.

=== Team changes ===
==== To National League South ====
Promoted from 2018–19 Isthmian League Premier Division

- Dorking Wanderers
- Tonbridge Angels

Promoted from 2018–19 Southern League Premier Division South

- Weymouth

Relegated from 2018–19 National League

- Braintree Town
- Havant & Waterlooville
- Maidstone United

==== From National League South ====
Promoted to 2019–20 National League

- Torquay United
- Woking

Relegated to 2019–20 Isthmian League Premier Division

- East Thurrock United

Relegated to 2019–20 Southern League Premier Division South

- Truro City
- Weston-super-Mare

Transferred to 2019–20 National League North

- Gloucester City

=== Stadia and locations ===
Locations of the National League South 2019–20 clubs (Greater London shown in more detail below)

Locations of the 2019–20 National League South clubs (Greater London)

Team	Location	Stadium	Capacity
Bath City	Bath (Twerton)	Twerton Park	8,840
Billericay Town	Billericay	New Lodge	3,500
Braintree Town	Braintree	Cressing Road	4,085
Chelmsford City	Chelmsford	Melbourne Stadium	3,019
Chippenham Town	Chippenham	Hardenhuish Park	3,000
Concord Rangers	Canvey Island	Thames Road	3,300
Dartford	Dartford	Princes Park	4,100
Dorking Wanderers	Dorking	Meadowbank Stadium	2,000
Dulwich Hamlet	London (East Dulwich)	Champion Hill	3,000
Eastbourne Borough	Eastbourne	Priory Lane	4,151
Hampton & Richmond Borough	London (Hampton)	Beveree Stadium	3,500
Havant & Waterlooville	Havant	West Leigh Park	5,300
Hemel Hempstead Town	Hemel Hempstead	Vauxhall Road	3,152
Hungerford Town	Hungerford	Bulpit Lane	2,500
Maidstone United	Maidstone	Gallagher Stadium	4,200
Oxford City	Oxford (Marston)	Court Place Farm	2,000
Slough Town	Slough	Arbour Park	2,000
St Albans City	St Albans	Clarence Park	4,500
Tonbridge Angels	Tonbridge	Longmead Stadium	3,000
Wealdstone	London (Ruislip)	Grosvenor Vale	3,607
Welling United	London (Welling)	Park View Road	4,000
Weymouth	Weymouth	Bob Lucas Stadium	6,600

=== National League South table ===
Pos	Team	Pld	W	D	L	GF	GA	GD	Pts	PPG	Promotion or qualification
1	Wealdstone (C, P)	33	22	4	7	69	35	+34	70	2.12	Promotion to National League
2	Havant & Waterlooville	34	19	10	5	64	37	+27	67	1.97	Qualification for the National League South play-off semi-finals
3	Weymouth (O, P)	35	17	12	6	60	35	+25	63	1.80	Qualification for the National League South play-off semi-finals
4	Bath City	35	18	9	8	50	37	+13	63	1.80	Qualification for the National League South play-off quarter-finals
5	Slough Town	35	17	9	9	51	38	+13	60	1.71	Qualification for the National League South play-off quarter-finals
6	Dartford	34	16	8	10	60	46	+14	56	1.65	Qualification for the National League South play-off quarter-finals
7	Dorking Wanderers	35	14	8	13	58	56	+2	50	1.43	Qualification for the National League South play-off quarter-finals
8	Hampton & Richmond Borough	33	14	5	14	51	50	+1	47	1.42	
9	Maidstone United	33	12	9	12	48	44	+4	45	1.36	
10	Chelmsford City	34	11	11	12	55	56	−1	44	1.29	
11	Hemel Hempstead Town	34	12	8	14	36	43	−7	44	1.29	
12	Welling United	34	12	6	16	38	46	−8	42	1.24	
13	Oxford City	34	11	9	14	47	60	−13	42	1.24	
14	Chippenham Town	35	10	12	13	39	45	−6	42	1.20	
15	Tonbridge Angels	31	9	9	13	46	54	−8	36	1.16	
16	Concord Rangers	32	10	7	15	44	48	−4	37	1.16	
17	Billericay Town	32	8	13	11	46	55	−9	37	1.16	
18	Eastbourne Borough	33	8	14	11	38	54	−16	38	1.15	
19	Dulwich Hamlet	35	9	10	16	51	50	+1	37	1.06	
20	St Albans City	35	9	10	16	41	54	−13	37	1.06	
21	Braintree Town	35	10	5	20	44	67	−23	35	1.00	Reprieved from relegation
22	Hungerford Town	33	8	4	21	38	64	−26	28	0.85	Reprieved from relegation

Source: National League official site
Rules for classification: 1) Points; 2) Goal difference; 3) Number of goals scored; 4) Number of matches won; 5) Head-to-head results
(C) Champions; (O) Play-off winners; (P) Promoted

=== Play-offs ===
Quarter-finals
5	Slough Town	0
6	Dartford	3
4	Bath City	1
7	Dorking Wanderers	2

Semi-finals
2	Havant & Waterlooville	1
6	Dartford	2
3	Weymouth	3
7	Dorking Wanderers	2

Final
3	Weymouth	0 (3)
6	Dartford	0 (0)

==== Quarter-final ====
19 July 2020	Slough Town	0–3	Dartford	Slough
13:30		Report	Sheringham 47', 56'; Wanadio 85'	Stadium: Arbour Park; Attendance: 0

19 July 2020	Bath City	1–2	Dorking Wanderers	Bath
16:00	Brunt 80'	Report	McShane 6'; Prior 41'	Stadium: Twerton Park; Attendance: 0

==== Semi-finals ====
25 July 2020	Havant & Waterlooville	1–2	Dartford	Havant
15:00	Ayunga 14'	Report	McQueen 56', 65'	Stadium: West Leigh Park; Attendance: 0

25 July 2020	Weymouth	3–2	Dorking Wanderers	Weymouth
17:30	McQuoid 3' (pen.); Anthony 11'; Odubade 90+5'	Report	McShane 73'; Buchanan 85'	Stadium: Bob Lucas Stadium; Attendance: 0

==== Final ====
1 August 2020
15:00

Weymouth	0–0	Dartford
	Report
Penalties
Whelan (penalty scored); McCarthy (penalty scored); Anthony (penalty scored)	3–0	(penalty missed) Jebb; (penalty missed) McQueen; (penalty missed) Husin

Bob Lucas Stadium, Weymouth
Attendance: 0

=== Results table ===
Home \ Away	BAT	BIL	BRA	CHE	CHI	CON	DAR	DOR	DUL	EAB	HAM	H&W	HEM	HUN	MAI	OXF	SLO	STA	TON	WEA	WEL	WEY
Bath City	—	2–1	2–0		3–2	3–1	3–0	1–0	3–2	2–2	3–0		2–0	2–1	1–1	1–2		0–3	0–0	0–0		0–0
Billericay Town	1–1	—	2–1	1–1				2–2		1–0		0–1		3–0		1–1	2–2	3–2	3–3	3–1	2–1	1–1
Braintree Town	2–0	2–3	—	1–2		0–1		3–2	2–1	5–0	0–4	3–3	0–0	0–3	1–1	1–0	0–1	0–1	0–1	0–4		1–1
Chelmsford City	1–0	1–1	4–1	—	3–3	1–1	4–0	2–2	1–1	1–1	4–1		2–1	4–1		2–6	1–1			1–3	1–1	
Chippenham Town	1–3	2–0	1–2	2–1	—	3–0	1–5	0–2	2–2			0–0	2–2		1–0	1–1	0–3	2–1	2–1	1–1	0–0	1–0
Concord Rangers	0–1	4–1	2–2	2–1	0–1	—	0–2	3–3		5–0	0–2	0–0	3–1	0–2	0–1		2–1		3–3		3–0	
Dartford		3–2	2–1	3–0	1–1	0–1	—	3–4	1–0	2–1	1–2	1–1	1–1		2–2	3–0	2–3	1–1	3–0	0–0	4–0	
Dorking Wanderers	0–0		4–4	2–0	1–0		2–3	—	0–0	4–0	0–1	1–2	3–1	1–0	3–1	0–2	3–5		3–1	2–2	2–0	1–0
Dulwich Hamlet	1–3	0–1	6–0	5–3	1–1	2–2	1–1		—		1–2	1–3	2–1	2–3	0–1		2–3	2–1	0–1	1–0	0–1	2–2
Eastbourne Borough	1–2	1–1		0–4	2–1	2–2	0–2	3–2	0–3	—	4–1		1–1		3–0	1–1	0–2	3–3	2–0		2–1	1–1
Hampton & Richmond Borough	0–0	1–1			1–0	2–3	1–2		0–3		—	3–4	1–2	7–1	2–1	1–1	1–2	2–1	1–0	2–0	1–1	2–3
Havant & Waterlooville	2–1		1–3	0–0	2–1	2–1		6–0	0–0	0–0	2–0	—	1–2	3–1	1–2		1–0	1–2		2–4	1–1	
Hemel Hempstead Town	2–1	3–0	0–3	2–0	0–1	1–0		1–0	1–0	1–1		1–2	—	4–1			1–1	1–0	1–1	0–3	0–2	0–1
Hungerford Town	0–1		2–0	1–0	1–1		2–2	0–1	1–4	0–1	0–2	1–3		—	1–3	1–2	1–0	1–2	1–0		1–2	
Maidstone United	0–2	2–1	1–0	4–1	0–0			2–3	4–1	0–0	1–2	2–2	1–1		—	1–0	1–1	4–0	2–2		3–1	1–2
Oxford City		2–2	1–4		1–3	0–3	0–1	2–1	2–1		3–2	0–3	1–2	3–2	1–4	—	2–1	3–3	0–3	3–2		0–0
Slough Town	3–2	3–1	1–0	2–1			1–0	0–1		1–1	3–1	1–1	2–0	0–2		0–1	—	1–1	0–0	2–1	1–0	1–1
St Albans City	0–1		0–3	1–1	0–0	2–1	1–2	1–1		1–3	1–1	1–3	2–0	2–2	1–0	0–0		—		2–3	1–2	1–4
Tonbridge Angels		3–2	5–1	1–2	3–2	1–0	3–2		1–2			1–3	0–2	1–1		4–4		2–1	—			1–1
Wealdstone	7–0	3–0		0–1	1–0	3–0	4–1	3–1	2–1	2–0		1–4		3–1	2–1	1–0	2–1	1–0	3–1	—	1–0	
Welling United	0–3	2–0	6–2		1–0		0–3	2–1	0–0	0–0	0–1		2–0	3–2	1–0	3–1	1–2	0–1	4–2	1–2	—	1–3
Weymouth	1–1	0–0	3–0	4–1		3–0	3–1		1–1	2–2	2–1	0–1		2–1	5–1	2–1	2–0	0–1		3–4	1–0	—

Updated to match(es) played on 14 March 2020. Source: National League official site
Legend: Blue = home team win; Yellow = draw; Red = away team win.

=== Managerial changes ===
Team	Outgoing manager	Manner of departure	Date of vacancy	Position in table	Incoming manager	Date of appointment
Billericay Town	Harry Wheeler	Dismissed	16 September 2019	7th	Jamie O'Hara	16 September 2019
