= Matt Fish (footballer) =

English footballer

Personal information
- Full name: Matthew Fish
- Date of birth: 5 January 1989 (age 37)
- Place of birth: Croydon, England
- Position: Right back

Youth career
- 2005–2006: Crystal Palace

Senior career*
Years	Team	Apps	(Gls)
2006–2007	Crystal Palace	0	(0)
2007	→ AFC Wimbledon (loan)	0	(0)
2007–2011	Dover Athletic	135	(3)
2011–2015	Gillingham	72	(3)
2014	→ Portsmouth (loan)	3	(0)
2015–2016	Ebbsfleet United	52	(1)
2016–2017	Welling United	28	(0)
- * Club domestic league appearances and goals as of 01:26, 8 January 2017 (UTC)

Matthew Fish (born 5 January 1989) is an English footballer.

== Career ==
Fish progressed through the Crystal Palace youth ranks but was released in the summer of 2007 after a short loan spell at AFC Wimbledon. He made the switch to Isthmian League Division One side Dover Athletic in 2007 after a successful trial. He enjoyed a successful spell at Dover, winning two promotions in four seasons, and in the summer of 2011 made the move up to the Football League with Gillingham on a free transfer, linking up with former Dover manager Andy Hessenthaler. He made his professional debut on 9 August 2011, in the Football League Cup 1–0 defeat to Brighton & Hove Albion at the Falmer Stadium, coming on as a second-half substitute for Barry Fuller. On 21 November 2014 Fish joined League Two club Portsmouth on loan until 3 January 2015.

In January 2015 Fish left Gillingham and joined Ebbsfleet United of Conference South. On 4 October 2016, Fish was released by Ebbsfleet United of Conference South. He moved on to Welling United on 6 October 2016.

== Honours ==
Dover Athletic

- Isthmian League Division One South: 2007–08
- Isthmian League Premier Division: 2008–09

Gillingham

- Football League Two: 2012–13
