= Ashley Miller (footballer) =

English footballer

Personal information
- Full name: Ashley Jordan Miller
- Date of birth: 8 September 1994 (age 32)
- Place of birth: Dover, England
- Height: 5 ft 7 in (1.70 m)
- Position: Forward

Team information
- Current team: Deal Town

Senior career*
Years	Team	Apps	(Gls)
2010–2014	Gillingham	6	(1)
2012	→ Ramsgate (loan)		
2013	→ Hythe Town (loan)		
2013	→ Tonbridge Angels (loan)	4	(0)
2013	→ Hythe Town (loan)		
2013	→ Maidstone United (loan)		
2014	Maidstone United		
2014–2015	Hythe Town		
2015–2017	Folkestone Invicta	90	(13)
2016–2017	→ Ramsgate (loan)		
2017	Hythe Town		
2017–2019	Faversham Town	59	(14)
2019–2023	Ramsgate	103	(29)
2023–2024	Faversham Town	17	(3)
2024–	Deal Town	18	(5)
- * Club domestic league appearances and goals as of 17:20, 31 May 2024 (UTC)

Ashley Jordan Miller (born 8 September 1994) is a footballer who plays for Isthmian League South East Division club Deal Town.

== Career ==
Miller made his professional debut for Gillingham against Wycombe Wanderers on 2 November 2010, at the age of 16. Shortly afterwards, he was scouted and then linked with a move to various Premier League sides, most strongly Liverpool, however a move never materialised.

Miller made his first start for Gillingham on 7 March 2012 in a home game against Barnet, and scored his first senior goal in Gillingham's 4–3 defeat to Crewe Alexandra three days later. In October 2012, Miller signed on loan for Isthmian League Ramsgate, scoring the opening goal on his debut against Leatherhead in a 2–1 win. In February 2013, he signed on loan for Isthmian League Division One South side Hythe Town and scored twice on his debut before half time.

On 4 March 2014, Miller had his contract at Gillingham cancelled. He went on trial at Championship side Brentford in June 2014. He later signed for Maidstone United. prior to a move to Hythe Town on 29 September 2014. On 12 January 2015, Miller moved to divisional rivals Folkestone Invicta

On 31 May 2017, Miller rejoined Hythe for a nominal fee, despite being offered a new contract by Folkestone.

On 9 December 2017, Miller made his Faversham Town debut in a 2–2 draw with Greenwich Borough after joining the Lilywhites from Hythe Town.

He re-joined Ramsgate in the summer of 2019, having scored 13 goals for Faversham during the 2018–19 season. He returned to Faversham for a third spell in May 2023 following their relegation to the Southern Counties East Premier Division.

In January 2024, Miller joined SCEFL Premier Division rivals Deal Town.
