= 2010–11 Gillingham F.C. season =

English football club season

Gillingham F.C.
2010–11 season
- Chairman: Paul Scally
- Manager: Andy Hessenthaler
- Football League Two: 8th
- FA Cup: 1st Round (eliminated by Dover Athletic)
- League Cup: 1st Round (eliminated by Norwich City)
- Football League Trophy: Southern Section; 1st Round (eliminated by Southend United)
- Top goalscorer: League: Cody McDonald (25); All: Cody McDonald (25)
- Highest home attendance: 7,475 vs. Dover Athletic, 6 November 2010
- Lowest home attendance: 4,076 vs. Wycombe Wanderers, 2 November 2010
- Average home league attendance: 5,231
Home colours	Away colours

This page shows the progress of Gillingham F.C. in the 2010–11 football season. This year they play their games in League Two in the English league system.

== Results ==
=== League Two ===
7 August 2010	Gillingham	1–1	Cheltenham Town	Priestfield Stadium
15:00	Akinfenwa 76'		Thomas 53'	Attendance: 5,655

14 August 2010	Hereford United	0–0	Gillingham	Edgar Street
15:00				Attendance: 2,915

21 August 2010	Gillingham	0–1	Lincoln City	Priestfield Stadium
15:00			Hughton 9'	Attendance: 4,838

28 August 2010	Morecambe	1–1	Gillingham	Globe Arena
15:00	Stanley 60'		Spiller 84'	Attendance: 2,325

4 September 2010	Bury	5–4	Gillingham	Gigg Lane
15:00	Bishop 15', 50'; Lowe 34' (pen.), 73'; Sodje 62'		Akinfenwa 47', 58'; Spiller 59'; Palmer 66'	Attendance: 2,700

11 September 2010	Gillingham	2–0	Shrewsbury Town	Priestfield Stadium
15:00	Palmer 12', 59' (pen.)			Attendance: 4,815

18 September 2010	Bradford City	1–0	Gillingham	Valley Parade
15:00	Williams 90'			Attendance: 10,722

25 September 2010	Gillingham	1–0	Burton Albion	Priestfield Stadium
15:00	McDonald 50'			Attendance: 4,823

28 September 2010	Gillingham	0–0	Southend United	Priestfield Stadium
19:45				Attendance: 4,925

2 October 2010	Accrington Stanley	7–4	Gillingham	Crown Ground
15:00	McConville 13'; Parkinson 34'; Barnett 43'; Edwards 58' (pen.), 62' (pen.); Gornell 73'; Ryan 90'		Bentley 29', 31'; McDonald 55'; Akinfenwa 79' (pen.)	Attendance: 1,933

9 October 2010	Gillingham	2–1	Stockport County	Priestfield Stadium
15:00	McDonald 3'; J. Payne 37'		Pulis 81'	Attendance: 4,755

16 October 2010	Port Vale	0–0	Gillingham	Vale Park
15:00				Attendance: 6,420

23 October 2010	Gillingham	1–1	Torquay United	Priestfield Stadium
15:00	McDonald 80'		Nicholson 90'; Mansell (red card) 90'	Attendance: 5,345

30 October 2010	Northampton Town	2–1	Gillingham	Sixfields Stadium
15:00	Beckwith 21'; McKenzie 40' (pen.)		Palmer 7'	Attendance: 4,573

2 November 2010	Gillingham	0–2	Wycombe Wanderers	Priestfield Stadium
19:45			Ainsworth 23'; Betsy 49'	Attendance: 4,076

13 November 2010	Gillingham	1–3	Crewe Alexandra	Priestfield Stadium
15:00	Whelpdale 47'; Davies (red card) 28'		Moore 36'; Donaldson 45'; Miller 77'	Attendance: 5,292

20 November 2010	Oxford United	0–1	Gillingham	Kassam Stadium
15:00			McDonald 40'	Attendance: 7,144

23 November 2010	Barnet	1–2	Gillingham	Underhill Stadium
19:45	Gallen 31'		Whelpdale 59'; Lee 65'	Attendance: 2,519

11 December 2010	Macclesfield Town	2–4	Gillingham	Moss Rose
15:00	Bencherif 7'; Barnett 71'		Whelpdale 9'; Gowling 12'; McDonald 19'; Akinfenwa 33'	Attendance: 1,507

28 December 2010	Gillingham	3–0	Port Vale	Priestfield Stadium
15:00	McDonald 1', 37'; Akinfenwa 60'			Attendance: 5,364

1 January 2011	Gillingham	1–0	Stevenage	Priestfield Stadium
15:00	Akinfenwa 38'			Attendance: 5,429

3 January 2011	Wycombe Wanderers	1–0	Gillingham	Adams Park
15:00	Winfield 64'			Attendance: 4,617

8 January 2011	Stockport County	1–5	Gillingham	Edgeley Park
15:00	Demontagnac 70'		McDonald 32', 56', 79'; Barcham 51'; Weston 71'	Attendance: 3,573

15 January 2011	Gillingham	1–0	Northampton Town	Priestfield Stadium
15:00	McDonald 32'			Attendance: 5,613

22 January 2011	Torquay United	1–1	Gillingham	Plainmoor
15:00	Benyon 7'		Rooney 87'	Attendance: 2,368

25 January 2011	Gillingham	0–2	Chesterfield	Priestfield Stadium
19:45			Smalley 13', 49'	Attendance: 4,770

29 January 2011	Gillingham	2–1	Aldershot Town	Priestfield Stadium
15:00	McDonald 53', 90'		Rodman 90'	Attendance: 4,810

1 February 2011	Stevenage	2–2	Gillingham	Broadhall Way
19:45	Harrison 25', 75'		McDonald 45'; Akinfenwa 50'	Attendance: 2,424

5 February 2011	Gillingham	0–0	Oxford United	Priestfield Stadium
15:00				Attendance: 5,364

8 February 2011	Gillingham	3–1	Rotherham United	Priestfield Stadium
19:45	McDonald 5', 36'; Oli 89'		Law 7'	Attendance: 4,824

12 February 2011	Crewe Alexandra	1–1	Gillingham	Alexandra Stadium
15:00	Sinclair 26' (o.g.)		Weston 54'	Attendance: 4,012

19 February 2011	Gillingham	1–1	Bury	Priestfield Stadium
15:00	Weston 25'		Lowe 72'	Attendance: 5,021

12 February 2011	Shrewsbury Town	0–0	Gillingham	Greenhous Meadow
15:00	Sharps (red card) 90'			Attendance: 5,574

1 March 2011	Aldershot Town	1–1	Gillingham	Recreation Ground
19:45	Hylton 77'		82' Nutter	Attendance: 2,038

5 March 2011	Gillingham	2–0	Bradford City	Priestfield Stadium
15:00	Akinfenwa 43'; Weston 46'			Attendance: 5,019

8 March 2011	Southend United	2–2	Gillingham	Roots Hall
19:45	Hall 15', 52'		McDonald 7'; Akinfenwa 18' (pen.)	Attendance: 5,771

12 March 2011	Gillingham	3–1	Accrington Stanley	Priestfield Stadium
15:00	Barcham 2', 45'; McDonald 56'		McConville 14'	Attendance: 5,299

19 March 2011	Burton Albion	1–1	Gillingham	Pirelli Stadium
15:00	Winnall 26'		McDonald 78'	Attendance: 3,230

27 March 2011	Cheltenham Town	1–2	Gillingham	Abbey Business Stadium
14:00	Elliott 3'		McDonald 86', 90'	Attendance: 3,157

2 April 2011	Gillingham	0–0	Hereford United	Priestfield Stadium
15:00				Attendance: 5,709

9 April 2011	Lincoln City	0–4	Gillingham	Sincil Bank
15:00			Gowling 20'; McDonald 41'; Hone (o.g.); Akinfenwa 69'	Attendance: 3,022

16 April 2011	Gillingham	1–1	Morecambe	Priestfield Stadium
15:00	McDonald 88'		Jevons 21' (pen.)	Attendance: 5,545

23 April 2011	Gillingham	2–4	Barnet	Priestfield Stadium
15:00	Barcham 28', 80'		Byrne 13'; McLeod 45+1', 52', 70' (pen.)	Attendance: 6,170

25 April 2011	Rotherham United	0–1	Gillingham	Don Valley Stadium
15:00			Barcham 79'	Attendance: 3,455

30 April 2011	Gillingham	2–4	Macclesfield Town	Priestfield Stadium
15:00	Jackman 43'; Martin 71'		Draper 3'; Daniel 7', 17'; Sinclair 48'	Attendance: 6,841

7 May 2011	Chesterfield	3–1	Gillingham	B2net Stadium
15:00	Whitaker 54'; Lester 76'; Smalley 82'		McDonald 67'	Attendance: 10,023

=== FA Cup ===
6 November 2010 Round 1	Gillingham	0–2	Dover Athletic	Priestfield Stadium
15:00	Nutter (red card) 70'		Birchall 18'; I'Anson 28'	Attendance: 7,475

=== League Cup ===
10 August 2010 Round 1	Norwich City	4–1	Gillingham	Carrow Road
19:45	C. Martin 26', 90'; Holt 32', 55'		Palmer 12'	Attendance: 13,068

=== Football League Trophy ===
31 August 2010	Southend United	0–0 (4–3 p)	Gillingham	Roots Hall
19:45				Attendance: 3,073
	Penalties
	Soares (penalty scored); Easton (penalty missed); Barker (penalty scored); Paterson (penalty scored); Grant (penalty missed); Sturrock (penalty scored)		S. Payne (penalty missed); McCammon (penalty scored); Nutter (penalty scored); Maher (penalty scored); Spiller (penalty missed); J. Payne (penalty missed)

== League data ==
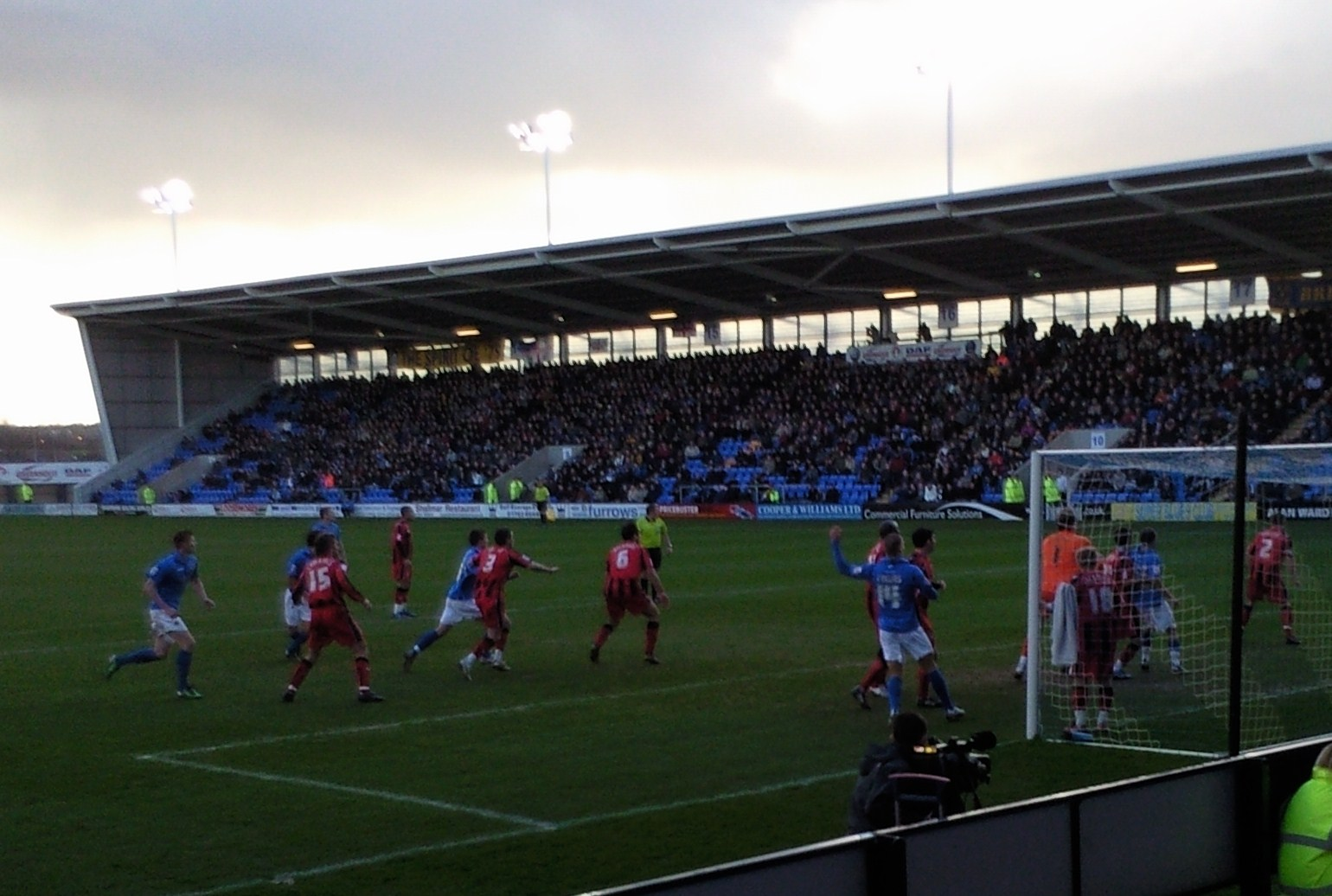
Action from the 0–0 draw away to Shrewsbury Town in February

=== League table ===
Pos	Team	Pld	W	D	L	GF	GA	GD	Pts	Promotion, qualification or relegation
6	Stevenage (O, P)	46	18	15	13	62	45	+17	69	Qualification to League Two play-offs
7	Torquay United	46	17	18	11	74	53	+21	68 (Note: Torquay United deducted one point and Hereford United deducted three points)	Qualification to League Two play-offs
8	Gillingham	46	17	17	12	67	57	+10	68	
9	Rotherham United	46	17	15	14	75	60	+15	66	
10	Crewe Alexandra	46	18	11	17	87	65	+22	65	

Updated to match(es) played on 28 May 2011. Source: The Football League
Rules for classification: 1) points; 2) goal difference; 3) number of goals scored.
(O) Play-off winners; (P) Promoted

=== Results summary ===
Overall								Home						Away					
Pld	W	D	L	GF	GA	GD	Pts	W	D	L	GF	GA	GD	W	D	L	GF	GA	GD
46	17	17	12	67	57	+10	68	10	7	6	29	24	+5	7	10	6	38	33	+5

Last updated: 11 May 2011.
Source: BBC Sport

== Appearances and goals ==
As of 6 May 2011.
(Substitute appearances in brackets)

No.	Pos.	Name	League		FA Cup		League Cup		League Trophy		Total		Discipline	
No.	Pos.	Name	Apps	Goals	Apps	Goals	Apps	Goals	Apps	Goals	Apps	Goals	Yellow card	Red card
1	GK	(Northern Ireland) Alan Julian	39	0	1	0	1	0	0	0	41	0	2	0
2	DF	(England) Barry Fuller	40 (2)	0	1	0	0	0	1	0	42 (2)	0	7	0
3	DF	(England) John Nutter	32 (2)	1	1	0	1	0	1	0	35 (2)	1	3	1
4	MF	(England) Curtis Weston	29 (4)	4	0	0	0	0	0	0	29 (4)	4	4	0
5	DF	(England) Simon King	3 (1)	0	0	0	0	0	0	0	3 (1)	0	0	0
6	DF	(England) Garry Richards	15 (2)	0	0	0	0	0	0	0	15 (2)	0	3	0
7	MF	(Republic of Ireland) Kevin Maher	36	0	0	0	0 (1)	0	1	0	37 (1)	0	5	0
8	MF	(England) Mark Bentley	15 (10)	2		0	1	0	0	0	16 (10)	2	4	1
9	FW	(Barbados) Mark McCammon	0 (5)	0	0	0	0	0	1	0	1 (5)	0	0	0
10	FW	(England) Cody McDonald	41	25	1	0	0	0	1	0	43	25	4	0
11	MF	(England) Andy Barcham	18 (6)	6	0	0	1	1	0 (1)	0	19 (7)	6	0	0
12	MF	(England) Chris Palmer	18	4	1	0	1	1	0	0	20	5	1	0
14	MF	(England) Luke Rooney	2 (21)	1	0	0	1	0	1	0	4 (21)	1	2	0
15	DF	(England) Matt Lawrence	41 (2)	0	1	0	0	0	0	0	42 (2)	0	11	0
16	DF	(England) Josh Gowling	21 (1)	2	0	0	1	0	1	0	23 (1)	2	1	0
17	MF	(England) Danny Spiller	23 (7)	2	1	0	1	0	1	0	26 (7)	2	6	0
18	MF	(England) Danny Jackman	15 (2)	1	0	0	0	0	0	0	15 (2)	1	2	0
19	MF	(France) Bruce Inkango	1 (4)	0	0 (1)	0	0	0	0	0	1 (5)	0	1	0
20	MF	(England) Nicky Southall	0	0	1	0	0	0	0	0	1	0	0	0
21	FW	(England) Dennis Oli	3 (18)	1	1	0	0	0	0	0	4 (18)	1	0	0
22	FW	(England) Andy White	0 (1)	0	0 (1)	0	0	0	0	0	0 (2)	0	0	0
23	FW	(England) Stefan Payne	1 (15)	0	0 (1)	0	0 (1)	0	0 (1)	0	1 (18)	0	0	0
26	GK	(England) Lance Cronin	7	0	0	0	0	0	1	0	8	0	0	0
27	FW	(England) Adebayo Akinfenwa	40 (4)	11	0 (1)	0	1	0	0	0	41 (5)	11	3	0
28	MF	(England) Jack Payne	25 (6)	1	1	0	1	0	1	0	28 (6)	1	3	0
29	DF	(England) Tony Sinclair	17 (3)	0	1	0	1	0	1	0	20 (3)	0	5	0
30	MF	(Belgium) Stanley Aborah	0 (1)	0	0	0	0	0	0	0	0 (1)	0	0	0
30	FW	(England) Ashley Miller	0 (1)	0	0	0	0	0	0	0	0 (1)	0	0	0
32	DF	(England) Callum Kennedy	3	0	0	0	0	0	0	0	3	0	0	0
32	DF	(England) Joe Martin	12 (5)	1	0	0	0	0	0	0	12 (5)	1	3	0
33	MF	(England) Charlie Lee	4	0	0	0	0	0	0	0	4	0	2	0
34	MF	(England) Chris Whelpdale	4	3	0	0	0	0	0	0	4	3	0	0
35	DF	(England) Callum Davies	1	0	0	0	0	0	0	0	1	0	0	1

== Awards ==
End of Season Awards	Winner
Supporters Player of the Season	Cody McDonald
Away Supporters Player of the Season	Cody McDonald
Automatic Retailing Player of the Season	Cody McDonald
Players' Player of the Season	Cody McDonald
Young Player of the Season	Jack Payne
Medways News Goal of the Season	Cody McDonald (vs Burton Albion, 19 March 2011)

== Transfers ==
Players transferred in
Date	Pos.	Name	From	Fee	Ref.
17 June 2010	FW	(England) Andy White	(England) Reading	Free	
17 June 2010	FW	(England) Stefan Payne	(England) Fulham	Free	
27 June 2010	MF	(England) Nicky Southall	(England) Dover Athletic	Free (player/coach)	
23 July 2010	DF	(England) Tony Sinclair	(England) Woking	Free	
23 July 2010	MF	(England) Danny Spiller	(England) Dagenham & Redbridge	Free	
26 July 2010	GK	(England) Lance Cronin	(England) Ebbsfleet United	Free	
29 July 2010	FW	(England) Adebayo Akinfenwa	(England) Northampton Town	Free (Bosman)	
5 August 2010	MF	(Belgium) Stanley Aborah	Free agent	Free	
12 August 2010	DF	(England) Matt Lawrence	(England) Crystal Palace	Free	
21 September 2010	MF	(France) Bruce Inkango	Free agent	Free	
21 September 2010	DF	(England) Joe Martin	(England) Blackpool	Free	
Players loaned in
Date from	Pos.	Name	From	Date to	Ref.
16 July 2010	FW	(England) Cody McDonald	(England) Norwich City	End of season	
9 November 2010	DF	(England) Callum Kennedy	(England) Swindon Town	9 December 2010	
11 November 2010	MF	(England) Charlie Lee	(England) Peterborough United	11 December 2010	
11 November 2010	MF	(England) Chris Whelpdale	(England) Peterborough United	11 December 2010	
Players loaned out
Date from	Pos.	Name	To	Date to	Ref.
22 October 2010	MF	(England) Luke Rooney	(England) Eastbourne Borough	22 November 2010	
27 October 2010	FW	(England) Andy White	(England) Margate	27 November 2010	
28 October 2010	DF	(England) Josh Gowling	(England) Lincoln City	28 November 2010	
29 October 2010	DF	(England) Connor Essam	(England) Bishops Stortford	29 November 2010	
10 January 2011	FW	(England) Andy White	(England) Bishops Stortford	10 February 2011	
10 January 2011	DF	(England) Connor Essam	(England) Bishops Stortford	10 February 2011	
17 February 2011	GK	(England) Darren Hawkes	(England) Ebbsfleet United	End of season	
18 February 2011	FW	(England) Stefan Payne	(England) Braintree Town	18 March 2011	
8 March 2011	MF	(England) Mark Bentley	(England) Cambridge United	9 April 2011	
21 March 2011	DF	(England) Connor Essam	(England) Dover Athletic	End of season	
Players transferred out
Date	Pos.	Name	Subsequent club	Fee	Ref.
15 July 2010	FW	(Canada) Simeon Jackson	(England) Norwich City	£600,000	
Players released
Date	Pos.	Name	Subsequent club	Join date	Ref.
2 June 2010	DF	(England) Tom Wynter	(England) Dover Athletic	1 July 2010	
3 June 2010	MF	(England) Stuart Lewis	(England) Dagenham & Redbridge	1 July 2010	
7 June 2010	FW	(England) Luis Cumbers	(England) Welling United	1 July 2010	
7 June 2010	FW	(England) Andy Pugh	(England) Welling United	1 July 2010	
7 June 2010	GK	(England) Simon Royce	(England) Brentford	7 June 2010 (Player/Goalkeeper Coach)	
23 June 2010	MF	(England) Adam Miller	(England) Cambridge United	1 July 2010	
1 July 2010	FW	(England) James Walker	(England) Leyton Orient	10 September 2010	
1 July 2010	FW	(England) Jacob Erskine	(England) Concord Rangers	?	
2 July 2010	MF	(England) Charlie Stimson	(England) Barnet	2 July 2010	
4 October 2010	MF	(Belgium) Stanley Aborah	Unattached		
20 December 2010	MF	(France) Bruce Inkango	(Albania) Kastrioti	18 February 2011	
