= 2009–10 Gillingham F.C. season =

English football club season

Gillingham
2009–10 season
- Chairman: Paul Scally
- Manager: Mark Stimson
- Football League One: 21st (relegated)
- FA Cup: Third round
- League Cup: Second round
- Football League Trophy: Second round
- Top goalscorer: League: Simeon Jackson (14); All: Simeon Jackson (17)
- Highest home attendance: 10,304 vs Charlton Athletic, 24 October 2009
- Lowest home attendance: 1,752 vs Colchester United, 1 September 2009
Home colours	Away colours

Gillingham return to League One for the 2009–10 season after being promoted from League Two the previous season.

== Season review ==
=== Kit ===
Vandanel continues as Gillingham's kit designer and KRBS.com stays as their main shirt sponsor.

=== Events ===
- 9 Sep 2009: Michael Anderson is appointed as director.
- 19 Nov 2009: Alan Julian is transfer listed.
- 14 Dec 2009: Simon Royce is injured in car crash and will be out for at least four weeks.

=== League ===
Gillingham began their League One campaign with a 5–0 win over Swindon Town, with Simeon Jackson getting the first League One hat-trick of the season. This was followed by a 4–2 loss against Tranmere Rovers and another two losses followed against Colchester United and Hartlepool United, moving the Gills into the relegation zone.

The Gills were held to a draw at Walsall, they then beat Exeter City and then a win over Millwall. Leeds United defeated Gillingham 4–1, followed closely by a draw against Norwich City and then another 4–1 loss to Southampton, conceding 9 and scoring only 3 in three games.

They bounced back quickly with a 3–2 win over Wycombe Wanderers. Two loses followed against Brighton & Hove Albion and MK Dons. The Gills then held another side, who was relegated for the Championship, Charlton Athletic, to a draw. Southend United then beat Gillingham 1–0.

The Gills continue their rollercoaster season with a 1–0 win over Oldham Athletic and then a loss to Bristol Rovers. Three days later Simeon Jackson put an early penalty away to beat Yeovil Town. Leyton Orient then beat Gillingham 3–1 and Carlisle United held the Gills to a goalless draws. Promotion chaser Huddersfield Town beat Gillingham 2–1. The nearly postponed game against Stockport County showed three stunning goals from Oli, on loan Brandy and Nutter, the second time the fans cleared out the snow it did not turn out so well as the Gills lost to Brentford, this was then followed by a scrappy draw against Exeter City.

Gillingham start the new year with a 3–1 loss to Swindon Town, followed by a goalless draw against Colchester United and then another draw against Hartlepool United. Walsall held Gillingham to a third consecutive draw. This undefeated streak ended with a 4–0 loss to Brentofrd and then a loss to Tranmere Rovers. A draw to Yeovil Town then followed, Bristol Rovers lost to Gillingham 1–0 but Leyton Orient held the Gills to a 1–1 draw. Carlisle United ended Gillingham's three-game unbeaten streak with a 2–0 win before quickly bouncing back and beating Huddersfield Town. Stockport County then drew with them, another draw with Charlton Athletic followed. MK Dons drew to Gillingham, to make the Gills third consecutive draw. Fellow relegation battlers Brighton & Hove Albion held Gillingham to a 1–1 draw. Gillingham beat an on form promotion hopefuls Leeds United.

Gillingham's four game unbeaten run was ended by fellow strugglers Oldham Athletic. Oli, Howe and Barcham gave Gillingham a 3–0 over Southend United. But losing the next game to Millwall.

Pos	Club	Pld	W	D	L	F	A	GD	Pts
20	Hartlepool United	46	14	11	21	59	67	-8	50*
21	Gillingham (R)	46	12	14	20	48	64	-16	50
22	Wycombe Wanderers (R)	46	10	15	21	56	76	−20	45

Pld = Matches played; W = Matches won; D = Matches drawn; L = Matches lost; F = Goals for; A = Goals against; GD = Goal difference; Pts = Points

==== Results summary ====
Overall								Home						Away					
Pld	W	D	L	GF	GA	GD	Pts	W	D	L	GF	GA	GD	W	D	L	GF	GA	GD
46	12	14	20	48	64	−16	50	12	8	3	35	15	+20	0	6	17	13	49	−36

Last updated: 17 Apr.

=== Cups ===
==== FA Cup ====
In the first round of the cup the Gills beat Southend United 3–0. Gillingham then beat League Two outfit, Burton Albion to go through to the third round. The Gills travels to Accrington Stanley for the fourth round. The third-round game was postponed due to heavy snow in Lancashire, meaning both clubs would be put in the draw for the 4th round. Gillingham were knocked out by Accrington after the third attempt of playing the game.

==== League Cup ====
Gillingham's first opponents in the Cup was Championship outfit Plymouth Argyle. The Gills beat the Pilgrims 2–1 to qualify for the next round. The second round Gillingham lost to Premier League side Blackburn Rovers.

==== Football League Trophy ====
Gillingham beat Colchester United in the first round. Then two weeks after playing Norwich City in the league, the Gills took them of in the FLT and were knocked out by the Canaries.

== Squad ==
Note: Flags indicate national team as defined under FIFA eligibility rules; some limited exceptions apply. Players may hold more than one non-FIFA nationality.

No.	Pos.	Nation	Player
1	GK	ENG	Simon Royce
2	DF	ENG	Barry Fuller (captain)
3	DF	ENG	John Nutter
4	MF	ENG	Stuart Lewis
5	DF	ENG	Simon King
6	DF	ENG	Garry Richards
7	MF	IRL	Kevin Maher
8	MF	ENG	Mark Bentley (vice-captain)
9	MF	ENG	Chris Palmer
10	FW	CAN	Simeon Jackson
11	FW	ENG	Andy Barcham
14	MF	NIR	Adam Miller
15	FW	GHA	Chris Dickson (on loan from Charlton Athletic)
16	DF	ENG	Josh Gowling
17	FW	ENG	Andy Pugh
18	MF	ENG	Danny Jackman

No.	Pos.	Nation	Player
19	FW	ENG	Jacob Erskine
21	FW	ENG	Dennis Oli
22	DF	ENG	Tom Wynter
23	GK	NIR	Alan Julian
24	MF	ENG	Rashid Yussuff
25	FW	ENG	Luis Cumbers
26	MF	ENG	Curtis Weston
27	MF	ENG	Luke Rooney
28	MF	ENG	Jack Payne
29	FW	ENG	Rene Howe (on loan from Peterborough United)
30	FW	BRB	Mark McCammon (on loan to Bradford City)
31	DF	IRL	Darren Dennehy (on loan from Cardiff City)
34	FW	ENG	James Walker
—	FW	ENG	Tom Murphy

=== Statistics ===
Last Update 3 April 2010

No.	Pos	Nat	Player	Total		League Two		FA Cup		League Cup		Football League Trophy	
No.	Pos	Nat	Player	Apps	Goals	Apps	Goals	Apps	Goals	Apps	Goals	Apps	Goals
1	GK	(England) ENG	Simon Royce	21	0	17	0	2	0	2	0	0	0
2	DF	(England) ENG	Barry Fuller	42	0	36	0	3	0	2	0	1	0
3	DF	(England) ENG	John Nutter	38	1	32	1	3	0	2	0	1	0
4	MF	(England) ENG	Stuart Lewis	25	1	21	1	3	0	0	0	1	0
5	DF	(England) ENG	Simon King	0	0	0	0	0	0	0	0	0	0
6	DF	(England) ENG	Garry Richards	18	0	15	0	0	0	1	0	2	0
7	MF	(Republic of Ireland) IRL	Kevin Maher	31	0	26	0	2	0	2	0	1	0
8	MF	(England) ENG	Mark Bentley	37	2	32	2	3	0	1	0	1	0
9	MF	(England) ENG	Chris Palmer	27	1	20	1	3	0	2	0	2	0
10	FW	(Canada) CAN	Simeon Jackson	45	17	39	14	3	0	2	2	1	1
11	FW	(England) ENG	Andy Barcham	46	8	39	7	3	0	2	1	2	0
12	GK	(England) ENG	Simon Locke*	0	0	0	0	0	0	0	0	0	0
14	MF	(Northern Ireland) NIR	Adam Miller	26	4	23	4	0	0	1	0	2	0
15	FW	(England) ENG	Scott Vernon*	1	0	1	0	0	0	0	0	0	0
15	FW	(Ghana) GHA	Chris Dickson	7	1	7	1	0	0	0	0	0	0
16	DF	(England) ENG	Josh Gowling	34	1	28	1	3	0	2	0	1	0
17	FW	(England) ENG	Andy Pugh	0	0	0	0	0	0	0	0	0	0
18	MF	(England) ENG	Danny Jackman	23	0	21	0	0	0	1	0	1	0
19	FW	(England) ENG	Jacob Erskine	6	0	4	0	0	0	0	0	2	0
20	DF	(England) ENG	Matt Fry*	13	0	11	0	2	0	0	0	0	0
21	FW	(England) ENG	Dennis Oli	36	3	33	3	2	0	1	0	0	0
22	DF	(England) ENG	Tom Wynter	9	0	8	0	1	0	0	0	0	0
23	GK	(Northern Ireland) NIR	Alan Julian	29	0	26	0	1	0	0	0	2	0
24	MF	(England) ENG	Rashid Yussuff	9	0	8	0	0	0	0	0	1	0
25	FW	(England) ENG	Luis Cumbers	2	0	2	0	0	0	0	0	0	0
26	MF	(England) ENG	Curtis Weston	43	8	36	6	3	2	2	0	2	0
27	MF	(England) ENG	Luke Rooney	15	2	12	2	0	0	1	0	2	0
28	MF	(England) ENG	Jack Payne	17	0	15	0	0	0	1	0	1	0
29	FW	(England) ENG	Febian Brandy*	8	2	6	1	2	1	0	0	0	0
29	FW	(England) ENG	Rene Howe	15	1	15	1	0	0	0	0	0	0
30	FW	(Barbados) BRB	Mark McCammon	21	0	14	0	3	0	2	0	2	0
31	DF	(Republic of Ireland) IRL	Darren Dennehy	17	0	17	0	0	0	0	0	0	0
32	FW	(England) ENG	Tristan Plummer	2	0	2	0	0	0	0	0	0	0
34	FW	(England) ENG	James Walker	4	0	4	0	0	0	0	0	0	0
—	FW	(England) ENG	Tom Murphy	0	0	0	0	0	0	0	0	0	0

- *Indicates player left during the season

== Transfers ==
=== Summer transfers in ===
Player	Club	Fee
Jacob Erskine	Bromley	Free
Josh Gowling	Carlisle United	Undisclosed
Danny Jackman	Northampton Town	Undisclosed
Kevin Maher	Oldham Athletic	Free
Chris Palmer	Walsall	Free
Rashid Yussuff	Charlton Athletic	Free

=== Summer transfers out ===
- * Indicates the player joined club after being released

Player	Club	Fee
Sean Clohessy	Salisbury City*	Free
Andrew Crofts	Brighton & Hove Albion*	Free
Albert Jarrett	Barnet	Free
Chris Kiely	Released	–
Gary Mulligan	Northampton Town	Free
Nicky Southall	Dover Athletic	Free
Tayler Thomas	Released	–

=== Loans in ===
Player	Club	Arrival Date	Return Date
Josh Gowling	Carlisle United	20 July	20 August
Matt Fry	West Ham United	15 October	20 January
Scott Vernon	Colchester United (Note: Player returned before return date.)	15 October	15 November
Febian Brandy	Manchester United	4 November	4 February
Simon Locke	Reading	16 December	16 January
Rene Howe	Peterborough United	20 January	End of Season
Darren Dennehy	Cardiff City	21 January	21 February
Tristan Plummer	Bristol City	21 January	21 February
Chris Dickson	Charlton Athletic	15 February	15 May

=== Loan out ===
Player	Club	Arrival Date	Return Date
Luis Cumbers	AFC Wimbledon	5 November	5 January
Jacob Erskine	Bromley	16 October	16 November
Adam Miller	Dagenham & Redbridge	10 November	10 January
Tom Wynter	Dover Athletic	16 November	16 December
Andy Pugh	Welling United	20 November	20 January

=== Winter Transfers in ===
Player	Club	Fee
James Walker	Unattached	Free

== Fixtures & results ==
=== League ===
Date	Opponent	Venue	Result	Attendance	Scorers
8 Aug	Swindon Town	H	5–0	6,852	Bentley, Jackson(3), Miller
15 Aug	Tranmere Rovers	A	2–4	5,590	Weston, Barcham
18 Aug	Colchester United	A	1–2	4,849	Weston
22 Aug	Hartlepool United	H	0–1	4,696	
29 Aug	Walsall	A	0–0	3,331	
5 Sep	Exeter City	H	3–0	5,107	Jackson(2), Rooney
12 Sep	Millwall	H	2–0	8,097	Barcham, Weston
19 Sep	Leeds United	A	1–4	21,026	Barcham
26 Sep	Norwich City	H	1–1	7,550	Jackson
3 Oct	Southampton	A	1–4	19,457	Rooney
10 Oct	Wycomber Wanderers	H	3–2	5,316	Gowling, Weston, Jackson
13 Oct	Brighton & Hove Albion	A	0–2	5,960	
17 Oct	Milton Keynes Dons	A	0–2	11,764	
24 Oct	Charlton Athletic	H	1–1	10,304	Jackson
30 Oct	Southend United	A	0–1	7,830	
14 Nov	Oldham Athletic	H	1–0	4,787	Weston
21 Nov	Bristol Rovers	A	1–2	6,210	Barcham
24 Nov	Yeovil Town	H	1–0	4,450	Jackson
1 Dec	Leyton Orient	A	1–3	3,183	Weston
5 Dec	Carlisle United	H	0–0	7,214	
12 Dec	Huddersfield Town	A	1–2	13,844	Jackson
19 Dec	Stockport County	H	3–1	4,769	Oli, Brandy, Nutter
26 Dec	Brentford	H	0–1	7,019	
28 Dec	Exeter City	A	1–1	5,761	Lewis
16 Jan	Swindon Town	A	1–3	6,773	Palmer
23 Jan	Colchester United	H	0–0	4,948	
26 Jan	Hartlepool United	A	1–1	2,465	Jackson
30 Jan	Walsall	H	0–0	4,769	
6 Feb	Brentford	A	0–4	6,036	
9 Feb	Tranmere Rovers	H	0–1	3,840	
13 Feb	Yeovil Town	A	0–0	3,853	
20 Feb	Bristol Rovers	H	1–0	5,302	Jackson
23 Feb	Leyton Orient	H	1–1	4,753	Dickson
27 Feb	Carlisle United	A	0–2	4,646	
6 Mar	Huddersfield Town	H	2–0	5,388	Jackson (2)
13 Mar	Stockport County	A	0–0	3,894	
20 Mar	Charlton Athletic	A	2–2		Barcham, Oli
27 Mar	Milton Keynes Dons	H	2–2	5,465	Miller, Barcham
3 Apr	Oldham Athletic	A	0–1	3,486	
5 Apr	Southend United	H	3–0	7,657	Oli, Howe, Barcham
10 Apr	Millwall	A	0–4	13,714	
13 Apr	Brighton & Hove Albion	H	1–1	7,977	Miller
17 Apr	Leeds United	H	3–2	9,649	Miller, Bentley, Naylor (OG)
24 Apr	Norwich City	A	0-2	25.227	
1 May	Southampton	H	2-1	9.504	Howe, Gowling
8 May	Wycombe Wanderers	A	0-3	7.110	

=== FA Cup ===
Date	Round	Opponent	Venue	Result	Attendance	Scorers
7 Nov	One	Southend United	H	3–0	4,605	Weston, Brandy, Bentley
28 Nov	Two	Burton Albion	H	1–0	4,996	Weston
19 Jan	Three	Accrington Stanley	A	0–1	1,322	

=== League Cup ===
Date	Round	Opponent	Venue	Result	Attendance	Scorers
11 Aug	One	Plymouth Argyle	H	2–1	3,306	Jackson, Barcham
25 Aug	Two	Blackburn Rovers	H	1–3	7,293	Jackson

=== Football League Trophy ===
Date	Round	Opponent	Venue	Result	Attendance	Scorers
1 Sep	One	Colchester United	H	1 – 1 4–3 (pens)	1,752	Jackson
6 Oct	Two	Norwich City	H	0–1	2,814	

== See also ==
- Gillingham F.C. seasons
