= 2007–08 Gillingham F.C. season =

English football club season

Gillingham
2007–08 season
- Manager: Ronnie Jepson (until 9 September); Mark Stimson (from 1 November)
- Stadium: Priestfield
- League One: 22nd (relegated)
- FA Cup: First round
- Football League Cup: First round
- Johnstones Paint Trophy: Southern Semi Final

This page shows the progress of Gillingham F.C. in the 2007–08 football season. During the season, Gillingham competed in League One in the English league system.

== League table ==
Pos	Team	Pld	W	D	L	GF	GA	GD	Pts	Promotion, qualification or relegation
20	Crewe Alexandra	46	12	14	20	47	65	−18	50	
21	AFC Bournemouth (R)	46	17	7	22	62	72	−10	48 (Note: Bournemouth deducted 10 points for entering administration.)	Relegation to Football League Two
22	Gillingham (R)	46	11	13	22	44	73	−29	46	Relegation to Football League Two
23	Port Vale (R)	46	9	11	26	47	81	−34	38	Relegation to Football League Two
24	Luton Town (R)	46	11	10	25	43	63	−20	33 (Note: Luton deducted 10 points each for entering administration.)	Relegation to Football League Two

Updated to match(es) played on unknown. Source: The Football League
Rules for classification: 1) points; 2) goal difference; 3) number of goals scored.
(R) Relegated

== Results ==
=== Football League One ===
11 August 2007 1	Cheltenham Town	1–0	Gillingham	Cheltenham
	Gillespie 24' (red card) 79'		Cox (red card) 57'; Lomas (red card) 76'	Stadium: Whaddon Road; Attendance: 4,008

18 August 2007 2	Gillingham	0–2	Tranmere Rovers	Gillingham
			Greenacre 19'; Davies 50'	Stadium: Priestfield; Attendance: 5,302

25 August 2007 3	Luton Town	3–1	Gillingham	Luton
	Bell 17'; Furlong 27'; Spring 80' (pen.)		Bentley 22'	Stadium: Kenilworth Road; Attendance: 6,178

1 September 2007 4	Gillingham	2–1	Walsall	Gillingham
	Mulligan 15', 34'		Fox 20'	Stadium: Priestfield; Attendance: 4,806

8 September 2007 5	Southend United	3–0	Gillingham	Southend-on-sea
	Bailey 8'; McCormack 44'; Clarke 59'			Stadium: Roots Hall; Attendance: 7,348

15 September 2007 6	Gillingham	1–0	Brighton & Hove Albion	Gillingham
	Facey 82'			Stadium: Priestfield; Attendance: 6,118

22 September 2007 7	Nottingham Forest	4–0	Gillingham	Nottingham
	Agogo 43', 61', 73'; Sinclair 84'			Stadium: City Ground; Attendance: 16,330

29 September 2007 8	Gillingham	1–1	Leeds United	Gillingham
	Cox 90'		Carole 28'; Kandol (red card) 41'; Beckford (red card) 57'	Stadium: Priestfield; Attendance: 8,719

2 October 2007 9	Gillingham	3–1	Leyton Orient	Gillingham
	Graham 25', 50'; Cogan 67'		Ibehre 72'	Stadium: Priestfield; Attendance: 5,632

6 October 2007 10	Swindon Town	5–0	Gillingham	Swindon
	McGovern 4'; Cox 6', 62'; Paynter 52', 84'			Stadium: County Ground; Attendance: 6,345

13 October 2007 11	Gillingham	1–1	Millwall	Gillingham
	Dickson 16'		Dunne 61'	Stadium: Priestfield; Attendance: 6,120

20 October 2007 12	Carlisle United	2–0	Gillingham	Carlisle
	Cox 15' (o.g.); Hackney 54'			Stadium: Brunton Park; Attendance: 6,461

27 October 2007 13	Gillingham	3–2	Bristol Rovers	Gillingham
	Brown 19'; Graham 85'; Dickson 89'		Lambert 27'; Pipe 46'	Stadium: Priestfield; Attendance: 5,333

2 November 2007 14	Swansea City	1–1	Gillingham	Swansea
	Feeney (red card) 23'; Anderson 79'		Facey 10'	Stadium: Liberty Stadium; Attendance: 13,452

6 November 2007 15	Gillingham	1–1	Doncaster Rovers	Gillingham
	Dickson 16'		Hayter 65' (pen.)	Stadium: Priestfield; Attendance: 5,030

18 November 2007 16	Yeovil Town	2–1	Gillingham	Yeovil
	Owusu 66'; Walker 88'		Dickson 76'	Stadium: Huish Park; Attendance: 4,408

24 November 2007 17	Gillingham	2–1	Hartlepool United	Gillingham
	Oli 46', 59'		Brown 25'	Stadium: Priestfield; Attendance: 5,488

4 December 2007 18	Crewe Alexandra	2–3	Gillingham	Crewe
	Moore 43'; Roberts 49'		Bentley 8'; Dickson 56' (pen.), 73'	Stadium: Gresty Road; Attendance: 3,929

8 December 2007 19	Gillingham	1–2	Port Vale	Gillingham
	Dickson 32'		Willock 34'; King 45' (o.g.)	Stadium: Priestfield; Attendance: 7,001

15 December 2007 20	Bournemouth	1–0	Gillingham	Bournemouth
	Pitman 34'			Stadium: Fitness First Stadium; Attendance: 4,746

26 December 2007 21	Gillingham	1–1	Southend United	Gillingham
	Miller 82'; Thurgood (red card) 89'		Clarke 54'	Stadium: Priestfield; Attendance: 8,268

29 December 2007 22	Gillingham	3–0	Nottingham Forest	Gillingham
	Mulligan 49'; Miller 61'; Griffiths 81'		Clarke 54'	Stadium: Priestfield; Attendance: 7,712

1 January 2008 23	Leyton Orient	0–0	Gillingham	London
				Stadium: Matchroom Stadium; Attendance: 5,369

12 January 2008 24	Huddersfield Town	1–3	Gillingham	Huddersfield
	Brandon 32'		Mulligan 45', 75' (pen.); Facey 82'	Stadium: Galpharm Stadium; Attendance: 11,212

19 January 2008 25	Gillingham	0–1	Northampton Town	Gillingham
			Jones 3'	Stadium: Priestfield; Attendance: 5,579

22 January 2008 26	Gillingham	0–0	Oldham Athletic	Gillingham
	Royce (red card) 38'			Stadium: Priestfield; Attendance: 4,402

26 January 2008 27	Walsall	2–1	Gillingham	Walsall
	Mooney 28'; Sonko 72'		Crofts 90'	Stadium: Banks's Stadium; Attendance: 4,914

29 January 2008 28	Tranmere Rovers	2–0	Gillingham	Birkenhead
	McLaren 7'; Zola 14'			Stadium: Prenton Park; Attendance: 5,006

2 February 2008 29	Gillingham	0–0	Cheltenham Town	Gillingham
				Stadium: Priestfield; Attendance: 4,993

9 February 2008 30	Oldham Athletic	2–1	Gillingham	Oldham
	Taylor 42'; Davies 67'		Oli 25'	Stadium: Boundary Park; Attendance: 4,866

16 February 2008 31	Northampton Town	4–0	Gillingham	Northampton
	Crowe 44'; Akinfenwa 45', 53'; Coke 64'			Stadium: Sixfields; Attendance: 4,978

23 February 2008 32	Gillingham	1–0	Huddersfield Town	Gillingham
	Miller 88' (pen.)			Stadium: Priestfield; Attendance: 5,022

1 March 2008 33	Gillingham	0–0	Yeovil Town	Gillingham
			Maher (red card) 78'	Stadium: Priestfield; Attendance: 5,083

4 March 2008 34	Brighton & Hove Albion	4–2	Gillingham	Brighton
	Forster 23' (pen.); El-Abd 43'; Elphick 45'; Robinson 68'		Crofts 4', 76'; Richards (red card) 20'; Clohessy (red card) 82'	Stadium: Withdean Stadium; Attendance: 6,836

8 March 2008 35	Hartlepool United	4–0	Gillingham	Hartlepool
	Monkhouse 21'; Porter 26'; Collins 74'; McCunnie 90'			Stadium: Victoria Park; Attendance: 4,055

11 March 2008 36	Doncaster Rovers	2–1	Gillingham	Doncaster
	Coppinger 4'; Heffernan 48' (pen.)		Crofts 56'	Stadium: Keepmoat Stadium; Attendance: 7,867

15 March 2008 37	Gillingham	0–3	Crewe Alexandra	Gillingham
	Maher (red card) 57'		Pope 9'; Maynard 50'; Morgan 76'	Stadium: Priestfield; Attendance: 4,956

22 March 2008 38	Gillingham	2–1	Bournemouth	Gillingham
	Crofts 9'; Jackson 26'		Kuffour 28'	Stadium: Priestfield; Attendance: 6,540

24 March 2008 39	Port Vale	2–1	Gillingham	Stoke on Trent
	Richards 19'; Whitaker 53'		Griffiths 78'	Stadium: Vale Park; Attendance: 3,157

29 March 2008 40	Gillingham	0–0	Carlisle United	Gillingham
				Stadium: Priestfield; Attendance: 6,673

1 April 2008 41	Gillingham	2–1	Luton Town	Gillingham
	Jackson 75', 87'		Parkin 19'	Stadium: Priestfield; Attendance: 6,142

5 April 2008 42	Millwall	1–1	Gillingham	London
	Robinson 75'		Southall 26'	Stadium: The Den; Attendance: 10,006

12 April 2008 43	Gillingham	1–2	Swansea City	Gillingham
	Oli 22'		Bauzà 44', 45'	Stadium: Priestfield; Attendance: 8,520

19 April 2008 44	Bristol Rovers	1–1	Gillingham	Bristol
	Elliott 84'		Nutter 38'	Stadium: Memorial Stadium; Attendance: 6,614

26 April 2008 45	Gillingham	1–1	Swindon Town	Gillingham
	Richards 2'		Aljofree 88'	Stadium: Priestfield; Attendance: 6,334

3 May 2008 46	Leeds United	2–1	Gillingham	Leeds
	Johnson 69'; Kandol 88'		Jackson 20'	Stadium: Elland Road; Attendance: 38,256

=== FA Cup ===
10 November 2007 Round 1	Barnet	2–1	Gillingham	London
	Yakubu 61'; Hatch 63'		[[David Graham (footballer, born 1978)|Graham]] 27'	Stadium: Underhill; Attendance: 2,843

=== League Cup ===
14 August 2007 Round 1	Watford	3–0	Gillingham	Watford
	Priskin 22'; Rinaldi 36'; Campana 71'		Sodje (red card) 52'	Stadium: Vicrage Road; Attendance: 8,166

=== Football League Trophy ===
9 October 2007 Southern Section Round 2	Gillingham	4–3	Luton Town	Gillingham
	Dickson 17', 74', 80'; Bentley 88'		Furlong 26', 43'; Spring 45' (pen.)	Stadium: Priestfield; Attendance: 1,417

13 November 2007 Southern Section Quarter Final	Gillingham	4–0	Dagenham & Redbridge	Gillingham
	Armstrong 17'; Brown 29'; Dickson 60' (pen.); Oli 70'		Rainford (red card) 58'	Stadium: Priestfield; Attendance: 2,904

8 January 2008 Southern Section Semi Final	Gillingham	1–1 (4–5 p)	Milton Keynes Dons	Gillingham
	Stone 84'		Johnson 85'	Stadium: Priestfield; Attendance: 3,717

== Players ==
=== First-team squad ===
Includes all players who were awarded squad numbers during the season.

Note: Flags indicate national team as defined under FIFA eligibility rules; some limited exceptions apply. Players may hold more than one non-FIFA nationality.

No.	Pos.	Nation	Player
1	GK	TTO	Kelvin Jack
2	FW	ENG	Donovan Simmonds (on loan from Coventry City)
4	DF	ENG	Danny Cullip
5	DF	ENG	Simon King
6	DF	ENG	Ian Cox
7	MF	ENG	Andrew Crofts
8	MF	ENG	Mark Bentley
9	FW	IRL	Gary Mulligan
10	FW	ENG	Delroy Facey
11	MF	ENG	Nicky Southall
12	GK	ENG	Simon Royce
13	GK	ENG	Chris Kiely
14	FW	ENG	Aaron Brown
16	DF	NGR	Efe Sodje
17	FW	ENG	Andy Pugh
18	MF	ENG	Craig Stone
19	DF	ENG	Sean Clohessy
20	FW	JAM	Simeon Jackson

No.	Pos.	Nation	Player
21	FW	ENG	Luis Cumbers
22	GK	SCO	Derek Stillie
23	MF	IRL	Barry Cogan
24	FW	CIV	Georges Ba
25	DF	ENG	Tom Bryant
26	MF	ENG	Tayler Thomas
27	MF	ENG	Kevin Maher (on loan from Southend United)
28	FW	ENG	Dennis Oli
29	MF	ENG	Charlie Howard
30	FW	ENG	Leroy Griffiths
31	DF	ENG	Adam Bygrave (on loan from Reading)
32	MF	ENG	Stuart Thurgood
35	DF	ENG	John Nutter
36	MF	ENG	Adam Miller
37	DF	ENG	Garry Richards
38	DF	ENG	Barry Fuller
39	MF	ENG	Stuart Lewis

=== Left club during season ===
Note: Flags indicate national team as defined under FIFA eligibility rules; some limited exceptions apply. Players may hold more than one non-FIFA nationality.

No.	Pos.	Nation	Player
29	MF	ENG	Adam Nowland (returned to parent club Preston North End following loan spell)
2	DF	ENG	Duncan Jupp
26	FW	ENG	Chris Dickson (returned to parent club Charlton Athletic following loan spell)
—	FW	ENG	Shabazz Baidoo (returned to parent club Queens Park Rangers following loan spell)
27	FW	ENG	Luke Freeman (joined Arsenal on 30 January 2008)
24	FW	COD	Guylain Ndumbu-Nsungu (joined Darlington on 30 January 2008)

No.	Pos.	Nation	Player
3	DF	ENG	Craig Armstrong
4	MF	NIR	Steve Lomas
20	FW	SCO	David Graham
2	MF	ENG	Craig Rocastle (returned to parent club Port Vale following loan spell)
15	MF	ENG	Marvin Hamilton
