= Tony Sinclair =

Tony Sinclair may refer to:

- Tony Sinclair (biologist), Canadian biologist
- Tony Sinclair (footballer), English footballer

== See also ==
- Anthony Sinclair, Australian rules footballer
