= Tom Murphy (English footballer) =

English footballer (born 1991)

Personal information
- Full name: Thomas William Murphy
- Date of birth: 19 December 1991 (age 34)
- Place of birth: Bexley, England
- Height: 5 ft 11 in (1.80 m)
- Position: Striker

Team information
- Current team: Cray Wanderers

Youth career
- –2008: Gillingham

Senior career*
Years	Team	Apps	(Gls)
2008–2010	Gillingham	0	(0)
2009–2010	→ Ashford Town (Kent) (loan)	21	(4)
2010–2011	Lewes	30	(5)
2011	Thurrock	5	(0)
2011	Farnborough	26	(4)
2011–2012	Horsham	?	(?)
2012–2013	Margate	16	(5)
2013–2015	Dover Athletic	70	(24)
2016	Maidstone United	17	(0)
2016	→ Eastbourne Borough (loan)	2	(0)
2016–2019	Dartford	74	(10)
2018	→ Margate (loan)	4	(1)
2018–2019	→ Tonbridge Angels (loan)	6	(1)
2019–2020	Cray Wanderers	20	(4)
2020	Hythe Town	5	(1)
- * Club domestic league appearances and goals as of 8 March 2020 (UTC)

Thomas William Murphy (born 19 December 1991) is an English semi-professional footballer.

== Career ==
The striker made his debut for Gillingham in the Football League Trophy 1–0 defeat against Colchester United on 7 October 2008, replacing Andy Barcham as a substitute in the 74th minute. In December 2009 Murphy was loaned to Isthmian League club Ashford Town (Kent) where he played for the remainder of the season. On 24 April 2010, in a 2-1 victory over Chatham Town, he scored the Ashford club's last goal before they were suspended and went into financial administration.

He joined Lewes as his next club but after scoring five goals in 30 appearances he was released on 7 February 2011 joining fellow Conference South side Thurrock on 25 February 2011. On 25 June 2011 Murphy signed for Horsham and then in February 2012 for Margate.

After a fruitful spell at Dover Athletic, Murphy signed for newly promoted Maidstone United in the summer of 2016. He joined Eastbourne Borough on loan in November 2016. The following month, at the conclusion of the loan spell, he joined Dartford on a permanent deal.

On 20 November 2018, Murphy returned to Margate on an initial month's loan from Dartford.

On 24 December 2018, Murphy was loaned to Tonbridge Angels on an initial month's loan from Dartford.

On 30 July 2019, Murphy joined Cray Wanderers, six months later on 24 January 2020 he moved on to Hythe Town.
