= 2001 Northern Ford Premiership =

Premiership
- League: Northern Ford Premiership
- Duration: 28 Rounds
- Teams: 19

2001 Season
- Grand Final winners: Widnes Vikings
- League leaders: Leigh Centurions

The 2001 Premiership season was the second tier of British rugby league during the 2001 season. The competition featured nineteen teams, with Widnes Vikings winning the Grand Final.

== Championship ==
The league was won by Widnes Vikings, who beat Oldham in the Grand Final. The League Leaders Leigh Centurions lost in the play-off semi-finals. Widnes Vikings were promoted to the Super League.

=== League table ===
	Team	Pld	W	D	L	PF	PA	Pts
1	Leigh Centurions	28	26	0	2	1139	321	52
2	Widnes Vikings	28	21	1	6	961	377	43
3	Rochdale Hornets	28	21	0	7	865	433	42
4	Oldham	28	21	0	7	780	416	42
5	Featherstone Rovers	28	18	0	10	825	401	36
6	Dewsbury Rams	28	18	0	10	801	438	36
7	Hull Kingston Rovers	28	16	2	10	555	450	34
8	Keighley Cougars	28	16	1	11	810	498	33
9	Workington Town	28	16	0	12	681	568	32
10	Whitehaven Warriors	28	15	1	12	608	419	31
11	Sheffield Eagles	28	14	0	14	637	543	28
12	Doncaster Dragons	28	14	0	14	622	532	28
13	Batley Bulldogs	28	13	0	15	452	618	26
14	Barrow Raiders	28	12	1	15	631	685	25
15	Swinton Lions	28	10	0	18	538	711	20
16	Hunslet Hawks	28	6	1	21	380	959	13
17	Gateshead Thunder	28	2	0	26	346	990	4
18	Chorley Lynx	28	2	0	26	395	1361	4
19	York Wasps	28	1	1	26	193	1499	3

Play-offs

== Play-offs ==
=== Week 1 ===
Dewsbury Rams 6–19 Hull Kingston Rovers

Featherstone Rovers 28–24 Keighley Cougars

Leigh Centurions 14–15 Oldham

Widnes Vikings 34–24 Rochdale Hornets

=== Week 2 ===
Leigh Centurions 26–10 Featherstone Rovers

Rochdale hornets 26–14 Hull Kingston Rovers

=== Week 3 ===
Leigh Centurions 18–26 Widnes Vikings

Oldham 39–32 Rochdale Hornets

=== Grand Final ===
28 July 2001

Widnes Vikings	24 – 14	Oldham
Try: Gee, Demetriou (2), Cantillon, Munro; Goal: Weston (2)		Try: Brennan, Ford, Mannion; Goal: Rich

Spotland, Rochdale
Attendance: 8,974
Referee: Steve Ganson (St Helens)
Player of the Match: Phil Cantillon

== See also ==
- 2001 Challenge Cup
