= Josh Gowling =

English football player and manager (born 1983)

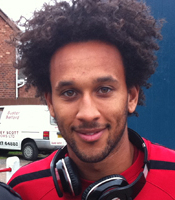
- Gowling in 2011

Personal information
- Full name: Joshua Anthony Isaac Gowling
- Date of birth: 29 November 1983 (age 42)
- Place of birth: Coventry, England
- Height: 6 ft 3 in (1.91 m)
- Position: Centre-back

Team information
- Current team: Coventry City (U18 lead coach)

Youth career
- 1998–2002: West Bromwich Albion

Senior career*
Years	Team	Apps	(Gls)
2002–2003	West Bromwich Albion	0	(0)
2003–2005	Herfølge	30	(0)
2004–2005	→ Ølstykke FC (loan)	13	(0)
2005–2008	AFC Bournemouth	83	(1)
2008	Carlisle United	4	(0)
2008–2009	→ Hereford United (loan)	13	(0)
2009	→ Gillingham (loan)	4	(0)
2009–2011	Gillingham	52	(4)
2010	→ Lincoln City (loan)	4	(0)
2011–2012	Lincoln City	37	(0)
2012–2015	Kidderminster Harriers	106	(6)
2015	→ Grimsby Town (loan)	3	(1)
2015–2017	Grimsby Town	58	(3)
2017–2018	Torquay United	25	(0)
2018	→ Alfreton Town (loan)	10	(0)
2018–2020	Hereford	38	(3)
Total		398	(17)

Managerial career
- 2020–2023: Hereford
- 2023: Darlington
- * Club domestic league appearances and goals

Joshua Anthony Isaac Gowling (born 29 November 1983) is an English football coach, former manager and former professional footballer, who played as a centre-back. He is under-18 lead coach at Premier League club Coventry City.

Gowling began his career with West Bromwich Albion and saw action on the continent when he moved to Danish side Herfølge, where he also took in a loan spell with Ølstykke FC. He returned to England in 2005 and played professionally for AFC Bournemouth, Carlisle United, Hereford United, Gillingham, Lincoln City, Kidderminster Harriers and Grimsby Town. In 2017 he joined Torquay United and had a spell on loan with Alfreton Town before joining Hereford. He was appointed manager in January 2020 and left the role in February 2023.

== Playing career ==
=== Early career ===
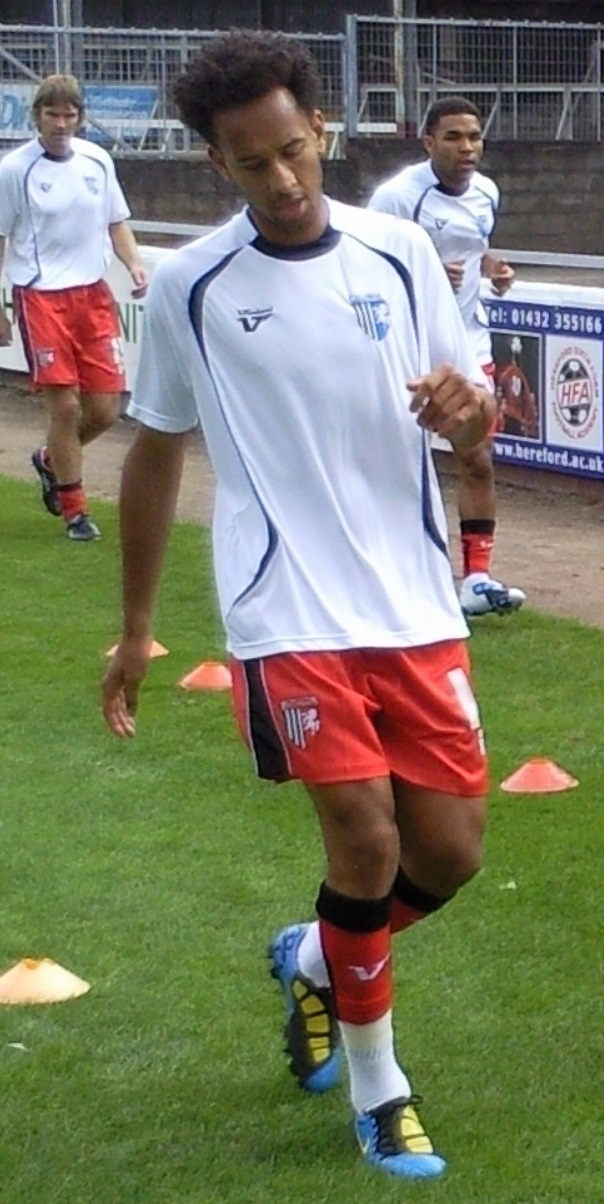
Gowling with The Gills

A central defender, Gowling began his career as a trainee at West Bromwich Albion aged just 14 under the guidance of Richard O'Kelly.

Following his release from Albion, he signed for Danish Premier Division club Herfølge Boldklub, making 17 appearances in 2003–04 and 13 appearances in 2004–05. He soon became disillusioned with life in Denmark, and returned to England.

=== AFC Bournemouth ===
He joined AFC Bournemouth on a trial basis to begin with in the 2005 close season, and signed a one-year contract after impressing in various pre-season friendlies. He began the 2005–06 season in good form before rupturing his knee ligaments after about a minute's play in the away match to Brentford – this serious injury ruled him out for the rest of the season. Having gradually returned to full fitness following his injury, Gowling featured in over 30 league games during the 2006–07 season, scoring his first professional goal in the process in a game against Rotherham United.

His performance in the 2–0 home win against Yeovil Town on 15 March 2008 saw him named in the League One Team of the Week. In 2007–08 he made 39 league appearances as Bournemouth were relegated to League Two.

=== Carlisle United ===
On 19 June 2008 Gowling, whose contract with Bournemouth had run out, signed for Carlisle United on a free transfer. He agreed a two-year contract with the club, who had lost in the League One play-offs the previous season, but spent most of that season on loan at Hereford, against whom he had made his league debut for Carlisle.

=== Gillingham ===
In July 2009 Gowling joined Gillingham on loan, initially for a month, and made his debut on 8 August in a 5–0 home win over Swindon Town. On 26 August 2009, Gowling transferred to Gillingham on a two-year contract, just two days after extending the loan deal for another month.

On 28 October 2010 he agreed to join Lincoln City on a month-long loan deal with the paperwork being completed the following day. He returned to Gillingham at the end of his loan deal.

In July 2011, he joined Crewe Alexandra on trial playing seventy minutes in the club's 4–0 friendly victory at Congleton Town on 11 July 2011 but was not offered a contract.

=== Lincoln City ===
On 14 July 2011, he agreed a two-year contract to return to Lincoln City. On 31 August 2012 he left Lincoln City by mutual consent

=== Kidderminster Harriers ===
On the same day he agreed a deal to sign for Kidderminster Harriers. Gowling became a key figure in the Harriers defence, ending the 2012–13 season in the Conference team of the year alongside teammates Lee Vaughan and Anthony Malbon, a season where Harriers finished 2nd, behind Mansfield Town. Gowling took the captain's armband for the 2014–15 season and also took a player/coach role within the club.

=== Grimsby Town ===
On 26 March 2015, Gowling joined Grimsby Town on loan till the end of the season. He scored on his debut for the Mariners on 6 April 2015, from a corner he fired in Jack Mackreth's cross in the 69th minute, breaking the deadlock in the 0–2 victory over Alfreton Town, with a right footed shot 3 yards out from the centre of the box to the bottom right corner.

On 28 May 2015, Gowling signed a permanent two-year deal with the club. Gowling played in Grimsby's 3–1 victory over Forest Green Rovers in the 2016 National League play-off final at Wembley, seeing Grimsby promoted to League Two after a six-year absence from the Football League. His efforts over the season earned him a place in the 2015–16 National League team of the year, alongside the league's outstanding players.

After making 21 appearances for Grimsby in the 2016–17 season he was released by the club on 9 May 2017.

=== Torquay United ===
He then signed for Torquay United on 13 June 2017. Gowling made 25 appearances for The Gulls as they were relegated from the National League.

He was transfer-listed by Torquay at the end of the 2017–18 season.

=== Alfreton Town ===
On 13 August 2018, Gowling joined Alfreton Town on loan, making 10 league appearances in the National League North.

=== Hereford ===
Gowling signed for National League North club Hereford on 7 December 2018.

== Managerial career ==
=== Hereford ===
On 21 January 2020, he was appointed as interim manager, following the departure of Russell Slade. Hereford encountered mixed form in Gowling's first months as interim manager, with the 2019–20 National League North season eventually curtailed due to the COVID-19 pandemic.

In June 2020, he was given the job on a permanent basis, appointing Steve Burr as his assistant.

On 5 February 2023, Gowling left Hereford by mutual consent.

=== Darlington ===
Gowling was appointed manager of National League North club Darlington on 19 September 2023, but was dismissed from the role three months later.

== Career statistics ==
As of end of 2017–18 season

Club	Season	League			National cup		League Cup		Other		Total	
Club	Season	Division	Apps	Goals	Apps	Goals	Apps	Goals	Apps	Goals	Apps	Goals
West Bromwich Albion	2002–03	Premier League	0	0	0	0	0	0	0	0	0	0
Herfølge	2003–04	Danish Superliga	17	0	0	0	0	0	0	0	17	0
Herfølge	2004–05	Danish Superliga	13	0	0	0	0	0	0	0	13	0
Herfølge	Total		30	0	0	0	0	0	0	0	30	0
Ølstykke FC (loan)	2004–05	Danish 1st Division	13	0	0	0	0	0	0	0	13	0
AFC Bournemouth	2005–06	League One	13	0	0	0	1	0	1 (Note: Appearance(s) in Football League Trophy)	0	15	0
AFC Bournemouth	2006–07	League One	33	1	1	0	1	0	1	0	36	1
AFC Bournemouth	2007–08	League One	37	0	3	0	1	0	2	0	42	0
AFC Bournemouth	Total		83	1	4	0	3	0	4	0	94	1
Carlisle United	2008–09	League One	4	0	1	0	0	0	1	0	6	0
Hereford United (loan)	2008–09	League One	13	0	0	0	0	0	0	0	13	0
Gillingham	2009–10	League One	30	1	3	0	2	0	1	0	36	1
Gillingham	2010–11	League One	22	2	0	0	1	0	1	0	24	2
Gillingham	Total		52	3	3	0	3	0	2	0	60	3
Lincoln City	2010–11	League Two	4	0	2	0	0	0	0	0	6	0
Lincoln City	2011–12	Conference Premier	37	0	0	0	—		2 (Note: Appearance(s) in FA Trophy)	0	39	0
Lincoln City	Total		41	0	2	0	0	0	2	0	45	0
Kidderminster Harriers	2012–13	Conference Premier	40	4	2	0	—		4 (Note: Two appearances in FA Trophy, two in Football Conference play-offs)	0	46	4
Kidderminster Harriers	2013–14	Conference Premier	36	2	7	0	—		0	0	42	2
Kidderminster Harriers	2014–15	Conference Premier	30	0	0	0	—		1	1	31	1
Kidderminster Harriers	Total		106	6	9	0	0	0	5	1	120	7
Grimsby Town	2014–15	Conference Premier	3	1	0	0	—		2 (Note: Appearances in Football Conference play-offs)	0	5	1
Grimsby Town	2015–16	National League	37	2	3	0	—		6 (Note: Three appearances in FA Trophy, three in National League play-offs)	0	46	2
Grimsby Town	2016–17	League Two	18	0	1	0	0	0	2 (Note: Appearances in EFL Trophy)	0	21	0
Grimsby Town	Total		58	3	4	0	0	0	10	0	72	3
Torquay United	2017–18	National League	25	0	0	0	—		0	0	25	0
Career total			425	13	23	0	6	0	24	1	478	14

== Managerial statistics ==
As of 16 December 2023

Managerial record by team and tenure
Team	From	To	Record					Ref
Team	From	To	G	W	D	L	Win %	Ref
Hereford	21 January 2020	5 February 2023	112	43	27	42	38.39	
Darlington	19 September 2023	26 December 2023	16	3	4	9	18.75	
Total			128	46	31	51	35.94	—

== Honours ==
=== As a player ===
Grimsby Town

- National League play-offs: 2016
- FA Trophy runner-up: 2015–16

Individual

- Conference Premier Team of the Year: 2012–13
- National League Team of the Year: 2015–16

=== As a manager ===
Individual

- National League North Manager of the Month: October 2022
