= Andy Pugh =

English footballer (born 1989)

Personal information
- Full name: Andrew John Pugh
- Date of birth: 28 January 1989 (age 37)
- Place of birth: Gravesend, England
- Height: 1.75 m (5 ft 9 in)
- Position: Striker

Youth career
- 2005–2007: Gillingham

Senior career*
Years	Team	Apps	(Gls)
2007–2010	Gillingham	6	(0)
2007	→ Welling United (loan)	6	(2)
2008	→ Maidstone United (loan)	4	(2)
2008	→ Folkestone Invicta (loan)	6	(3)
2009	→ Grays Athletic (loan)	17	(7)
2009	→ Dover Athletic (loan)	3	(1)
2009	→ Welling United (loan)	13	(7)
2010	→ Histon (loan)	6	(1)
2010–2012	Welling United	61	(33)
2012–2014	Cambridge United	52	(13)
2013	→ Ebbsfleet United (loan)	2	(1)
2014	→ Dartford (loan)	4	(2)
2014–2020	Dartford	143	(44)
2019	→ East Thurrock United (loan)	4	(4)
2020	→ Sevenoaks Town (loan)	3	(1)
2020–2022	Chatham Town	16	(9)
2022	→ Phoenix Sports (loan)	4	(3)
2022–2023	Phoenix Sports	31	(13)
- * Club domestic league appearances and goals as of 20:51, 1 April 2022 (UTC)

Andrew John Pugh (born 28 January 1989) is an English professional footballer who most recently played as a striker for Phoenix Sports.

== Career ==
Pugh signed scholarship forms with Gillingham in 2005 and made his debut as a substitute in a home defeat to Brighton & Hove Albion on 20 February 2007. It was announced on 8 May 2007 that Pugh had signed his first professional contract, a one-year deal with option of another year. In October 2007 he joined Welling United on a one-month loan deal. On 15 February, Pugh joined Maidstone United on a month's loan.

In August 2008, Pugh joined Folkestone Invicta on a one-month loan deal to gain first-team experience, and had another loan spell later the same season at Grays Athletic. Pugh made his debut for Grays starting in the 1–1 home draw against Weymouth. His loan spell at Grays was extended until the end of the 2008–09 season, despite Gillingham manager Mark Stimson's wishes to recall him. Pugh was sent-off in Grays' 2–1 away defeat on 13 April, ruling him out of the last three games of the Conference National season.

In September 2009, Pugh joined Dover Athletic on a month's loan after Andy Hessenthaler's side were hampered by injuries. Pugh scored a debut goal for Dover in a 4–2 victory over Hampton & Richmond Borough. Welling United re-signed Pugh on a one-month loan deal in November. In March 2010, Pugh joined Conference National side Histon on loan for a month. His contract at Gillingham finished at the end of that season, and was not renewed. After his Gillingham contract finished Pugh, along with Luis Cumbers, signed for Welling.

On 25 January 2012, Pugh signed for Cambridge United on a two-and-a-half-year contract for a fee of £15,000. The transfer was protracted throughout the January transfer window as Pugh was unable to take a medical at the due to a knee injury. On 9 January 2014, Pugh had signed a one-month loan deal to join Dartford alongside fellow Cambridge United player Rory McAuley. He was recalled back to the Abbey Stadium on 14 February 2014, ready to take part in the club's FA Trophy semi-final against Grimsby Town. Pugh was released by Cambridge on 27 May 2014.

On 23 August 2019, Pugh joined East Thurrock United on dual registration terms.

On 28 February 2020, Pugh joined Sevenoaks Town on dual registration terms.

On 22 June 2020, Pugh joined Chatham Town ahead of the 2020–21 season.

== Career statistics ==
As of match played 14 September 2022

Appearances and goals by club, season and competition
Club	Season	League			FA Cup		League Cup		Other		Total	
Club	Season	Division	Apps	Goals	Apps	Goals	Apps	Goals	Apps	Goals	Apps	Goals
Gillingham	2006–07	League One	3	0	0	0	0	0	0	0	3	0
Gillingham	2007–08	League One	2	0	0	0	1	0	0	0	3	0
Gillingham	2008–09	League Two	1	0	1	0	0	0	1 (Note: Appearance in Football League Trophy)	0	3	0
Gillingham	Gillingham total		6	0	1	0	1	0	1	0	9	0
Welling United (loan)	2007–08	Conference South	6	2	0	0	—		0	0	6	2
Maidstone United (loan)	2007–08	Isthmian League Premier Division	4	2	0	0	—		0	0	4	2
Folkestone Invicta (loan)	2008–09	Isthmian League Division One South	6	3	0	0	—		0	0	6	3
Grays Athletic (loan)	2008–09	Conference Premier	17	7	0	0	—		0	0	17	7
Dover Athletic (loan)	2009–10	Conference South	3	1	0	0	—		0	0	3	1
Welling United (loan)	2009–10	Conference South	13	7	0	0	—		2 (Note: Appearance(s) in FA Trophy)	1	15	8
Histon (loan)	2009–10	Conference Premier	6	1	0	0	—		0	0	6	1
Welling United	2010–11	Conference South	39	17	1	0	—		1	0	41	17
Welling United	2011–12	Conference South	22	16	1	0	—		3	3	26	19
Welling United	Welling United total		61	33	2	0	—		4	3	67	36
Cambridge United	2011–12	Conference Premier	13	3	0	0	—		0	0	13	3
Cambridge United	2012–13	Conference Premier	26	4	1	0	—		2	0	29	4
Cambridge United	2013–14	Conference Premier	13	6	0	0	—		3	0	16	6
Cambridge United	Cambridge United total		52	13	1	0	—		5	0	58	13
Ebbsfleet United (loan)	2013–14	Conference South	2	1	0	0	—		0	0	2	1
Dartford (loan)	2013–14	Conference Premier	4	2	0	0	—		0	0	4	2
Dartford	2014–15	Conference Premier	29	4	1	0	—		1	1	31	5
Dartford	2015–16	National League South	34	14	1	0	—		5 (Note: Appearance(s) in Kent Senior Cup)	0	40	14
Dartford	2016–17	National League South	35	13	4	2	—		6 (Note: Appearance in National League South Play-Offs)	2	45	17
Dartford	2017–18	National League South	33	13	3	1	—		4	0	40	14
Dartford	2018–19	National League South	2	0	0	0	—		0	0	2	0
Dartford	2019–20	National League South	10	0	1	1	—		2	0	13	1
Dartford	Dartford total		147	46	10	4	—		18	3	175	53
East Thurrock United (dual)	2019–20	Isthmian League Premier Division	4	4	0	0	—		0	0	4	4
Sevenoaks Town (dual)	2019–20	Isthmian League South East Division	3	1	—		—		—		3	1
Chatham Town	2020–21	Southern Counties East Football League Premier Division	2	0	0	0	—		1 (Note: Appearance(s) in FA Vase)	1	3	1
Chatham Town	2021–22	Southern Counties East Football League Premier Division	13	8	0	0	—		2 (Note: Appearance(s) in SCEFL Challenge Cup) (Note: Appearance(s) in Kent Senior Trophy)	1	15	9
Chatham Town	2022–23	Isthmian League South East Division	1	1	0	0	—		0	0	1	1
Chatham Town	Chatham Town total		16	9	0	0	—		3	2	19	11
Career total			346	130	14	4	1	0	33	9	394	143

== Honours ==
Cambridge United

- FA Trophy: 2013–14
