= Chris Dickson (footballer) =

British-born Ghanaian footballer (born 1984)

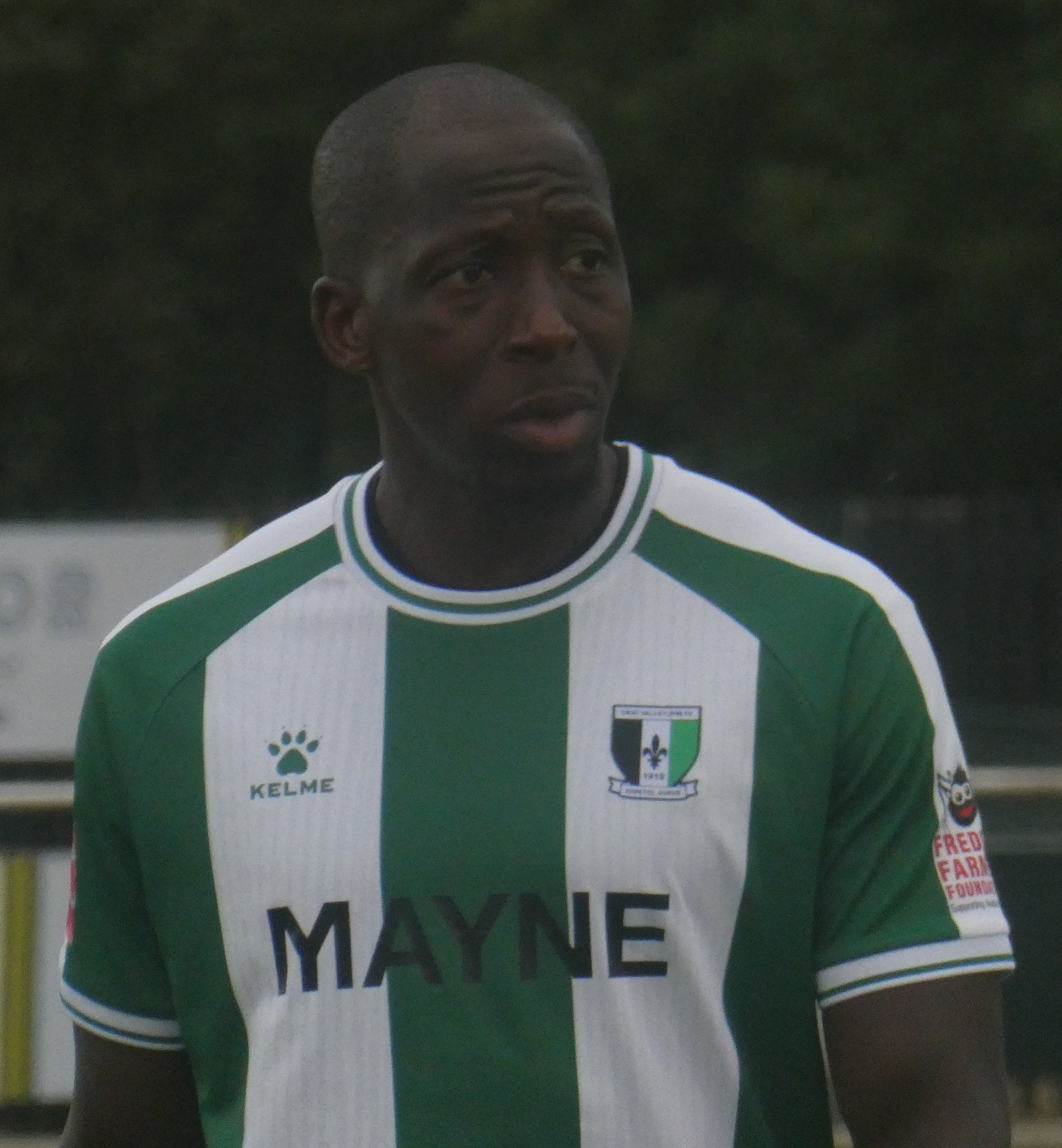
- Dickson playing for Cray Valley Paper Mills in 2026

Personal information
- Full name: Christopher Alexander Kofi Dickson
- Date of birth: 28 December 1984 (age 41)
- Place of birth: East Dulwich, England
- Height: 5 ft 11 in (1.80 m)
- Position: Striker

Team information
- Current team: Cray Valley Paper Mills

Senior career*
Years	Team	Apps	(Gls)
2004–2006	Erith & Belvedere	75	(35)
2006–2007	Dulwich Hamlet	34	(26)
2007–2010	Charlton Athletic	28	(0)
2007	→ Crewe Alexandra (loan)	3	(0)
2007	→ Gillingham (loan)	12	(7)
2009	→ Bristol Rovers (loan)	14	(4)
2010	→ Gillingham (loan)	9	(1)
2010–2012	Nea Salamis	44	(22)
2012	AEL Limassol	19	(3)
2013	Shanghai Dongya	5	(0)
2013–2014	Dagenham & Redbridge	25	(1)
2014–2015	Pafos FC	24	(19)
2015–2016	Enosis Neon Paralimni	15	(3)
2016	Ermis Aradippou	16	(5)
2016	Sutton United	20	(0)
2017–2018	Chelmsford City	57	(22)
2018–2019	Hampton & Richmond Borough	37	(16)
2019–2021	Hornchurch	47	(28)
2020–2021	→ Dartford (loan)	7	(3)
2021	Erith & Belvedere	1	(0)
2021–2022	Cray Wanderers	32	(11)
2022–2023	Billericay Town	21	(6)
2022–2023	→ Brentwood Town (loan)	4	(1)
2023	Hornchurch	14	(4)
2023	Erith & Belvedere	9	(3)
2023–2024	Chatham Town	25	(10)
2024–2025	Horsham	38	(14)
2025	Sittingbourne	0	(0)
2025–2026	Cray Wanderers	23	(3)
2026	Carshalton Athletic	3	(0)
2026–	Cray Valley Paper Mills	25	(11)

International career
2008–2009	Ghana	2	(0)
- * Club domestic league appearances and goals as of 17:10, 15 November 2026 (UTC)

Christopher Alexander Kofi Dickson (born 28 December 1984) is a football player who plays as a striker for Cray Valley Paper Mills. He formerly represented the Ghana national football team.

== Club career ==
Dickson started his career at Erith & Belvedere before moving to Dulwich Hamlet in the summer of 2006. He scored 31 goals in 36 games for Dulwich in the 2006–07 season.

Dickson signed for Charlton Athletic on 12 March 2007 from Dulwich Hamlet for £35,000, signing a two-and-a-half-year deal after scoring twice in a reserve-team game for Charlton. As he was signed outside the transfer window, he was prevented from making a competitive appearance for Charlton, although he maintained his healthy scoring record for the reserve-team. He made his debut for Charlton against Swindon Town in the League Cup in August 2007.

In the first half of the 2007–08 season, Dickson went out on loan to two League One clubs. First he joined Crewe Alexandra but failed to score in three games. Crewe declined an option to renew his loan, and he joined Gillingham on loan in September 2007. His time at Priestfield was far more productive, totalling 11 goals in 14 games, including a hat-trick on his full debut against Luton Town. This goal haul was sufficient to make him Gillingham's top scorer that season, even though he was recalled to The Valley in December 2007.

He scored his first goal for Charlton in an FA Cup third Round replay against West Bromwich Albion, but shortly after was ruled out for the rest of the season due to injury. He signed a new two-year deal with Charlton in August 2008. Dickson began a three-month loan spell at Bristol Rovers by scoring twice in a 3–1 win away at Brentford on 19 September 2009, and went on to play 14 league matches for them. He returned to Gillingham for a second loan spell, also of three months, in February 2010. After an unsuccessful trial at League Two side Stevenage, Dickson joined Nea Salamis Famagusta FC on a two-year contract.

After winning the Cypriot First Division and finishing as a runner up in the Cypriot Cup with AEL Limassol, for whom he also scored in the Europa League against Marseille, and Shanghai Dongya, Dickson joined League Two side Dagenham & Redbridge on a free transfer, leaving in 2014. He subsequently spent three seasons playing in Cyprus, taking in spells at Pafos, Enosis Neon Paralimni and Ermis Aradippou. In the summer of 2016, Dickson returned to England, signing for National League side Sutton United. He made his full league debut in a 4–0 away defeat to Chester on 27 August. On 9 December, Dickson was released by Sutton United having made nine full and 11 substitute appearances in the league, as well as two substitute appearances in the FA Cup, without scoring a goal.

Dickson signed for National League South side Chelmsford City on 6 January 2017. He made his debut after coming on as a substitution against Whitehawk and scored his first goals for the club when he scored twice against Hemel Hempstead Town. One week later Dickson went on to score four goals against Eastbourne Borough.

Dickson joined Hampton & Richmond Borough in July 2018, before moving on to Hornchurch a year later.

On 21 November 2020, Dickson joined Dartford on dual registration terms and - on the same day - scored two goals on his debut against Slough Town.

Dickson briefly returned to Erith & Belvedere; the club where he started his career.

On 26 October 2021, Dickson joined Cray Wanderers.

On 30 July 2022, Dickson joined Billericay Town.

On 30 December 2022, Dickson joined Brentwood Town on a one-month loan deal.

On 3 February 2023, Dickson rejoined Hornchurch.

In June 2023, Dickson returned to his first club, newly promoted Isthmian League South East Division side Erith & Belvedere. He made the step up a division to join Chatham Town in November 2023.

On 26 July 2024, Dickson joined Horsham. On 28 December 2024, Dickson became the first senior footballer to score a hat-trick on his 40th birthday, in a 6–0 win over Potters Bar Town in the Isthmian League. He departed the club at the end of the 2024–25 season following a title-winning campaign.

In July 2025, Dickson joined Isthmian League South East Division side Sittingbourne. Just three weeks after joining the club however, he departed by mutual consent, returning to Cray Wanderers. On 26 January 2026, Dickson left Cray Wanderers.

On 13 March 2026, Dickson signed for Cray Valley Paper Mills.

== International career ==
Dickson was eligible to play internationally for England, Jamaica or Ghana as a result of his place of birth and nationality of his mother and father respectively. He was selected as part of Ghana's initial 40-man squad ahead of the African Cup of Nations in 2008, but failed to make the final squad. He made his debut for the Black Stars in August 2008.

== Career statistics ==
=== Club ===
As of 14 November 2026

Appearances and goals by club, season and competition
Club	Season	League			National Cup		League Cup		Other		Total	
Club	Season	Division	Apps	Goals	Apps	Goals	Apps	Goals	Apps	Goals	Apps	Goals
Erith & Belvedere	2004–05	SL Division One East	16	15	0	0	—		0	0	16	15
Dulwich Hamlet	2005–06	IL Division One South	6	6	—		—		—		6	6
Dulwich Hamlet	2006–07	IL Division One South	28	20	2	1	—		6 (Note: One appearance in Westview Cup, two appearances and two goals in FA Trophy, two appearances and five goals in London Senior Cup, one appearance and three goals in Surrey Senior Cup)	10	36	31
Dulwich Hamlet	Total		34	26	2	1	—		6	10	42	37
Charlton Athletic	2007–08	Championship	2	0	2	1	1	0	—		5	1
Charlton Athletic	2008–09	Championship	21	0	2	1	1	0	—		24	1
Charlton Athletic	2009–10	League One	5	0	0	0	0	0	0	0	5	0
Charlton Athletic	Total		28	0	4	2	2	0	0	0	34	2
Crewe Alexandra (loan)	2007–08	League One	3	0	—		—		—		3	0
Gillingham (loan)	2007–08	League One	12	7	—		—		2 (Note: Appearances in Football League Trophy)	4	14	11
Bristol Rovers (loan)	2009–10	League One	14	4	—		—		—		14	4
Gillingham (loan)	2009–10	League One	9	1	—		—		—		9	1
Nea Salamis	2010–11	Cypriot Second Division	27	18	0	0	—		—		27	18
Nea Salamis	2011–12	Cypriot First Division	17	4	0	0	—		0	0	17	4
Nea Salamis	Total		44	22	0	0	—		—		44	22
AEL Limassol	2011–12	Cypriot First Division	13	3	6	1	—		—		19	4
AEL Limassol	2012–13	Cypriot First Division	6	0	—		—		9 (Note: Six appearances and one goal in UEFA Champions League, three appearances and one goal in UEFA Europa League)	2	15	2
AEL Limassol	Total		19	3	6	1	—		9	2	34	6
Shanghai Dongya	2013	Chinese Super League	5	0	—		—		0	0	5	0
Dagenham & Redbridge	2013–14	League Two	25	1	1	0	—		2	1	28	2
Pafos FC	2014–15	Cypriot Second Division	24	19	0	0	—		—		24	19
Enosis Neon Paralimni	2015–16	Cypriot First Division	15	3	—		—		—		15	3
Ermis Aradippou	2015–16	Cypriot First Division	16	5	2	1	—		—		18	6
Sutton United	2016–17	National League	20	0	2	0	—		—		22	0
Chelmsford City	2016–17	National League South	18	8	—		—		5 (Note: Three appearances and one goal in National League South play-offs, two appearances in the FA Trophy)	2	23	10
Chelmsford City	2017–18	National League South	39	14	2	0	—		1 (Note: One appearance in National League South play-offs)	0	42	14
Chelmsford City	Total		57	22	2	0	0	0	6	2	65	24
Hampton & Richmond Borough	2018–19	National League South	37	16	4	3	—		0	0	41	19
Hornchurch	2019–20	Isthmian League Premier Division	33	21	2	1	—		6 (Note: Five appearances in the FA Trophy and one appearance in the Essex Senior Cup)	4	41	26
Hornchurch	2020–21	Isthmian League Premier Division	9	7	2	1	—		5 (Note: Five appearances in the FA Trophy)	0	16	8
Hornchurch	2021–22	Isthmian League Premier Division	5	0	4	0	—		1 (Note: One appearance in the Pitching In Super Cup)	0	10	0
Hornchurch	Total		47	28	8	2	0	0	11	4	66	34
Dartford (loan)	2020–21	National League South	7	3	0	0	—		0	0	7	3
Erith & Belvedere	2021–22	Southern Counties East Football League Premier Division	1	0	—		—		1 (Note: One appearance in the Kent Senior Trophy)	2	2	2
Cray Wanderers	2021–22	Isthmian League Premier Division	32	11	—		—		3 (Note: Three appearances in the FA Trophy)	1	35	12
Billericay Town	2022–23	Isthmian League Premier Division	21	6	4	2	—		3 (Note: Three appearances in the FA Trophy)	1	28	9
Brentwood Town (loan)	2022–23	Isthmian League North Division	4	1	—		—		—		4	1
Hornchurch	2022–23	Isthmian League Premier Division	14	4	—		—		2 (Note: Two appearances in Isthmian League Premier Division play-offs)	0	16	4
Erith & Belvedere	2023–24	Isthmian League South East Division	9	3	4	3	—		3 (Note: One appearance in Velocity Cup, one appearance in the FA Trophy and one appearance in the Kent Senior Cup)	3	16	9
Chatham Town	2023–24	Isthmian League Premier Division	25	10	—		—		2 (Note: Two appearances in the Isthmian League Premier Division Play-Offs.)	0	27	10
Horsham	2024–25	Isthmian League Premier Division	38	14	5	3	—		8 (Note: Four appearances and one goal in the FA Trophy, four appearances in the Sussex Senior Cup)	2	51	19
Sittingbourne	2025–26	Isthmian League South East Division	0	0	0	0	—		0	0	0	0
Cray Wanderers	2025–26	Isthmian League Premier Division	23	3	2	0	—		1 (Note: One appearance in the FA Trophy)	0	26	3
Carshalton Athletic	2025–26	Isthmian League Premier Division	3	0	0	0	—		0	0	3	0
Cray Valley Paper Mills	2025–26	Isthmian League Premier Division	8	3	0	0	—		0	0	8	3
Cray Valley Paper Mills	2026–27	Isthmian League South East Division	17	8	1	2	—		1 (Note: One appearance in the FA Trophy)	0	19	10
Cray Valley Paper Mills	Total		25	11	1	2	0	0	1	0	27	13
Career total			627	238	47	20	2	0	61	32	737	290

=== International ===
As of match played 12 August 2009

Appearances and goals by national team and year
National team	Year	Apps	Goals
Ghana	2008	1	0
Ghana	2009	1	0
Total		2	0

== Honours ==
Ael Limassol

- 2011–12 Cypriot First Division

Hornchurch

- FA Trophy: 2020–21

Horsham

- 2024–25 Isthmian Premier League
