= Jacob Erskine =

British footballer (born 1989)

Personal information
- Full name: Emmanuel Jacob Kenneth Erskine
- Date of birth: 13 January 1989 (age 37)
- Place of birth: Lambeth, England
- Height: 1.85 m (6 ft 1 in)
- Position: Striker

Senior career*
Years	Team	Apps	(Gls)
2006–2007	Croydon Athletic		
2007–2009	Dagenham & Redbridge	0	(0)
2007	→ Wingate & Finchley (loan)	1	(1)
2007–2008	→ Tooting & Mitcham United (loan)	6	(2)
2008	→ Maidstone United (loan)		
2008	→ Redbridge (loan)	15	(8)
2008	→ Margate (loan)	3	(0)
2009	→ Sutton United (loan)		
2009	→ Dorchester Town (loan)	9	(1)
2009	Bromley	0	(0)
2009–2010	Gillingham	4	(0)
2009	→ Bromley (loan)		
2010	→ Bishops Stortford (loan)	5	(1)
2010	→ Croydon Athletic (loan)		
2010–2011	Concord Rangers		
2011	Forest Green Rovers	0	(0)
2011	→ Swindon Supermarine (loan)	6	(2)
2011	Ebbsfleet United	15	(1)
2011	Hampton & Richmond Borough	10	(3)
2011–2013	Dartford	69	(14)
2013	Whitehawk	3	(1)
2013	Bromley	1	(0)
2013–2015	Maidenhead United	28	(2)
2015–2016	Dulwich Hamlet	19	(7)
2016	→ Cray Wanderers (loan)	4	(1)
2017	Dulwich Hamlet	4	(1)
- * Club domestic league appearances and goals as of 17:00, 1 May 2017 (UTC)

Emmanuel Jacob Kenneth Erskine (born 13 January 1989), more commonly known as Jacob Erskine, is an English footballer who last played as a striker for Dulwich Hamlet. Earlier in his career, he made some Football League appearances for Gillingham.

== Career ==
Born in London, Erskine started his career at non-League club Croydon Athletic, before joining his first Football League club, Dagenham & Redbridge. He was sent out on loan to non-league clubs Tooting & Mitcham United, Dorchester Town, Margate and Maidstone United, but was ultimately released by Dagenham at the end of the 2008–09 season, having failed to break into the first team in two years with the club.

He spent the close season with Bromley, for whom he played in a friendly against Gillingham, impressing their manager Mark Stimson sufficiently to earn a one-year contract with the Football League One club. The deal included a clause stipulating that Bromley will benefit financially should Gillingham sell Erskine to another club, as well as "certain other terms which Bromley feel will benefit the club in the long run".

Erskine made his Football League debut as a late substitute in Gillingham's opening game of the 2009–10 season on 8 August against Swindon Town, replacing Mark Bentley in a 5–0 win.

He was loaned back to Bromley for a month in October 2009, making five appearances for them, and scoring in an FA Cup qualifying round match. Erskine then joined another Conference South side in the form of Bishop's Stortford.

Erskine was released by Gillingham at the end of the 2009–10 season. During the 2010–11 season, he signed for Isthmian League Premier Division side Concord Rangers.

On 21 January 2011, Erskine signed for Conference National side Forest Green Rovers. He was instantly loaned out to Southern League Premier Division outfit Swindon Supermarine to gain match fitness.

Erskine then signed for Ebbsfleet United in February 2011 having not made a single appearance for Forest Green. In August 2011, Erskine was informed by Ebbsfleet manager Liam Daish, that there would be no funds available to offer him a new contract for the 2011–12 season. He was then on trial for Northampton Town playing in a trial match against Milton Keynes Dons, but later signed non-contract terms with Hampton & Richmond Borough. Erskine left Hampton & Richmond in October 2011.

In October 2011, Erskine signed for Dartford, scoring his first goal for the club on 25 October in a 3–0 win against Thurrock. He finished the season with 17 goals, as Dartford were promoted into the Conference National. Erskine started the 2012–13 season with a lack of goals. Despite this, Dartford manager Tony Burman said that he was impressed with Erskine's performance so far in the league, but released him at the end of that season. He then had a brief spell with Bromley during pre-season, but joined Whitehawk soon after. However, after a matter of weeks, he left the Hawks and rejoined Bromley on 27 September 2013. Just four days later, Erskine scored on his return debut, netting Bromley's second goal in a 3–2 win over Cray Wanderers in the Kent Senior Cup. He also scored in Bromley's 2–1 FA Cup defeat to Heybridge Swifts, but was released days later after making three appearances in all competitions. He then joined Maidenhead United, going on to make his debut in a 3–1 home defeat to Dorchester Town. His second appearance came against the club he had just left, Bromley. Maidenhead lost the match 1–0.

Following two seasons with Maidenhead, Erskine moved to Dulwich Hamlet at the start of June 2015, opening his account for the club with two goals against Kingstonian in a 3–0 Isthmian League Premier Division away win on 31 August 2015. He went on loan to Cray Wanderers in March 2016, but the loan spell was caught short after Erskine suffered an achilles injury in only his fourth appearance, a set-back which would rule him out for the rest of the 2015–16 season, and the remainder of his contract with Dulwich.

However, following his recovery from injury Erskine returned to training with Dulwich in early 2017, and made his second debut for the club in a 5–2 FA Trophy victory over Braintree Town on 7 February 2017, coming off the bench to score the fifth goal in second half stoppage time. His second spell at the club came to an end at the close of that season.
