= Callum Davies (footballer) =

English footballer

Personal information
- Full name: Callum Joshua Davies
- Date of birth: 8 February 1993 (age 33)
- Place of birth: Sittingbourne, England
- Height: 6 ft 1 in (1.85 m)
- Position: Defender

Team information
- Current team: Deal Town

Youth career
- –2010: Gillingham

Senior career*
Years	Team	Apps	(Gls)
2010–2015	Gillingham	29	(0)
2011	→ Lewes (loan)	10	(0)
2011	→ Thurrock (loan)	4	(0)
2014	→ Dover Athletic (loan)	10	(1)
2014–2015	→ Dover Athletic (loan)	2	(0)
2015	→ Bromley (loan)	1	(1)
2015	→ Eastleigh (loan)	1	(0)
2015–2016	Maidstone United	18	(3)
2016–2024	Folkestone Invicta	296	(6)
2024–2026	Faversham Town	46	(3)
2026–	Deal Town	16	(3)
- * Club domestic league appearances and goals as of 20 July 2026

Callum Joshua Davies (born 8 February 1993) is an English professional footballer who plays as a defender for Isthmian League South East Division club Deal Town.

== Club career ==
=== Gillingham ===
Davies started his career as a trainee with Gillingham, having captained the youth team and made a number of appearances in the reserve team. He made his debut on 13 November 2010, for Gillingham in their 3–1 home defeat to Crewe Alexandra in League Two. Davies was sent-off in the 28th minute after a professional foul on Clayton Donaldson. Gillingham manager, Andy Hessenthaler said he was in tears after being sent-off and stated "It was never a sending off. It was a very harsh decision. I am absolutely devastated for him.

==== Loan spells ====
In January 2011, Davies joined Conference South side Lewes on a one-month loan. On 29 January 2011, Davies made his Lewes debut in a 0–0 draw against St Albans City, playing the full 90 minutes. Davies went on to make nine more league appearances before returning to Gillingham.

On 25 October 2011, Davies joined Thurrock on a one-month loan. On the same day, Davies made his Thurrock debut in a 3–0 home defeat to Dartford, in which he played the full 90 minutes.

On 27 March 2014, Davies joined Dover Athletic on loan for the remainder of the 2013/14 campaign. On 5 April 2014, Davies made his Dover Athletic debut in a 2–2 draw with Bishop's Stortford, playing the full 90 minutes. On 21 April 2014, Davies scored his first professional goal in a 1–1 home draw against Whitehawk, in which he claimed the equalizer for Dover Athletic after Jake Robinson put the visitors ahead.

On 27 November 2014, Davies re-joined Dover Athletic on loan until January 2015.

On 15 August 2015, Davies joined National League side Bromley on a one-month loan. On the same day, Davies made his Bromley debut in a 4–1 defeat to Grimsby Town, in which he netted a consolation goal for Bromley.

On 22 September 2015, after struggling to make an impression at Bromley, Davies joined Eastleigh on a one-month loan. On the same day, Davies made his only Eastleigh appearance in a 5–2 defeat to former club Dover Athletic.

=== Maidstone United ===
On 23 December 2015, after a five-year senior spell with Gillingham, Davies joined National League South side Maidstone United on an 18-month deal. On 2 January 2016, Davies made his Maidstone United debut in a 2–1 victory over Margate, playing the full 90 minutes. On 27 February 2016, Davies scored his first Maidstone United goal in a 2–1 defeat against Havant & Waterlooville.

On 19 August 2016, Davies joined Folkestone Invicta on a three-month loan, which was then made permanent upon its conclusion.

=== Folkestone Invicta ===
Davies has gone on to become Folkestone Invicta captain and is a regular in the side

=== Faversham Town ===
In June 2024, Davies joined Southern Counties East Football League Premier Division club Faversham Town. In his first season, he captained the club to the title.

He departed the club in January 2026.

=== Deal Town ===
In January 2026, Davies joined Isthmian League South East Division club Deal Town.

== Career statistics ==
As of match played 30 April 2016.

Club	Season	League			FA Cup		League Cup		Other		Total	
Club	Season	Division	Apps	Goals	Apps	Goals	Apps	Goals	Apps	Goals	Apps	Goals
Gillingham	2010–11	League Two	1	0	0	0	0	0	0	0	1	0
Gillingham	2011–12	League Two	2	0	0	0	0	0	1 (Note: Appearance(s) in Football League Trophy)	0	3	0
Gillingham	2012–13	League Two	14	0	2	0	2	0	0	0	18	0
Gillingham	2013–14	League One	7	0	1	0	1	0	0	0	9	0
Gillingham	2014–15	League One	5	0	0	0	1	0	2	0	8	0
Gillingham	2015–16	League One	0	0	0	0	0	0	0	0	0	0
Gillingham	Total		29	0	3	0	4	0	3	0	39	0
Lewes (loan)	2010–11	Conference South	10	0	0	0	—		0	0	10	0
Thurrock (loan)	2011–12	Conference South	3	0	0	0	—		0	0	3	0
Dover Athletic (loan)	2013–14	Conference South	10	1	0	0	—		0	0	10	1
Dover Athletic (loan)	2014–15	Conference Premier	2	0	1	0	—		0	0	3	0
Dover Athletic (loan)	Total		12	0	1	0	—		0	0	13	0
Bromley (loan)	2015–16	National League	1	1	0	0	—		0	0	1	1
Eastleigh (loan)	2015–16	National League	1	0	0	0	—		0	0	1	0
Maidstone United	2015–16	National League South	18	3	0	0	—		0	0	18	3
Career total			156	26	5	0	0	0	9	3	170	29

== Honours ==
Gillingham

- Football League Two: 2012–13

Faversham Town

- Southern Counties East Football League Premier Division: 2024–25
