= Anthony Sinclair =

Australian rules footballer (born 1966)

Personal information
- Full name: Anthony Sinclair
- Born: 13 March 1966 (age 60)
- Original team: Glen Waverley
- Height: 181 cm (5 ft 11 in)
- Weight: 79 kg (174 lb)

Playing career^{1}
| Years | Club | Games (Goals) |
| 1985 | Sydney | 2 (1) |
- ^{1} Playing statistics correct to the end of 1985.

Anthony Sinclair (born 13 March 1966) is a former Australian rules footballer who played for the Sydney Swans in the Victorian Football League (VFL).
