= Leroy Griffiths =

English footballer

Personal information
- Full name: Leroy Henerica Septon Griffiths
- Date of birth: 30 December 1976 (age 49)
- Place of birth: Lambeth, England
- Height: 5 ft 11 in (1.80 m)
- Position: Striker

Team information
- Current team: Bedford Town

Youth career
- Sutton United

Senior career*
Years	Team	Apps	(Gls)
1995	Walton Casuals	1	(0)
1999–2001	Hampton & Richmond Borough		
2001–2003	Queens Park Rangers	36	(3)
2002	→ Farnborough Town (loan)	4	(0)
2002	→ Margate (loan)	2	(0)
2003	Farnborough Town		
2003–2005	Grays Athletic	63	(28)
2005–2007	Fisher Athletic	42	(23)
2006	→ Aldershot Town (loan)	17	(6)
2007	→ Grays Athletic (loan)	13	(2)
2007	Havant & Waterlooville	5	(1)
2007	Corinthian-Casuals	0	(0)
2007	Lewes	4	(1)
2007–2008	→ Gillingham (loan)	6	(1)
2008	Gillingham	18	(1)
2008	Eastleigh	1	(0)
2008–2011	Staines Town		
2011–2012	Sutton United	59	(20)
2012	Redhill		
2012	Thurrock	1	(1)
2013	Harrow Borough	9	(0)
2013–2014	Leatherhead		(1)
2014	Grays Athletic	19	(3)
2014	→ Hereford United (dual registration)	1	(0)
2014	Lewes	14	(2)
2015–2016	Haringey Borough		
2016	Bedford Town		
2016–2017	Harold Hill		
2017–	Bedford Town		
- * Club domestic league appearances and goals as of 11:55, 23 April 2017 (UTC)

Leroy Henerica Septon Griffiths (born 30 December 1976) is an English footballer who plays as a striker for Bedford Town.

== Career ==
Griffiths started his career at Sutton United, before short spells with Walton Casuals, Banstead and Corinthian-Casuals. He joined Hampton & Richmond Borough in February 2000, and caught the eye of professional clubs when scoring over twenty league goals in his first full season.

After being given a trial by Norwich City, Griffiths made a handful of appearances for the reserves but was not offered a permanent deal. He was later signed by Queens Park Rangers manager Ian Holloway for £40,000.

Scoring three times in 23 appearances for Rangers during the 2001–02 season, he fell out of favour at Loftus Road, and joined Farnborough Town on a three-month loan in August 2002. Returning to QPR in early November, he then joined Conference side Margate on loan in mid-November.

Upon his release in July 2003, Griffiths spent time training with Farnborough Town and signed for the club in August 2002. After just one month, he signed a two-year contract with Grays Athletic.

Despite scoring 26 times for the Gravelmen during the 2004–05 season, which saw them storm to the Conference South title and FA Trophy final, he was left out of the trophy side following a disagreement with teammate Vill Powell and club officials over a new contract.

Joining Fisher Athletic ahead of the 2005-06 campaign, he later lined-up for Aldershot Town on loan while marking his debut with a brace. Upon his return to Fisher, he was loaned to former club Grays Athletic in February 2007.

Griffiths joined Conference South side Havant & Waterlooville after his departure from Fisher, before spells with Corinthian-Casuals and Lewes. Teaming up with Mark Stimson, his former manager from Grays Athletic, he joined Gillingham on loan in November 2007, before making the move permanent in January 2008.

Leaving the club at the end of the season, he signed for non-league side Eastleigh, before a two-year spell with Staines Town. Joining the Swans in August 2008, it wasn't until January 2010 when he left Wheatsheaf Park to sign for childhood club Sutton United. Making 88 appearances in all competitions, he scored 22 goals for the U's.

He then endured a number of short spells with non-league clubs, featuring for Redhill, Thurrock, Harrow Borough and Leatherhead in the following months. A third spell with Grays Athletic in 2014 saw him dual registered with Hereford United, before he left the two clubs to return to Lewes.

Starting the 2015–16 season with Haringey Borough, he joined Bedford Town in March 2016. He started and finished the 2016–17 season at the club, but featured for Harold Hill of the 11th tier of the English football league system, midway through the campaign.
