= Stuart Thurgood =

English footballer

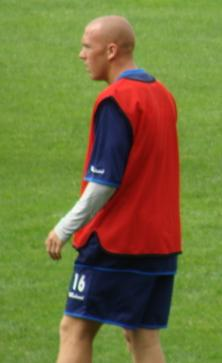

Personal information
- Full name: Stuart Anthony Thurgood
- Date of birth: 4 November 1981 (age 45)
- Place of birth: Enfield, England
- Height: 5 ft 8 in (1.73 m)
- Position: Midfielder

Youth career
- Tottenham Hotspur

Senior career*
Years	Team	Apps	(Gls)
1998–1999	Tottenham Hotspur	0	(0)
2000	Shimizu S-Pulse	0	(0)
2001–2003	Southend United	79	(1)
2003–2008	Grays Athletic	157	(26)
2007–2008	→ Gillingham (loan)	5	(0)
2008–2009	Gillingham	7	(0)
2008	→ Grays Athletic (loan)	13	(0)
2008–2009	→ Grays Athletic (loan)	27	(2)
2009	Grays Athletic	17	(1)
2009–2010	Dagenham & Redbridge	17	(0)
2011	Grays Athletic	2	(0)
2011–2012	Thurrock	26	(0)
2013–2014	East Thurrock United	20	(2)
2014	VCD Athletic	7	(1)
2016–2017	Grays Athletic	0	(0)
2017	Thurrock	0	(0)
Total		377	(33)

International career
2004–2006	England C	5	(1)
- * Club domestic league appearances and goals

Stuart Anthony Thurgood (born 4 November 1981) is an English convicted criminal and former professional footballer. He played professionally for clubs including Southend United and Gillingham. In 2021 he was convicted of drugs smuggling offences and sentenced to eight years in prison.

== Career ==
Born in Enfield, London, Thurgood made his debut for Gillingham in the 2–1 home win over Hartlepool United on 24 November 2007. He signed for Gillingham on a permanent basis in January 2008, keeping him at the club until 2009.

Thurgood rejoined Grays Athletic on 13 March 2008 on loan until the end of the 2007–08 season. He signed for Grays for a third time on 19 August 2008, on loan until the end of the 2008–09 season. This was cut short though when he was released by Gillingham on 23 January 2009, at which point he joined Grays permanently again until the end of the season. After the end of the season, in May, he joined League Two team Dagenham & Redbridge on a two-year contract.

During November 2009 he sustained an injury; in September 2010, he retired aged 28.

However, after a successful period with playing for Grays Athletic's reserve team, Thurgood signed for the Isthmian League Division One club on 11 October 2011.

In November 2011, Thurgood signed for Conference South club Thurrock, where he would return for another spell in March 2017.

During the 2013-14 season, he played for East Thurrock United and VCD Athletic.

== Imprisonment ==
In 2021, Thurgood was sentenced to eight years in prison for drugs smuggling offences. He was a member of an organised crime group which smuggled cocaine into the United Kingdom and distributed it to county lines gangs in Essex and surrounding areas.

== Honours ==
- FA Trophy: 2005, 2006
- Conference South (VI): 2005
