= Craig Weston =

Australian rugby league footballer

Personal information
- Full name: Craig Weston
- Born: 20 December 1973 (age 51)

Playing information
- Position: Wing, Centre, Five-eighth
Club
Years	Team	Pld	T	G	FG	P
1992–93	Gold Coast	31	6	20	0	64
1994	Eastern Suburbs	8	0	15	0	30
1995–96	South Queensland	14	6	1	0	26
1997–99	Huddersfield	77	36	75	0	294
2000–01	Doncaster	51	32	73	2	276
2001–04	Widnes Vikings	44	9	46	2	130
2004	Leigh Centurions	4	0	0	0	0
	Total	229	89	230	4	820

Craig Weston (born 20 December 1973) is an Australian former professional rugby league footballer who played for the Gold Coast Seagulls, the Eastern Suburbs Roosters and the South Queensland Crushers. He then moved to England, where he played for the Huddersfield Giants, Doncaster and the Widnes Vikings.

== Playing career ==
A promising junior footballer who represented the Australian Schoolboys in 1991, Weston was a talented utility and played a number of positions including wing, centre or five-eighth. Amongst his best achievements in the New South Wales Rugby League was twice scoring 16 points in a game (on both occasions from two tries and four goals) whilst playing for the Gold Coast Seagulls.

After leaving the Seagulls for unsuccessful stints at the Eastern Suburbs Roosters and South Queensland Crushers, Weston moved to England to further his playing career in the late 1990s and later joined the Widnes Vikings in 2001, helping the team to win promotion to the Super League. He was released by the club before the start of the 2003 season so he could return home to Australia due to a family illness. He re-joined the club for one final season in 2004.

== Statistics ==
Appearances and points by club, season and competition
Club	Season	Division	Appearances	Tries	Goals	Field goals	Points
Gold Coast Seagulls	1992	NSW Rugby League	9	2	14	0	36
Gold Coast Seagulls	1993	NSW Rugby League	22	4	6	0	28
Gold Coast Seagulls	Total		31	6	20	0	64
Eastern Suburbs	1994	NSW Rugby League	8	0	15	0	30
Eastern Suburbs	Total		8	0	15	0	30
South Queensland Crushers	1995	Australian Rugby League	4	1	0	0	4
South Queensland Crushers	1996	Australian Rugby League	10	5	1	0	22
South Queensland Crushers	Total		14	6	1	0	26
Huddersfield Giants	1997	RFL Division One	28	18	60	0	192
Huddersfield Giants	1998	Super League	20	5	8	0	36
Huddersfield Giants	1999	Super League	29	13	7	0	66
Huddersfield Giants	Total		77	36	75	0	294
Doncaster Dragons	2000	Northern Ford Premiership	33	26	62	2	230
Doncaster Dragons	2001	Northern Ford Premiership	18	6	11	0	46
Doncaster Dragons	Total		51	32	73	2	276
Widnes Vikings	2001	Northern Ford Premiership	12	7	45	0	118
Widnes Vikings	2002	Super League	24	2	1	2	12
Widnes Vikings	2004	Super League	8	0	0	0	0
Widnes Vikings	Total		44	9	46	2	130
Career total			225	89	230	4	820
