= Andy White (footballer, born 1991) =

English footballer

Personal information
- Full name: Andrew Jordan White
- Date of birth: 1 September 1991 (age 35)
- Place of birth: Epsom, England
- Position: Striker

Team information
- Current team: Winchester City

Youth career
- 2006–2009: Reading

Senior career*
| Years | Team | Apps | (Gls) |
| 2009–2010 | Reading | 0 | (0) |
| 2009 | → Basingstoke Town (loan) | 1 | (0) |
| 2009–2010 | → Havant & Waterlooville (loan) | 0 | (0) |
| 2010 | → Staines Town (loan) | 3 | (1) |
| 2010 | → Croydon Athletic (loan) | ? | (?) |
| 2010–2011 | Gillingham | 1 | (0) |
| 2010 | → Margate (loan) | 2 | (0) |
| 2011 | → Bishop's Stortford (loan) | 6 | (0) |
| 2011–2012 | Eastleigh | 18 | (4) |
| 2011–2012 | → Dorchester Town (loan) | 4 | (1) |
| 2012– | Winchester City | 13 | (6) |
- * Club domestic league appearances and goals as of 20:05, 11 May 2012 (UTC)

Andrew White (born 1 September 1991) is an English footballer who plays for Winchester City.

White was an apprentice at Reading, for whom he played regularly at youth and reserve levels. He had several loan spells at non-league teams, but was released by Reading at the end of the 2009–10 season, and joined Gillingham, of League Two. He made his Gillingham debut as a substitute in a League Cup fixture away to Norwich City on 10 August 2010.

After going more than two months without another appearance he was sent on one month loans to Margate in October 2010, where he was sent off on his debut appearance, and to Bishop's Stortford in January 2011. In May 2011, White was released along with seven other Gillingham players.

On 5 July 2011, White made an appearance for Eastleigh in a friendly against Winchester City and on 9 July he made his second appearance for Eastleigh against Reading, scoring a goal and claiming the Man of the Match award. White agreed terms with Eastleigh following the Reading match. On 16 December 2011, White joined Dorchester Town on a four-month loan, due to a loss of goal scoring form and increased competition for places at Eastleigh. White had his Eastleigh contract cancelled by mutual consent after his loan spell at Dorchester was terminated by the Dorset club on 27 January 2012.
