= Tom Wynter =

English footballer

Personal information
- Full name: Thomas Lenworth Wynter
- Date of birth: 20 June 1990 (age 36)
- Place of birth: Lewisham, England
- Position: Defender

Team information
- Current team: Lydd Town

Senior career*
| Years | Team | Apps | (Gls) |
| 2008–2010 | Gillingham | 8 | (0) |
| 2008–2009 | → Ramsgate (loan) | 15 | (0) |
| 2009 | → Dover Athletic (loan) | 5 | (0) |
| 2010–2015 | Dover Athletic | 69 | (0) |
| 2015–2017 | Dartford | 66 | (1) |
| 2017–2019 | Margate | | |
| 2019 | Ramsgate | 15 | (0) |
| 2019–2022 | Hythe Town | 30 | (0) |
| 2024– | Lydd Town | 10 | (0) |

Managerial career
- 2023: Lydd Town (joint-manager)
- * Club domestic league appearances and goals as of 15:56, 17 August 2017 (UTC)

Thomas Lenworth Wynter (born 20 June 1990) is an English semi-professional footballer who plays as a defender for Southern Counties East League Division One club Lydd Town.

== Career ==
Born in Ashford, Kent, Wynter joined Gillingham's youth system at under-15 level, and signed as a professional at the beginning of the 2008–09 season. After loan spells at Ramsgate and Dover Athletic, he made his league debut for Gillingham on 26 December 2009 in the home 1–0 defeat to Brentford.

Wynter rejoined former club Dover Athletic on a two-year deal in August 2010 after Gillingham decided not to renew his contract.

Wynter joined Dartford in September 2015 and became a regular at left back until leaving the club for Margate on 11 May 2017.

In June 2019, Wynter returned to Ramsgate.

In July 2021, Wynter announced his retirement, before returning to Hythe Town the following month.

In July 2023, Wynter was appointed joint-manager of Southern Counties East Football League Premier Division side Lydd Town. In August 2024, having not played a competitive fixture in two-and-a-half years due to a knee injury, Wynter made his return to playing.
