= Andy Barcham =

English association football player

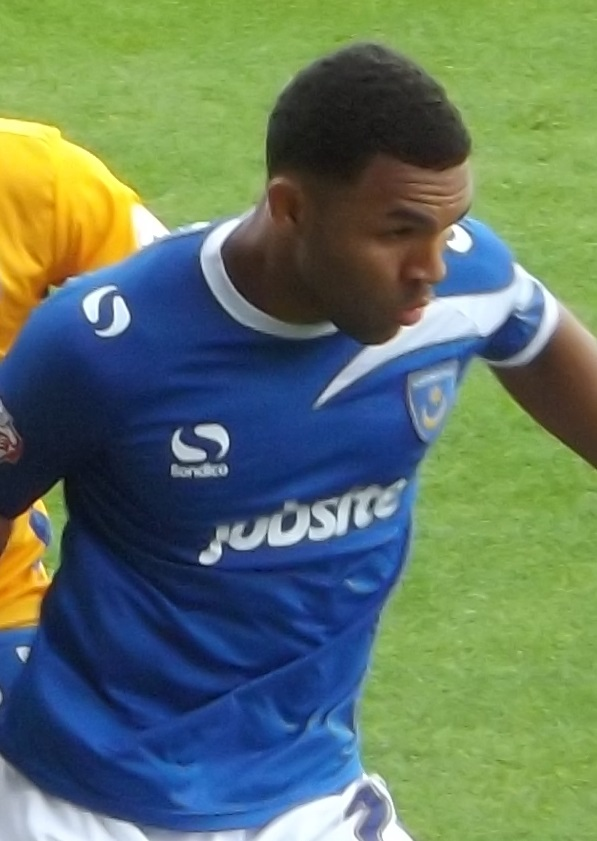
- Barcham playing for Portsmouth in 2013

Personal information
- Full name: Andrew Barcham
- Date of birth: 16 December 1986 (age 39)
- Place of birth: Basildon, England
- Height: 5 ft 9 in (1.75 m)
- Position: Winger

Youth career
- –2006: Tottenham Hotspur

Senior career*
Years	Team	Apps	(Gls)
2006–2009	Tottenham Hotspur	0	(0)
2007–2008	→ Leyton Orient (loan)	25	(1)
2008–2009	→ Gillingham (loan)	13	(2)
2009–2011	Gillingham	89	(17)
2011–2013	Scunthorpe United	75	(9)
2013–2015	Portsmouth	45	(5)
2015–2019	AFC Wimbledon	132	(15)
Total		379	(49)

International career
2002	England U16	3	(0)
- * Club domestic league appearances and goals

Andrew Barcham (born 16 December 1986) is an English professional footballer who last played for AFC Wimbledon as a winger.

== Career ==
=== Tottenham Hotspur and loan to Leyton Orient ===
Born in Basildon, Essex, Barcham became a full-time member of the Tottenham Hotspur academy, and became a professional footballer in 2005. He made 19 appearances for the reserve team, including 15 starts and scored a goal in the win against Arsenal that gave Tottenham an initiative in the title race. That season, he was also top scorer for the under-18's side, with 10 goals in 22 starts. An extremely tenacious forward, he was used predominantly on the right for Tottenham's reserves.

In November 2006, Barcham made his first team debut for the Tottenham Hotspur's in the Football League Cup win against Port Vale. In November 2007 he joined Leyton Orient on loan until the end of the season, and made his debut against Millwall.

=== Gillingham ===
Barcham joined Gillingham of League Two on 25 September 2008, originally on loan, and made his debut in a home victory against Port Vale two days later, a game in which he was named as Man of the Match. He scored his first goal for the Gills in the 2–0 home victory over Chester City, and signed for the Kent club on a six-month deal in January 2009. Barcham was named the Kent side's Player of the Season in 2009–10. He signed a two-year contract with the club that summer, but left at its conclusion in 2011.

=== Scunthorpe United ===
On 28 June, Barcham signed for League One side Scunthorpe United on a two-year deal. He made his debut on 13 August, scoring the equalising goal of a 1–1 home draw against Preston North End. He finished the season as the club's top scorer, with nine goals.

On 3 May 2013, he was released by Scunthorpe after the club was relegated to League Two.

=== Portsmouth ===
Later in the month, Barcham signed for Portsmouth on a three-year contract. He made his debut in a 4–1 home defeat to Oxford United on 3 August 2013, and scored his first goal on 24 August, in a 2–2 away draw against Mansfield Town.

=== AFC Wimbledon ===
On 1 July 2015, after rescinding his deal with Pompey, Barcham signed for AFC Wimbledon.

Barcham was released by AFC Wimbledon on 11 May 2019.

== Career statistics ==
As of match played 26 February 2018

Appearances and goals by club, season and competition
Club	Season	League		FA Cup		League Cup		Other^{1}		Total	
Club	Season	Apps	Goals	Apps	Goals	Apps	Goals	Apps	Goals	Apps	Goals
Tottenham Hotspur	2006–07	0	0	—		1	0	—		1	0
Tottenham Hotspur	2007–08	0	0	—		—		—		0	0
Tottenham Hotspur	2008–09	0	0	—		—		—		0	0
Tottenham Hotspur	Total	0	0	—		1	0	—		1	0
Leyton Orient (loan)	2007–08	25	1	—		—		—		25	1
Gillingham (loan)	2008–09	13	2	3	3	—		1	0	17	5
Gillingham	2008–09	23	4	1	0	—		—		24	4
Gillingham	2009–10	42	7	3	1	2	0	2	0	49	8
Gillingham	2010–11	24	6	—		1	0	1	0	26	6
Gillingham	Total	89	17	4	1	3	0	3	0	99	18
Scunthorpe United	2011–12	41	9	1	0	2	1	2	0	46	10
Scunthorpe United	2012–13	34	0	1	0	2	1	1	0	38	1
Scunthorpe United	Total	75	9	2	0	4	2	3	0	84	11
Portsmouth	2013–14	26	3	1	0	1	0	3	0	31	3
Portsmouth	2014–15	19	1	0	0	1	0	2	0	22	1
Portsmouth	Total	45	4	1	0	2	0	5	0	53	4
AFC Wimbledon	2015–16	33	5	0	0	1	0	4	0	38	5
AFC Wimbledon	2016–17	37	5	3	0	1	0	1	1	42	6
AFC Wimbledon	2017–18	33	4	3	0	1	0	1	0	38	4
AFC Wimbledon	Total	103	14	6	0	3	0	6	1	118	15
Career total		317	43	13	4	12	2	17	1	359	50

^{1} Including the Football League Trophy.

== Honours ==
Gillingham

- Football League Two play-offs: 2009

AFC Wimbledon

- Football League Two play-offs: 2016

Individual

- Gillingham Player of the Season: 2009–10
- AFC Wimbledon Team of the Decade (2010s)
