= Tony Sinclair (footballer) =

English footballer

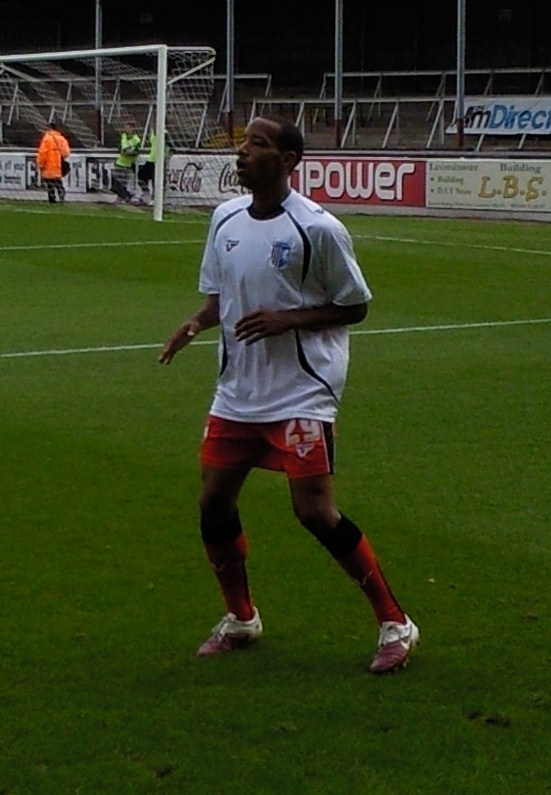

Personal information
- Full name: Tony Roy Sinclair
- Date of birth: 5 March 1985 (age 41)
- Place of birth: Lewisham, England
- Position: Defender

Team information
- Current team: Dulwich Hamlet
- Number: 13

Youth career
- 2001–2003: Gillingham

Senior career*
Years	Team	Apps	(Gls)
2004–2006	Beckenham Town		
2006–2007	Maidstone United		
2006–2007	Beckenham Town		
2006–2007	Fisher Athletic		
2007–2009	Welling United	56	(3)
2009–2010	Woking	42	(0)
2010–2011	Gillingham	20	(0)
2011–2012	Lincoln City	21	(0)
2012–2013	Carshalton Athletic	1	(0)
2012	Dulwich Hamlet	1	(0)
2013–2014	Greenwich Borough		
2013–2015	Carshalton Athletic		
2015–	Carshalton Athletic		
- * Club domestic league appearances and goals

Tony Roy Sinclair (born 5 March 1985) is an English footballer who plays for Carshalton Athletic as a defender.

== Career ==
Sinclair began his career in the youth structure at Gillingham, starting the first year of his scholarship in July 2001 and departing at the end of two years in 2003.

In the summer of 2006, he joined Maidstone United from Beckenham Town. However, he failed to appear for the club's opening Isthmian League Division One South fixture at Hastings United on 17 August 2006 and following discussions with him, on 21 August 2006 the club decided they no longer required his services.

Sinclair signed a one-year contract with Gillingham in July 2010 after impressing on trial, returning to the club where he was a trainee as a teenager. He has also spent time on the books of Beckenham Town, Fisher Athletic, Woking and Welling United. Sinclair made his debut for Gillingham on 7 August 2010, in a home 1–1 draw against Cheltenham Town.

In July 2011, Sinclair was released by Gillingham and signed a one-year deal with Conference National side Lincoln City.

After a spell at Carshalton Athletic, Sinclair made his debut for Dulwich Hamlet in the 5-0 Isthmian League defeat at Maidstone United on 13 October 2012. Unfortunately, just four days later, he was forced to limp off injured after only 12 minutes of his second game, a 2-1 Ishmian League Cup victory at Eastbourne Borough. The injury was diagnosed as a ruptured meniscus and would keep him out of action for the remainder of the season.
