= Simon King (footballer) =

English footballer

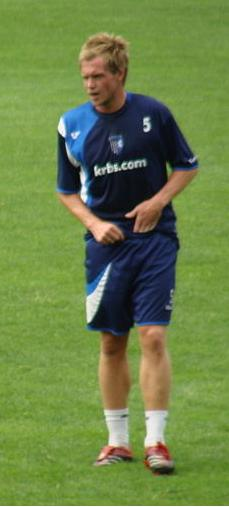

Personal information
- Full name: Simon Daniel Roy King
- Date of birth: 11 April 1983 (age 43)
- Place of birth: Oxford, England
- Position: Defender

Senior career*
Years	Team	Apps	(Gls)
2000–2003	Oxford United	4	(0)
2003–2007	Barnet	151	(6)
2007–2012	Gillingham	101	(3)
2011	→ Plymouth Argyle (loan)	6	(0)
2012–2013	Inverness Caledonian Thistle	4	(0)
2013–2015	Thurrock	48	(1)
Total		314	(10)

International career
2004–2005	England C	3	(1)
- * Club domestic league appearances and goals

Simon Daniel Roy King (born 11 April 1983) is an English retired footballer who played as a defender.

== Career ==
=== Oxford United ===
King started his career with Oxford United and made his debut on 1 May 2001 against Port Vale in the last competitive match to be played at the Manor Ground. He would leave the club having made just four appearances.

=== Barnet ===
King signed for Conference side Barnet in 2003. While with the club he would win the league title in 2004–05.

King was transfer listed by Barnet at the end of the 2006–07 season, for which he was named player of the year, to avoid him leaving on a free transfer a year later.

=== Gillingham ===
He was signed by League Two side Gillingham for £200,000 on a three-year deal in June 2007. This fee could however rise to £250,000, depending on appearances and whether Gillingham were to achieve promotion to the Football League Championship.

King made his debut as a 62nd minute substitute for Aaron Brown on the first day of the 2007–08 season against Cheltenham Town, but was on the wrong end of a 1–0 defeat.

The following season King would achieve promotion with the Kent side, playing the full 90 minutes as they defeated Shrewsbury Town 1–0 in the 2009 League Two play-off final, a game in which he was named Man of the Match. He was named Gillingham's Player of the Year for the season as well as being voted into the Professional Footballers' Association League Two team of the year.

On 3 July 2009, King signed a new three-year contract, keeping him at the club until the summer of 2012. However, during a pre-season friendly against Bromley, King suffered an ankle injury which kept him out of the entire 2009–10 season. The injury also carried over to the beginning of the 2010–11 season. King finally returned to training in November 2010 after 18 months out, with the last professional game he played in having been the 2009 League Two play-off final.

The return from injury for King was short lived however, after suffering a setback during training which caused the length on the sidelines to be extended for a few weeks. On 8 February 2011, King finally made his return to football after 18 months without playing after replacing Matt Lawrence in the 25th minute in the 3–1 home win against Rotherham United.

==== Loan to Plymouth Argyle ====
He joined Plymouth Argyle on loan for one month on 31 August 2011, and made his debut in a 2–1 defeat at Burton Albion on 3 September. He made two further appearances before the loan was extended until 7 November.

=== Inverness Caledonian Thistle ===
Following his release by Gillingham in May 2012, King agreed to sign for Inverness Caledonian Thistle in July 2012.

He made his debut for the side on the opening day of the 2012–13 Premier League season in 2–2 draw against St Mirren.

King was forced to retire from professional football after failing to recover from an injury sustained playing for Inverness.

=== Thurrock ===
King signed for Isthmian League Division One North club Thurrock on 23 August 2013, reuniting with Mark Stimson, his former manager at Gillingham.

== International career ==
King won three caps for the England non-league team, scoring the winning goal on his debut against Italy on 11 November 2004.

== Honours ==
Barnet

- Football Conference: 2004–05

Gillingham

- Football League Two play-offs: 2009

Individual

- PFA Team of the Year: 2006–07 Football League One, 2008–09 Football League Two
- Barnet Player of the Season: 2006–07
- Gillingham Player of the Season: 2008–09
