= Dennis Oli =

English footballer (born 1984)

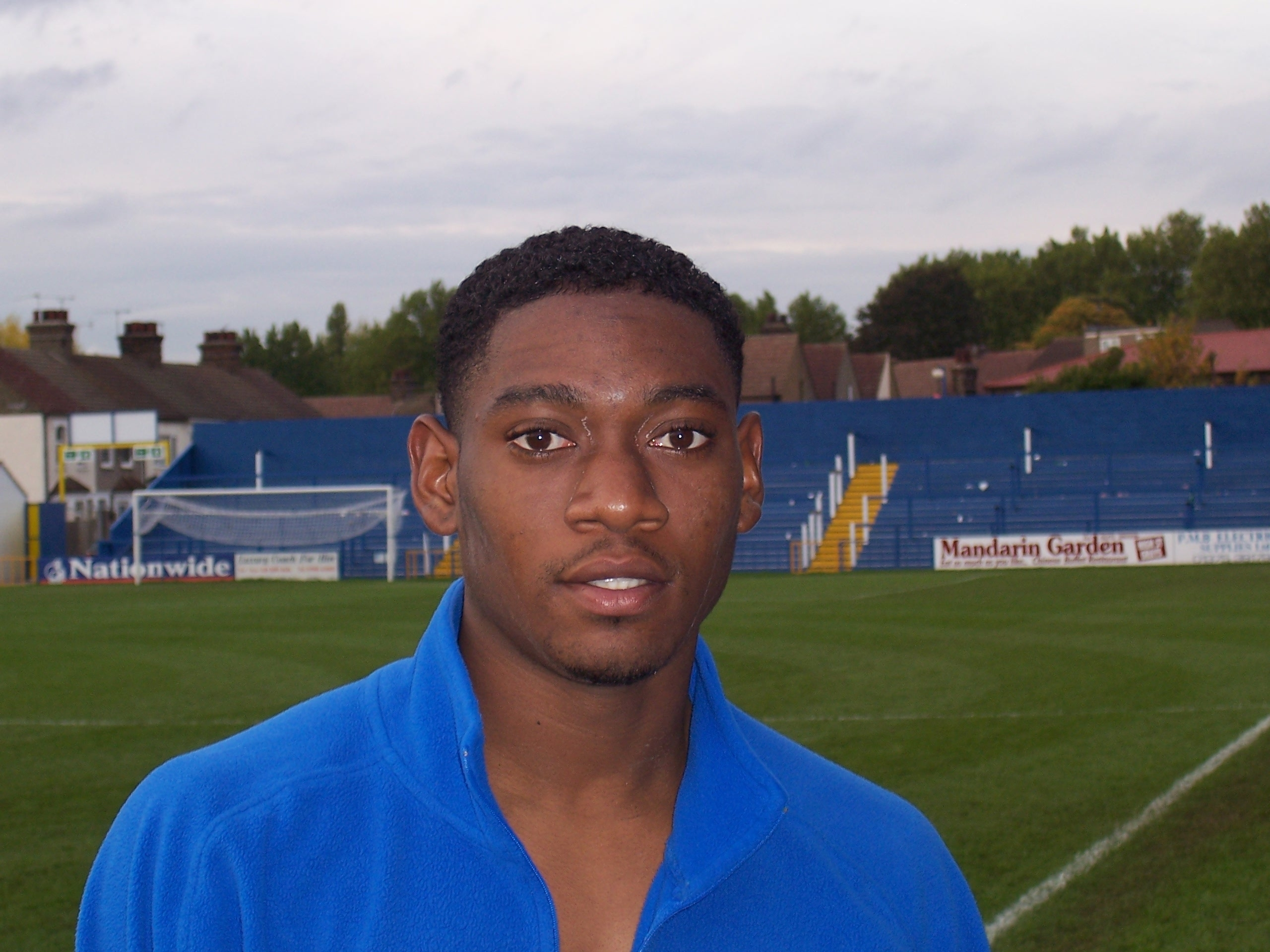
- Oli in 2006

Personal information
- Full name: Dennis Chiedozie Oli
- Date of birth: 28 January 1984 (age 42)
- Place of birth: Newham, England
- Height: 6 ft 1 in (1.85 m)
- Positions: Striker; winger

Youth career
- 2000–2001: Queens Park Rangers

Senior career*
Years	Team	Apps	(Gls)
2000–2004	Queens Park Rangers	23	(0)
2003–2004	→ Gravesend & Northfleet (loan)	5	(0)
2004	→ Farnborough Town (loan)	4	(0)
2004	Swansea City	1	(0)
2004	Cambridge United	4	(1)
2005–2008	Grays Athletic	135	(40)
2007–2008	→ Gillingham (loan)	6	(2)
2008–2012	Gillingham	148	(27)
2012–2013	Wycombe Wanderers	10	(0)
2013–2014	Havant & Waterlooville	33	(8)
2014–2016	Hemel Hempstead Town	40	(13)
2016–2017	Farnborough	37	(11)
2017	Thurrock	14	(6)
2017–2018	Kingstonian	7	(1)
2018–2019	Grays Athletic	35	(4)
Total		502	(113)

International career
2005–2006	England C	4	(1)
- * Club domestic league appearances and goals

Dennis Chiedozie Oli (born 28 January 1984) is an English former footballer who played as a striker or winger. He played for Queens Park Rangers, Gravesend & Northfleet, Farnborough Town, Swansea City, Cambridge United, Grays Athletic, Gillingham, Wycombe Wanderers, Havant & Waterlooville, Hemel Hempstead Town, Farnborough, Thurrock, Kingstonian, and Grays Athletic.

== Career ==
Oli was born in Newham, England. He came through the youth system at Queens Park Rangers and made his debut in a 1–1 draw with Wigan Athletic in February 2002. He made 23 league appearances for Queen Park Rangers but was sent on loan to Gravesend & Northfleet in November 2003 to gain more first-team experience. This was followed by a one-month loan to Farnborough Town in February 2004. He joined Swansea City on a free transfer in August 2004 but made only one appearance before leaving at the end of the month. He joined Cambridge United on a one-month deal in September 2004 after impressing during a short trial spell. He made four appearances, scoring one goal against Mansfield, for Cambridge but chose to leave at the end of his one-month contract in October 2004.

Oli joined Grays Athletic and made 28appearances in the remainder of the 2004–05 season as Grays won promotion to the Conference National as Conference South champions and won the FA Trophy. He made a further 46 appearances for Grays in the 2005–06 season as Grays reached the promotion playoffs and won the FA Trophy for a second year, when he scored the opening goal in the 2–0 victory over Woking. He made 48 league and cup appearances in the 2006–07 season as Grays finished above the relegation places, and signed a new two-year contract with Grays in May 2007.

Former Grays manager, Mark Stimson, signed Oli for Gillingham on loan in November 2007 with a view to a permanent move in January 2008. Oli made his Gillingham debut in a Football League Trophy southern section quarter final at home to Dagenham & Redbridge, scoring his first goal rounding off the 4–0 win on 13 November 2007. He signed a permanent contract at Gillingham in January 2008, keeping him at the club until 2010, and in that time, he helped Gillingham win the League Two play-off final at Wembley Stadium.

In July 2012, Oli joined Wycombe Wanderers on a one-year deal, but was released a year later after not being offered a new contract. He then signed for Havant & Waterlooville of the Conference South.

Ahead of the 2017–18 season, Oli once again joined Mark Stimson signing for Thurrock.

== Honours ==
Grays Athletic

- Conference South: 2004–05
- FA Trophy: 2004–05, 2005–06

Gillingham

- Football League Two play-offs: 2009
