= Luis Cumbers =

English footballer

Personal information
- Full name: Luis Cosme Cumbers
- Date of birth: 6 September 1988 (age 38)
- Place of birth: Chelmsford, England
- Height: 1.83 m (6 ft 0 in)
- Position: Striker

Team information
- Current team: Margate

Youth career
- ?–2007: Gillingham

Senior career*
Years	Team	Apps	(Gls)
2007–2010	Gillingham	14	(1)
2007	→ Maidstone United (loan)	9	(6)
2007–2008	→ Grays Athletic (loan)	5	(2)
2008	→ AFC Wimbledon (loan)	7	(4)
2009	→ Ebbsfleet United (loan)	2	(1)
2009	→ Ebbsfleet United (loan)	6	(1)
2009	→ AFC Wimbledon (loan)	4	(1)
2010	→ Dover Athletic (loan)	4	(0)
2010–2014	Welling United		
2014–2017	Tonbridge Angels		
2017–????	Margate		
- * Club domestic league appearances and goals as of 10:44, 31 August 2010 (UTC)

Luis Cosme Cumbers (born 6 September 1988 in Chelmsford) is an English footballer.

== Club career ==
Cumbers made his professional debut as a substitute in Gillingham's 2–0 home defeat against Yeovil Town on 5 May 2007.

In September 2007 he was loaned to Maidstone United and scored the winning goal on his debut in a 2–1 win over Tonbridge Angels. On 21 November he was recalled from Maidstone, where he had scored 11 goals in 13 matches, and immediately loaned out to Grays Athletic, where he scored on his debut away to Aldershot Town.

On 8 January 2008, Cumbers was recalled from Grays to Gillingham, but was loaned to AFC Wimbledon on 8 February 2008 to gain further first team experience.

Cumbers made his debut for AFC Wimbledon on 9 February 2008 in the 2–0 win over Harrow Borough, going on to score four goals in his short time with the Dons, before being called back by Gillingham to cover for injuries to the first team. He was allowed to return to Wimbledon on loan on transfer deadline day and helped them win promotion to the Conference South via the Isthmian League Premier Division play-offs. Cumbers scored in both the play-off semi-final and final.

Cumbers scored his first goal for Gillingham on 15 November 2008, the fourth in a 4–0 victory over Rotherham United.

On 13 March 2009, Cumbers signed for Ebbsfleet United on a month's loan. He re-joined the club on loan again the following season on 18 September, and in November 2009 rejoined AFC Wimbledon on a one-month loan. In February 2010, Cumbers went out on another loan deal, this time joining Dover Athletic until the end of the season. Cumbers had previously featured for the Conference South side in a pre-season friendly against Sittingbourne. In the summer of 2010, Cumbers' contract at Gillingham was not renewed and he signed for Welling United. In 2014, he signed for Tonbridge Angels, before moving to Margate in 2017.
