= Mark Bentley =

English footballer (born 1978)

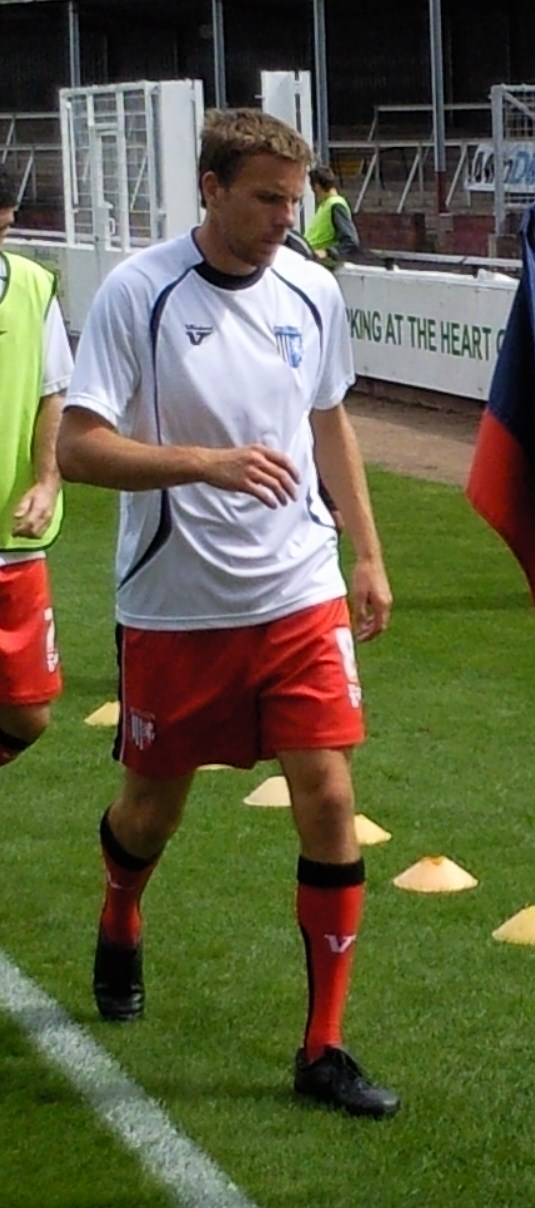
- Bentley in 2010

Personal information
- Full name: Mark James Bentley
- Date of birth: 7 January 1978 (age 48)
- Place of birth: Hertford, England
- Positions: Midfielder; defender

Team information
- Current team: Southend United (first team coach)

Senior career*
Years	Team	Apps	(Gls)
- Aveley
1998–1999	Enfield	26	(2)
1999–2002	Aldershot Town	81	(15)
2002–2003	Gravesend & Northfleet	27	(7)
2003–2004	Dagenham & Redbridge	25	(6)
2004–2006	Southend United	93	(12)
2006–2011	Gillingham	175	(11)
2011	→ Cambridge United (loan)	6	(1)
2011–2013	Hayes & Yeading United	53	(3)
2013	Boreham Wood	5	(0)
2013–2014	Wealdstone	10	(1)
2014–2016	Grays Athletic	39	(2)
Total		540	(61)

Managerial career
- 2015: Grays Athletic (player-caretaker manager)
- 2015–2016: Grays Athletic (player-manager)
- 2018–2021: Canvey Island
- * Club domestic league appearances and goals

Mark James Bentley (born 7 January 1978) is an English former professional footballer who was most recently a first-team coach at Southend United.

== Playing career ==
Born in Hertford, Bentley started his playing career with Aveley before moving on to Enfield in August 1998. He later moved to Aldershot Town, Gravesend & Northfleet (where he won Player of the Year in 2002–03) and Dagenham & Redbridge. On 15 January 2004, he stepped up into The Football League when he signed for Southend United, where he made 93 league appearances including 23 as a sub. He also scored 12 league goals including five in his last season at Roots Hall and was involved in two consecutive promotions. He was offered a new one-year contract to stay at Southend, but opted to go for the security of a two-year deal at Gillingham, signing for them on 22 May 2006. He made his debut in the 2–1 home win over Huddersfield Town on 5 August and scored his first goal away to Bradford City in a 4–2 defeat on 12 August.

Bentley was runner up in the club's 2006–07 player of the year award behind Andrew Crofts and signed a two-year contract extension in September 2007. After coming second in the Player of the Year awards for the 2009–10 season, he signed a new one-year contract for new manager Andy Hessenthaler with a clause stating that if he played a certain number of games it would be extended for another season, taking him to the end of the 2011–12 season. In March 2011, Bentley signed for Conference National club Cambridge United on a one-month loan from Gillingham. On 11 May 2011, Bentley was released by Gillingham after serving five seasons with the club, after the club failed to gain promotion from League Two. He subsequently joined Hayes & Yeading United. Following Jamie Hand's departure to Luton Town in early September, Bentley was appointed club captain.

In June 2013, Bentley signed for Conference South club Boreham Wood. Bentley signed for Wealdstone in October 2013, to help with the club's push for promotion to the Conference South. Bentley left the club by mutual consent, having made ten league appearances, in the summer of 2014.

== Coaching career ==
Bentley was appointed as player and assistant-manager alongside his role as a coach at Grays Athletic following the departure of manager Jody Brown and a number of coaches. He was then promoted to player/caretaker-manager in January 2015, before being given the job until the end of the 2014–15 season. Bentley received widespread attention in March 2015 when he put himself on as a substitute in a game: he both scored and saved a penalty kick, helping turn a 2–0 deficit into a 3–2 win.

On 1 October 2018, Bentley was appointed as the new head coach of Canvey Island.

On 20 October 2021, Bentley was appointed as a first-team coach at former club Southend United with his former teammate Kevin Maher being appointed as head coach. At the time of leaving Canvey Island, his side were top of the Isthmian Premier Division North. On 19 May 2026, Bentley, Maher and fellow coach Darren Currie were sacked by Southend following a review of the 2025–26 season.

== Honours ==
Southend United

- Football League One: 2005–06
- Football League Two play-offs: 2005
- Football League Trophy runner-up: 2004–05

Gillingham

- Football League Two play-offs: 2009
