= 2007 FA Trophy final =

2007 FA Trophy Final
- Event: 2006–07 FA Trophy
Kidderminster Harriers	Stevenage Borough
2	3
- Date: 12 May 2007
- Venue: Wembley Stadium, London
- Referee: Chris Foy
- Attendance: 53,262

The 2007 FA Trophy Final was the 38th final of The Football Association's cup competition for levels 5–8 of the English football league system. It was contested by Kidderminster Harriers and Stevenage Borough, both of the Conference National — the highest tier of the non-league football pyramid.

The game was the first competitive match, and final, to be played at the new Wembley Stadium. It was played in front of a record competition crowd of 53,262 on 12 May 2007. Stevenage won the match 3–2, despite having trailed by two goals at half-time. The victory meant it was the first time Stevenage had won the competition, as well as the club becoming the first team to win a competitive match at the new stadium. Stevenage captain Ronnie Henry subsequently became the first ever player to lift a competitive trophy at the new stadium as a result of the victory. It also meant Stevenage manager Mark Stimson had won the competition for three consecutive years, having won the FA Trophy with Grays Athletic in 2005 and 2006 respectively.

== Route to the final ==
=== Kidderminster Harriers ===
Kidderminster Harriers entered the 2006–07 FA Trophy at the First round stage, being drawn against Conference North side Vauxhall Motors. The game was played on 16 December 2006, finishing in a 4–4 draw at Aggborough. Kidderminster had raced into a three-goal lead, all three goals coming in the opening thirty minutes of the match, from James Constable, Alex Russell, and Iyseden Christie respectively. However, Vauxhall were level ten minutes into the second-half, scoring three quick-fire goals of their own. The home side then took the advantage once again through substitute Luke Reynolds. With Kidderminster defending their one-goal lead, Vauxhall's Lee Furlong scored an injury-time goal with a "thunderous drive" to ensure the game went to a replay. The replay, scheduled for 19 December, was postponed due to a frozen pitch. It was eventually played on 6 January 2007, with Kidderminster winning the game 4–0, with James Constable getting a hat-trick in the game. A 1–0 victory away at fellow Conference National side Exeter City followed in the Second Round a week later, with a first-half Iyseden Christie strike settling the match. The win meant that Kidderminster faced a home tie against Conference South side Braintree Town in the Third Round, drawing the game 0–0. Kidderminster won the replay 3–1. Despite having trailed to a first-half strike from Russ Edwards, Kidderminster hit back with three goals in four minutes to win the tie and progress to the Fourth Round. They secured a place in the semi-finals thanks to a 3–1 victory over Halifax Town on 24 February. Similarly to the victory at Braintree, Kidderminster had trailed at half-time courtesy of a late first-half goal – this time Halifax's Neal Trotman heading past the outstretched Scott Bevan. Kidderminster bounced back immediately in the second-half, with James Constable scoring his sixth goal of the tournament when he tapped in from close range after Michael Blackwood's initial shot had been saved. Goals from Gavin Hurren, and an injury-time strike from Russell Penn ensured a two-goal victory.

Kidderminster then faced Conference National side Northwich Victoria in the semi-finals, to be played over two legs. The first leg was played at Aggborough on 10 March 2007, with the home side securing a 2–0 lead to take into the second leg. Gavin Hurren scored the opening goal of the match after Mark Creighton's powerful effort was palmed into Hurren's path. Shortly before the interval, Kidderminster doubled their advantage when James Constable prodded home Alex Russell's through pass, ensuring Kidderminster took a two-goal advantage ahead of their trip to Northwich's Victoria Stadium. In the second leg, played a week later, on 17 March, Northwich made light work of their two-goal deficit by scoring two goals in the opening fifteen minutes to tie the game at 2–2. However, goals from Mark Creighton and Russell Penn ensured Kidderminster regained their two-goal aggregate advantage. A late Michael Carr penalty ensured Northwich won the game 3–2, but lost the tie 4–3 on aggregate, meaning Kidderminster had earned a place in the final.

Date	Home team	Score	Away team	Venue

16 December 2006 First Round	Kidderminster Harriers	4–4	Vauxhall Motors	Aggborough, Kidderminster
15:00	Constable 19'; Russell 23'; Christie 30'; Reynolds 74'		Furlong 42', 90'; Field 54'; McMahon 56'	Attendance: 984

6 January 2007 First Round replay	Vauxhall Motors	0–4	Kidderminster Harriers	Rivacre Park, Ellesmere Port
19:45			Constable 39', 82', 89'; White 90'	Attendance: 257

13 January 2007 Second Round	Exeter City	0–1	Kidderminster Harriers	St James Park, Exeter
15:00			Christie 31'	Attendance: 2,418

3 February 2007 Third Round	Kidderminster Harriers	0–0	Braintree Town	Aggborough, Kidderminster
15:00				Attendance: 1,543

6 February 2007 Third Round replay	Braintree Town	1–3	Kidderminster Harriers	Cressing Road, Braintree
19:45	Edwards 43'		Blackwood 71'; Constable 73'; Russell 75'	Attendance: 508

24 February 2007 Fourth Round	Kidderminster Harriers	3–1	Halifax Town	Aggborough, Kidderminster
15:00	Constable 51'; Hurren 57'; Penn 90'		Trotman 45'	Attendance: 1,580

10 March 2007 Semi-final, First leg	Kidderminster Harriers	2–0	Northwich Victoria	Aggborough, Kidderminster
15:00	Hurren 37'; Constable 45'			Attendance: 2,383

17 March 2007 Semi-final, Second leg	Northwich Victoria	3–2; Agg. 3–4	Kidderminster Harriers	Victoria Stadium, Northwich
15:00	Shaw 11'; Roca 14'; Carr 90' (pen.)		Creighton 25'; Penn 71'	Attendance: 2,129

=== Stevenage Borough ===
Stevenage Borough entered the 2006–07 FA Trophy at the First round stage, facing Merthyr Tydfil at Broadhall Way. Stevenage won the game 7–0, their biggest victory of the season, with George Boyd scoring four of the goals – three of which were scored in four second-half minutes. Goals from Steve Morison, Steve Guppy and substitute Craig Dobson completed the scoring. The club were drawn another home tie, to be played on 13 January 2007, this time against Leigh RMI. The visitors took the lead in the first-half, but Stevenage replied with three goals, one from Jamie Slabber and two from Steve Morison, to win the match 3–1. Stevenage then faced a Conference National side in the form of Morecambe, with the game being played on 2 February at Christie Park. Steve Morison gave the away side the lead in the first-half, finishing from an acute angle. Morecambe equalised in injury-time of the second-half, Garry Thompson netting from the penalty spot to ensure the tie went to a replay. Four days later, the teams faced each other in the replay, played at Broadhall Way. Stevenage won the game 3–0 after the game had gone to extra-time. Steve Morison, with his fifth of the competition, Jon Nurse, and Adam Miller scored Stevenage's goals. Another 3–0 victory followed in the quarter-final of the competition, with Stevenage beating Conference South leaders Salisbury City. Daryl McMahon's deflected effort gave the hosts the lead, before Morison and Nurse rounded off the scoring.

The victory meant that Stevenage would play Grays Athletic in the semi-final, to be played over two legs. The first leg took place on 10 March, with Grays hosting Stevenage at the New Recreation Ground. The game ended 1–0 to Stevenage thanks to a Santos Gaia header in the second-half. A week later, the second leg took place at Broadhall Way. An Alex Rhodes goals four minutes into the second-half tied the scores at 1–1 on aggregate, with the game going to extra-time after Stevenage goalkeeper Alan Julian made a number of saves to keep Stevenage in the game. Stevenage scored seven minutes into extra-time through a Mark Hughes free-kick that evaded everyone – meaning Stevenage led 2–1 on aggregate. Steve Morison netted his seventh of the competition in the 120th minute to seal Stevenage's victory and ensure the club would be participating in the first competitive final at the new Wembley Stadium.

Date	Home team	Score	Away team	Venue

16 December 2006 First Round	Stevenage Borough	7–0	Merthyr Tydfil	Broadhall Way, Stevenage
15:00	Boyd 30', 50', 51', 54'; Morison 56'; Guppy 73'; Dobson 85'			Attendance: 881

13 January 2007 Second Round	Stevenage Borough	3–1	Leigh RMI	Broadhall Way, Stevenage
15:00	Slabber 25'; Morison 68', 85'		McCauley 32'	Attendance: 1,184

2 February 2007 Third Round	Morecambe	1–1	Stevenage Borough	Christie Park, Morecambe
15:00	Thompson 90'		Morison 25'	Attendance: 1,131

6 February 2007 Third Round replay	Stevenage Borough	3–0 (After extra-time)	Morecambe	Broadhall Way, Stevenage
19:45	Morison 95'; Nurse 103'; Miller 114'			Attendance: 1,056

24 February 2007 Fourth Round	Stevenage Borough	3–0	Salisbury City	Broadhall Way, Stevenage
15:00	McMahon 24'; Morison 63'; Slabber 88'			Attendance: 2,184

10 March 2007 Semi-final, First leg	Grays Athletic	0–1	Stevenage Borough	New Recreation Ground, Grays
15:00			Gaia 72'	Attendance: 1,918

17 March 2007 Semi-final, Second leg	Stevenage Borough	2–1 (After extra-time); Agg. 3–1	Grays Athletic	Broadhall Way, Stevenage
15:00	Hughes 97'; Morison 120'		Rhodes 49'	Attendance: 3,008

== Match summary ==
The two teams were competing for the FA Trophy, a cup competition open to clubs playing in steps 1–4 of the National League System. The match had garnered a lot of media attention due to the fact that it was the first competitive game to be played at the new Wembley Stadium, which opened in May 2007. The attendance of 53,262 means that the final holds the record for the highest attendance for any FA Trophy final, beating the previous record of 34,842, when Wycombe Wanderers beat Kidderminster in 1991. The winning club received the FA Trophy itself, and prize money of £50,000, in addition to that accumulated for winning earlier rounds, whilst the runners-up received prize money of £25,000. Stevenage manager Mark Stimson was hoping to win the competition for a third consecutive year, having won the trophy for Grays Athletic in 2006 and 2007 respectively.

Both teams were at full strength for the match. The line-ups included Stevenage's Steve Guppy and Kidderminster's Jeff Kenna, meaning the two players were the first to play at both old and new Wembley stadia. Stevenage striker Steve Morison had scored a total of seven goals in seven games en route to the final, and he was joint leading goalscorer of the tournament prior to the final, alongside Kidderminster's James Constable, who had netted seven goals in eight games. Kidderminster's Stuart Whitehead captained the side, whilst long-serving Ronnie Henry wore the captain's armband for Stevenage.

=== First-half ===
The first-half started "tentatively", with Kidderminster looking the more likely side as the half progressed — "controlling the midfield, and taking advantage of a deep-sitting Stevenage backline, Kidderminster started to find some penetration". On the half-hour mark, Kidderminster took the lead, and it was Constable who supplied the end product, when he was on hand to stab home after Iyseden Christie's shot was blocked. Five minutes later, Kidderminster doubled their advantage – after a surging run, Constable fizzed in a low shot from the edge of the box, which nestled into the corner and beat the outstretched Alan Julian in the Stevenage goal. Kidderminster leading 2–0, referee Chris Foy blew his whistle for the half-time interval.

=== Second-half ===
Despite trailing 2–0, Stevenage manager Mark Stimson opted against making any changes at the interval, whilst Kidderminster also remained unchanged. Stevenage started the second period with "much more purpose, showing greater thrust and belief", with Mitchell Cole shooting wide after a mazy run. Six minutes into the second-half, Stevenage halved the deficit, Morison headed the ball down to Mitchell Cole, who produced a neat right-footed finish to beat Scott Bevan in the Kidderminster goal. Centre-back Santos Gaia spurned the opportunity to restore parity when his header narrowly missed the target on the hour mark. Stimson brought on Craig Dobson in place of Steve Guppy after 63 minutes, and ten minutes later, Dobson levelled the scores at two-apiece. Dobson latched on to a "hopeful long punt" from John Nutter and toe poked the ball past onrushing Bevan. Kidderminster responded by making an instant change, bringing on Andrew White for Iyseden Christie. However, it was Stevenage who would go on to complete a remarkable comeback with just two minutes of the game remaining. Stevenage right-back Barry Fuller produced a swinging cross that Morison hooked towards goal on the volley, Bevan saved the shot, but Morison reacted fastest to "smash home the rebound and snatch the glory".

=== Post-match ===
After the match, the Kidderminster players and management team were the first to make the 107–step climb up the Wembley stairs to collect their runners-up medals. Stevenage, led by captain Ronnie Henry, then made the journey up the steps "cheered on by the Stevenage support", with Henry being awarded the winners' trophy from the presentation party. Substitute Craig Dobson was awarded the Man of the Match trophy, having "turned the game and caused no end of problems for the Kidderminster defence". In the post-match interviews, Kidderminster manager Mark Yates stated he was "devastated, but proud" of his players, and believed his side did not deserve to lose the match. Stevenage's manager Mark Stimson, celebrating his third consecutive FA Trophy success, told the players to "believe in themselves" at half-time, and felt that his side were always going to go on and win the match once Mitchell Cole had halved the two-goal deficit just after half-time. Steve Morison stated he was "lost for words" after scoring the winning goal in the 88th minute — "I can't explain how it feels, I can't describe scoring a goal anytime let alone at Wembley in front of 50,000 people. The boys out there were all part of it, it was a tremendous effort. I just did what I'm paid to do and that's score goals".

== Match details ==
12 May 2007
14:00 BST

Kidderminster Harriers	2–3	Stevenage Borough
Constable 31', 37'	Report	Cole 51'; Dobson 74'; Morison 88'

Wembley Stadium, London
Attendance: 53,262
Referee: Chris Foy

GK	1	(England) Scott Bevan
RB	2	(Republic of Ireland) Jeff Kenna
CB	5	(England) Mark Creighton
CB	6	(England) Stuart Whitehead (c)
LB	4	(England) Gavin Hurren (yellow card)
RM	18	(England) Brian Smikle	(substituted off) 90'
CM	12	(England) Simon Russell
CM	14	(England) Russell Penn (yellow card)
LM	11	(England) Michael Blackwood
FW	22	(England) Iyseden Christie	(substituted off) 76'
FW	26	(England) James Constable
Substitutes:
GK	13	(England) Stephen Taylor
MF	7	(England) Jacob Sedgemore
MF	17	(England) Michael McGrath
FW	9	(England) Andrew White	(substituted on) 76'
FW	14	(England) Luke Reynolds	(substituted on) 90'
Manager:
(England) Mark Yates

GK	1	(Northern Ireland) Alan Julian
RB	2	(England) Barry Fuller (yellow card)
CB	6	(Brazil) Santos Gaia
CB	25	(England) Ronnie Henry (c)
LB	3	(England) John Nutter
RM	21	(England) Steve Guppy	(substituted off) 63'
CM	26	(England) Mark Beard
CM	10	(England) Adam Miller
LM	11	(England) Mitchell Cole
FW	4	(England) Luke Oliver (yellow card)
FW	20	(Wales) Steve Morison
Substitutes:
GK	16	(England) Danny Potter
MF	22	(Jamaica) Craig Dobson	(substituted on) 63'
MF	24	(Republic of Ireland) Daryl McMahon
FW	7	(England) Jamie Slabber
FW	9	(Barbados) Jon Nurse
Manager:
(England) Mark Stimson

Match rules

- 90 minutes.
- 30 minutes of extra-time if necessary.
- Penalty shootout if scores still level.
- Five named substitutes.
- Maximum of three substitutions.
