= 2004–05 Northampton Town F.C. season =

Northampton Town
2004–05 season
- Chairman: David Cardoza
- Manager: Colin Calderwood
- Stadium: Sixfields Stadium
- League Two: 7th
- Play-offs: Semi-final
- FA Cup: Third round
- League Cup: Second round
- League Trophy: Quarter-final
- Top goalscorer: League: Scott McGleish (13); All: Scott McGleish (17)
- Highest home attendance: 7,183 vs Southampton
- Lowest home attendance: 3,280 vs Southend United

The 2004–05 season was Northampton Town's 108th season in their history and the second successive season in the fourth tier, in the newly rebranded League Two. Alongside competing in League Two, the club also participated in the FA Cup, League Cup and Football League Trophy.

== Players ==
As of match played 21 May 2005.

No.	Name	Position	Nat.	Place of Birth	Date of Birth (Age)	Apps	Goals	Previous club	Date signed	Fee
Goalkeepers
1	Lee Harper	GK	(England)	Chelsea	30 October 1971 (aged 33)	128	0	Walsall	15 July 2002	Free
13	Daniel Cross	GK	(England)	Nuneaton	5 January 1987 (aged 18)	0	0	Apprentice	21 August 2001	N/A
24	Mark Bunn	GK	(England)	Kettering	16 November 1984 (aged 20)	0	0	Apprentice	21 August 2001	N/A
Defenders
2	Luke Chambers	RB/CB	(England)	Kettering	28 September 1985 (aged 19)	65	0	Apprentice	26 April 2003	N/A
3	Tommy Jaszczun	LB	(England)	Kettering	16 September 1977 (aged 27)	38	0	Blackpool	1 July 2004	Free
4	Ashley Westwood	CB	(England)	Bridgnorth	31 August 1976 (aged 28)	32	2	Sheffield Wednesday	14 July 2003	Free
5	Chris Willmott	CB	(England)	Bedford	30 September 1977 (aged 27)	101	1	Wimbledon	14 July 2003	Free
6	Fred Murray	CB/LB	(Republic of Ireland)	Clonmel	22 May 1982 (aged 22)	44	0	Cambridge United	18 July 2004	Undisclosed
20	Pedj Bojic	RB	(Australia)	Sydney	9 April 1984 (aged 21)	42	0	Sydney Olympic	3 August 2004	Free
23	Luke Graham	RB	(England)	Kettering	27 April 1986 (aged 19)	0	0	Apprentice	1 July 2004	N/A
24	Chris Carruthers	LB	(England)	Kettering	19 August 1983 (aged 21)	89	1	Apprentice	1 August 2000	N/A
Midfielders
7	David Hunt	U	(England)	Dulwich	10 September 1982 (aged 22)	5	0	Leyton Orient	23 March 2005	Free
10	Josh Low	RM	(Wales)	Bristol (ENG)	15 February 1979 (aged 26)	81	13	Oldham Athletic	30 July 2003	£165,000
14	David Rowson	CM	(Scotland)	Aberdeen	14 September 1976 (aged 28)	43	2	Partick Thistle	1 July 2004	Free
17	Charley Hearn	CM	(England)	Ashford	11 November 1983 (aged 21)	28	1	Millwall	3 December 2004	Loan
19	Martin Smith	LM	(England)	Sunderland	13 November 1974 (aged 30)	97	25	Huddersfield Town	1 July 2003	Free
21	David Galbraith	LM	(England)	Luton	20 December 1983 (aged 21)	30	1	Tottenham Hotspur	1 July 2004	Free
22	David Hicks	CM	(England)	Enfield	13 November 1985 (aged 19)	5	0	Tottenham Hotspur	24 February 2004	Free
27	Lee Williamson	CM	(England)	Derby	7 June 1982 (aged 22)	43	2	Mansfield Town	9 September 2004	Undisclosed
28	Sam Togwell	U	(England)	Beaconsfield	14 October 1984 (aged 20)	10	0	Crystal Palace	24 March 2005	Loan
Forwards
8	Andy Kirk	FW	(Northern Ireland)	Belfast	29 May 1979 (aged 25)	10	7	Boston United	10 March 2005	£125,000
9	Marc Richards	FW	(England)	Wolverhampton	8 July 1982 (aged 22)	67	14	Blackburn Rovers	14 June 2003	Free
11	Scott McGleish	FW	(England)	Barnet	10 February 1974 (aged 31)	53	17	Colchester United	4 June 2004	Free
18	Éric Sabin	FW	(France)	Sarcelles	22 August 1975 (aged 29)	62	14	Queens Park Rangers	13 March 2004	Free
21	Scott Cross	FW	(England)	Northampton	30 October 1987 (aged 17)	1	0	Apprentice	28 December 2004	N/A

== Competitions ==
=== League Two ===
==== League table ====
Pos	Team	Pld	W	D	L	GF	GA	GD	Pts	Promotion or relegation
5	Macclesfield Town	46	22	9	15	60	49	+11	75	Qualification for League Two play-offs
6	Lincoln City	46	20	12	14	64	47	+17	72	Qualification for League Two play-offs
7	Northampton Town	46	20	12	14	62	51	+11	72	Qualification for League Two play-offs
8	Darlington	46	20	12	14	57	49	+8	72	
9	Rochdale	46	16	18	12	54	48	+6	66	

Updated to match(es) played on 15 September 2009. Source: 2004–05 League Two
Rules for classification: 1) points; 2) goal difference; 3) number of goals scored.

==== Results summary ====
Overall								Home						Away					
Pld	W	D	L	GF	GA	GD	Pts	W	D	L	GF	GA	GD	W	D	L	GF	GA	GD
46	20	12	14	62	51	+11	72	11	9	3	35	20	+15	9	3	11	27	31	−4

Source: https://www.11v11.com/teams/northampton-town/tab/leagueTables/2005/ 11v11.com

==== League position by match ====
Round	1	2	3	4	5	6	7	8	9	10	11	12	13	14	15	16	17	18	19	20	21	22	23	24	25	26	27	28	29	30	31	32	33	34	35	36	37	38	39	40	41	42	43	44	45	46
Ground	A	H	H	A	H	A	A	H	A	H	A	H	A	H	H	A	A	H	A	H	H	A	H	H	A	A	H	A	H	A	A	H	A	H	H	A	A	H	A	H	A	H	A	H	A	H
Result	W	W	D	L	D	L	L	D	D	W	D	L	W	W	W	L	L	D	W	D	W	W	W	W	L	W	D	L	D	W	D	L	W	D	W	L	L	D	W	W	L	L	L	W	W	W
Position	6	4	5	6	8	14	17	16	17	13	14	16	13	12	6	9	13	12	10	12	9	5	6	5	5	5	5	6	7	7	6	7	7	7	6	6	9	8	8	7	8	8	8	8	7	7

Source: Northampton Town F.C.
A = Away; H = Home; W = Win; D = Draw; L = Loss

==== Matches ====
Win Draw Loss

7 August 2004 1	Swansea City	0–2	Northampton Town	Swansea, Wales
15:00 BST		Report	S.McGleish 3'; S.Ricketts 82' (o.g.)	Stadium: Vetch Field; Attendance: 9,578; Referee: Mick Fletcher

10 August 2004 2	Northampton Town	1–0	Rushden & Diamonds	Northampton
19:45 BST	E.Sabin 75'	Report		Stadium: Sixfields Stadium; Attendance: 7,107; Referee: Steve Tanner

14 August 2004 3	Northampton Town	1–1	Wycombe Wanderers	Northampton
15:00 BST	M.Richards 46'; F.Murray (red card) 59'	Report	I.Stonebridge 42'	Stadium: Sixfields Stadium; Attendance: 6,049; Referee: Carl Boyeson

21 August 2004 4	Shrewsbury Town	2–0	Northampton Town	Shrewsbury
15:00 BST	J.Grant 50'; B.Smith 78'	Report	R.Amoo (red card) 27'; B.Cozic (red card) 67'	Stadium: Gay Meadow; Attendance: 3,980; Referee: Kevin Friend

28 August 2004 5	Northampton Town	2–2	Leyton Orient	Northampton
15:00 BST	M.Richards 37'; S.McGleish 65'	Report	I.Stonebridge 6', 62'	Stadium: Sixfields Stadium; Attendance: 5,577; Referee: Ray Olivier

30 August 2004 6	Scunthorpe United	2–0	Northampton Town	Scunthorpe
15:00 BST	A.Keogh 43'; A.Crosby 73' (pen.)	Report		Stadium: Glanford Park; Attendance: 4,201; Referee: Nigel Miller

5 September 2004 7	Mansfield	4–1	Northampton Town	Mansfield
15:00 BST	D.Asamoah 12'; W.Corden 44', 86'; C.Larkin 55'	Report	E.Sabin 37'	Stadium: Field Mill; Attendance: 5,173; Referee: Chris Foy

11 September 2004 8	Northampton Town	0–0	Notts County	Northampton
15:00 BST		Report		Stadium: Sixfields Stadium; Attendance: 5,471; Referee: Clive Oliver

18 September 2004 9	Darlington	1–1	Northampton Town	Darlington
15:00 BST	C.Hignett 23'	Report	S.Morison 53'	Stadium: Feethams; Attendance: 4,028; Referee: Mike Pike

11 September 2004 10	Northampton Town	2–1	Bristol Rovers	Northampton
15:00 BST	S.McGleish 4', 23'	Report	J.Hunt (red card) 25'; D.Savage 80'	Stadium: Sixfields Stadium; Attendance: 5,645; Referee: Darren Drysdale

2 October 2004 11	Yeovil Town	1–1	Northampton Town	Yeovil
15:00 BST	P.Jevons 14'	Report	E.Sabin 79'	Stadium: Huish Park; Attendance: 5,944; Referee: Mike Russell

8 October 2004 12	Northampton Town	0–1	Grimsby Town	Northampton
19:45 BST		Report	D.Gordon 86'	Stadium: Sixfields Stadium; Attendance: 5,805; Referee: Lee Mason

15 October 2004 13	Cambridge United	0–1	Northampton Town	Cambridge
19:45 BST		Report	E.Sabin 41'	Stadium: Abbey Stadium; Attendance: 4,118; Referee: Tony Bates

19 October 2004 14	Northampton Town	1–0	Oxford United	Northampton
19:45 BST	S.McGleish 83'	Report		Stadium: Sixfields Stadium; Attendance: 5,445; Referee: Fred Graham

23 October 2004 15	Northampton Town	5–1	Rochdale	Northampton
15:00 BST	D.Burgess 9' (o.g.); M.Smith 21' (pen.), 28'; N.Edwards 63' (o.g.); J.Low 90'	Report	G.Griffiths 77'	Stadium: Sixfields Stadium; Attendance: 5,342; Referee: Joe Ross

30 October 2004 16	Southend United	2–1	Northampton Town	Southend-on-Sea
15:00 BST	M.Gower 27'; W.Gray 76'	Report	E.Sabin 87'	Stadium: Roots Hall; Attendance: 5,696; Referee: Kevin Wright

6 November 2004 17	Lincoln City	3–2	Northampton Town	Lincoln
15:00 GMT	S.Yeo 54', 57'; M.Richardson 90'	Report	S.McGleish 6'; E.Sabin 38'	Stadium: Sincil Bank; Attendance: 4,808; Referee: Scott Mathieson

19 November 2004 18	Northampton Town	1–1	Chester City	Northampton
19:45 GMT	M.Smith 7'	Report	K.Ellison 26'; C.Belle (red card) 29'	Stadium: Sixfields Stadium; Attendance: 5,625; Referee: Mike Thorpe

27 November 2004 19	Kidderminster Harriers	0–2	Northampton Town	Kidderminster
15:00 GMT		Report	S.McGleish 17'; J.Alsop 76'	Stadium: Aggborough Stadium; Attendance: 2,701; Referee: Andy D'Urso

7 December 2004 20	Northampton Town	1–1	Chester City	Northampton
19:45 GMT	S.McGleish 64'	Report	D.Spencer 84'	Stadium: Sixfields Stadium; Attendance: 4,373; Referee: Paul Melin

11 December 2004 21	Northampton Town	2–1	Boston United	Northampton
15:00 GMT	M.Smith 72'; S.McGleish 86'	Report	A.Kirk 74'	Stadium: Sixfields Stadium; Attendance: 5,245; Referee: Keith Stroud

18 December 2004 22	Macclesfield Town	1–3	Northampton Town	Macclesfield
15:00 GMT	G.Potter 64'	Report	J.Low 50', 86'; C.Hearn 78'	Stadium: Moss Rose; Attendance: 2,073; Referee: Clive Oliver

28 December 2004 23	Northampton Town	2–0	Bury	Northampton
15:00 GMT	D.Rowson 40'; J.Low 73'	Report	D.Filtcroft (red card) 45'	Stadium: Sixfields Stadium; Attendance: 6,041; Referee: Andre Marriner

1 January 2005 24	Northampton Town	2–1	Mansfield Town	Northampton
13:00 GMT	T.Benjamin 53'; M.Smith 77'	Report	D.Asamoah (red card) 43'; D.Rowson 45' (o.g.)	Stadium: Sixfields Stadium; Attendance: 6,122; Referee: Andy Penn

3 January 2005 25	Bristol Rovers	3–1	Northampton Town	Bristol
15:00 GMT	J.Hunt 39'; C.Edwards 51'; J.Agogo 90'	Report	E.Sabin 88'	Stadium: Memorial Ground; Attendance: 6,961; Referee: Paul Armstrong

11 January 2005 26	Grimsby Town	1–2	Northampton Town	Cleethorpes
19:45 GMT	M.Reddy 22'; A.Sestanovich (red card) 83'	Report	S.McGleish 49'; T.Benjamin 55'	Stadium: Blundell Park; Attendance: 3,774; Referee: Paul Robinson

15 January 2005 27	Northampton Town	1–1	Darlington	Northampton
15:00 GMT	D.Galbraith 87'	Report	A.Gregorio 7'	Stadium: Sixfields Stadium; Attendance: 5,762; Referee: Andy Hall

22 January 2005 28	Bury	2–0	Northampton Town	Bury
15:00 GMT	J.Newby 22'; A.Keogh 55'	Report	T.Benjamin (red card) 62'	Stadium: Gigg Lane; Attendance: 2,687; Referee: Carl Boyeson

4 February 2005 29	Northampton Town	2–2	Cambridge United	Northampton
19:45 GMT	D.Rowson 3'; S.McGleish 82'	Report	D.Chillingworth 48', 60'	Stadium: Sixfields Stadium; Attendance: 6,615; Referee: Alan Kaye

12 February 2005 30	Oxford United	1–2	Northampton Town	Oxford
15:00 GMT	T.Mooney 58'	Report	E.Sabin 64'; S.McGleish 70'	Stadium: Kassam Stadium; Attendance: 7,032; Referee: Andy Penn

15 February 2005 31	Notts County	0–0	Northampton Town	Nottingham
19:45 GMT		Report		Stadium: Meadow Lane; Attendance: 4,645; Referee: Mike Pike
Note: Fixture was previously postponed on 26 December 2004 due to a frozen pitch.

19 February 2005 32	Northampton Town	1–2	Southend United	Northampton
15:00 GMT	M.Smith 7'	Report	A.Barrett 72', 90'	Stadium: Sixfields Stadium; Attendance: 6,602; Referee: Mike Thorpe

26 February 2005 33	Boston United	0–1	Northampton Town	Boston
15:00 GMT		Report	M.Smith 73'	Stadium: York Street; Attendance: 2,749; Referee: Howard Webb

1 March 2005 34	Northampton Town	1–1	Yeovil Town	Northampton
19:45 GMT	D.Crow 88'	Report	A.Davies 31'	Stadium: Sixfields Stadium; Attendance: 5,630; Referee: Graham Salisbury

5 March 2005 35	Northampton Town	1–0	Macclesfield Town	Northampton
15:00 GMT	D.Crow 88'	Report		Stadium: Sixfields Stadium; Attendance: 5,804; Referee: Kevin Wright

8 March 2005 36	Rochdale	1–0	Northampton Town	Rochdale
19:45 GMT	R.Lambert 56'	Report		Stadium: Spotland; Attendance: 2,107; Referee: Tony Bates

12 March 2005 37	Rushden and Diamonds	3–2	Northampton Town	Irthlingborough
15:00 GMT	P.Hawkins 7'; D.Broughton 57' (pen.); B.Sharp 90'	Report	M.Smith 45'; A.Kirk 52'	Stadium: Nene Park; Attendance: 5,520; Referee: Paul Taylor

19 March 2005 38	Northampton Town	2–2	Swansea City	Northampton
15:00 GMT	M.Smith 35'; A.Kirk 40'	Report	P.Connor 30'; L.Trundle 70'	Stadium: Sixfields Stadium; Attendance: 5,799; Referee: Keith Stroud

25 March 2005 39	Wycombe Wanderers	0–1	Northampton Town	High Wycombe
19:45 GMT		Report	S.McGleish 44'	Stadium: Adams Park; Attendance: 7,417; Referee: Jarnail Singh

28 March 2005 40	Northampton Town	2–0	Shrewsbury Town	Northampton
15:00 BST	M.Smith 16'; A.Westwood 38'	Report	S.Whitehead (red card) 90'	Stadium: Sixfields Stadium; Attendance: 6,514; Referee: Paul Armstrong

2 April 2005 41	Leyton Orient	3–2	Northampton Town	Leyton, London
15:00 BST	J.Mackie 16'; L.Steele 63', 90'	Report	A.Kirk 68'; A.Westwood 75'	Stadium: Brisbane Road; Attendance: 3,585; Referee: Clive Penton

9 April 2005 42	Northampton Town	1–2	Scunthorpe United	Northampton
15:00 BST	A.Kirk 4'	Report	P.Hayes 14'; R.Kell 21'	Stadium: Sixfields Stadium; Attendance: 6,523; Referee: Mike Russell

16 April 2005 43	Cheltenham Town	1–0	Northampton Town	Cheltenham
15:00 BST	D.Spencer 22'	Report		Stadium: Whaddon Road; Attendance: 3,689; Referee: Phil Crossley

23 April 2005 44	Northampton Town	1–0	Lincoln City	Northampton
15:00 BST	J.Low 69'	Report		Stadium: Sixfields Stadium; Attendance: 6,435; Referee: Jarnail Singh

30 April 2005 45	Chester City	0–2	Northampton Town	Chester
15:00 BST		Report	A.Kirk 22', 47'	Stadium: Deva Stadium; Attendance: 3,455; Referee: Russell Booth

7 May 2005 46	Northampton Town	3–0	Kidderminster Harriers	Northampton
15:00 BST	A.Kirk 68'; J.Low 85', 87'	Report		Stadium: Sixfields Stadium; Attendance: 6,786; Referee: Trevor Parkes

==== Play-offs ====
15 May 2005 Semi-final 1st leg	Northampton Town	0–0	Southend United	Northampton
17:15 BST		Report		Stadium: Sixfields Stadium; Attendance: 6,601; Referee: Lee Mason

21 May 2005 Semi-final 2nd leg	Southend United	1–0 (1–0 agg.)	Northampton Town	Southend-on-Sea
18:15 BST	F.Eastwood 49' (pen.)	Report		Stadium: Roots Hall; Attendance: 9,152; Referee: Barry Knight

=== FA Cup ===
13 November 2004 First round	Northampton Town	1–0	Barnsley	Northampton
15:00 GMT	S.McGleish 5'	Report		Stadium: Sixfields Stadium; Attendance: 4,876; Referee: Steve Tanner

4 December 2004 Second round	Northampton Town	1–0	Bury	Northampton
13:00 GMT	S.McGleish 23'	Report		Stadium: Sixfields Stadium; Attendance: 4,415; Referee: Paul Taylor

5 January 2005 Third round	Northampton Town	1–3	Southampton	Northampton
15:00 GMT	L.Williamson 30'	Report	K.Phillips 29'; P.Crouch 41'; J.Redknapp 53'	Stadium: Sixfields Stadium; Attendance: 7,183; Referee: Mike Jones

=== League Cup ===
24 August 2004 First round	Gillingham	1–2	Northampton Town	Gillingham
19:45 BST	M.Sidibe 56'	Report	E.Sabin 32'; S.McGleish 41'	Stadium: Priestfield; Attendance: 3,108; Referee: Joe Ross

22 September 2004 Second round	Northampton Town	0–3	Southampton	Northampton
19:45 BST		Report	K.Phillips 32'; D.Prutton 35'; N.McCann 65'	Stadium: Sixfields Stadium; Attendance: 6,343; Referee: Howard Webb

=== League Trophy ===
2 November 2004 Second round (s)	Torquay United	1–3	Northampton Town	Torquay
19:45 GMT	T.Bedeau 54'	Report	J.Alsop 6'; L.Williamson 70'; S.McGleish 76'	Stadium: Plainmoor; Attendance: 1,395; Referee: Clive Penton

30 November 2004 Quarter-final (s)	Northampton Town	0–2	Southend United	Northampton
19:45 GMT		Report	L.Dudfield 14'; C.Pettefer 21'	Stadium: Sixfields Stadium; Attendance: 3,280; Referee: Grant Hegley

=== Appearances, goals and cards ===
No.	Pos	Player	League Two			FA Cup			League Cup			League Trophy			Play-offs			Total			Discipline	
No.	Pos	Player	Starts	Sub	Goals	Starts	Sub	Goals	Starts	Sub	Goals	Starts	Sub	Goals	Starts	Sub	Goals	Starts	Sub	Goals	Booked	Sent off (straight red)
1	GK	Lee Harper	36	–	–	3	–	–	1	–	–	2	–	–	2	–	–	44	–	–	–	–
2	RB	Luke Chambers	19	8	–	1	1	–	1	1	–	1	1	–	2	–	–	24	11	–	5	–
3	LB	Tommy Jaszczun	24	8	–	3	–	–	2	–	–	1	–	–	–	–	–	30	8	–	3	–
4	CB	Ashley Westwood	19	–	2	1	1	–	–	–	–	–	–	–	–	–	–	20	1	2-	3	–
5	CB	Chris Willmott	45	–	–	3	–	–	2	–	–	2	–	–	2	–	–	54	–	–	9	–
6	LB	Fred Murray	38	–	–	2	–	–	–	–	–	2	–	–	2	–	–	44	–	–	5	1
7	U	David Hunt	2	2	–	–	–	–	–	–	–	–	–	–	–	1	–	2	2	–	–	–
8	ST	Andy Kirk	8	–	7	–	–	–	–	–	–	–	–	–	2	–	–	10	–	7	2	–
9	ST	Marc Richards	8	4	2	–	–	–	1	–	–	–	1	–	–	–	–	9	5	2	–	–
10	RM	Josh Low	33	1	7	2	1	–	2	–	–	–	–	–	2	–	–	39	2	7	2	–
11	ST	Scott McGleish	43	1	13	3	–	2	2	–	1	2	–	1	2	–	–	52	1	17	6	–
12	LB	Chris Carruthers	–	1	–	–	–	–	–	1	–	–	1	–	–	–	–	–	3	–	–	–
13	GK	Mark Bunn	–	–	–	–	–	–	–	–	–	–	–	–	–	–	–	–	–	–	–	–
14	CM	David Rowson	35	2	2	3	–	–	–	–	–	1	–	–	2	–	–	41	2	2	4	–
17	CM	Charley Hearn	21	3	1	1	1	–	–	–	–	–	–	–	2	–	–	24	4	1	9	–
18	ST	Eric Sabin	28	12	8	2	1	–	2	–	1	–	2	–	–	2	–	32	17	9	3	–
19	ST	Martin Smith	31	3	10	3	–	–	–	–	–	1	–	–	1	1	–	37	4	10	2	–
20	RB	Pedj Bojic	25	10	–	2	1	–	2	–	–	2	–	–	–	–	–	31	11	–	3	–
21	LM	David Galbraith	9	16	1	–	1	–	2	–	–	2	–	–	–	–	–	13	17	1	1	–
22	CM	David Hicks	1	2	–	–	–	–	1	–	–	–	1	–	–	–	–	2	3	–	1	–
23	RB	Luke Graham	–	–	–	–	–	–	–	–	–	–	–	–	–	–	–	–	–	–	–	–
25	ST	Scott Cross	–	1	–	–	–	–	–	–	–	–	–	–	–	–	–	–	1	–	–	–
27	CM	Lee Williamson	31	6	–	2	–	1	1	–	–	2	–	1	1	–	–	37	6	2	10	–
28	CM	Sam Togwell	7	1	–	–	–	–	–	–	–	–	–	–	2	–	–	9	1	–	1	–
Players no longer at the club:
7	CM	Martin Reeves	–	1	–	–	–	–	–	1	–	–	–	–	–	–	–	–	2	–	–	–
8	ST	Tom Youngs	4	5	–	–	–	–	1	1	–	1	–	–	–	–	–	6	6	–	–	–
8	ST	Stuart Noble	–	4	–	–	–	–	–	–	–	–	–	–	–	–	–	–	4	–	–	–
15	CM	Bertrand Cozic	8	6	–	1	1	–	1	–	–	1	1	–	–	–	–	11	8	–	1	1
15	ST	Danny Crow	4	6	2	–	–	–	–	–	–	–	–	–	–	–	–	4	6	2	–	–
16	U	Ryan Amoo	2	3	–	–	–	–	–	–	–	–	1	–	–	–	–	2	3	–	1	1
17	ST	Steve Morison	1	4	1	–	–	–	–	2	–	–	–	–	–	–	–	1	6	1	–	–
24	ST	Trevor Benjamin	5	–	2	1	–	–	–	–	–	–	–	–	–	–	–	6	–	2	1	1
24	CM	Mark Hughes	3	–	–	–	–	–	–	–	–	–	–	–	–	–	–	3	–	–	1	–
24	ST	Lee Barnard	3	2	–	–	–	–	–	–	–	–	–	–	–	–	–	3	2	–	1	–
25	DF	Steve Haslam	2	1	–	–	–	–	–	–	–	–	–	–	–	–	–	2	1	–	–	–
26	GK	Paul Rachubka	10	–	–	–	–	–	1	–	–	–	–	–	–	–	–	11	–	–	1	–
28	ST	Julian Alsop	1	6	1	–	1	–	–	–	–	2	–	1	–	–	–	3	7	2	1	–
24	ST	Greg Ngoyi	–	1	–	–	–	–	–	–	–	–	–	–	–	–	–	–	1	–	–	–
