= Alan Julian =

English footballer (born 1983)

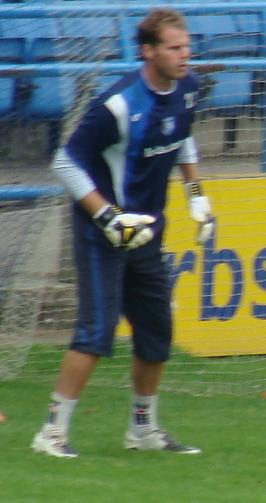
- Julian training with Gillingham in 2008

Personal information
- Full name: Alan John Julian
- Date of birth: 11 March 1983 (age 43)
- Place of birth: Ashford, England
- Height: 6 ft 2 in (1.88 m)
- Position: Goalkeeper

Youth career
- 2000–2002: Brentford

Senior career*
Years	Team	Apps	(Gls)
2002–2005	Brentford	16	(0)
2005–2008	Stevenage Borough	141	(0)
2008–2011	Gillingham	73	(0)
2011–2012	Stevenage	3	(0)
2012–2013	Newport County	11	(0)
2013–2014	Dartford	42	(0)
2014–2015	Sutton United	10	(0)
2015–2017	Bromley	80	(0)
2017–2020	Billericay Town	119	(0)
2020–2024	Hampton & Richmond Borough	80	(0)
Total		575	(0)

International career
2001	Northern Ireland U18	1	(0)
2001	Northern Ireland U19	3	(0)
2004	Northern Ireland U21	1	(0)

Managerial career
- 2024–2025: Hampton & Richmond Borough
- 2026: Slough Town
- * Club domestic league appearances and goals as of 15:27, 1 August 2026 (UTC)

Alan John Julian (born 11 March 1983) is a professional football manager and former footballer. A goalkeeper, he made 664 senior appearances during a 22-year playing career.

Julian began his career at Brentford, progressing through the academy before making his first-team debut in November 2002. He joined Stevenage Borough in February 2005, becoming first-choice goalkeeper and winning the FA Trophy in May 2007, the first competitive final held at the new Wembley Stadium. He moved to Gillingham in May 2008, making 80 appearances across three seasons before returning to Stevenage for the 2011–12 season and then spending a year at Newport County. After being named Dartford's Player of the Year in the 2013–14 season, he joined Sutton United and later Bromley, helping the latter win promotion to the National League and spending two years as their regular goalkeeper.

He subsequently made 156 appearances across three and a half years at Billericay Town, winning promotion to the National League South, before signing for Hampton & Richmond Borough in September 2020. Julian retired in May 2024 and was appointed the club's first-team manager later that month. After leaving the club in December 2025, he was appointed manager of Slough Town in May 2026, but left the position four months later. Internationally, he represented Northern Ireland at under-18, under-19, and under-21 levels.

== Early life ==
Julian was born at Ashford Hospital in Surrey. Aged nine, he was offered a trial at Brentford after his father contacted the club. He is a lifelong Chelsea supporter.

== Club career ==
=== Brentford ===
Julian joined Brentford at the age of nine following a successful trial. While also playing for Sunbury Manor and Sunbury Casuals, he progressed through the youth system and signed his first professional contract in 2002. Julian made his senior debut in a 1–0 victory over Plymouth Argyle in the Football League Trophy on 12 November 2002, and made a further three appearances during the 2002–03 season. At the end of the season, he signed a new contract with Brentford, keeping him at the club until 2005. He made 14 appearances during the 2003–04 season, before leaving the club in February 2005, stating "the time had come" to pursue regular first-team football.

=== Stevenage Borough ===
He signed for Stevenage Borough on a free transfer on 4 February 2005, making his debut in a 1–0 victory over Scarborough. He kept seven clean sheets in 17 appearances during the second half of the 2004–05 season, including in a 1–0 win against Hereford United at Edgar Street in the play-off semi-final second leg. Julian featured in the play-off final, a 1–0 defeat to Carlisle United at the Britannia Stadium. He remained with the club for the 2005–06 season, "attracting interest from scouts" during the club's strong start. Stevenage recorded 12 clean sheets during the season, but missed out on the play-offs after a 2–0 defeat to Forest Green Rovers, finishing sixth. Julian made 45 appearances and was named Stevenage's Player of the Year.

Ahead of the 2006–07 season, new manager Mark Stimson signed goalkeeper Danny Potter, stating he would be first choice. Julian was an unused substitute for the opening two matches of the season, but made his first appearance as a 63rd-minute substitute following Potter's red card in a 3–2 home defeat to Crawley Town on 18 August 2006. He retained his place thereafter, making 53 appearances as Stevenage finished eighth in the Conference National. Eight of those appearances came during the club's successful FA Trophy campaign, in which he kept four clean sheets. Julian started in the final, a 3–2 victory against Kidderminster Harriers at Wembley Stadium in front of 53,262 spectators. The result made Stevenage the first team to win a competitive final at the new stadium.

Julian kept his first clean sheet of the 2007–08 season in Stevenage's 3–0 home victory over Weymouth, which served as the catalyst for a run of eight matches without conceding a goal, equalling a Conference National record following a 4–0 win against Farsley Celtic at Broadhall Way. During this period, Julian went 778 minutes without conceding a goal. After Stimson departed for Gillingham, Julian declined a new contract offer, stating his intention to "keep his options open for the summer", and was subsequently transfer-listed in January 2008. Despite this, he remained first-choice goalkeeper under new manager Peter Taylor until a 3–1 home defeat to Torquay United on 12 April 2008, his final appearance of the season. He made 44 appearances during the 2007–08 season, and 159 in total during his three-and-a-half year spell at the club.

=== Gillingham ===
Julian joined Gillingham on a free transfer on 21 May 2008, reuniting with former Stevenage manager Mark Stimson. He made his debut in a 1–0 home defeat to Colchester United in the League Cup first round on 12 August 2008. Serving as second choice to Simon Royce, Julian made six appearances in all competitions during the 2008–09 season, keeping three clean sheets, as Gillingham secured promotion to League One with a 1–0 play-off final victory over Shrewsbury Town.

Ahead of the 2009–10 season, Stimson stated he was undecided as to whether Julian or Royce would start in the club's opening fixture. Julian was ultimately selected and played in Gillingham's 5–0 home victory against Swindon Town on the opening day of the season. After three consecutive defeats in which the team conceded seven goals, Julian was replaced by Royce for the League Cup tie against Blackburn Rovers. Over the next four months, Julian made only two appearances, both in the Football League Trophy, and subsequently submitted a transfer request due to limited first-team opportunities. Gillingham received no offers, with manager Mark Stimson stating: "You don't just say I'm on the transfer list and six teams come in for you". Julian remained with the club and, after returning to the starting line-up in a 2–1 defeat at Huddersfield Town in December 2009, he retained the position for the remainder of the season. The club were relegated to League Two following a 3–0 defeat to Wycombe Wanderers on the final day. Julian made 33 appearances during the season, keeping eight clean sheets.

Under new manager Andy Hessenthaler, Julian started the 2010–11 season as Gillingham's first-choice goalkeeper. Similar to the previous season, he lost his place following a winless run at the start of the campaign. New signing Lance Cronin impressed during a draw against Morecambe, and kept Julian out of the first team for five weeks. Following a 7–4 away defeat to Accrington Stanley, Julian returned to the starting line-up. He was part of the team that ended Gillingham's 35-game winless away run with a 1–0 victory against Oxford United at the Kassam Stadium on 20 November 2010. He remained first-choice goalkeeper throughout the season as Gillingham finished in eighth position in League Two, making 41 appearances in all competitions, keeping 12 clean sheets. Despite being the club's first-choice goalkeeper, Julian was informed that he was no longer part of the club's plans and was released on 11 May 2011. He made 80 appearances in all competitions during his three-year spell at Gillingham.

=== Return to Stevenage ===
In June 2011, Julian rejoined former club Stevenage on a free transfer, three years after his departure. The move reunited him with manager Graham Westley, who had initially brought him to the club in 2005. On signing, Julian stated: "I had a great time at Stevenage before and coming back now and we are in League One, it is a dream come true". Following an injury to first-choice goalkeeper Chris Day, Julian started in the club's first three matches of the 2011–12 season, keeping a clean sheet in the opening fixture, a 0–0 home draw against Exeter City. Day returned thereafter, limiting Julian to just two further appearances that season. He was released upon the expiry of his contract in May 2012.

=== Newport County ===
A month after leaving Stevenage, Julian joined Conference Premier club Newport County on a free transfer. In the club's first pre-season match ahead of the 2012–13 season, away to Caldicot Town, Julian sustained a knee ligament injury. The injury ruled him out for the first three months of the season, before making his first-team debut on 17 November 2012, in a 3–1 home defeat to Hyde. Julian made 11 appearances during a season in which Newport secured promotion to the Football League after a 25-year absence, following a 2–0 play-off final victory over Wrexham in May 2013.

=== Dartford ===
Julian left Newport at the end of the season and opted to move to part-time football, signing for Conference Premier club Dartford on 21 May 2013. Upon his arrival, Dartford manager Tony Burman described him as a professional and experienced addition to the squad. Julian made 45 appearances in all competitions during the 2013–14 season, at the end of which Dartford were relegated to the Conference South after finishing 22nd. He was voted Dartford's Player of the Year and won a further three individual accolades at the club's end-of-season awards ceremony.

=== Sutton United ===
Julian declined Dartford's offer of a new contract at the end of the season and joined Conference South club Sutton United in May 2014. He stated the decision was based on personal logistics rather than financial reasons, citing Sutton's closer proximity to his home. A pre-season knee injury saw him begin the 2014–15 season as second-choice goalkeeper behind Tom Lovelock. Following Lovelock's red card in a match against Chelmsford City, Julian returned to the starting line-up and made 14 appearances during the first half of the season, before departing in January 2015.

=== Bromley ===
Julian signed for fellow Conference South club Bromley on 22 January 2015. He made his debut two days later in a 2–1 away victory against Basingstoke Town, Julian made 17 appearances during the second half of the season as Bromley achieved promotion to the National League as Conference South champions. He remained a regular during the 2015–16 and 2016–17 seasons, as the club consolidated its position in the National League, before submitting a transfer request in February 2017. Julian made 88 appearances during his time at the club.

=== Billericay Town ===
Julian subsequently signed for Isthmian League Premier Division club Billericay Town on 16 February 2017. He made 63 appearances during the 2017–18 season as Billericay won the Isthmian League Premier Division title, securing promotion to the National League South. That season, the club also won the Alan Turvey Trophy and Essex Senior Cup. Julian scored his first senior goal in an FA Cup fourth qualifying round match against his former club Sutton United on 19 October 2019. The goal, a header in injury time, earned Billericay a 1–1 draw and a replay. The 2019–20 season was curtailed due to the COVID-19 pandemic, and Julian departed the club upon the expiry of his contract. He made 156 appearances during his three-and-a-half year spell at Billericay.

=== Hampton & Richmond Borough ===
In September 2020, Julian joined National League South club Hampton & Richmond Borough following a successful trial. He made his debut in a 1–0 away victory against Corinthian in the FA Cup on 3 October 2020. The 2020–21 season was curtailed due to restrictions associated with the COVID-19 pandemic, with Julian having made 21 appearances at the time of suspension. During his time at Hampton & Richmond, he made 89 appearances, including his 600th competitive appearance in a 3–1 win over Wimborne Town on 2 October 2021. In March 2024, Julian announced that he would be retiring at the end of the 2023–24 season, concurrently assuming the role of goalkeeping coach with immediate effect.

== International career ==
Julian was eligible to play for Northern Ireland through his grandfather, John Julian Sr, who was born in Belfast. He earned caps at under-18 and under-19 levels before making a single appearance for the Northern Ireland under-21 team in a 0–0 draw against Switzerland in August 2004.

== Managerial career ==
=== Hampton & Richmond Borough ===
Having initially served as the club's goalkeeping coach, Julian was appointed as first-team manager of Hampton & Richmond Borough on 13 May 2024. During the 2024–25 season, Hampton & Richmond finished 18th in the National League South, avoiding relegation amid a change of ownership. Julian later described keeping the club in the division as the greatest achievement of his football career. He left the club by mutual consent on 1 December 2025.

=== Slough Town ===
Julian was appointed manager of National League South club Slough Town on 4 May 2026. Following six consecutive defeats at the start of the 2026–27 season, Slough Town announced on 6 September 2026 that the club and Julian had parted ways.

== Career statistics ==
Appearances and goals by club, season and competition
Club	Season	League			FA Cup		League Cup		Other		Total	
Club	Season	Division	Apps	Goals	Apps	Goals	Apps	Goals	Apps	Goals	Apps	Goals
Brentford	2000–01	Second Division	0	0	0	0	0	0	0	0	0	0
Brentford	2001–02	Second Division	0	0	0	0	0	0	0	0	0	0
Brentford	2002–03	Second Division	3	0	0	0	0	0	1 (Note: Appearance(s) in Football League Trophy)	0	4	0
Brentford	2003–04	Second Division	13	0	0	0	1	0	0	0	14	0
Brentford	2004–05	League One	0	0	0	0	0	0	1	0	1	0
Brentford	Total		16	0	0	0	1	0	2	0	19	0
Stevenage Borough	2004–05	Conference National	14	0	0	0	—		3 (Note: Appearances in 2005 Conference National play-offs)	0	17	0
Stevenage Borough	2005–06	Conference National	41	0	4	0	—		0	0	45	0
Stevenage Borough	2006–07	Conference National	43	0	2	0	—		8 (Note: Appearance(s) in FA Trophy)	0	53	0
Stevenage Borough	2007–08	Conference Premier	43	0	1	0	—		1	0	45	0
Stevenage Borough	Total		141	0	7	0	0	0	12	0	160	0
Gillingham	2008–09	League Two	4	0	1	0	1	0	0	0	6	0
Gillingham	2009–10	League One	30	0	1	0	0	0	2	0	33	0
Gillingham	2010–11	League Two	39	0	1	0	1	0	0	0	41	0
Gillingham	Total		73	0	3	0	2	0	2	0	80	0
Stevenage	2011–12	League One	3	0	0	0	1	0	1	0	5	0
Newport County	2012–13	Conference Premier	11	0	0	0	—		1	0	12	0
Dartford	2013–14	Conference Premier	42	0	3	0	—		0	0	45	0
Sutton United	2014–15	Conference South	10	0	3	0	—		0	0	13	0
Bromley	2014–15	Conference South	17	0	—		—		0	0	17	0
Bromley	2015–16	National League	32	0	0	0	—		1	0	33	0
Bromley	2016–17	National League	31	0	1	0	—		3	0	35	0
Bromley	Total		80	0	1	0	0	0	4	0	85	0
Billericay Town	2016–17	Isthmian League Premier Division	14	0	—		—		1 (Note: Appearance in Alan Turvey Trophy)	0	15	0
Billericay Town	2017–18	Isthmian League Premier Division	45	0	9	0	—		9 (Note: Seven appearances in FA Trophy; two appearances in Alan Turvey Trophy)	0	63	0
Billericay Town	2018–19	National League South	32	0	4	0	—		5	0	41	0
Billericay Town	2019–20	National League South	28	0	4	1	—		5	0	37	1
Billericay Town	Total		119	0	17	1	0	0	20	0	156	1
Hampton & Richmond Borough	2020–21	National League South	17	0	4	0	—		0	0	21	0
Hampton & Richmond Borough	2021–22	National League South	39	0	3	0	—		2 (Note: One appearance in FA Trophy; one appearance in Middlesex Senior Cup)	0	44	0
Hampton & Richmond Borough	2022–23	National League South	23	0	0	0	—		0	0	23	0
Hampton & Richmond Borough	2023–24	National League South	1	0	0	0	—		0	0	1	0
Hampton & Richmond Borough	Total		80	0	7	0	0	0	2	0	89	0
Career total			575	0	40	1	4	0	45	0	664	1

=== International ===
National team	Season	Apps	Goals	Ref
Northern Ireland U18	2000–01	1	0	
Northern Ireland U19	2001–02	3	0	
Northern Ireland U21	2004–05	1	0	

== Honours ==
Stevenage

- FA Trophy: 2006–07

Gillingham

- Football League Two play-offs: 2009

Newport County

- Conference Premier play-offs: 2013

Bromley

- Conference South: 2014–15

Billericay Town

- Alan Turvey Trophy: 2016–17, 2017–18
- Isthmian League Premier Division: 2017–18
- Essex Senior Cup: 2017–18

Individual

- Stevenage Player of the Year: 2005–06
- Dartford Player of the Year: 2013–14
- Isthmian League Premier Division Team of the Year: 2017–18
