= 2006–07 FA Trophy =

2006-07 FA Trophy
FA Challenge Trophy

Tournament details
- Country: England; Wales
- Teams: 246

Final positions
- Champions: Stevenage Borough
- Runners-up: Kidderminster Harriers

The 2006–07 FA Trophy was the thirty-eighth season of the FA Trophy.

== Preliminary round ==
=== Ties ===
Tie	Home team	Score	Away team
1	Warrington Town	3–2	Wakefield
2	Willenhall Town	3–1	Gresley Rovers
3	Belper Town	0-0	Skelmersdale United
4	Alsager Town	2–0	Stocksbridge Park Steels
5	Clitheroe	3–2	Bamber Bridge
6	Goole	0-0	Kidsgrove Athletic
7	Cammell Laird	2–0	Rossendale United
8	Enfield Town	0–2	Rothwell Town
9	Dartford	4–1	Ilford
10	Canvey Island	0–3	Maldon Town
11	Horsham YMCA	3–1	Aveley
12	Maidstone United	2–0	Bury Town
13	Enfield	1-1	Corinthian-Casuals
14	Godalming Town	1–2	Dunstable Town
15	Tooting & Mitcham United	2-2	Dulwich Hamlet
16	Chatham Town	1–2	A.F.C. Sudbury
17	Waltham Forest	1-1	Ashford Town (Kent)
18	Waltham Abbey	1–0	Burgess Hill Town
19	Redbridge	2–3	Sittingbourne
20	Leatherhead	1-1	Berkhamsted Town
21	Molesey	3–0	Metropolitan Police
22	Leighton Town	2–1	Woodford United
23	A F C Hornchurch	2–1	Fleet Town
24	Hastings United	2–1	Croydon Athletic
25	Arlesey Town	0-0	Flackwell Heath
26	Oxford City	1-1	Bashley
27	Bromsgrove Rovers	1-1	Abingdon United
28	Andover	3–1	Chesham United
29	Bishop's Cleeve	1–0	Newport I O W
30	Uxbridge	1-1	Marlow
31	Lymington & New Milton	1–4	Brook House
32	Bracknell Town	2–0	Beaconsfield SYCOB
33	Cinderford Town	2–3	Windsor & Eton
34	Malvern Town	0–4	Stourbridge

=== Replays ===
Tie	Home team	Score	Away team
3	Skelmersdale United	2–1	Belper Town
6	Kidsgrove Athletic	3–2	Goole
13	Corinthian-Casuals	0–1	Enfield
15	Dulwich Hamlet	6–7	Tooting & Mitcham United
17	Ashford Town (Kent)	1-1	Waltham Forest
	(Waltham Forest won 5–4 on penalties)		
20	Berkhamsted Town	2–4	Leatherhead
25	Flackwell Heath	1–2	Arlesey Town
26	Bashley	1–3	Oxford City
27	Abingdon United	3–2	Bromsgrove Rovers
30	Marlow	3-3	Uxbridge
	(Marlow won 5–4 on penalties)		

== First qualifying round ==
=== Ties ===
Tie	Home team	Score	Away team
1	Witton Albion	2–1	Fleetwood Town
2	Alsager Town	3–0	Brigg Town
3	Skelmersdale United	3–0	Prescot Cables
4	Guiseley	5–4	Grantham Town
5	Sutton Coldfield Town	2-2	Gateshead
6	Spalding United	1–4	Ilkeston Town
7	Burscough	2–1	Matlock Town
8	Radcliffe Borough	3–2	Leek Town
9	Rushall Olympic	3–0	Colwyn Bay
10	Warrington Town	0–1	Clitheroe
11	Bridlington Town	2–4	Stamford
12	Mossley	5–1	Lincoln United
13	Kendal Town	4–2	Buxton
14	Woodley Sports	6–1	Marine
15	Kidsgrove Athletic	2–1	Harrogate Railway Athletic
16	Ossett Albion	2-2	Willenhall Town
17	Hednesford Town	2-2	Halesowen Town
18	North Ferriby United	2-2	Bradford Park Avenue
19	Whitby Town	3–0	Shepshed Dynamo
20	Frickley Athletic	0–4	Cammell Laird
21	Ossett Town	2–3	Ashton United
22	Chasetown	3–1	Chorley
23	AFC Telford United	1-1	Eastwood Town
24	Hampton & Richmond Borough	5–3	Hitchin Town
25	Worthing	0–1	King's Lynn
26	AFC Wimbledon	2–1	Dunstable Town
27	Staines Town	0–1	Folkestone Invicta
28	Boreham Wood	1-1	Tooting & Mitcham United
29	Wivenhoe Town	1–3	Margate
30	Ware	0–1	Enfield
31	Wingate & Finchley	0–1	Northwood
32	Maidenhead United	3–1	Dover Athletic
33	Hastings United	0–1	Waltham Forest
34	Wealdstone	2–0	Witham Town
35	Corby Town	2–4	Hemel Hempstead Town
36	Dartford	6–0	Horsham YMCA
37	Bromley	6–3	East Thurrock United
38	Carshalton Athletic	4–1	Potters Bar Town
39	Cheshunt	0–1	Cray Wanderers
40	Waltham Abbey	1-1	Heybridge Swifts
41	Billericay Town	2-2	Aylesbury United
42	Leatherhead	1–0	Rothwell Town
43	Maldon Town	0-0	Leyton
44	Hendon	1–2	Ramsgate
45	Tonbridge Angels	3–1	Harlow Town
46	Leighton Town	4–1	Slough Town
47	Molesey	3–1	Barton Rovers
48	Chelmsford City	1–2	Maidstone United
49	Walton & Hersham	0–1	Great Wakering Rovers
50	A F C Sudbury	2-2	Kingstonian
51	Ashford Town (Middx)	2–1	Brackley Town
52	Sittingbourne	0-0	Arlesey Town
53	Whyteleafe	0-0	Walton Casuals
54	Tilbury	0–1	Horsham
55	A F C Hornchurch	1–0	Harrow Borough
56	Bedworth United	0-0	Solihull Borough
57	Thatcham Town	0–3	Didcot Town
58	Evesham United	2–0	Brook House
59	Stourport Swifts	1–5	Mangotsfield United
60	Clevedon Town	1–3	Windsor & Eton
61	Hanwell Town	2–1	Rugby Town
62	Burnham	0–5	Team Bath
63	Bath City	2–1	Bishop's Cleeve
64	Taunton Town	0-0	Banbury United
65	Paulton Rovers	0–3	Cirencester Town
66	Tiverton Town	2-2	Gloucester City
67	Merthyr Tydfil	2–0	Stourbridge
68	Abingdon United	4–2	Bracknell Town
69	Winchester City	1–0	Oxford City
70	Marlow	0-0	Andover
71	Swindon Supermarine	2–1	Yate Town
72	Hillingdon Borough	2-2	Chippenham Town

=== Replays ===
Tie	Home team	Score	Away team
5	Gateshead	3–0	Sutton Coldfield Town
16	Willenhall Town	2–1	Ossett Albion
17	Halesowen Town	2–1	Hednesford Town
18	Bradford Park Avenue	3–2	North Ferriby United
23	Eastwood Town	1–0	A F C Telford United
28	Tooting & Mitcham United	2–0	Boreham Wood
40	Heybridge Swifts	8–0	Waltham Abbey
41	Aylesbury United	1–4	Billericay Town
43	Leyton	3–1	Maldon Town
50	Kingstonian	2–3	A F C Sudbury
52	Arlesey Town	1–2	Sittingbourne
53	Walton Casuals	5–0	Whyteleafe
56	Solihull Borough	5–1	Bedworth United
64	Banbury United	5–1	Taunton Town
66	Gloucester City	2-2	Tiverton Town
	(Gloucester City won 4–2 on penalties)		
70	Andover	1–2	Marlow
72	Chippenham Town	3–0	Hillingdon Borough

== Second qualifying round ==
=== Ties ===
Tie	Home team	Score	Away team
1	Cammell Laird	2–1	Mossley
2	Skelmersdale United	4–2	Kendal Town
3	Burscough	3–0	Eastwood Town
4	Woodley Sports	3–2	Whitby Town
5	Ashton United	0–1	Gateshead
6	Halesowen Town	1-1	Clitheroe
7	Witton Albion	2–0	Alsager Town
8	Ilkeston Town	2–0	Guiseley
9	Willenhall Town	1-1	Rushall Olympic
10	Bradford Park Avenue	2–0	Solihull Borough
11	Kidsgrove Athletic	0-0	Chasetown
12	Radcliffe Borough	1–2	Stamford
13	Maidstone United	2–3	Ashford Town (Middx)
14	Enfield	1-1	Walton Casuals
15	Sittingbourne	0-0	Bath City
16	Folkestone Invicta	2–3	Billericay Town
17	Hanwell Town	2–3	Cirencester Town
18	Hemel Hempstead Town	8–4	Abingdon United
19	Chippenham Town	3-3	Didcot Town
20	Carshalton Athletic	0–1	Heybridge Swifts
21	Leyton	1–2	King's Lynn
22	AFC Wimbledon	3–2	Tonbridge Angels
23	Tooting & Mitcham United	1-1	Bromley
24	Leatherhead	0–3	Team Bath
25	Dartford	0–1	Evesham United
26	Leighton Town	2-2	Wealdstone
27	Gloucester City	1–0	Margate
28	A F C Hornchurch	1–3	Mangotsfield United
29	Molesey	1–0	Swindon Supermarine
30	Windsor & Eton	2–0	Hampton & Richmond Borough
31	A F C Sudbury	2–0	Ramsgate
32	Maidenhead United	2–1	Horsham
33	Northwood	0-0	Winchester City
34	Great Wakering Rovers	0–1	Merthyr Tydfil
35	Waltham Forest	1–2	Cray Wanderers
36	Marlow	0–2	Banbury United

=== Replays ===
Tie	Home team	Score	Away team
6	Clitheroe	1–0	Halesowen Town
9	Rushall Olympic	2–0	Willenhall Town
11	Chasetown	1-1	Kidsgrove Athletic
	(Chasetown won 4–3 on penalties)		
14	Walton Casuals	2-2	Enfield
	(Enfield won 5–4 on penalties)		
15	Bath City	4–0	Sittingbourne
19	Didcot Town	3–1	Chippenham Town
23	Bromley	0–1	Tooting & Mitcham United
26	Wealdstone	3–0	Leighton Town
33	Winchester City	1–4	Northwood

== Third qualifying round ==
The teams from Conference North and Conference South entered in this round.

=== Ties ===
Tie	Home team	Score	Away team
1	Lancaster City	0–1	Redditch United
2	Skelmersdale United	1–2	Farsley Celtic
3	Hinckley United	1–0	Ilkeston Town
4	Chasetown	0–3	Hyde United
5	Droylsden	3–0	Rushall Olympic
6	Kettering Town	10–1	Clitheroe
7	Leigh R M I	1–0	Cammell Laird
8	Alfreton Town	0–1	Harrogate Town
9	Stamford	0–3	Witton Albion
10	Blyth Spartans	1-1	Worcester City
11	Hucknall Town	1-1	Barrow
12	Gainsborough Trinity	1-1	Stalybridge Celtic
13	Moor Green	0–3	Woodley Sports
14	Bradford Park Avenue	1–2	Nuneaton Borough
15	Workington	2–4	Gateshead
16	Burscough	1–2	Scarborough
17	Vauxhall Motors	2-2	Worksop Town
18	Banbury United	2–3	Lewes
19	Windsor & Eton	1–2	King's Lynn
20	Cambridge City	0–1	A F C Sudbury
21	Havant & Waterlooville	3–0	Team Bath
22	Ashford Town (Middx)	2–1	Thurrock
23	AFC Wimbledon	1-1	Eastleigh
24	Bishop's Stortford	2–1	Molesey
25	Basingstoke Town	2–0	Bedford Town
26	Northwood	1–2	Histon
27	Merthyr Tydfil	2–1	Wealdstone
28	Heybridge Swifts	2–0	Bognor Regis Town
29	Weston super Mare	1–0	Cirencester Town
30	Hemel Hempstead Town	2-2	Evesham United
31	Didcot Town	0–3	Newport County
32	Gloucester City	2–5	Eastbourne Borough
33	Cray Wanderers	1-1	Yeading
34	Sutton United	2–3	Braintree Town
35	Salisbury City	2–1	Enfield
36	Billericay Town	1–2	Mangotsfield United
37	Welling United	3–0	Dorchester Town
38	Hayes	0–5	Fisher Athletic London
39	Bath City	1-1	Tooting & Mitcham United
40	Farnborough Town	1-1	Maidenhead United

=== Replays ===
Tie	Home team	Score	Away team
10	Worcester City	1-1	Blyth Spartans
	(Worcester won 5–4 on penalties)		
11	Barrow	2–1	Hucknall Town
12	Stalybridge Celtic	2–1	Gainsborough Trinity
17	Worksop Town	0–1	Vauxhall Motors
23	Eastleigh	2-2	AFC Wimbledon
	(AFC Wimbledon won 4–2 on penalties)		
30	Evesham United	3-3	Hemel Hempstead Town
	(Evesham won 4–2 on penalties)		
33	Yeading	7–1	Cray Wanderers
39	Tooting & Mitcham United	0–1	Bath City
40	Maidenhead United	0–3	Farnborough Town

== First round ==
The teams from Conference National entered in this round.

=== Ties ===
Tie	Home team	Score	Away team
1	Rushden & Diamonds	3–2	Scarborough
2	Kettering Town	1–0	Stafford Rangers
3	Stalybridge Celtic	2-2	Hinckley United
4	Altrincham	0-0	Tamworth
5	Gateshead	0–4	Burton Albion
6	Halifax Town	3–1	Hyde United
7	Harrogate Town	1-1	Leigh R M I
8	Kidderminster Harriers	4-4	Vauxhall Motors
9	Southport	1–0	Droylsden
10	Morecambe	2–1	York City
11	Northwich Victoria	3–1	Farsley Celtic
12	Woodley Sports	1–3	Witton Albion
13	Nuneaton Borough	0–3	Redditch United
14	Barrow	2–5	Worcester City
15	Salisbury City	3–1	Woking
16	Dagenham & Redbridge	2–0	Crawley Town
17	Bishop's Stortford	3–2	St Albans City
18	Welling United	0-0	Basingstoke Town
19	Mangotsfield United	2–1	King's Lynn
20	Weymouth	1–2	Grays Athletic
21	Havant & Waterlooville	1–2	Gravesend & Northfleet
22	Fisher Athletic London	0–1	Eastbourne Borough
23	Braintree Town	3–0	Ashford Town (Middx)
24	Forest Green Rovers	0–1	Yeading
25	Farnborough Town	1-1	Bath City
26	Aldershot Town	1–2	AFC Wimbledon
27	Stevenage Borough	7–0	Merthyr Tydfil
28	Newport County	2–1	A F C Sudbury
29	Exeter City	3–0	Heybridge Swifts
30	Weston super Mare	1–0	Evesham United
31	Lewes	0-0	Oxford United
32	Histon	5–0	Cambridge United

=== Replays ===
Tie	Home team	Score	Away team
3	Hinckley United	1–2	Stalybridge Celtic
4	Tamworth	2–1	Altrincham
7	Leigh R M I	2–1	Harrogate Town
8	Vauxhall Motors	0–4	Kidderminster Harriers
18	Basingstoke Town	0–2	Welling United
25	Bath City	0–1	Farnborough Town
31	Oxford United	1–0	Lewes

== Second round ==
=== Ties ===
Tie	Home team	Score	Away team
1	Stalybridge Celtic	1-1	Kettering Town
2	Oxford United	2-2	Halifax Town
3	Morecambe	5–0	Mangotsfield United
4	Tamworth	1-1	Welling United
5	Newport County	0-0	Histon
6	Eastbourne Borough	0–1	Northwich Victoria
7	Exeter City	0–1	Kidderminster Harriers
8	Salisbury City	2–1	Southport
9	Redditch United	3–2	Dagenham & Redbridge
10	Worcester City	2–1	Burton Albion
11	Witton Albion	0–1	Rushden & Diamonds
12	Weston super Mare	0–4	Grays Athletic
13	Farnborough Town	0–2	Braintree Town
14	Stevenage Borough	3–1	Leigh R M I
15	Yeading	2–0	Bishop's Stortford
16	Gravesend & Northfleet	0–1	AFC Wimbledon
	(AFC Wimbledon removed - ineligible player)		

=== Replays ===
Tie	Home team	Score	Away team
1	Kettering Town	3–1	Stalybridge Celtic
2	Halifax Town	2–1	Oxford United
4	Welling United	2–1	Tamworth
5	Histon	3–1	Newport County

== Third round ==
=== Ties ===
Tie	Home team	Score	Away team
1	Histon	1–2	Northwich Victoria
2	Welling United	2–1	Worcester City
3	Kettering Town	0–2	Salisbury City
4	Morecambe	1-1	Stevenage Borough
5	Halifax Town	3–1	Redditch United
6	Kidderminster Harriers	0-0	Braintree Town
7	Gravesend & Northfleet	2–1	Rushden & Diamonds
8	Grays Athletic	2–1	Yeading

=== Replays ===
Tie	Home team	Score	Away team
4	Stevenage Borough	3–0	Morecambe
6	Braintree Town	1–3	Kidderminster Harriers

== Fourth round ==
- Ties played on 24 and 25 February 2007.
2007-02-24
15:00

Kidderminster Harriers	3 - 1	Halifax Town
Constable 51'; Hurren 57'; Penn 90'		Trotman 45'

Aggborough, Kidderminster
Attendance: 1,580

2007-02-24
15:00

Northwich Victoria	3 - 0	Gravesend & Northfleet
Griffiths 31'; Battersby 55'; Shaw 60'	Report

Victoria Stadium, Northwich
Attendance: 810
Referee: M Oliver

2007-02-24
15:00

Stevenage Borough	3 - 0	Salisbury City
McMahon 24'; Morison 63'; Slabber 88'	Report

Broadhall Way, Stevenage
Attendance: 2,184

2007-02-25
13:00

Welling United	1 - 4	Grays Athletic
Moore 6'		Gray 35'; Poole 72'; Martin 75'; Thurgood 86'

Park View Road, Welling
Attendance: 1,163

== Semi-finals ==
- The two-legged ties were played on 10 and 17 March 2007.

=== First legs ===
2007-03-10
15:00

Kidderminster Harriers	2 - 0	Northwich Victoria
Hurren 38'; Constable 45'

Aggborough, Kidderminster
Attendance: 2,383

2007-03-10
15:00

Grays Athletic	0 - 1	Stevenage Borough
	Report	Gaia 72'

New Recreation Ground, Grays
Attendance: 1,918

=== Second legs ===
2007-03-17
15:00

Northwich Victoria	3 - 2	Kidderminster Harriers
Shaw 11'; Roca 14'; Carr 90' (pen.)		Creighton 25'; Penn 71'

Victoria Stadium, Northwich
Attendance: 2,129

Kidderminster win 4–3 on aggregate

2007-03-17
15:00

Stevenage Borough	2 - 1 (a.e.t)	Grays Athletic
Hughes 97'; Morison 120'	Report	Rhodes 49'

Broadhall Way, Stevenage
Attendance: 3,008

Stevenage win 3–1 on aggregate

== Final ==
2007-05-12
13:15

Kidderminster Harriers	2 - 3	Stevenage Borough
Constable 31', 37'		Cole 51'; Dobson 74'; Morison 88'

Wembley Stadium, London
Attendance: 53,262
