= Urban Freestyler =

Urban Freestyler is a UK-based urban sport brand, TV channel and media/events company formed in 2005. Urban Freestyler centres on freestyle football and in 2006 pushed the boundaries of urban sport by encompassing activities such as tennis, golf, mountain boarding and motorcycle trials.

== Urban Freestyler, The ==
The Urban Freestyler (2006) is an internationally acclaimed football freestyle DVD and TV Series, released in 2006 by Duke Video / BBC Worldwide and produced by Brick Lane Films.

The title is set amongst the inner city streets of London and features performances by freestyle football world champion Abbas Farid, Billy Wingrove, Mike Delaney, Dan Magness, Rob Walters, Faton Gerbeshi, Paul Wood, Joe Davies, Scott Griffiths, Craig Dobson, Al Johnson and basketball freestyler Tommy Baker.

There are also cameo appearances by UK skater Pete King and London Towers player Robert Youngblood.

The Urban Freestyler (2006) has a hip hop/reggae soundtrack featuring the Choong Family, Wordsmith, Genesis Elijah, U Brown and I-Roy.

== Urban Freestyler Extreme ==
Urban Freestyler Extreme (2007) is a 12-part TV series released by BBC Worldwide and produced by Brick Lane Films.

The title features 12 different urban sports: Football, basketball, golf, BMX, tennis, downhill mountain biking, breakdancing, mountain boarding, free climbing, free running, Aggressive Inline and motorcycle trials.

The Urban Freestyler Extreme cast features 14 current or former world champions, including Steve Peat, Mouse, Geoff Swain, Tom Kirkman, Steve Colley and John Farnworth.

Urban Freestyler Extreme is accredited for filming the first ever urban golf freestyle, urban tennis freestyle and urban trials freestyle.

== Urban Freestyler III ==
Urban Freestyler III (2011) is an internationally filmed football freestyle short TV Series, released in 2011 by BBC Worldwide and produced by Brick Lane Films.

The title features 20 freestylers from 14 countries, including freestyle football world champion Séan Garnier, John Farnworth, Dan Magness, Abdullah, Rene Methusek, Andreas, Arthur Mansilla, ATW Crew, Nam the Man, Pawel Skora, Mikolaj, Billy Fincham, Gunther Celli.

== Urban Freestyler Events ==
Urban Freestyler Events is a UK-based event management agency which organises and conducts freestyle performances around the world.
