= Craig Dobson =

English footballer (born 1984)

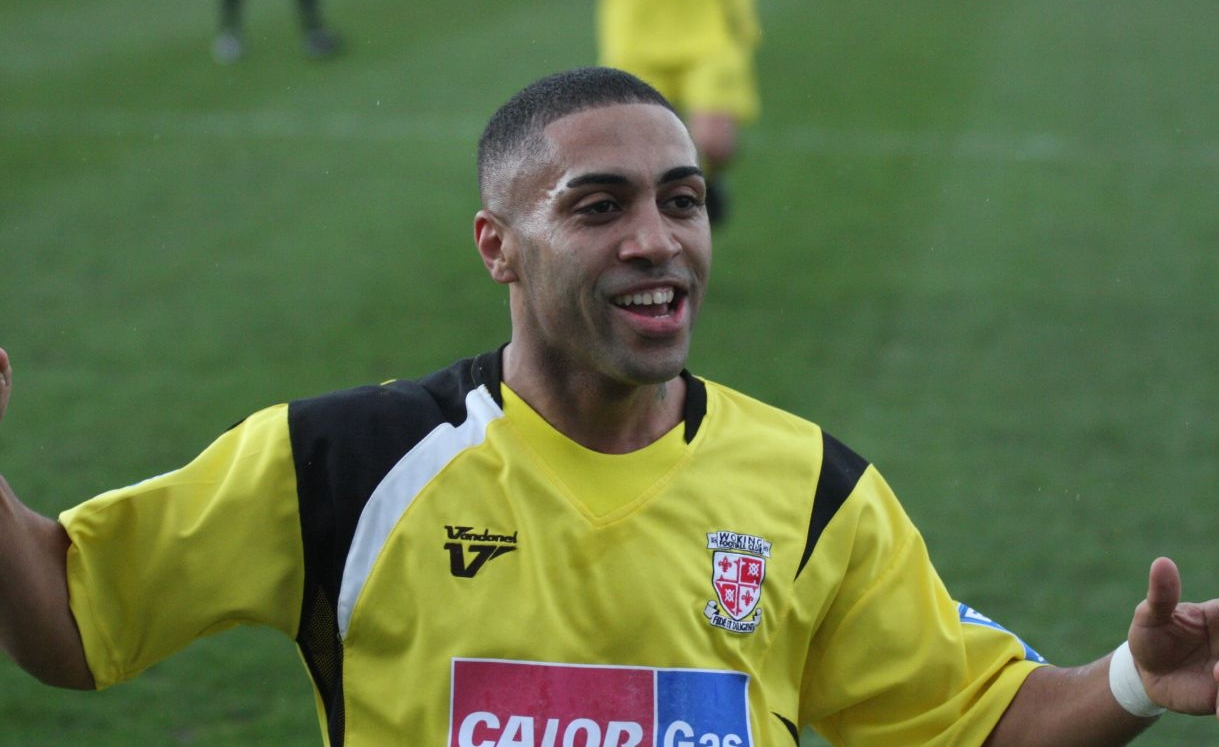
- Dobson while with Woking in 2011.

Personal information
- Date of birth: 23 January 1984 (age 42)
- Place of birth: Chingford, England
- Position: Midfielder

Youth career
- 2002–2003: Crystal Palace

Senior career*
Years	Team	Apps	(Gls)
2003–2004	Cheltenham Town	2	(0)
2004	Barnet	3	(0)
2005–2006	Cambridge City	40	(9)
2006–2008	Stevenage Borough	62	(14)
2008–2009	Milton Keynes Dons	1	(0)
2008	→ Wycombe Wanderers (loan)	0	(0)
2009	Brentford	0	(0)
2009–2010	Mansfield Town	5	(0)
2009	→ Kettering Town (loan)	1	(0)
2010	Farnborough	4	(1)
2010	Sutton United	5	(0)
2010–2011	Thurrock	4	(0)
2010–2011	→ Barnet (dual registration)	1	(0)
2011	Braintree Town	3	(0)
2011	Woking	18	(7)
2011–2012	Kettering Town	1	(0)

International career
2004	Jamaica	1	(0)
- * Club domestic league appearances and goals as of 18:38, 13 May 2012 (UTC)

Craig Dobson (born 23 January 1984) is a football midfielder, who is without a club. He is also a noted football freestyler, having appeared in the DVD Urban Freestyler.

== Club career ==
Dobson started his career with Crystal Palace, but having failed to make a first team appearance for the "Eagles", he joined Cheltenham Town in the summer of 2003. He made his debut on 27 September, coming on as an 80th minute substitute for Bertie Cozic in a 2–0 defeat at Bristol Rovers' Memorial Stadium. He left the club after a couple of brief cameos in the league and Football League Trophy. In June 2004, Dobson made his international debut for Jamaica, coming on as an 85th-minute substitute for Marlon King in a 1-0 Unity Cup defeat to Republic of Ireland at The Valley.

With Conference club Barnet for the start of the 2004–05 season, making four appearances. He was released in October 2004, after his month-long contract expired.

He spent 2005–06 with Conference South side Cambridge City. He scored nine goals in 40 league appearances. At the end of the season he had a trial with Gillingham.

Dobson signed with Conference outfit Stevenage Borough for a four-figure fee before the start of the 2006–07 season, he quickly established himself at Broadhall Way, making 38 appearances in his maiden season. He scored a brace against Stafford Rangers on 9 September, George Boyd also netting a hat-trick in a 6–0 win. Dobson scored a further three goals that season, including a 74th-minute goal in the 2007 FA Trophy final with Kidderminster Harriers at Wembley. Borough won the game 3–2 to lift the trophy.

Dobson was more clinical in front of goal during the 2007–08 campaign, netting ten times in 30 games. He was transfer listed in January after refusing to sign a new deal. This brought him the attention of League Two side Milton Keynes Dons, Paul Ince quickly brought him to stadium:mk for an undisclosed fee. He made his Dons debut in a 1–1 home draw with Morecambe on 3 May, though was taken off in favour of Lloyd Dyer at half time.

He made just the one appearance in 2008–09, playing the 2–1 defeat at Ninian Park to Cardiff City, in the League Cup Second Round. He spent December on loan at Wycombe Wanderers, but did not feature. Dobson had his contract terminated with MK Dons at the start of January 2009 by mutual consent, after suffering with groin and shin injuries during his year-long stay. He signed for Brentford in March 2009 on a two-month contract, but was released at the end of the season without playing a game, as Brentford were promoted to League One.

He went on trial with Shrewsbury Town for the 2009–10 pre-season and played in their friendly matches against Bridgnorth Town and West Bromwich Albion. In late September 2009, he was taken on trial at Port Vale by Micky Adams. He signed a three-month contract with Mansfield Town in October 2009, following a successful trial. In November 2009, Dobson joined Kettering Town on loan until 4 January 2010, when his contract with Mansfield expires.

In January 2010, Dobson joined Farnborough. After a handful of appearances he was released on 26 March 2010, and joined Sutton United. In July 2010, Dobson went on trial with League One side Leyton Orient, playing the first half in a 2–0 win against Cray Wanderers. Dobson signed for Conference South club Thurrock in October 2010, making his debut in the 1–0 away defeat to Braintree Town. In November 2010, he joined League Two club Barnet on dual registration. He was released by Barnet and Thurrock in February 2011, shortly before joining Braintree Town, before transferring to Woking later in that same month.

In July 2011 Dobson rejoined Kettering Town for the 2011–12 season. He suffered an anterior cruciate ligament injury on his first competitive appearance for the club, which led to his release from the club towards the end of the season.

After nearly two years out of football, Dobson was handed a trial at Concord Rangers in July 2013.

== International career ==
Dobson is reported to have made a late appearance as a substitute for Jamaica in a friendly with the Republic of Ireland in 2004. However The Guardian reported that he was an unused substitute. He entered the field at 84 minutes as a replacement for Marlon King (eyewitness report).

=== International caps ===
Scores and results list Jamaica's goal tally first. The "Caps" figures are in bold for games in which he scored

Caps	Date	Venue	Opponent	Result	Competition	Scored	Location	Cards
**01** (00)	2004-06-02	The Valley, London	Republic of Ireland	0–1	Friendly	0	(England)	

== Honours ==
with Barnet

- Conference National champion: 2004–05

with Stevenage Borough

- FA Trophy winner: 2007

with Milton Keynes Dons

- Football League Two champion: 2007–08

== See also ==
- World Freestyle Football Association
