= David Galbraith =

English footballer (born 1983)

Personal information
- Full name: David James Galbraith
- Date of birth: 20 December 1983 (age 42)
- Place of birth: Luton, England
- Position: Midfielder

Senior career*
Years	Team	Apps	(Gls)
2003–2004	Tottenham Hotspur	0	(0)
2004–2005	Northampton Town	15	(1)
2005–2008	Boston United	52	(4)
2008–2009	Kettering Town		
2009	King's Lynn		
2009–2010	St Albans City		
- Bedford
2012–2014	Arlesey Town		
- * Club domestic league appearances and goals

David Galbraith (born 20 December 1983) is an English former footballer who played as a midfielder.

== Career ==
Galbraith plays as a left sided midfielder, he joined Boston United in 2005 initially on loan from Northampton Town and is a former trainee at Tottenham Hotspur. He re-signed for the club after their double relegation, making him one of three players remaining from the previous season.

On 31 January 2008 Galbraith signed for Kettering Town.

He later played for King's Lynn, St Albans City, Bedford and Arlesey Town.

== Personal life ==
Galbraith attended Putteridge High School in Luton and now works with Freddie Knight at MIDA Civils.
