= Éric Sabin =

French footballer (born 1975)

Personal information
- Date of birth: 22 August 1975 (age 51)
- Place of birth: Sarcelles, France
- Height: 1.85 m (6 ft 1 in)
- Position: Forward

Senior career*
Years	Team	Apps	(Gls)
1994–1997	Nîmes	39	(7)
1997–1998	Gazélec Ajaccio		
1998–1999	Nîmes	29	(3)
1999–2001	ES Wasquehal	59	(7)
2001–2003	Swindon Town	73	(9)
2003–2004	Queens Park Rangers	10	(1)
2004	→ Boston United (loan)	2	(0)
2004–2005	Northampton Town	57	(13)
2005–2006	Oxford United	29	(7)
2006–2008	Arles	51	(10)
2008	Nîmes	1	(0)

International career
2008	Martinique	3	(4)
- * Club domestic league appearances and goals

Éric Sabin (born 22 August 1975) is a French former professional footballer, who played as a forward.

== Club career ==
Sabin started his professional career at Nîmes and played for several English clubs, Swindon Town, Queens Park Rangers (where he scored once against Grimsby), Boston United, Northampton Town and Oxford United. He also played for some other lower league outfits in France.

== International career ==
Sabin played three games for Martinique at the 2008 Caribbean Cup, scoring four goals.
