= Jamie Slabber =

English footballer (born 1984)

Personal information
- Full name: Jamie Andrew Slabber
- Date of birth: 31 December 1984 (age 41)
- Place of birth: Enfield, England
- Position: Striker

Youth career
- 2001–2003: Tottenham Hotspur

Senior career*
Years	Team	Apps	(Gls)
2003–2005	Tottenham Hotspur	1	(0)
2004	→ AB (loan)	4	(0)
2005	→ Swindon Town (loan)	9	(0)
2005	Aldershot Town	2	(0)
2005–2007	Grays Athletic	40	(13)
2006	→ Oxford United (loan)	3	(0)
2007	Stevenage Borough	4	(0)
2007–2008	Havant & Waterlooville	29	(2)
2008–2009	Grays Athletic	26	(3)
2009	Grays Athletic	17	(4)
2009–2010	Woking	3	(0)
2010–2012	Eastleigh	66	(33)
2012–2013	Chelmsford City	44	(26)
2013–2014	Sutton United	24	(13)
2014–2015	Bromley	32	(11)
2014	→ Farnborough (loan)	2	(1)
2015–2016	Hemel Hempstead Town	23	(11)
2016	→ Sutton United (loan)	9	(0)
2016–2017	Welling United	17	(1)
2016–2017	→ Bishop's Stortford (loan)	4	(0)
2017–2018	Grays Athletic	28	(3)
Total		386	(121)

International career
- England U18
- England U19
2005	England C	1	(0)
- * Club domestic league appearances and goals

Jamie Andrew Slabber (born 31 December 1984) is an English former footballer who played as a striker. He started his career as a youth at Tottenham Hotspur, where he made one appearance in the Premier League. Slabber was loaned out twice whilst at Spurs, to Danish side AB in 2004 and to Swindon Town in 2005.

He then dropped down into non-League football signing a short-term contract with Aldershot Town in April 2005 until the end of the 2004–05 season. The following season, he moved to Grays Athletic, before joining Oxford United on loan in November 2006. Slabber moved to Stevenage Borough in January 2007, staying for five months before joining Havant & Waterlooville the following season. He returned to Grays Athletic in November 2008. Slabber signed for Conference South club Woking in December 2009. Slabber signed for Eastleigh in July 2010, before moving onto Chelmsford City in March 2012. Following a successful spell with the Essex club, Slabber joined Sutton United, where he scored 14 goals in 31 appearances during the 2013–14 season. This included two goals against Bromley, the club for which he and teammate Damian Scannell would sign for at the end of the season.

Slabber went on to have spells at Farnborough (on loan), Hemel Hempstead Town, Sutton United for a second period on loan, Welling United, Bishop's Stortford (on loan) before returning to Grays Athletic for a fourth spell before announcing his retirement in February 2018.

== Club career ==
Born in Enfield, London, Slabber joined Tottenham Hotspur as a trainee in August 2001, where he was mainly used as a reserve team player. He made just one appearance in the Premier League, coming on as a substitute in the 79th minute for Gary Doherty against Liverpool in a 3–2 defeat on 16 March 2003. He set up Teddy Sheringham for Tottenham's second goal, four minutes from the end. He had loan spells at Danish outfit AB Copenhagen in 2004, and Swindon Town in 2005.

He was released from Spurs in April 2005 and signed for Aldershot Town until the end of the 2004–05 season. Slabber made a total of four appearances, including two in Aldershot's defeat on aggregate in the Conference National play-off semi-finals to Carlisle United, where he scored in the 90th minute of the second-leg. Slabber then signed for Grays Athletic on a free transfer in May 2005, ready for the start of the 2005–06 season. He went on to make 40 Conference National appearances scoring 13 goals over two seasons.

In November 2006, he spent a month on loan at Oxford United, making three Conference appearances, but failing to score. Former Grays Athletic manager, Mark Stimson, signed Slabber for Stevenage Borough in December 2006 from Grays.

Slabber was released by Stevenage on 17 May 2007, and signed for Conference South club Havant & Waterlooville two months later, ahead of Conference National side Halifax Town. He also had an unsuccessful trial at Rushden & Diamonds in July 2007. He scored his first Havant goal against newly formed Hayes & Yeading United, a game that Havant won 4–1. He was released from Havant & Waterlooville in October 2008 having made 29 appearances, scoring twice in the Conference South, before re-joining Grays Athletic.

On his second debut for Grays, Slabber scored a hat-trick in their 7–0 win at home to Maldon Town in the Essex Senior Cup. Slabber scored the only goal in Grays' 1–0 win over Ebbsfleet United on 26 December 2008, with a header set-up from a pass by Wesley Thomas. His second goal for Grays in the Conference National during the 2008–09 season was in the 2–1 home victory against Altrincham on 7 March 2009, having met Bradley Hudson-Odoi's cross. Slabber scored in Grays' 2–1 victory over Mansfield Town, scoring with a header from a cross supplied by George Beavan. He re-signed for Grays in July, after leaving at the end of the season.

Slabber joined Conference South club Woking on 31 December 2009, signing until the end of the 2009–10 season.

At the end of the 2009–10 season he joined Eastleigh, for whom he scored a hat-trick in only his second game (against Dorchester Town). Slabber scored four goals for Eastleigh in a 5–0 Conference South win against Staines Town on his 41st appearance for the club. Slabber won Player's Player and Manager's Player of the Year in the 2010–11 season having made 48 appearances and scoring 25 goals.

On 20 March 2012, Slabber signed for Chelmsford City for an undisclosed fee, after seeing an initial bid for his services turned down by Eastleigh. On his debut for Chelmsford, on the same day he signed for the club, Slabber scored in a 2–1 win away to Dorchester. On 3 November 2012, Slabber scored Chelmsford's third goal in a 3–1 FA Cup upset against Essex rivals Colchester United. On 2 February 2013, Slabber scored his only hat-trick for Chelmsford, coming against Hayes & Yeading United in a 6–2 win.

It was announced on 8 May 2013 that Slabber had joined Sutton United for the 2013–14 season, before leaving the club for Bromley at the end of the season. He scored his first goal for Bromley in a 4–2 win over Maidenhead United on 25 August, after coming on as a substitute. In October, he joined fellow Conference South club Farnborough on a month's loan, in a bid to regain form and match fitness.

In July 2015, Slabber signed for Conference South side Hemel Hempstead Town, before signing for Conference South side Sutton United on loan until the end of the season in March 2016.

He linked up with a former manager, Mark Goldberg when he signed for Welling United on 26 May 2016. Slabber went on loan to Bishop's Stortford during the 2016–17 season, playing four games.

Slabber returned to Grays Athletic on 14 June 2017. He was released in 2018 and subsequently retired.

== International career ==
Slabber has represented England at both under-18 and under-19 levels. He has also been called up, and played for the England Nation Game XI against Belgium in the European Challenge Trophy.

== Honours ==
- FA Trophy: 2006, 2007
- Conference South: 2014–15
