= Carlos Roca (English footballer) =

English footballer

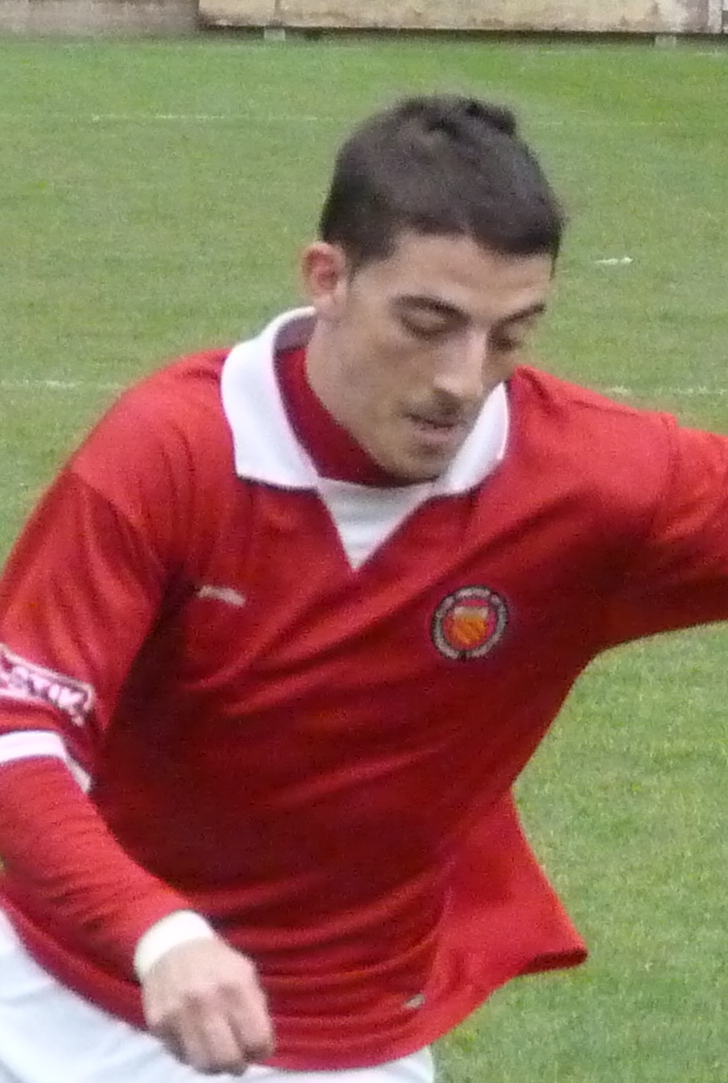
- Roca playing for FC United of Manchester in 2011

Personal information
- Full name: Carlos Jose Roca
- Date of birth: 4 September 1984 (age 42)
- Place of birth: Manchester, England
- Position: Midfielder

Youth career
- –2003: Oldham Athletic

Senior career*
Years	Team	Apps	(Gls)
2003–2004	Oldham Athletic	7	(0)
2004–2005	Carlisle United	10	(0)
2005	→ Northwich Victoria (loan)	3	(0)
2005–2007	Northwich Victoria		
2007–2008	Stalybridge Celtic	26	(5)
2008	Altrincham	7	(0)
2008–2013	FC United of Manchester	165	(33)
2013	Chorley	2	(0)
2014	Rhyl	14	(1)
- * Club domestic league appearances and goals as of 1 July 2014

Carlos Jose Roca (born 4 September 1984) is an English football midfielder who played in the Football League for Oldham Athletic.

== Career ==
Roca started his playing career at Oldham Athletic, and made his senior debut in August 2003 in the Division Two defeat at home to Brighton & Hove Albion. After manager Iain Dowie moved on to Crystal Palace, Roca played little first-team football. He was released at the end of the season, and moved on to Carlisle United working under Paul Simpson. Roca played regularly at first, but was unable to force his way back into the first team after a knee injury. He spent time on loan at fellow Conference club Northwich Victoria, and after Carlisle won promotion back to the Football League, he was released.

He then joined Northwich on a permanent contract, and helped them win the 2005–06 Conference North title and reach the semi-final of the 2006–07 FA Trophy. Transfer-listed in July 2007, he was expected to join Droylsden but instead signed for Stalybridge Celtic. He moved on to Altrincham before the end of the season, and then joined FC United of Manchester. Roca spent five years at FC United, making over 200 appearances for the club in all competitions. After a brief spell at Chorley, he spent the second half of the 2013–14 season in the Welsh Premier League with Rhyl.

As of 2019, Roca was managing director of Pro Football Academy, a football coaching and services provider that won the New Business of the Year Award at the 2019 Lloyds Bank National Business Awards.

== Personal life ==
Born in England, Roca is of Spanish descent through his father who is from Palma de Mallorca.
