= Stuart Whitehead =

English footballer

Personal information
- Full name: Stuart David Whitehead
- Date of birth: 17 July 1976 (age 50)
- Place of birth: Bromsgrove, England
- Height: 5 ft 11 in (1.80 m)
- Positions: Right-back; centre back

Youth career
- –1994: Bromsgrove Rovers

Senior career*
Years	Team	Apps	(Gls)
1994–1995	Bromsgrove Rovers		
1995–1998	Bolton Wanderers	0	(0)
1998–2002	Carlisle United	152	(2)
2002–2003	Darlington	23	(0)
2003–2004	Telford United	37	(1)
2004–2006	Shrewsbury Town	63	(0)
2006–2008	Kidderminster Harriers	60	(0)
2008–2012	AFC Telford United	76	(0)
2012–2013	Worcester City	39	(0)
Total		450	(3)

Managerial career
- 2009: AFC Telford United (caretaker)
- * Club domestic league appearances and goals

Stuart David Whitehead (born 17 July 1976) is an English former footballer. He played as a right-back or centre-back.

== Career ==
Born in Bromsgrove, Whitehead began his career at his hometown club Bromsgrove Rovers. After a season with the club, he joined then-Premiership Bolton Wanderers in 1995 on a free transfer.

Bolton were relegated in his first season with them, but won promotion back to the Premier League in the following season. After another top-flight season, Bolton and Whitehead parted company, with Whitehead never appearing for the club.

A regular starting role at Carlisle United followed, with Carlisle spending the whole period near the bottom of the Football League. He appeared in the famous Jimmy Glass game against Plymouth Argyle, in which the goalkeeper scored in the 94th minute to keep Carlisle United in the Football League. A ten-month spell at Darlington followed before Whitehead dropped down to the Football Conference in August 2003 for a season with Telford United. Telford, and their chairman, were to go bankrupt at the end of the season, so Whitehead made the short move to newly promoted (to League Two) Shrewsbury Town.

In his two seasons with the club, Whitehead became Shrewsbury's first-choice right-back, making 70 appearances for the Shropshire club. However, on 14 April 2006 he was released by Shrewsbury to allow the emergence of Gavin Cadwallader. Whitehead agreed to join Conference club Kidderminster Harriers on a two-year contract in the summer of 2006.

In his first season Whitehead played well and was a vital part of the FA Trophy run to the finals. He led the team out on 12 May hoping to lift the trophy but, unfortunately he will go down in history as the first captain to lose a competitive match at Wembley.

Whitehead left Kidderminster by mutual consent on 31 January 2008 and subsequently made his return to the New Bucks Head, signing an 18-month deal with Conference North side AFC Telford United.

At the start of the 2008/2009 season, Whitehead was named as the new AFC Telford United captain. At the end of the 2009/2010 season, following the dismissal of Rob Smith, Whitehead was named caretaker manager for Telford's final game of the season, a 3–1 defeat away to Vauxhall Motors. He left Telford in January 2012, joining Worcester City the next day.
