= Santos Gaia =

Brazilian footballer (born 1978)

Personal information
- Full name: Márcio dos Santos Gaia
- Date of birth: 8 September 1978 (age 48)
- Place of birth: São Mateus, Brazil
- Height: 6 ft 0 in (1.83 m)
- Position: Defender

Senior career*
| Years | Team | Apps | (Gls) |
| 2002–2006 | Exeter City | 122 | (12) |
| 2006–2007 | Stevenage Borough | 47 | (1) |
| 2007–2008 | → Grays Athletic (loan) | 2 | (0) |
| 2008 | Grays Athletic | 6 | (0) |
| 2008 | → Halifax Town (loan) | 9 | (0) |
| 2008–2009 | Weymouth | 25 | (0) |
| 2009 | Crawley Town | 3 | (1) |
| 2009–2010 | Truro City | | |

International career
- Brazil U17
- * Club domestic league appearances and goals as of 03:09, 9 March 2009 (UTC)

Márcio dos Santos Gaia, commonly known as Santos Gaia, (born 8 September 1978) is a Brazilian footballer from São Mateus who plays as a defender.

== Career ==
Gaia, a defender, holds a Spanish passport (gained through marriage), which means he does not require a work permit to play in England. He signed for English side Exeter City in August 2002. He made 33 League Two appearances during his first season, which saw Exeter relegated from the Football League, however he remained with the club despite the exodus of many other first team members. The 2004–05 season saw him among the club's top scorers, unusually for a defender, with nine goals, all of which were scored in the first half of the season. In January 2005 he played in Exeter's memorable 0–0 draw at Old Trafford in the FA Cup.

On 26 June 2006, Gaia signed a two-year contract with Conference side Stevenage Borough where he was a first-team regular. During his time at Broadhall Way, he was part of the side that defeated Kidderminster Harriers in the 2007 FA Trophy final. He had previously scored an important goal in the semi-final against future club Grays Athletic to put his club through to the final. He scored one other goal for Stevenage in a 4–2 defeat to Forest Green Rovers on 25 September 2007.

Santos Gaia signed for Grays Athletic on loan on 22 November 2007 until 1 January 2008, when the deal was made permanent for £10,000.

He signed for Halifax Town on loan until the end of the 2007–08 season, where he made a total of nine Conference National appearances. The defender was released from Grays Athletic at the end of the season along with Nicky Eyre, Danny Knowles, Cameron Mawer and Charley Hearn.

On 20 May 2008, Gaia signed for Weymouth alongside Pierre Joseph-Dubois.

On 26 February 2009, Gaia joined Crawley Town, signing until the end of the season. He scored his first goal for Crawley on 8 March 2009, ironically against former club Weymouth. In June 2009, Gaia turned down a sizeable offer from Rushden & Diamonds and joined Cornish side Truro City instead.

== Honours ==
- FA Trophy: 2007
