= Bertie Cozic =

French footballer (born 1978)

Personal information
- Full name: Bertrand Edern Cozic
- Date of birth: 18 May 1978 (age 48)
- Place of birth: Quimper, France
- Position: Midfielder

Senior career*
Years	Team	Apps	(Gls)
2002–2003	Team Bath		
2003–2004	Cheltenham Town	7	(1)
2004	Hereford United	3	(0)
2004–2005	Northampton Town	14	(0)
2005	Kidderminster Harriers	15	(0)
2005–2006	Aldershot Town	2	(0)
2005–2006	Team Bath	27	(3)
2006–2011	Exeter City	106	(3)
2013	Tiverton Town	1	(0)
Total		175	(7)
- * Club domestic league appearances and goals

Bertrand Edern Cozic (born 18 May 1978), known as Bertie Cozic, is a French former professional footballer who played as a midfielder.

== Career ==
Born in Quimper, Finistère, Cozic first came to England with Team Bath F.C., the football team of the University of Bath, in 2002. After a successful first season, he moved into the professional game, having spells with Cheltenham (where he scored his first goal in professional football against Swansea City), Hereford, Northampton, Kidderminster and Aldershot, before returning to Team Bath in late 2005.

In the summer of 2006, Cozic transferred to Exeter City, following former University of Bath manager Paul Tisdale after he was newly named manager of Exeter City. He signed a new one-year contract with Exeter City in June 2009. He signed a new six-month deal with Exeter City in June 2010 with the option of a further six months. Cozic took up the option of a further six months contract in January 2011. He was also the owner of Gourmandine crepe-café on Catherine Street, Exeter until selling his share of the business in 2013 to take up a new venture in Food produce. Cozic announced his retirement from football in May 2011 to concentrate on his restaurant business, which his former club confirmed later that month.

On 8 July 2013, Cozic announced that he was coming out of retirement and would be signing a one-year deal with Tiverton Town. On 23 August it was announced that Cozic had been released by Tiverton after featuring just once as a substitute.

== Career statistics ==
Appearances and goals by club, season and competition
Club	Season	League			FA Cup		League Cup		Other		Total	
Club	Season	Division	Apps	Goals	Apps	Goals	Apps	Goals	Apps	Goals	Apps	Goals
Team Bath	2002–03				1	0	–		–		1	0
Cheltenham	2003–04	Third Division	7	1	–		1	0	–		8	1
Hereford	2004	Football Conference	3	0	–		–		1	0	4	0
Northampton	2004–05	League Two	14	0	2	0	1	0	2	0	19	0
Kidderminster	2005	League Two	15	0	–		–		–		15	0
Aldershot	2005–06	Football Conference	2	0	–		–		–		2	0
Team Bath	2005–06				–		–		–			
Exeter City	2006–07	Football Conference	30	1	1	0	–		1	0	32	1
Exeter City	2007–08		16	0	1	0	–		1	0	18	0
Exeter City	2008–09	League Two	20	0	1	0	–		–		21	0
Exeter City	2009–10	League One	29	2	2	0	1	0	1	0	33	2
Exeter City	2010–11	League One	11	0	0	0	0	0	1	0	12	0
Exeter City	Total		106	3	5	0	1	0	4	0	116	3
Career total			147	4	8	0	3	0	7	0	165	4
