= Michael Carr (English footballer) =

English footballer

Personal information
- Full name: Michael Andrew Carr
- Date of birth: 6 December 1983 (age 42)
- Place of birth: Crewe, England
- Position: Midfielder

Team information
- Current team: Alsager Town

Senior career*
Years	Team	Apps	(Gls)
2001–2005	Macclesfield Town	14	(1)
2005–2008	Northwich Victoria	155	(39)
2008–2009	Morecambe	12	(0)
2008	→ Northwich Victoria (loan)	5	(1)
2009	Kidderminster Harriers	6	(2)
2009–2010	Stalybridge Celtic	32	(5)
2010–2011	Nantwich Town	33	(6)
2011	FC United of Manchester	25	(4)
2011–2013	Stafford Rangers	57	(7)
2013–2014	Kidsgrove Athletic	18	(4)
2014	Alsager Town	6	(1)

International career
2005–2007	England C	12	(1)
- * Club domestic league appearances and goals as of 19:07, 11 November 2013 (UTC)

Michael Andrew Carr (born 6 December 1983 in Crewe, England) is an English former footballer.

== Career ==
Carr has previously played for Macclesfield Town, Northwich Victoria, Morecambe and Kidderminster Harriers . He has been capped seven times for England at semi-professional level, scoring one goal. In his time at Northwich Michael was known for his terrific engine and box to box midfield play which gave him the status as a fans favourite, this then led to interest from football league clubs. He then eventually left Vics to sign for Morecambe in a deal which would see Carr go full-time. After his move Carr found a regular starting place in the side hard to come by and this led to a months loan at former club Northwich, despite returning to Morecambe Carr was released from his contract and snapped up by Kidderminster Harriers. After Harriers decided not to retain his services at the end of the 08–09 season due to financial cutbacks Carr was found looking for a club. On 9 July 2009 Carr signed for Stalybridge Celtic and linked up with former boss Steve Burr. Carr then joined Nantwich Town. In July 2011 it was announced that he had signed for FC United of Manchester of the Northern Premier League Premier Division where he stayed until he left the club at the beginning of December. He then signed for Stafford Rangers FC on 3 December 2011. He made his Stafford debut on Wednesday 7 December 2011 vs Witton Albion in the Dootson Cup (Evo-Stik North League Cup), and scored after just 12 minutes with a header.
