= Aggborough Stadium =

English football stadium

Coordinates: 52°22′50″N 2°14′34″W

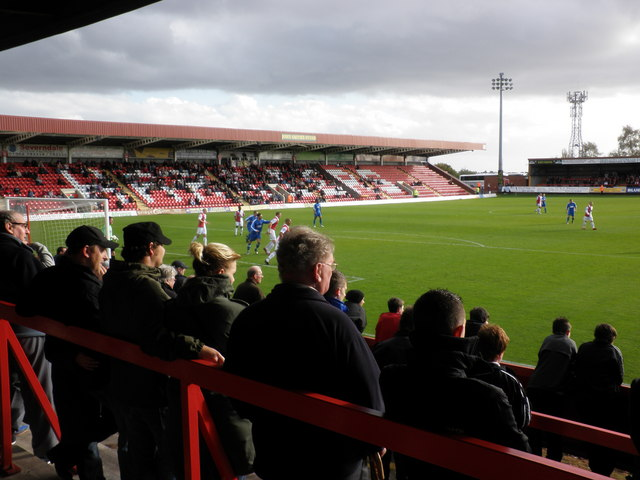
- Interactive map of Aggborough Stadium
- Location: Kidderminster, England
- Owner: Kidderminster Harriers
- Operator: Kidderminster Harriers
- Capacity: 6,444
- Surface: Grass
- Record attendance: 9,155

Construction
- Opened: 1884

Tenants
- Kidderminster Harriers (1886–present); Worcester City (2013–2016); Wolverhampton Wanderers U23s (2020–present)

Aggborough Stadium is a football stadium in Kidderminster, England. It is the home ground of Kidderminster Harriers, and has a capacity of 7,000, of which 3,140 can be seated. The ground was also the home of Worcester City between 2013 and 2016.

== History ==
The ground was opened in May 1890 with a single grandstand on the western touchline, and initially included a banked running track. In 1935 a new 460-seat grandstand was built, and by World War II covered areas had been created on the east and southern sides of the ground.

After the war the running track was replaced by a cycle track. On 27 November 1948, the ground's record attendance of 9,155 was set for an FA Cup first round replay against Hereford United. On 14 September 1955 Aggborough Stadium became the first ground to host a floodlit FA Cup match, when Harriers faced Brierley Hill Alliance in a preliminary round replay, with Kidderminster winning 4–2.

A new East Stand was built in 1979, and terracing was created all around the pitch in 1983. The ground was rebuilt in the 1990s, with the cycle track removed and a new Main Stand built in 1994. Covered terracing was added at each end of the pitch. When Kidderminster won their first Conference title in 1994, Aggborough Stadium was not deemed to meet Football League standards and as a result Kidderminster were denied promotion to Division Three. By the time Kidderminster won their second Conference title six years later, the ground had been upgraded to Football League standards and promotion was allowed. In 2003, the new 2,040-seat cantilever stand was built to replace the old East Stand.

On 30 January 2013, it was announced that Worcester would ground-share with Kidderminster Harriers at their Aggborough ground from the 2013–14 season.

Worcester City decided to terminate their arrangement with Kidderminster and move to Bromsgrove and groundshare the Victoria Ground with Bromsgrove Sporting F.C. from the start of the 2016–17 season.
