= Marvin Williams (footballer) =

English association football player

Personal information
- Full name: Marvin Travis Williams
- Date of birth: 12 August 1987 (age 39)
- Place of birth: Sydenham, England
- Height: 5 ft 9 in (1.75 m)
- Positions: Winger; forward

Youth career
- 2003–2005: Millwall

Senior career*
Years	Team	Apps	(Gls)
2005–2007	Millwall	51	(7)
2007	→ Torquay United (loan)	2	(1)
2007–2008	Yeovil Town	23	(0)
2008–2009	Brentford	34	(0)
2009	Torquay United	4	(0)
2010	Östersund	7	(1)
2010	Stevenage	1	(0)
2011	Hemel Hempstead Town	21	(4)
2011–2012	Salisbury City	27	(10)
2012	Eastleigh	11	(1)
2012–2015	Sutton United	50	(12)
2014–2015	→ Tonbridge Angels (loan)	25	(3)
Total		256	(39)
- * Club domestic league appearances and goals

Marvin Travis Williams (born 12 August 1987) is an English former footballer who played as a winger and forward.

Williams began his career as a trainee at Millwall, progressing through the club's youth system and signing his first professional contract in January 2006. He made 55 appearances for Millwall over two years, including a brief loan to Torquay United in March 2007, before joining Yeovil Town ahead of the 2007–08 season. He spent one season at Yeovil before moving to Brentford in June 2008, contributing to the club's promotion to League One.

He subsequently had a brief permanent spell at Torquay, followed by a stint in Sweden with Östersund in 2010 and a brief non-contract period at Stevenage. Williams later played for non-League clubs Hemel Hempstead Town, Salisbury City, Eastleigh, and Sutton United, including a loan to Tonbridge Angels during the 2014–15 season. He retired from playing in 2015 due to a persistent Achilles tendon injury.

== Early life ==
Williams was born in Sydenham, London and educated at Addey and Stanhope School.

== Career ==
=== Millwall ===
Williams began his career at Millwall at the age of nine, progressing through the club's youth system before making his first-team debut on 10 December 2005, coming on as a substitute in a 1–0 defeat to Coventry City. He scored his first professional goal on 2 January 2006, the winner in a 2–1 home victory against Derby County, controlling David Livermore's pass before beating Lee Camp in the Derby goal. Five days later, Williams signed his first professional contract, just hours before the club's FA Cup tie against Premier League club Everton. Williams subsequently made his first start against Everton, scoring just before half-time in a 1–1 draw. He later described the goal as one of the highlights of his career. He scored his third goal for Millwall in the club's 2–1 victory against Luton Town at The Den on 4 March 2006. Williams' goal came in injury-time, one which was described as "priceless" due to Millwall's precarious league position. Williams played 24 games during the 2005–06 season, scoring five times as Millwall were relegated to League One.

He scored his first goal of the 2006–07 season on 26 August 2006, scoring with a "low shot" to give Millwall the lead against Cheltenham Town, although they went on to lose the match 3–2. Williams went six months without scoring, ending his goal drought in Millwall's 2–1 away win at Oldham Athletic on 17 February 2007. After being left out of the squad for Millwall's 2–0 home win over Cheltenham Town on 3 March 2007, he requested a loan move to start playing regular first-team football. Three days later, on 6 March 2007, Williams joined League Two club Torquay United on loan for the remainder of the season. He scored on his debut in a 3–0 home victory against Wycombe Wanderers on 10 March 2007. After playing twice for Torquay, Millwall took advantage of a recall clause that stated Williams could be recalled after 28 days when it was confirmed that the club's top scorer Darren Byfield would miss the rest of the season. He was recalled on 4 April 2007. Williams played 31 games for Millwall during the 2006–07 season, scoring three goals. In total, he made 55 appearances and scored eight goals during his two years with the club.

=== Yeovil Town ===
Ahead of the 2007–08 season, on 26 July 2007, Williams signed a two-year contract with League One club Yeovil Town for an undisclosed fee. On joining the club, Williams stated Yeovil manager Russell Slade "was really persistent and was the one that really came in and pushed for me. From there I always knew that I would join Yeovil". He made his debut for Yeovil in the club's 1–0 away defeat to Huddersfield Town on 11 August 2007, playing the opening 74 minutes. Williams made just nine starting appearances for Yeovil during the season, with an ankle injury sustained in training in September 2007 ruling him out for three months. He played 24 times for Yeovil during the season.

=== Brentford ===
Williams joined League Two club Brentford on 27 June 2008, signing an initial one-year contract. He arrived for a nominal fee, despite having a year remaining on his Yeovil contract. He made his debut in the club's first game of the season, a 1–0 loss away to Bury, playing 75 minutes before being substituted for Moses Ademola. A week later, Williams provided assists for Nathan Elder and Charlie MacDonald in Brentford's 4–0 victory over Grimsby Town. He scored his first goal for Brentford in the club's 2–2 Football League Trophy draw with Luton Town at Kenilworth Road on 7 October 2008, a match in which Brentford went on to lose on penalties. He made 37 appearances and scored twice during the club's 2008–09 season, as Brentford were crowned League Two champions.

Shortly after the conclusion of the season, on 9 May 2009, Williams was transfer-listed by Brentford manager Andy Scott. The decision to transfer-list Williams was mutually agreed, with Scott stating that the player's first-team opportunities would be limited. Despite this, Williams remained at Brentford a month into the 2009–10 season, eventually leaving by mutual consent to sign a six-month contract with Torquay United on a free transfer, the club he had previously spent time with on loan. After making four appearances for Torquay, Williams was released in December 2009.

=== Östersunds FK ===
Williams was affected by an FA rule which prohibited players from representing more than two clubs in a season; Williams had already made one six-minute substitute appearance for Brentford and also played on loan at Torquay United during the 2009–10 season. Due to this, he had to look for first-team football either outside of the UK or within the non-League football pyramid.

He joined Swedish Third Division club Östersund in April 2010. Williams signed for the club after English manager Lee Makel contacted him about a short-term opportunity. He made his debut in a 7–1 away win in the Swedish Cup second round against Umedalens IF on 11 April 2010. During his time at Östersund, he played alongside several other English players, including Joe Holt, Richard Offiong, and Jon Routledge. He made his first league start the following week, playing the full 90 minutes in a 1–0 defeat to Vasalunds IF. Williams went on to make nine appearances, scoring his only goal in his final match for the club, a 1–1 draw with Valsta Syrianska IK on 5 June 2010. He left the club later that month, describing it as "a really interesting experience culturally".

=== Return to England ===
The 2010–11 season meant that Williams was eligible to return to the Football League, and he subsequently featured for League Two club Stevenage's reserve team in September 2010. After a short trial period, he signed for the club on non-contract terms on 2 October 2010. On the same day as his signing was announced, Williams made his first-team debut for Stevenage in the club's 2–0 defeat to Wycombe Wanderers, coming on as a 73rd-minute substitute in the match. Williams left the club after two weeks, having made one appearance.

He then joined Hemel Hempstead Town in February 2011 for the remainder of the 2010–11 season. He continued to play for Hemel until he was offered a full-time contract by Conference South club Salisbury City, signing on 14 November 2011. Salisbury manager Darrell Clarke commented on Williams' "experience and great pedigree" as key factors in the move, also noting that Williams was "delighted" to be back playing full-time football. A day after joining Salisbury, Williams scored two goals on his debut after coming on as a second-half substitute in a 4–3 defeat to Welling United. Williams scored his first professional hat-trick in Salisbury's 3–1 win over Sutton United on 21 April 2012, the club's final home league game of the 2011–12 season. He ended the season having scored 10 goals in 28 appearances.

=== Sutton United ===
Ahead of the 2012–13 season, Williams signed for Eastleigh, also of the Conference South, on an initial two-year contract. After making eleven appearances, scoring once in a 3–0 away win against Havant & Waterlooville, he was released from his contract in October 2012, and subsequently signed for Sutton United. Williams made his debut for Sutton in a 2–1 victory over Truro City on 27 October 2012, playing the first 75 minutes of the match before being replaced by Paul Telfer. He scored his first goal for Sutton on 1 January 2013 in a 2–0 away victory over Bromley. Having scored twice in his first five months at Sutton, Williams found a rich vein of goalscoring form in April 2013 to end the 2012–13 season. This run included three separate braces in victories against Farnborough, Hayes & Yeading United and Bath City and meant that Williams ended the season with nine goals in seven matches, with Sutton narrowly missing out on a play-off place despite winning their last eight league games. In his opening season with the club, he scored 11 times in 30 matches. The following season, Williams was limited to 16 appearances due to injury, scoring once.

Having started the opening month of the 2014–15 season making six of his seven appearances for Sutton from the substitutes' bench, Williams was loaned to Isthmian League Premier Division club Tonbridge Angels on a one-month deal in October 2014. The loan agreement was intended to aid Williams in his recovery from long-term injury. He made his debut for Tonbridge in a 1–0 home defeat to Billericay Town on 8 November 2014, coming on as a 68th-minute substitute. The loan deal was later extended for the remainder of the 2014–15 season, and he went on to make 25 appearances for the club, scoring three goals. This included a goal in a 2–2 draw with Dulwich Hamlet on 25 April 2015. It proved to be his final appearance as a persistent Achilles tendon problem that had affected him during the final two seasons of his career ultimately forced his retirement.

== Style of play ==
Williams was originally deployed as a striker when he first broke into the Millwall first team in 2006. Towards the latter stages of the 2005–06 season he was often used as a second striker alongside Ben May, and used his quick turn of pace to "cause opposition defences problems". When Williams signed for Brentford in 2008, manager Andy Scott described him as "quick and direct", adding that "he can play wide on the right or up front, he has a lot of potential".

== Coaching career ==
In 2014, Williams established a football academy at Sutton United, and his role has entailed overseeing "the programme, from coaching to taking matchdays, arranging the logistics of a game as well as organising fixtures and recruitment". In addition to his work at Sutton United, Williams also serves as director of football for AF Global in London, working across school-based programmes and player development pathways.

== Personal life ==
In late 2010, he undertook a personal training course. Williams has two children.

== Career statistics ==
Appearances and goals by club, season and competition
Club	Season	League			National cup (Note: Includes FA Cup, Svenska Cupen)		League Cup		Other		Total	
Club	Season	Division	Apps	Goals	Apps	Goals	Apps	Goals	Apps	Goals	Apps	Goals
Millwall	2005–06	Championship	22	4	2	1	0	0	0	0	24	5
Millwall	2006–07	League One	29	3	1	0	0	0	1 (Note: Appearance in Football League Trophy)	0	31	3
Millwall	Total		51	7	3	1	0	0	1	0	55	8
Torquay United (loan)	2006–07	League Two	2	1	0	0	0	0	0	0	2	1
Yeovil Town	2007–08	League One	23	0	0	0	1	0	0	0	24	0
Brentford	2008–09	League Two	34	0	1	1	1	0	1	1	37	2
Brentford	2009–10	League One	0	0	―		1	0	0	0	1	0
Brentford	Total		34	0	1	1	2	0	1	1	38	2
Torquay United	2009–10	League Two	4	0	0	0	―		0	0	4	0
Östersund	2010	Swedish Division 1	7	1	2	0	―		―		9	1
Stevenage	2010–11	League Two	1	0	0	0	0	0	0	0	1	0
Salisbury City	2011–12	Conference South	25	10	3	0	―		0	0	28	10
Eastleigh	2012–13	Conference South	11	1	0	0	―		0	0	11	1
Sutton United	2012–13	Conference South	27	11	0	0	―		3 (Note: Appearances in FA Trophy)	0	30	11
Sutton United	2013–14	Conference South	16	1	0	0	―		0	0	16	1
Sutton United	2014–15	Conference South	7	0	0	0	―		0	0	7	0
Sutton United	Total		50	12	0	0	0	0	3	0	53	12
Tonbridge Angels (loan)	2014–15	IL Premier Division	25	3	0	0	―		0	0	25	3
Career total			235	35	9	2	3	0	5	1	251	38

== Honours ==
Brentford

- Football League Two: 2008–09
