= 2005–06 Millwall F.C. season =

Millwall
2005–06 season
- Chairman: Peter de Savary
- Manager: Colin Lee (until 21 December); Dave Tuttle (from 21 December to 20 April); Tony Burns and Alan McLeary (from 20 April)
- Stadium: The Den
- Championship: 23rd (relegated)
- FA Cup: Third round
- League Cup: Fourth round
- Top goalscorer: League: Ben May (10); All: Ben May (11)
- Average home league attendance: 9,529

During the 2005–06 English football season, Millwall F.C. competed in the Football League Championship.

== Season summary ==
Former Watford, Wolverhampton Wanderers and Walsall manager Colin Lee replaced Steve Claridge as manager of Millwall, but lasted only five months in charge. On 21 December, with the club bottom of the Championship, he became the club's director of football (he would leave the club altogether in February) and was replaced as manager by 32-year-old player Dave Tuttle, who had no previous experience in management, on a short-term contract until the end of the season. Millwall experienced a very difficult season and their relegation to League One was confirmed on 17 April with a 2–0 loss against Southampton. Tuttle resigned three days later. Goalkeeping coach Tony Burns and former Millwall manager Alan McLeary took charge for the two remaining games of the season.

== Final league table ==
Pos	Team	Pld	W	D	L	GF	GA	GD	Pts	Promotion, qualification or relegation
20	Derby County	46	10	20	16	53	67	−14	50	
21	Queens Park Rangers	46	12	14	20	50	65	−15	50	
22	Crewe Alexandra (R)	46	9	15	22	57	86	−29	42	Relegation to Football League One
23	Millwall (R)	46	8	16	22	35	62	−27	40	Relegation to Football League One
24	Brighton & Hove Albion (R)	46	7	17	22	39	71	−32	38	Relegation to Football League One

Updated to match(es) played on 2 December 2011. Source: RSSSF
Rules for classification: 1) points; 2) goal difference; 3) number of goals scored.
(R) Relegated

== Results ==
Millwall's score comes first

=== Legend ===
Win	Draw	Loss

=== Football League Championship ===
Date	Opponent	Venue	Result	Attendance	Scorers
7 August 2005	Leeds United	A	1–2	20,440	Hutchison
9 August 2005	Coventry City	H	0–0	8,344	
13 August 2005	Stoke City	H	0–1	8,668	
20 August 2005	Reading	A	0–5	14,225	
27 August 2005	Ipswich Town	H	1–2	8,277	May
29 August 2005	Luton Town	A	1–2	8,220	May
10 September 2005	Preston North End	H	1–2	7,674	Hutchison
13 September 2005	Wolverhampton Wanderers	A	2–1	21,897	Wright, Hayles
17 September 2005	Sheffield Wednesday	A	2–1	19,184	Hayles, Asaba
24 September 2005	Cardiff City	H	0–0	9,524	
27 September 2005	Queens Park Rangers	H	1–1	10,322	Hayles
30 September 2005	Hull City	A	1–1	18,761	Asaba
15 October 2005	Norwich City	A	1–1	25,095	Williams
18 October 2005	Sheffield United	H	0–4	9,148	
22 October 2005	Southampton	H	0–2	10,759	
30 October 2005	Plymouth Argyle	A	0–0	11,764	
1 November 2005	Burnley	A	1–2	10,698	Wright
5 November 2005	Crewe Alexandra	H	1–3	8,120	Hayles (pen)
19 November 2005	Sheffield United	A	2–2	22,292	Dyer (2)
22 November 2005	Norwich City	H	1–0	7,814	Elliott
26 November 2005	Leeds United	H	0–1	8,134	
3 December 2005	Crystal Palace	A	1–1	19,571	May
10 December 2005	Coventry City	A	0–1	16,156	
17 December 2005	Reading	H	0–2	12,920	
26 December 2005	Leicester City	A	1–1	22,520	McCarthy (own goal)
28 December 2005	Watford	H	0–0	8,450	
31 December 2005	Brighton & Hove Albion	A	2–1	6,847	May, Simpson
2 January 2006	Derby County	H	2–1	9,523	Elliott, Williams
14 January 2006	Preston North End	A	0–2	14,165	
21 January 2006	Wolverhampton Wanderers	H	0–0	9,905	
31 January 2006	Cardiff City	A	1–1	12,378	Powel
4 February 2006	Sheffield Wednesday	H	0–1	11,896	
11 February 2006	Queens Park Rangers	A	0–1	12,355	
14 February 2006	Hull City	H	1–1	7,108	Livermore
18 February 2006	Crystal Palace	H	1–1	12,296	May
25 February 2006	Stoke City	A	1–2	11,340	May
4 March 2006	Luton Town	H	2–1	9,871	May, Williams
11 March 2006	Ipswich Town	A	1–1	24,864	Livermore
18 March 2006	Leicester City	H	0–1	10,523	
25 March 2006	Watford	A	2–0	16,654	Asaba, May
1 April 2006	Brighton & Hove Albion	H	0–2	13,209	
8 April 2006	Derby County	A	0–1	24,415	
15 April 2006	Plymouth Argyle	H	1–1	9,183	Williams
17 April 2006	Southampton	A	0–2	22,043	
22 April 2006	Burnley	H	1–0	7,780	Williams
30 April 2006	Crewe Alexandra	A	2–4	5,945	May (2)

=== FA Cup ===
Round	Date	Opponent	Venue	Result	Attendance	Goalscorers
R3	7 January 2006	Everton	H	1–1	16,440	Williams
R3R	18 January 2006	Everton	A	0–1	25,800	

=== League Cup ===
Round	Date	Opponent	Venue	Result	Attendance	Goalscorers
R1	23 August 2005	Bristol Rovers	H	2–0	2,383	Hayles, Fangueiro
R2	20 September 2005	Yeovil Town	A	2–1	5,108	Dunne, Asaba
R3	25 October 2005	Mansfield Town	A	3–2	4,133	May, P Robinson, Livermore
R4	29 November 2005	Birmingham City	H	2–2 (lost 3–4 on pens)	7,732	Dunne, Elliott

== Players ==
=== First-team squad ===
Squad at end of season

Note: Flags indicate national team as defined under FIFA eligibility rules; some limited exceptions apply. Players may hold more than one non-FIFA nationality.

No.	Pos.	Nation	Player
1	GK	ENG	Andy Marshall
2	DF	ENG	Matt Lawrence
3	DF	ENG	Jamie Vincent (on loan from Yeovil Town)
4	MF	ENG	Marvin Elliott (Note: Elliott was born in Wandsworth, England, but also qualified to represent Jamaica internationally and made his international debut for Jamaica in October 2011.)
5	DF	ENG	Paul Robinson
6	DF	ENG	Mark Phillips
7	DF	IRL	Alan Dunne
8	MF	ENG	David Livermore
9	MF	POR	Carlos Fangueiro
10	FW	NED	Berry Powel
11	MF	IRL	Barry Cogan
12	DF	USA	Zak Whitbread (on loan from Liverpool)
13	GK	IRL	Colin Doyle (on loan from Birmingham City)
14	DF	ENG	Tony Craig

No.	Pos.	Nation	Player
15	MF	CAN	Josh Simpson
16	MF	ENG	Sammy Igoe
17	FW	ENG	Ben May
19	FW	ENG	Carl Asaba
20	MF	ENG	Jody Morris
21	FW	JAM	Barry Hayles (Note: Hayles was born in Lambeth, England, but also qualified to represent Jamaica internationally and made his international debut for Jamaica in June 2001, having previously represented the Cayman Islands internationally despite being ineligible to do so.)
22	FW	NIR	Kevin Braniff
24	FW	ENG	Joe Healy
26	MF	JAM	Trevor Robinson
29	DF	ENG	Philip Ifil (on loan from Tottenham Hotspur)
31	DF	ENG	Dean Pooley
32	FW	ENG	Marvin Williams
35	MF	ENG	Will Hendry

=== Left club during season ===
Note: Flags indicate national team as defined under FIFA eligibility rules; some limited exceptions apply. Players may hold more than one non-FIFA nationality.

No.	Pos.	Nation	Player
3	DF	ENG	Jamie Vincent (on loan from Derby County)
10	MF	SCO	Don Hutchison (Note: Hutchison was born in Gateshead, England, but also qualified to represent Scotland internationally through his father and represented Scotland at B level before making his international debut for Scotland in March 1999.) (to Coventry City)
12	DF	CAN	Adrian Serioux (to New York Red Bulls)
18	FW	ENG	John Sutton (to St Mirren)
18	MF	ENG	Lloyd Dyer (to Milton Keynes Dons)
19	FW	BEL	Bob Peeters (to Genk)
25	GK	IRL	Terry Masterson (to Bray Wanderers)

No.	Pos.	Nation	Player
25	MF	SCO	Colin Cameron (on loan from Wolverhampton Wanderers)
27	DF	ENG	Jason Rose (to Fisher Athletic)
28	DF	WAL	Ady Williams (Note: Williams was born in Reading, England, but also qualified to represent Wales internationally through his father and made his international debut for Wales in 1994.) (on loan from Coventry City)
30	MF	ENG	Jermaine Wright (on loan from Leeds United)
31	GK	WAL	Paul Jones (on loan from Wolverhampton Wanderers)
40	GK	ENG	Lenny Pidgeley (on loan from Chelsea)
55	FW	ENG	Bruce Dyer (Note: Dyer was born in Redbridge, England, and represented England at U-21 level, but also qualified to represent Montserrat internationally and made his international debut for Montserrat in September 2007.) (on loan from Stoke City)

=== Reserve squad ===
Note: Flags indicate national team as defined under FIFA eligibility rules; some limited exceptions apply. Players may hold more than one non-FIFA nationality.

No. / Pos. / Nation / Player; 23 / MF / ENG / Curtis Weston	No. / Pos. / Nation / Player; 27 / GK / ENG / Alan Brooks
