= 2006–07 Millwall F.C. season =

Millwall
2006–07 season
- Chairman: Peter de Savary (until October)
- Manager: Nigel Spackman (until 25 September); Willie Donachie (from 25 September)
- Stadium: The Den
- League One: 10th
- FA Cup: Second round
- League Cup: Third round
- Football League Trophy: Quarter-final
- Top goalscorer: League: All: Darren Byfield (16)
- Average home league attendance: 9,234

During the 2006–07 English football season, Millwall competed in Football League One.

== Final league table ==
Pos	Team	Pld	W	D	L	GF	GA	GD	Pts
8	Carlisle United	46	19	11	16	54	55	−1	68
9	Tranmere Rovers	46	18	13	15	58	53	+5	67
10	Millwall	46	19	9	18	59	62	−3	66
11	Doncaster Rovers	46	16	15	15	52	47	+5	63
12	Port Vale	46	18	6	22	64	65	−1	60

Rules for classification: In the Football League goals scored (GF) takes precedence over goal difference (GD).

== Results ==
Millwall's score comes first

=== League One ===
5 August 2006	Millwall	1–1	Yeovil Town	The Den
15:00	Byfield 82'		Gray 35'	Attendance: 10,012

8 August 2006	Leyton Orient	2–0	Millwall	Brisbane Road
19:45	Steele 45'; Alexander 78'			Attendance: 6,142

12 August 2006	Chesterfield	5–1	Millwall	Saltergate
15:00	Hall 13', 51'; Allison 24', 65'; Folan 32'		Braniff 72'	Attendance: 4,136

19 August 2006	Millwall	1–0	Oldham Athletic	The Den
15:00	Hübertz 79'			Attendance: 7,455

26 August 2006	Cheltenham Town	3–2	Millwall	Whaddon Road
15:00	McCann 14' (pen.); Odejayi 67'; Melligan 82'		McInnes 24'; Williams 45+3'	Attendance: 4,386

2 September 2006	Millwall	0–0	Blackpool	The Den
15:00				Attendance: 7,692

== Players ==
=== First-team squad ===
Squad at end of season

Note: Flags indicate national team as defined under FIFA eligibility rules; some limited exceptions apply. Players may hold more than one non-FIFA nationality.

No.	Pos.	Nation	Player
1	GK	ENG	Lenny Pidgeley
3	DF	ENG	Tony Craig
4	MF	ENG	Marvin Elliott (Note: Elliott was born in Wandsworth, England, but also qualifies to represent Jamaica internationally and would make his international debut for Jamaica in October 2011.)
5	DF	ENG	Paul Robinson
6	DF	USA	Zak Whitbread
7	DF	IRL	Alan Dunne
8	FW	ENG	Neil Harris
9	FW	ENG	Ben May
10	FW	JAM	Darren Byfield (Note: Byfield was born in Sutton Coldfield, England, but also qualified to represent Jamaica internationally and made his international debut for Jamaica in 2003.)
11	MF	POR	Filipe Morais
12	MF	ENG	Chris Hackett
13	GK	ENG	Chris Day
14	MF	ENG	Dave Brammer
15	FW	SCO	Tom Brighton

No.	Pos.	Nation	Player
16	MF	IRL	Ross Gaynor
17	DF	ENG	Danny Senda
20	MF	ENG	Jody Morris
21	FW	ENG	Gavin Grant
22	MF	ENG	Ryan Smith (on loan from Derby County)
24	MF	ENG	Neal Ardley
26	FW	ENG	Chris Zebroski
27	DF	ENG	Richard Shaw
28	DF	ENG	Mark Phillips
29	MF	FRA	Samy-Oyame Mawene
30	FW	DEN	Poul Hübertz
31	DF	FRA	Zoumana Bakayogo (Note: Bakayogo was born in Paris, France, but also qualifies to represent the Ivory Coast internationally and would represent them at U-23 level.)
32	MF	ENG	Marvin Williams
33	MF	GHA	Ali Fuseini

=== Left club during season ===
Note: Flags indicate national team as defined under FIFA eligibility rules; some limited exceptions apply. Players may hold more than one non-FIFA nationality.

No.	Pos.	Nation	Player
2	DF	SCO	Maurice Ross (to Viking)
8	MF	SCO	Derek McInnes (to St Johnstone)
14	DF	ENG	Dean Pooley (to Bohemians)
17	MF	ENG	Will Hendry (to Hayes)
19	GK	IRL	Alan Brooks (released)
19	DF	ENG	Charlie Lee (on loan from Tottenham Hotspur)

No.	Pos.	Nation	Player
22	FW	NIR	Kevin Braniff (to Portadown)
23	MF	IRL	Barry Cogan (to Barnet)
23	MF	ENG	Liam Trotter (on loan from Ipswich Town)
25	MF	ENG	Michael Bostwick (to Rushden & Diamonds)
35	FW	ENG	Danny Haynes (on loan from Ipswich Town)

=== Reserve squad ===
Note: Flags indicate national team as defined under FIFA eligibility rules; some limited exceptions apply. Players may hold more than one non-FIFA nationality.

No.	Pos.	Nation	Player
18	DF	ENG	Adam Cottrell
19	DF	NIR	Chris Casement (on loan from Ipswich Town)

No.	Pos.	Nation	Player
23	DF	ENG	Nathan Ashton (on loan from Charlton Athletic)
34	GK	ENG	Preston Edwards
