= 2008–09 Brentford F.C. season =

English football team season

Brentford
2008–09 season
- Chairman: Greg Dyke
- Manager: Andy Scott
- Stadium: Griffin Park
- League Two: 1st (promoted)
- FA Cup: Second round
- League Cup: First round
- Football League Trophy: Second round
- Top goalscorer: League: MacDonald (16); All: MacDonald (18)
- Highest home attendance: 10,642
- Lowest home attendance: 3,733
- Average home league attendance: 5,707
Home colours	Away colours

During the 2008–09 English football season, Brentford competed in Football League Two. The club finished the season as champions to win promotion to Football League One.

== Season summary ==
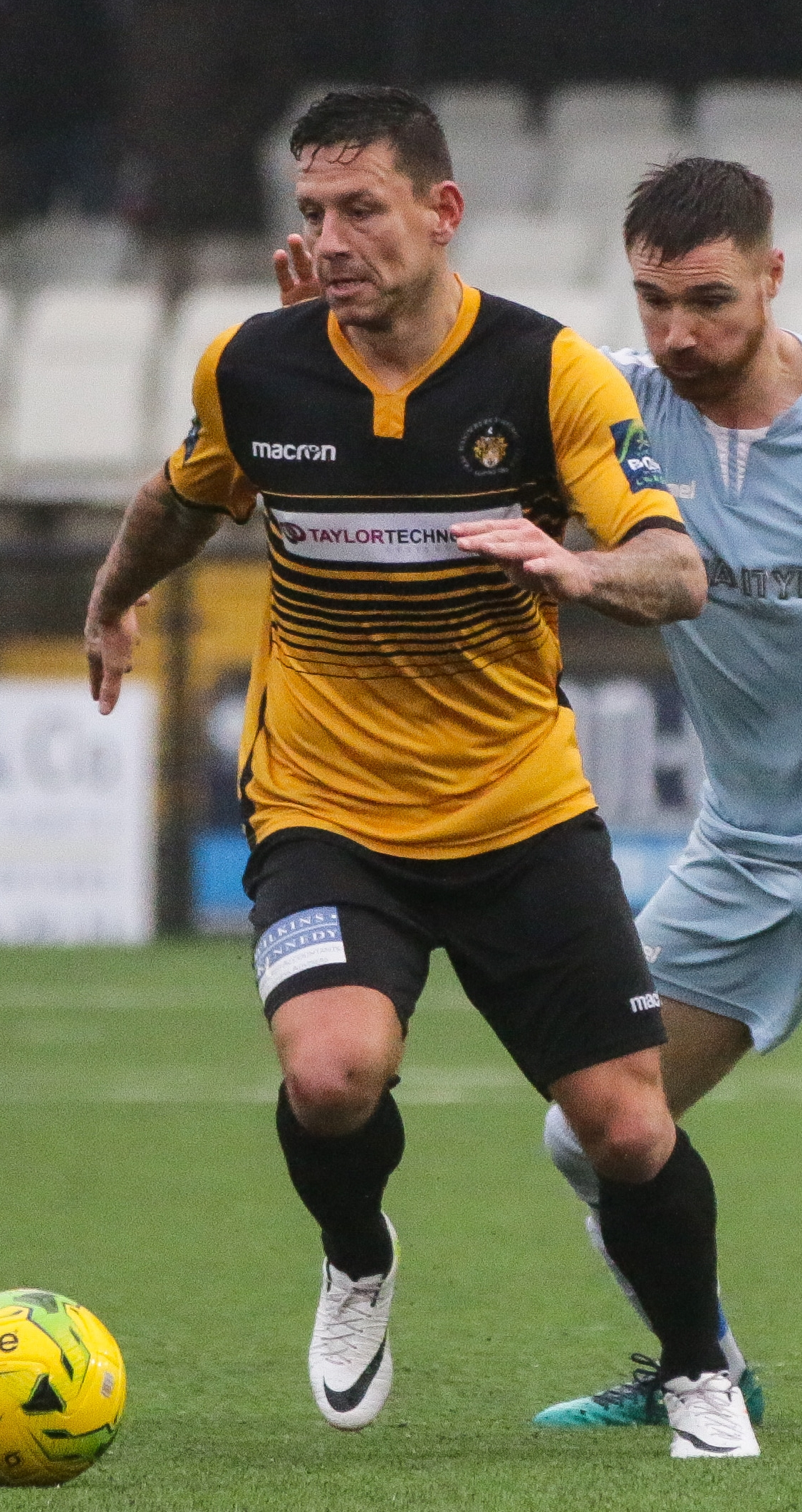
Forward Charlie MacDonald top-scored with 18 goals during the season.

The 2008–09 season was Brentford's second consecutive campaign in League Two, after relegation to the fourth tier for the first time in 9 years at the end of the 2006–07 season. Manager Andy Scott, who was beginning his first full season in the job, had signed a new five-year contract in April 2008. Despite working with a "mediocre budget", he brought in 12 new players – 8 on permanent transfers and four on loan. The pick of the signings were new forward Charlie MacDonald for an undisclosed fee from Southend United, central midfielder Marcus Bean from Blackpool on a free transfer and the re-signing on loan of goalkeeper Ben Hamer and central defender Alan Bennett from Reading until the end of the season. Signed from non-League football, left-sided full back and winger Sam Wood proved to be a hit and went on to win the Brentford Supporters' Player of the Year award.

The season began with consecutive defeats in the league and League Cup to Bury and Swansea City respectively, before an unbeaten run of 12 league matches put Brentford in the automatic promotion places. Midfielder Glenn Poole continued his good form from the previous season by scoring seven goals during the run. Two defeats in a row dropped the Bees to 9th in early November, before another unbeaten run put the club back in the automatic promotion places by 20 December. Brentford moved into second position after a 2–0 victory over Bournemouth on Boxing Day and consistently good results kept the club on the tail of leaders Wycombe Wanderers through January and early February 2009.

A 1–1 draw with Accrington Stanley on 10 February moved the Bees moved into top spot and consistently good results, aided by the goalscoring of January loan acquisition Jordan Rhodes, kept the club at the summit into mid-March. Brentford and Wycombe Wanderers faced off at Griffin Park on 14 March in front of a season-high crowd of 10,642 and the match yielded a 3–3 draw, with Aston Villa loanee Sam Williams "smashing in" late in proceedings to salvage a point for the Bees. Three days later, a home defeat to Chesterfield was Brentford's first loss for six weeks, but the club remained at the top of the table. Despite season-ending injuries to Jordan Rhodes, Nathan Elder, top scorer Charlie MacDonald and captain Kevin O'Connor, manager Andy Scott strengthened the squad with a new front line of loanees Billy Clarke and Damian Spencer. Central defender Darren Powell, who had played alongside Scott in Brentford's previous fourth-tier championship triumph a decade earlier, returned to the club on a short-term contract.

Three draws in a row in late March and early April kept Brentford top, before a first win for over a month was achieved in "The Battle of Bournemouth" on 13 April, during which Darren Powell was sent off for fighting with teammate Karleigh Osborne. Despite missing the chance to clinch promotion after a comprehensive defeat to play-off challengers Dagenham & Redbridge on 21 April, promotion and the League Two title were sealed with a 3–1 away win over Darlington in the penultimate match of the season. Captain Kevin O'Connor and stand-in skipper Alan Bennett held the League Two championship trophy aloft after a 2–0 win over Luton Town at Griffin Park on the final day.

== League table ==
Pos	Team	Pld	W	D	L	GF	GA	GD	Pts	Promotion, qualification or relegation
1	Brentford (C, P)	46	23	16	7	65	36	+29	85	Promotion to Football League One
2	Exeter City (P)	46	22	13	11	65	50	+15	79	Promotion to Football League One
3	Wycombe Wanderers (P)	46	20	18	8	54	33	+21	78	Promotion to Football League One
4	Bury	46	21	15	10	63	43	+20	78	Qualification for League Two play-offs
5	Gillingham (O, P)	46	21	12	13	58	55	+3	75	Qualification for League Two play-offs

Source: The Football League
Rules for classification: 1) points; 2) goal difference; 3) number of goals scored.
(C) Champions; (O) Play-off winners; (P) Promoted

== Results ==
Brentford's goal tally listed first.

=== Legend ===
Win	Draw	Loss

=== Pre-season ===
Date	Opponent	Venue	Result	Attendance	Scorer(s)
11 July 2008	Ipswich Town	H	0–2	n/a	
15 July 2008	Bromley	A	1–2	n/a	Connell
19 July 2008	AFC Wimbledon	A	2–1	1,361	Connell, Elder
22 July 2008	Staines Town	A	3–0	1,009	Antonio, Pead, Connell
26 July 2008	Watford	H	1–1	n/a	MacDonald
30 July 2008	Hampton & Richmond Borough	A	2–0	1,078	Connell, Ademola
2 August 2008	Woking	A	5–1	966	Connell (2), Poole, Williams, Phillips

=== Football League Two ===
No.	Date	Opponent	Venue	Result	Attendance	Scorer(s)
1	9 August 2008	Bury	A	0–1	2,819	
2	16 August 2008	Grimsby Town	H	4–0	4,009	MacDonald, Elder, Poole
3	23 August 2008	Barnet	A	1–0	2,815	Poole (pen)
4	30 August 2008	Rotherham United	H	0–0	4,381	
5	6 September 2008	Dagenham & Redbridge	H	2–1	4,519	Elder, MacDonald
6	13 September 2008	Wycombe Wanderers	A	0–0	5,799	
7	20 September 2008	Lincoln City	H	1–1	4,557	Elder
8	27 September 2008	Chesterfield	A	1–0	3,188	Bean
9	4 October 2008	Macclesfield Town	H	1–0	4,773	MacDonald
10	13 October 2008	Notts County	A	1–1	6,012	Poole
11	18 October 2008	Aldershot Town	A	1–1	5,023	Poole
12	21 October 2008	Morecambe	H	3–1	3,733	MacDonald, Poole, Elder
13	25 October 2008	Shrewsbury Town	H	1–1	5,362	MacDonald
14	28 October 2008	Chester City	A	0–3	1,301	
15	1 November 2008	Rochdale	H	1–2	4,291	Bowditch
16	15 November 2008	Port Vale	A	3–0	6,058	Osborne, Bean, MacDonald
17	22 November 2008	Darlington	H	1–1	4,837	Osborne
18	25 November 2008	Luton Town	A	1–0	5,248	Elder
19	13 December 2008	Bradford City	H	2–1	4,339	Osborne, Elder
20	20 December 2008	Gillingham	A	1–1	5,521	MacDonald
21	26 December 2008	Bournemouth	H	2–0	6,450	Bean (2)
22	28 December 2008	Exeter City	A	2–0	6,791	MacDonald (pen), Wood
23	10 January 2009	Lincoln City	A	2–2	3,932	Bean, Bowditch
24	17 January 2009	Notts County	H	1–1	5,465	Phillips
25	24 January 2009	Macclesfield Town	A	0–2	1,942	
26	27 January 2009	Aldershot Town	H	3–0	5,111	Bean, MacDonald (pen), Rhodes
27	31 January 2009	Shrewsbury Town	A	3–1	5,674	Rhodes (3)
28	3 February 2009	Morecambe	A	0–2	1,253	
29	7 February 2009	Chester City	H	3–0	4,719	MacDonald (3, 1 pen)
30	10 February 2009	Accrington Stanley	A	1–1	1,111	Rhodes
31	14 February 2009	Port Vale	H	2–0	4,702	Osborne, MacDonald
32	21 February 2009	Rochdale	A	2–1	3,412	Rhodes, MacDonald
33	28 February 2009	Bury	H	1–0	6,597	Bean
34	3 March 2009	Grimsby Town	A	1–0	3,001	MacDonald
35	7 March 2009	Rotherham United	A	0–0	3,406	
36	10 March 2009	Barnet	H	1–0	4,742	Bean
37	14 March 2009	Wycombe Wanderers	H	3–3	10,642	Rhodes, Hunt, Williams
38	17 March 2009	Chesterfield	H	0–1	4,541	
39	28 March 2009	Gillingham	H	1–1	7,908	Hunt
40	4 April 2009	Bradford City	A	1–1	12,832	Clarke
41	11 April 2009	Exeter City	H	1–1	8,234	Clarke
42	13 April 2009	Bournemouth	A	1–0	8,168	Clarke (Note: Media outlets misreported the goal as being scored by Darren Powell.)
43	18 April 2009	Accrington Stanley	H	3–0	7,135	Williams, Dickson, Clarke (pen)
44	21 April 2009	Dagenham & Redbridge	A	1–3	3,537	Spencer
45	25 April 2009	Darlington	A	3–1	3,868	Bennett, Clarke (2)
46	2 May 2009	Luton Town	H	2–0	10,223	Osborne, Newton

=== FA Cup ===
Round	Date	Opponent	Venue	Result	Attendance	Scorer(s)
R1	9 November 2008	Havant & Waterlooville	A	3–1	1,631	Williams, MacDonald, Elder
R2	28 November 2008	Barrow	A	1–2	3,532	MacDonald

=== Football League Cup ===
Round	Date	Opponent	Venue	Result	Attendance
R1	12 August 2008	Swansea City	A	0–2	5,366

=== Football League Trophy ===
Round	Date	Opponent	Venue	Result	Attendance	Scorer(s)
SR1	2 September 2008	Yeovil Town	H	2–2 (a.e.t.), won 4–2 on pens)	1,339	Poole (pen), O'Connor
SR2	7 October 2008	Luton Town	A	2–2 (a.e.t.), lost 4–3 on pens)	2,029	Poole, Williams

- Sources: Soccerbase, 11v11, brentfordfc.co.uk

== Playing squad ==
Players' ages are as of the opening day of the 2008–09 season.

No	Position	Name	Nationality	Date of birth (age)	Signed from	Signed in	Notes
Goalkeepers
1	GK	Ben Hamer	(England)	20 November 1987 (aged 20)	Reading	2008	On loan from Reading
21	GK	Simon Brown	(England)	12 March 1976 (aged 32)	Hibernian	2007	Loaned to Darlington
31	GK	Seb Brown	(England)	24 November 1989 (aged 18)	Youth	2006	
33	GK	Lloyd Anderson	(England)	17 October 1990 (aged 17)	Youth	2008	
Defenders
3	DF	Ryan Dickson	(England)	14 December 1986 (aged 21)	Plymouth Argyle	2007	
5	DF	Mark Phillips	(England)	27 January 1982 (aged 26)	Millwall	2008	
6	DF	Alan Bennett	(Republic of Ireland)	4 October 1981 (aged 26)	Reading	2008	On loan from Reading
14	DF	Brett Johnson	(England)	15 August 1985 (aged 22)	Northampton Town	2008	
22	DF	Karleigh Osborne	(England)	19 March 1988 (aged 20)	Youth	2004	Loaned to Oxford United and Eastbourne Borough
24	DF	Fraser Franks	(England)	22 November 1990 (aged 17)	Youth	2008	
26	DF	John Halls	(England)	14 February 1982 (aged 26)	Reading	2008	
27	DF	Darren Powell	(England)	10 March 1976 (aged 32)	Unattached	2009	
Midfielders
2	MF	Kevin O'Connor (c)	(Republic of Ireland)	24 February 1982 (aged 26)	Youth	2000	
4	MF	Marcus Bean	(Jamaica)	2 November 1984 (aged 23)	Blackpool	2008	
7	MF	Adam Newton	(Saint Kitts and Nevis)	12 April 1980 (aged 28)	Peterborough United	2008	
8	MF	Gary Smith	(England)	30 January 1984 (aged 24)	Milton Keynes Dons	2007	
11	MF	Glenn Poole	(England)	3 February 1981 (aged 27)	Grays Athletic	2007	
15	MF	David Hunt	(England)	10 September 1982 (aged 25)	Shrewsbury Town	2009	
16	MF	Sam Wood	(England)	9 August 1986 (aged 22)	Bromley	2008	
17	MF	Craig Pead	(England)	15 September 1981 (aged 26)	Walsall	2007	
25	MF	Lewis Ochoa	(England)	24 June 1991 (aged 17)	Youth	2008	
29	MF	Craig Dobson	(Jamaica)	23 January 1984 (aged 24)	Unattached	2009	
32	MF	Marvin Williams	(England)	12 August 1987 (aged 20)	Yeovil Town	2008	
Forwards
9	FW	Nathan Elder	(England)	5 April 1985 (aged 23)	Brighton & Hove Albion	2008	
10	FW	Charlie MacDonald	(England)	13 February 1981 (aged 27)	Southend United	2008	
18	FW	Sam Williams	(England)	9 June 1987 (aged 21)	Aston Villa	2009	On loan from Aston Villa
19	FW	Moses Ademola	(England)	18 July 1989 (aged 19)	Croydon Athletic	2008	Loaned to Welling United
20	FW	Damian Spencer	(England)	19 September 1981 (aged 26)	Cheltenham Town	2009	On loan from Cheltenham Town
23	FW	Ross Montague	(England)	1 November 1988 (aged 19)	Youth	2007	Loaned to Basingstoke Town
28	FW	Billy Clarke	(Republic of Ireland)	13 December 1987 (aged 20)	Ipswich Town	2009	On loan from Ipswich Town
Players who left the club mid-season
~~12~~	FW	Dean Bowditch	(England)	15 June 1986 (aged 22)	Ipswich Town	2008	Returned to Ipswich Town after loan
~~12~~	FW	Alan Connell	(England)	5 February 1983 (aged 25)	Hereford United	2007	Transferred to Bournemouth
12	FW	Jordan Rhodes	(Scotland)	5 February 1990 (aged 18)	Ipswich Town	2009	Returned to Ipswich Town after loan
~~12~~	MF	Josh Wright	(England)	6 November 1989 (aged 18)	Charlton Athletic	2008	Returned to Charlton Athletic after loan
~~15~~	MF	Damian Scannell	(England)	28 April 1985 (aged 23)	Southend United	2008	Returned to Southend United after loan
~~15~~	DF	James Wilson	(Wales)	26 February 1989 (aged 19)	Bristol City	2008	Returned to Bristol City after loan
~~18~~	DF	Darius Charles	(England)	10 December 1987 (aged 20)	Youth	2004	Loaned to Ebbsfleet United, transferred to Ebbsfleet United
~~20~~	MF	Frankie Artus	(England)	27 September 1988 (aged 19)	Bristol City	2008	Returned to Bristol City after loan
~~20~~	FW	Eric Odhiambo	(England)	12 May 1989 (aged 19)	Leicester City	2008	Returned to Leicester City after loan
34	GK	Mikkel Andersen	(Denmark)	17 December 1988 (aged 19)	Reading	2008	Returned to Reading after loan

- Source: Soccerbase

== Coaching staff ==
=== Name ===	Role
(England) Andy Scott	Manager
(England) Terry Bullivant	Assistant Manager
(England) Dave Appanah	Physiotherapist
(England) Dave Carter	Kit Man

== Statistics ==
=== Appearances and goals ===
Substitute appearances in brackets.

No	Pos	Nat	Name	League		FA Cup		League Cup		FL Trophy		Total	
No	Pos	Nat	Name	Apps	Goals	Apps	Goals	Apps	Goals	Apps	Goals	Apps	Goals
2	MF	(Republic of Ireland)	Kevin O'Connor	25 (3)	0	2	0	1	0	2	1	29 (3)	1
3	DF	(England)	Ryan Dickson	31 (8)	1	2	0	0	0	1 (1)	0	34 (9)	1
4	MF	(Jamaica)	Marcus Bean	43 (1)	9	2	0	1	0	1	0	47 (1)	9
5	DF	(England)	Mark Phillips	28 (5)	1	2	0	0	0	2	0	32 (5)	1
7	MF	(Saint Kitts and Nevis)	Adam Newton	30 (5)	1	0 (1)	0	1	0	2	0	33 (6)	1
8	MF	(England)	Gary Smith	2 (2)	0	0	0	0	0	0	0	2 (2)	0
9	FW	(England)	Nathan Elder	18 (9)	6	2	1	1	0	0	0	21 (9)	7
10	FW	(England)	Charlie MacDonald	38	16	2	2	0	0	1	0	41	18
11	MF	(England)	Glenn Poole	18 (8)	5	1	0	1	0	2	2	22 (8)	7
~~12~~	FW	(England)	Alan Connell	1 (1)	0	—		0	0	—		1 (1)	0
14	DF	(England)	Brett Johnson	7 (3)	0	0	0	1	0	1	0	9 (3)	0
15	MF	(England)	David Hunt	10 (10)	2	—		—		—		10 (10)	2
16	MF	(England)	Sam Wood	37 (3)	1	1 (1)	0	0	0	0 (1)	0	38 (5)	1
17	MF	(England)	Craig Pead	5 (1)	0	1	0	1	0	1	0	8 (1)	0
19	FW	(England)	Moses Ademola	0 (8)	0	0	0	0 (1)	0	1 (1)	0	1 (10)	0
21	GK	(England)	Simon Brown	0 (1)	0	—		—		—		0 (1)	0
22	DF	(England)	Karleigh Osborne	19 (4)	4	1 (1)	0	0	0	1	0	21 (5)	4
23	FW	(England)	Ross Montague	0	0	—		0	0	1 (1)	0	1 (1)	0
26	DF	(England)	John Halls	22 (1)	0	1	0	—		0	0	23 (1)	0
27	DF	(England)	Darren Powell	3 (1)	0	—		—		—		3 (1)	0
31	GK	(England)	Seb Brown	0	0	0	0	0	0	1	0	1	0
32	MF	(England)	Marvin Williams	21 (13)	0	1	1	1	0	1	1	24 (13)	2
33	GK	(England)	Lloyd Anderson	0	0	0 (1)	0	0	0	0	0	0 (1)	0
Players loaned in during the season
1	GK	(England)	Ben Hamer	45	0	2	0	1	0	1	0	49	0
6	DF	(Republic of Ireland)	Alan Bennett	44	1	2	0	1	0	0	0	47	1
~~12~~	FW	(England)	Dean Bowditch	8 (1)	2	0	0	—		—		8 (1)	2
12	FW	(Scotland)	Jordan Rhodes	14	7	—		—		—		14	7
~~12~~	MF	(England)	Josh Wright	5	0	—		—		1	0	6	0
~~15~~	MF	(England)	Damian Scannell	1 (1)	0	—		—		—		1 (1)	0
~~15~~	DF	(Wales)	James Wilson	14	0	—		1	0	1	0	16	0
18	FW	(England)	Sam Williams	5 (6)	2	—		—		—		5 (6)	2
~~20~~	MF	(England)	Frankie Artus	0 (1)	0	—		0	0	1	0	1 (1)	0
~~20~~	FW	(England)	Eric Odhiambo	0	0	0 (1)	0	—		—		0 (1)	0
20	FW	(England)	Damian Spencer	3 (2)	1	—		—		—		3 (2)	1
28	FW	(Republic of Ireland)	Billy Clarke	8	6	—		—		—		8	6
34	GK	(Denmark)	Mikkel Andersen	1	0	—		—		—		1	0

- Players listed in italics left the club mid-season.
- Source: Soccerbase

=== Goalscorers ===
No	Pos	Nat	Player	FL2	FAC	FLC	FLT	Total
10	FW	(England)	Charlie MacDonald	16	2	0	0	18
4	MF	(Jamaica)	Marcus Bean	9	0	0	0	9
12	FW	(Scotland)	Jordan Rhodes	7	—	—	—	7
9	FW	(England)	Nathan Elder	6	1	0	0	7
11	MF	(England)	Glenn Poole	5	0	0	2	7
28	FW	(Republic of Ireland)	Billy Clarke	6	—	—	—	6
22	DF	(England)	Karleigh Osborne	4	0	0	0	4
15	MF	(England)	David Hunt	2	—	—	—	2
18	FW	(England)	Sam Williams	2	—	—	—	2
~~12~~	FW	(England)	Dean Bowditch	2	0	—	—	2
32	MF	(England)	Marvin Williams	0	1	0	1	2
20	FW	(England)	Damian Spencer	1	—	—	—	1
6	DF	(Republic of Ireland)	Alan Bennett	1	0	0	0	1
3	DF	(England)	Ryan Dickson	1	0	0	0	1
7	MF	(Saint Kitts and Nevis)	Adam Newton	1	0	0	0	1
5	DF	(England)	Mark Phillips	1	0	0	0	1
16	MF	(England)	Sam Wood	1	0	0	0	1
2	MF	(Republic of Ireland)	Kevin O'Connor	0	0	0	1	1
Total				65	4	0	4	73

- Players listed in italics left the club mid-season.
- Source: Soccerbase

=== Discipline ===
No	Pos	Nat	Player	FL2		FAC		FLC		FLT		Total		Pts
No	Pos	Nat	Player	Booked	Sent off (straight red)	Booked	Sent off (straight red)	Booked	Sent off (straight red)	Booked	Sent off (straight red)	Booked	Sent off (straight red)	Pts
9	FW	(England)	Nathan Elder	5	2	0	0	0	0	0	0	5	2	11
4	MF	(Jamaica)	Marcus Bean	4	0	0	0	1	1	0	0	5	1	8
6	DF	(Republic of Ireland)	Alan Bennett	4	0	1	0	1	0	0	0	6	0	6
2	MF	(Republic of Ireland)	Kevin O'Connor	3	1	0	0	0	0	0	0	3	1	6
3	DF	(England)	Ryan Dickson	5	0	0	0	0	0	0	0	5	0	5
7	MF	(Saint Kitts and Nevis)	Adam Newton	4	0	1	0	0	0	0	0	5	0	5
1	GK	(England)	Ben Hamer	1	0	0	1	0	0	1	0	2	1	5
27	DF	(England)	Darren Powell	1	1	—		—		—		1	1	4
10	FW	(England)	Charlie MacDonald	3	0	0	0	0	0	0	0	3	0	3
22	DF	(England)	Karleigh Osborne	3	0	0	0	0	0	0	0	3	0	3
11	MF	(England)	Glenn Poole	2	0	0	0	0	0	1	0	3	0	3
32	MF	(England)	Marvin Williams	2	0	0	0	0	0	1	0	3	0	3
26	DF	(England)	John Halls	2	0	0	0	—		0	0	2	0	2
5	DF	(England)	Mark Phillips	2	0	0	0	0	0	0	0	2	0	2
16	MF	(England)	Sam Wood	2	0	0	0	0	0	0	0	2	0	2
20	FW	(England)	Damian Spencer	1	0	—		—		—		1	0	1
~~12~~	FW	(England)	Dean Bowditch	1	0	0	0	—		—		1	0	1
~~12~~	MF	(England)	Josh Wright	1	0	—		—		0	0	1	0	1
~~15~~	DF	(Wales)	James Wilson	1	0	—		0	0	0	0	1	0	1
14	DF	(England)	Brett Johnson	0	0	0	0	1	0	0	0	1	0	1
Total				47	4	2	1	3	1	3	0	55	6	73

- Players listed in italics left the club mid-season.
- Source: ESPN FC

=== Management ===
Name	Nat	From	To	Record All Comps					Record League				
Name	Nat	From	To	P	W	D	L	W %	P	W	D	L	W %
Andy Scott	(England)	9 August 2008	2 May 2009	51	24	18	9	47.06|	46	23	16	7	50.00

=== Summary ===
Games played	51 (46 League Two, 2 FA Cup, 1 League Cup, 2 Football League Trophy)
Games won	24 (23 League Two, 1 FA Cup, 0 League Cup, 0 Football League Trophy)
Games drawn	18 (16 League Two, 0 FA Cup, 0 League Cup, 2 Football League Trophy)
Games lost	9 (7 League Two, 1 FA Cup, 1 League Cup, 0 Football League Trophy)
Goals scored	73 (65 League Two, 4 FA Cup, 0 League Cup, 4 Football League Trophy)
Goals conceded	45 (36 League Two, 3 FA Cup, 2 League Cup, 4 Football League Trophy)
Clean sheets	19 (19 League Two, 0 FA Cup, 0 League Cup, 0 Football League Trophy)
Biggest league win	4–0 versus Grimsby Town, 16 August 2008
Worst league defeat	2–0 versus Chester City, 28 October 2008
Most appearances	48, Marcus Bean (44 League Two, 2 FA Cup, 1 League Cup, 1 Football League Trophy)
Top scorer (league)	16, Charlie MacDonald
Top scorer (all competitions)	18, Charlie MacDonald

== Transfers & loans ==
Players transferred in
Date	Pos.	Name	Previous club	Fee	Ref.
1 July 2008	FW	(England) Moses Ademola	(England) Croydon Athletic	£3,000	
1 July 2008	MF	(Jamaica) Marcus Bean	(England) Blackpool	Free	
1 July 2008	MF	(Saint Kitts and Nevis) Adam Newton	(England) Peterborough United	Free	
1 July 2008	MF	(England) Marvin Williams	(England) Yeovil Town	Undisclosed	
1 July 2008	MF	(England) Sam Wood	(England) Bromley	Free	
9 July 2008	FW	(England) Charlie MacDonald	(England) Southend United	Undisclosed	
5 August 2008	DF	(England) Brett Johnson	(England) Northampton Town	Free	
14 August 2008	DF	(England) Mark Phillips	(England) Millwall	Free	
25 September 2008	DF	(England) John Halls	(England) Reading	Free	
9 January 2009	MF	(England) David Hunt	(England) Shrewsbury Town	Free	
21 March 2009	DF	(England) Darren Powell	Unattached	Free	
24 March 2009	MF	(Jamaica) Craig Dobson	Unattached	Free	
Players loaned in
Date from	Pos.	Name	From	Date to	Ref.
1 July 2008	GK	(England) Ben Hamer	(England) Reading	End of season	
1 July 2008	DF	(England) Leigh Mills	(England) Tottenham Hotspur	7 August 2008	
8 August 2008	MF	(England) Frankie Artus	(England) Bristol City	7 September 2008	
8 August 2008	DF	(Republic of Ireland) Alan Bennett	(England) Reading	End of season	
8 August 2008	DF	(Wales) James Wilson	(England) Bristol City	7 November 2008	
19 September 2008	MF	(England) Josh Wright	(England) Charlton Athletic	20 October 2008	
31 October 2008	FW	(England) Dean Bowditch	(England) Ipswich Town	13 January 2009	
27 November 2008	FW	(England) Eric Odhiambo	(England) Leicester City	27 December 2008	
27 November 2008	MF	(England) Damian Scannell	(England) Southend United	27 December 2008	
9 December 2008	GK	(Denmark) Mikkel Andersen	(England) Reading	17 December 2008	
23 January 2009	FW	(Scotland) Jordan Rhodes	(England) Ipswich Town	18 March 2009	
9 March 2009	FW	(England) Sam Williams	(England) Aston Villa	End of season	
20 March 2009	FW	(England) Damian Spencer	(England) Cheltenham Town	End of season	
21 March 2009	FW	(Republic of Ireland) Billy Clarke	(England) Ipswich Town	End of season	
Players transferred out
Date	Pos.	Name	Subsequent club	Fee	Ref.
25 June 2008	DF	(England) Matthew Heywood	(England) Grimsby Town	Free	
29 August 2008	FW	(England) Alan Connell	(England) Bournemouth	Undisclosed	
29 January 2009	DF	(England) Darius Charles	(England) Ebbsfleet United	£15,000	
Players loaned out
Date from	Pos.	Name	To	Date to	Ref.
20 June 2008	DF	(England) Darius Charles	(England) Ebbsfleet United	28 January 2009	
2 August 2008	GK	(England) Simon Brown	(England) Darlington	5 January 2009	
1 September 2008	DF	(England) Karleigh Osborne	(England) Oxford United	30 September 2008	
10 October 2008	DF	(England) Karleigh Osborne	(England) Eastbourne Borough	8 November 2008	
17 October 2008	FW	(England) Ross Montague	(England) Basingstoke Town	17 January 2009	
4 December 2008	FW	(England) Moses Ademola	(England) Welling United	8 January 2009	
17 February 2009	FW	(England) Moses Ademola	(England) Welling United	18 March 2009	
2 April 2009	FW	(England) Geoff Banks-Smith	(England) Lewes	End of season	
Players released
Date	Pos.	Name	Subsequent club	Join date	Ref.
30 June 2009	GK	(England) Lloyd Anderson	(England) Maldon Town	2009	
30 June 2009	GK	(England) Seb Brown	(England) AFC Wimbledon	1 August 2009	
30 June 2009	MF	(Jamaica) Craig Dobson	(England) Mansfield Town	9 October 2009	
30 June 2009	DF	(England) John Halls	(England) Aldershot Town	28 July 2009	
30 June 2009	DF	(England) Brett Johnson	(England) AFC Wimbledon	4 August 2009	
30 June 2009	FW	(England) Ross Montague	(England) AFC Wimbledon	28 August 2009	
30 June 2009	MF	(Saint Kitts and Nevis) Adam Newton	(England) Luton Town	28 May 2009	
30 June 2009	MF	(England) Lewis Ochoa	(England) Maidenhead United	August 2009	
30 June 2009	MF	(England) Craig Pead	Retired		
30 June 2009	MF	(England) Glenn Poole	(England) Grays Athletic	28 August 2009	
30 June 2009	DF	(England) Darren Powell	(England) Milton Keynes Dons	7 August 2009	
30 June 2009	MF	(England) Gary Smith	(England) Darlington	1 July 2009	
30 June 2009	GK	(England) Simon Brown	(England) Northampton Town	11 September 2009	

== Kit ==
Supplier: Puma
Sponsor(s): Hertings

Home	Away

Source: Brentford F.C.

== Awards ==
- Supporters' Player of the Year: Sam Wood
- Community Player of the Year: Kevin O'Connor
- PFA Fans' League Two Player of the Year: Jordan Rhodes
- Football League Two Player of the Month: Marcus Bean (December 2008), Charlie MacDonald (February 2009)
- PFA Fans' League Two Player of the Month: Jordan Rhodes (March 2009)
- Puma League Two Golden Glove: Ben Hamer
- Football League Two Manager of the Month: Andy Scott (April 2009)
- Football League Two Community Club of the Year
- BBC London Manager of the Year 2008: Andy Scott
- League Managers Association Performance of the Week: Andy Scott (Darlington 1–3 Brentford, League Two, 25 April 2009)
