= Lewis Ochoa =

Lewis Ochoa may refer to:

- Lewis Ochoa (Colombian footballer) (born 1984), Colombian football right-back
- Lewis Ochoa (English footballer) (born 1991), English football midfielder
