= List of Hayes & Yeading United F.C. seasons =

Hayes & Yeading United Football Club, an association football club based in Hayes, Hillingdon, England, was founded in 2007 as a result of Hayes and Yeading merging as one team. In the 2006–07 Conference South the two teams finished in 19th and 16th respectively, so when they merged Hayes & Yeading United played in the same league the following season at level 6 in the English football league system. In their second season they were promoted to the Conference Premier after winning the 2009 Conference South play-offs. The club lasted three seasons in the Conference Premier before being relegated back into the Conference South. For the 2015–16 season the division was renamed National League South; in the same season Hayes & Yeading finished in 21st place and were relegated for the first time to level 7 in the English football league system to compete in the Southern Football League Premier Division.

Since their formation Hayes & Yeading United have also participated in two cup competitions each season, the FA Cup and the FA Trophy. Their furthest run in the FA Cup has seen the club reach the first round in four seasons: 2010–11, 2019–20, 2020–21 and 2021–22. Their furthest FA Trophy run has seen the club reach the second round the 2008–09 season where they were eliminated by AFC Telford United 4–0. As of the 2025–26 season, the club's first team has spent three seasons in the fifth tier of English football, six in the sixth tier, six in the seventh and four in the eighth. The table details their achievements in first-team competitions, and records their top goalscorer, for each season since their first appearance in the Conference South in 2007–08.

== Key ==
Key to divisions

Conference Premier – Conference Premier
Conference South – Conference South
National South – National League South
Southern Premier – Southern Football League Premier Division
Southern Premier South – Southern Football League Premier Division South
Southern Division 1 East – Southern Football League Division One East
Isthmian South Central – Isthmian League South Central Division

Key to rounds

- QR1 – First qualifying round, etc.
- R1 – First round, etc.
- SF – Semi-final
- W – Winners

Key to positions and symbols

- 1st – Champions
- 2nd – Runners-up
- ↑ – Promoted
- ↓ – Relegated
- † – Top league scorer in the division

== Seasons ==
List of seasons, including league division and statistics, cup results, top scorer and average league attendance
| Season | League record | | | | | | | | | FA Cup | FA Trophy | Other | | Top scorer(s) (Note: Includes goals scored in league competition (including play-offs), FA Cup, FA Trophy, Conference League Cup, Southern League Cup and Alan Turvey Trophy.) | | Average (Note: League matches only, excluding play-offs.) attendance |
| Season | Division | P | W | D | L | F | A | Pts | Pos | FA Cup | FA Trophy | Competition | Result | Name(s) | Goals | Average attendance |
|---|---|---|---|---|---|---|---|---|---|---|---|---|---|---|---|---|
| 2007–08 | Conference South | 42 | 14 | 12 | 16 | 67 | 73 | 54 | 13th | QR4 | R1 | Conference League Cup | R1 | Josh Scott | 15 | 265 |
| 2008–09 | Conference South ↑ | 42 | 24 | 9 | 9 | 74 | 43 | 81 | 4th (Note: Promoted into the Conference Premier via the play-offs, beating Eastleigh 6–4 on aggregate in the semi-final and Hampton & Richmond Borough 3–2 in the 2009 Conference South play-off Final.) | QR4 | R2 | Conference League Cup | R2 | Josh Scott | 25 | 343 |
| 2009–10 | Conference Premier | 44 | 12 | 12 | 20 | 59 | 85 | 48 | 17th | QR4 | R1 | — | — | Scott Fitzgerald | 11 | 587 (Note: Includes the attendance of the match against Chester City, the result of this match was expunged when Chester City were expelled from the league.) |
| 2010–11 | Conference Premier | 46 | 15 | 6 | 25 | 57 | 81 | 51 | 16th | R1 | R1 | — | — | Bradley Pritchard | 15 | 386 |
| 2011–12 | Conference Premier ↓ | 46 | 11 | 8 | 27 | 58 | 90 | 41 | 21st | QR4 | R1 | — | — | Louie Soares | 16 | 383 |
| 2012–13 | Conference South | 42 | 13 | 9 | 20 | 64 | 89 | 48 | 17th | QR4 | R1 | — | — | Kudus Oyenuga | 16 | 192 |
| 2013–14 | Conference South | 42 | 13 | 6 | 23 | 45 | 52 | 45 | 20th (Note: On 10 June 2014, Hereford United were expelled due to financial irregularities. Because of this, Hayes & Yeading were reprieved from relegation.) | QR2 | R1 | — | — | Jake Reid | 8 | 143 |
| 2014–15 | Conference South | 40 | 11 | 9 | 20 | 39 | 58 | 42 | 19th | QR2 | R1 | — | — | Pat Cox | 7 | 269 |
| 2015–16 | National South (Note: The Football Conference was renamed the National League; the North and South divisions were also renamed National League North and National League South.) ↓ | 42 | 11 | 13 | 18 | 51 | 76 | 46 | 21st | QR2 | QR3 | — | — | Elliot Benyon | 18 | |
| 2016–17 | Southern Premier ↓ | 46 | 10 | 11 | 25 | 48 | 81 | 41 | 23rd | QR2 | QR1 | Southern League Cup | W | Mitchell Weiss | 13 | |
| 2017–18 | Southern Division 1 East | 42 | 26 | 5 | 11 | 103 | 49 | 83 | 3rd (Note: Lost in the play-off semi-final to Cambridge City 1–0.) | QR3 | QR1 | Southern League Cup | SF | Manny Duku | 39 | |
| 2018–19 | Isthmian South Central (Note: At the end of the 2017–18 season Hayes & Yeading were transferred to the Isthmian League South Central Division.) ↑ | 38 | 29 | 6 | 3 | 129 | 36 | 93 | 1st | QR2 | R1 | Alan Turvey Trophy | R3 | Lee Barney | 33 | |
| 2019–20 | Southern Premier South | 32 | 17 | 6 | 9 | 65 | 42 | 57 | 3rd (Note: As a result of the COVID-19 pandemic, this season's Southern Football League was formally abandoned on 26 March 2020, with all results from the season being expunged, and no promotion or relegation taking place.) | R1 | QR3 | Southern League Cup | R2 | Ogo Obi | 12 | 211 |
| 2020–21 | Southern Premier South | 7 | 2 | 4 | 1 | 11 | 8 | 10 | 10th (Note: As a result of the COVID-19 pandemic, this season's Southern Football League was curtailed on 24 February 2021, with all results from the season being expunged.) | R1 | QR3 | — | — | Francis Amartey | 9 | 260 |
| 2021–22 | Southern Premier South | 42 | 26 | 8 | 8 | 100 | 39 | 86 | 2nd (Note: Beat Weston-super-Mare 2–1 in the semi-final before losing 2–1 to Farnborough in the 2022 Southern Football League Premier Division South play-off Final.) | R1 | R1 | Southern League Cup | R3 | Moses Emmanuel (Note: Scored 34 goals in the Southern Football League Premier Division South.) | 41 † | 253 |
| 2022–23 | Southern Premier South | 42 | 21 | 8 | 13 | 80 | 58 | 71 | 7th | QR2 | R1 | — | — | Moses Emmanuel | 35 | |
| 2023–24 | Southern Premier South ↓ | 42 | 11 | 13 | 18 | 59 | 67 | 46 | 20th | QR2 | QR3 | — | — | Sam Ashton; Ayo Faniyan | 8 | |
| 2024–25 | Isthmian South Central | 42 | 21 | 12 | 9 | 77 | 53 | 75 | 6th | QR1 | QR1 | Alan Turvey Trophy | R3 | Adrian Clifton | 23 | 216 |
| 2025–26 | Isthmian South Central | 42 | 18 | 7 | 17 | 62 | 78 | 61 | 9th | QR1 | QR3 | Alan Turvey Trophy | R4 | | | |
