= Adam Newton =

Footballer (born 1980)

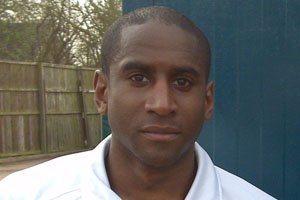
- Newton in 2010

Personal information
- Full name: Adam Lee Newton
- Date of birth: 4 December 1980 (age 45)
- Place of birth: Grays, England
- Height: 5 ft 10 in (1.78 m)
- Position: Full-back

Youth career
- 1997–1999: West Ham United

Senior career*
Years	Team	Apps	(Gls)
1999–2002	West Ham United	2	(0)
1999	→ Portsmouth (loan)	3	(0)
2000–2001	→ Notts County (loan)	20	(1)
2002	→ Leyton Orient (loan)	10	(1)
2002–2008	Peterborough United	218	(8)
2008–2009	Brentford	35	(1)
2009–2011	Luton Town	54	(2)
2011–2016	Woking	154	(4)
Total		496	(17)

International career
2000	England U21	1	(0)
2004–2015	Saint Kitts and Nevis	7	(1)
- * Club domestic league appearances and goals

Adam Lee Newton (born 4 December 1980) is a former professional footballer who played for West Ham United, Peterborough United, Brentford and Luton Town. Born in England, he represented the England U21 national team and the Saint Kitts and Nevis senior national team at international level.

== Club career ==
=== West Ham United ===
Newton was born in Grays. He began his career in the academy at West Ham United and signed a professional contract in August 1998, but he did not win a call into the first team squad during the 1998–99 season. He had a successful season with the youth team, winning the FA Youth Cup and scoring in both legs of the final. After making his professional debut while on loan to First Division club Portsmouth early in the 1999–00 season, Newton made his West Ham United debut on his return to Upton Park, as a substitute for Marc Keller in a 1–0 Premier League defeat to Coventry City on 25 September 1999. He made two further substitute appearances during the 1999–00 season and understudied right back Trevor Sinclair, but did not appear for the club again and had further spells away on loan during the 2000–01 and 2001–02 seasons. Out of favour with new manager Glenn Roeder, Newton was released by West Ham at the end of the 2001–02 season.

=== Peterborough United ===
After rejecting a contract with his previous loan club Leyton Orient, Newton joined Second Division club Peterborough United on a free transfer in May 2002. He quickly established himself in the team and made 249 appearances and scored 9 goals during six seasons at London Road and celebrated promotion to League One with the club at the end of the 2007–08 season. After dropping down the pecking order following the arrival of Russell Martin at the end of the 2007–08 season, Newton's contract was terminated by mutual agreement. He made 249 appearances and scored 9 goals during his time at the club.

=== Brentford ===
In June 2008, Newton joined League Two club Brentford on a one-year contract, effective 1 July 2008. At the start of the 2008–09 season, Brentford manager Andy Scott named Newton club captain, but he later lost the captaincy to Kevin O'Connor after a spell out injured. Newton was released by Brentford at the end of the season, having helped the Bees win the League Two title. He made 39 appearances and scored one goal during the season, which came in a 2–0 victory over Luton Town on the final day.

=== Luton Town ===
On 28 May 2009, Newton signed a two-year contract with newly relegated Conference Premier club Luton Town. Newton made 67 appearances and scored four goals over the over two seasons with the club and was a team which reached the 2011 Conference Premier play-off Final. On 2 June 2011, it was announced that Newton's contract would not be renewed and that he had been released by the club.

=== Woking ===
On 27 June 2011, Newton signed for Conference South club Woking. Despite briefly retiring during the 2015 off-season, he stayed with the club for five seasons and was a part of the team which finished the 2011–12 season as Conference South champions. Newton retired at the end of the 2015–16 season, after making 169 appearances and scoring four goals for the club. In his retirement, Newton occasionally played for Hackney & Leyton Sunday League club Downs.

== International career ==
Newton was capped once by England at under-21 level, in a 6–1 friendly victory over Georgia in August 2000. In 2004, he was one of three UK-based players to be called up by Saint Kitts and Nevis for the 2006 FIFA World Cup qualifying campaign. He won seven caps and scored one goal for Saint Kitts and Nevis between 2004 and 2015.

== Personal life ==
After retiring from football, Newton became a London taxi driver.

== Career statistics ==
Appearances and goals by club, season and competition
Club	Season	League			FA Cup		League Cup		Europe		Other		Total	
Club	Season	Division	Apps	Goals	Apps	Goals	Apps	Goals	Apps	Goals	Apps	Goals	Apps	Goals
West Ham United	1999–2000	Premier League	2	0	0	0	―		1 (Note: Appearance in UEFA Cup)	0	―		3	0
West Ham United	2000–01	Premier League	0	0	―		0	0	―		―		0	0
West Ham United	Total		2	0	0	0	0	0	1	0	―		3	0
Portsmouth (loan)	1999–2000	First Division	3	0	―		2	0	―		―		5	0
Notts County (loan)	2000–01	Second Division	20	1	2	0	0	0	—		0	0	22	1
Leyton Orient (loan)	2001–02	Third Division	10	1	0	0	0	0	—		―		10	1
Peterborough United	2002–03	Second Division	36	2	1	0	1	0	—		1 (Note: Appearance(s) in Football League Trophy)	0	39	2
Peterborough United	2003–04	Second Division	37	2	3	1	1	0	—		3	0	44	3
Peterborough United	2004–05	League One	30	0	3	0	0	0	—		0	0	33	0
Peterborough United	2005–06	League Two	40	3	2	0	1	0	—		3	0	46	0
Peterborough United	2006–07	League Two	43	1	4	0	2	0	—		1	0	50	1
Peterborough United	2007–08	League Two	32	0	2	0	2	0	—		1	0	37	0
Peterborough United	Total		218	8	15	1	7	0	―		9	0	249	9
Brentford	2008–09	League Two	35	1	1	0	1	0	—		2	0	39	1
Luton Town	2009–10	Conference Premier	37	2	5	2	—		—		0	0	42	4
Luton Town	2010–11	Conference Premier	19	0	0	0	—		—		2 (Note: Appearance(s) in Football Conference play-offs)	0	21	0
Luton Town	Total		56	2	5	2	―		―		2	0	63	2
Woking	2011–12	Conference South	38	0	1	0	—		—		1 (Note: Appearance(s) in FA Trophy)	0	40	0
Woking	2012–13	Conference Premier	43	0	1	0	—		—		2	0	46	0
Woking	2013–14	Conference Premier	37	1	1	0	—		—		2	0	40	1
Woking	2014–15	Conference Premier	35	3	2	0	—		—		5	0	42	3
Woking	2015–16	National League	1	0	0	0	—		—		0	0	1	0
Woking	Total		154	4	5	0	―		―		10	0	169	4
Career total			498	17	28	3	10	0	1	0	24	0	560	18

== Honours ==
West Ham United

- FA Youth Cup: 1998–99

Peterborough United

- Football League Two second-place promotion: 2007–08

Brentford

- Football League Two: 2008–09

Woking

- Conference South: 2011–12
