= Marvin Elliott =

Jamaican football midfielder (born 1984)

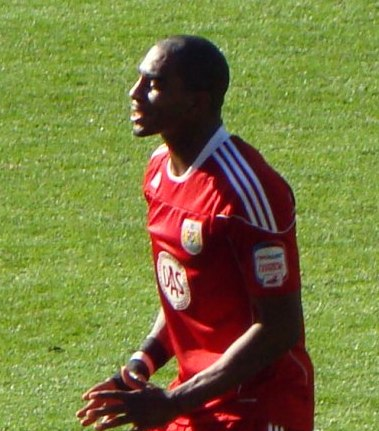

Personal information
- Full name: Marvin Conrad Elliott
- Date of birth: 15 September 1984 (age 42)
- Place of birth: Wandsworth, England
- Height: 6 ft 1 in (1.85 m)
- Position: Midfielder

Youth career
- ?–2002: Millwall

Senior career*
Years	Team	Apps	(Gls)
2002–2007	Millwall	144	(3)
2007–2014	Bristol City	242	(25)
2014–2015	Crawley Town	27	(6)
2017	Whitehawk	2	(1)
2017–2018	Kingstonian	0	(0)
Total		415	(35)

International career^{‡}
2011–2013	Jamaica	9	(1)
- * Club domestic league appearances and goals as of 09:53, 12 November 2017 (UTC) ‡ National team caps and goals as of 22 March 2013

Marvin Conrad Elliott (born 15 September 1984) is a Jamaican football midfielder.

== Club career ==
=== Millwall ===
After coming up through the Millwall academy, Elliott made his first appearance on 16 April 2003 against Nottingham Forest. If needed, he can be an emergency right back, and he was used in this role against Manchester United in the 2004 FA Cup Final when usual right back, Kevin Muscat was unavailable due to injury.

=== Bristol City ===
He signed for Bristol City on 30 July 2007. After a successful first season with Bristol City, Elliott established himself as a popular member of the squad and impressed his fellow professionals as well, being named in the P.F.A Team of the Year alongside teammate Bradley Orr. He also won Bristol City's 'Young Player of The Year' award in his first year at the club.

In The summer of 2009, the 24-year-old was a target for several Premier League clubs, including Fulham, Wolves, Blackburn, Portsmouth and West Brom – who had a bid rejected in January. He subsequently signed a new 3-year deal which would keep him at Bristol City until the end of the 2011–12 Football League Championship. On 21 February 2012, Elliott snapped his Achilles during a training session ruling him out for the rest of the season. Manager Derek McInnes said in an interview We're absolutely devastated for the lad. "It's a massive blow and Marvin was desperate to play his part in keeping us in the Championship. "It happened in training, right near the end of the session today. He was running for the ball with no one near him, there was no contact with anyone. He just pulled up in a lot of pain and you knew it was serious.

"He's had it checked out and the only positive is that he won't require surgery. He'll be back in four months for pre-season and we'll be doing all we can to be a Championship club for when he returns."

After an injury hit 2013–14 season, Elliot was released by Bristol City at the end of the season.

=== Crawley Town ===
Elliott joined Crawley Town on a monthly contract on 18 September 2014.

=== Whitehawk ===
After a spell out of the game while working as a stockbroker, Elliott signed for National League South club Whitehawk in October 2017.

=== Kingstonian ===
On 11 November 2017, Elliott signed for Isthmian League side Kingstonian.

== International ==
Elliot made his international debut for Jamaica against Honduras on 11 October 2011. On 23 March 2013, Marvin Elliott made his third appearance and scored his first international goal for Jamaica in their 2014 World Cup qualifier against Panama. The game finished 1–1.

=== International goals ===
Scores and results list Nation's goal tally first.

No	Date	Venue	Opponent	Score	Result	Competition
1.	23 March 2013	Independence Park, Kingston, Jamaica	Panama	1–0	1–1	2014 FIFA World Cup qualification

== Career statistics ==
=== Club ===
As of match played 8 February 2014.

Club statistics
Club	Season	League			FA Cup		League Cup		Europe		Other		Total	
Club	Season	Division	Apps	Goals	Apps	Goals	Apps	Goals	Apps	Goals	Apps	Goals	Apps	Goals
Millwall	2002–03	First Division	1	0	0	0	0	0	—		—		1	0
Millwall	2003–04	First Division	21	0	4	0	0	0	—		—		25	0
Millwall	2004–05	Championship	41	1	1	0	1	0	2 (Note: Appearances in UEFA Cup)	0	—		45	1
Millwall	2005–06	Championship	39	2	2	0	3	1	—		—		44	3
Millwall	2006–07	League One	42	0	3	0	2	0	—		2 (Note: Appearances in Football League Trophy)	0	49	0
Millwall	Total		144	3	10	0	6	1	2	0	2	0	164	4
Bristol City	2007–08	Championship	45	5	1	0	2	1	—		3 (Note: Appearances in Play-off matches)	0	51	6
Bristol City	2008–09	Championship	28	3	2	0	0	0	—		—		30	3
Bristol City	2009–10	Championship	39	1	2	0	2	0	—		—		43	1
Bristol City	2010–11	Championship	46	8	1	0	1	0	—		—		48	8
Bristol City	2011–12	Championship	28	2	0	0	0	0	—		—		28	2
Bristol City	2012–13	Championship	32	2	0	0	1	1	—		—		33	3
Bristol City	2013–14	League One	24	4	4	1	2	0	—		0	0	30	5
Bristol City	Total		242	25	10	1	8	2	—		3	0	263	28
Career total			386	28	20	1	14	3	2	0	5	0	427	32

=== International ===
As of match played 10 September 2013.

International statistics
National team	Year	Apps	Goals
Jamaica	2011	1	0
Jamaica	2013	8	1
Total		9	1

== Honours ==
Millwall

- FA Cup runner-up: 2003–04

Individual

- PFA Team of the Year: 2007–08 Football League Championship
