= Lewis Ochoa (English footballer) =

English footballer

Personal information
- Full name: Lewis Mervyn Ochoa
- Date of birth: 24 June 1991 (age 35)
- Place of birth: Ealing, England
- Height: 5 ft 10 in (1.78 m)
- Position: Midfielder

Youth career
- 2002–2008: Brentford

Senior career*
Years	Team	Apps	(Gls)
2008–2009	Brentford	0	(0)
2009–2010	Maidenhead United	16	(0)
2009	→ Hendon (dual-registration)	1	(0)
2010	Bedfont Town		
2011	Burnham	1	(1)
2011–2012	A.F.C. Hayes		(2)
2012–2015	Hanwell Town		
2015–2016	Chalfont St Peter	32	(2)
2016–2017	Harrow Borough	31	(0)
2017	Hanwell Town	2	(0)
2017–2018	Northwood	14	(1)
- * Club domestic league appearances and goals

Lewis Merryn Ochoa (born 24 June 1991) is an English semi-professional footballer who plays as a midfielder. He began his career in the Football League with Brentford, for whom he made one professional appearance, before dropping into non-League football upon his release in 2009.

== Career ==
=== Brentford ===
Ochoa began his career in the youth system at Brentford in 2002 and by 2008 had progressed into the youth team. He received his maiden call into the first team squad for a League Cup first round match versus Swansea City on 12 August 2008 and remained an unused substitute during the 2–0 de asfeat. Ochoa made his professional debut in a Football League Trophy first round shootout win over Yeovil Town on 2 September 2008, when he came on as a substitute in the 83rd minute for Frankie Artus. He was called into the squad three further times during the 2008–09 season, but would not appear for the club again. Ochoa was released in June 2009.

=== Non-League football ===
Ochoa dropped into non-League football when he signed for Conference South club Maidenhead United in August 2009. Despite making just 19 appearances during the 2009–10 season and being forced to find additional game time away with Hendon on a dual-registration deal, he was a part of the Magpies' Berks & Bucks Senior Cup-winning team. Ochoa moved into the Southern League for the 2010–11 and 2011–12 seasons and played for Bedfont Town, Burnham and A.F.C. Hayes.

In 2012, Ochoa dropped down to the Spartan South Midlands League Premier Division to join Hanwell Town and made a minor contribution to the club's promotion to the Southern League at the end of the 2013–14 season. Ochoa had a full season of Southern League First Division Central football with Chalfont St Peter in 2015–16 and moved across to the Isthmian League Premier Division to join Harrow Borough in June 2016. He was a part of the Boro team which reached the first round proper of the 2015–16 FA Cup. After a brief spell back with Hanwell Town, Ochoa joined Southern League First Division Central club Northwood in October 2017. By February 2018, he had departed the club.

== Personal life ==
As of February 2018, Ochoa was living in Australia.

== Career statistics ==
As of match played 26 December 2017

Appearances and goals by club, season and competition
Club	Season	League			FA Cup		League Cup		Other		Total	
Club	Season	Division	Apps	Goals	Apps	Goals	Apps	Goals	Apps	Goals	Apps	Goals
Brentford	2008–09	League Two	0	0	0	0	0	0	1 (Note: Appearances in Football League Trophy)	0	1	0
Maidenhead United	2009–10	Conference South	16	0	—		—		3 (Note: Appearances in Berks & Bucks Senior Cup)	1	19	1
Hendon (dual-registration)	2009–10	Isthmian League Premier Division	1	0	3	1	—		2 (Note: 1 appearance in FA Trophy, 1 appearance and 1 goal in Isthmian League Cup)	1	6	2
Burnham	2010–11	Southern League First Division Central	1	1	0	0	—		0	0	1	1
Hanwell Town	2012–13	Spartan South Midlands League Premier Division	20	2	1	0	—		6 (Note: 3 appearances in FA Vase, 1 appearance and 1 goal in Spartan South Midlands League Challenge Trophy, 1 appearance in Spartan South Midlands League Premier Division Cup, 1 appearance in London Senior Cup)	1	27	3
Hanwell Town	2013–14	Spartan South Midlands League Premier Division	5	1	0	0	—		2 (Note: 1 appearance in Spartan South Midlands League Challenge Trophy, 1 appearance in Spartan South Midlands League Premier Division Cup)	0	7	1
Hanwell Town	Total		25	3	1	0	—		8	1	34	4
Chalfont St Peter	2015–16	Southern League First Division Central	32	2	1	1	—		3 (Note: 1 appearance in FA Trophy, 1 appearance in Southern League Cup, 1 appearance in Wycombe Senior Cup)	0	36	3
Harrow Borough	2016–17	Isthmian League Premier Division	31	0	6	0	—		7 (Note: 3 appearances in FA Trophy, 2 appearances in Isthmian League Cup, 1 appearance in Middlesex County Cup, 1 appearance in Middlesex Senior Charity Cup)	0	44	0
Hanwell Town	2017–18	Southern League First Division East	2	0	3	0	—		—		5	0
Hanwell Town	Total		27	3	4	0	—		8	1	39	4
Northwood	2017–18	Southern League First Division Central	14	1	0	0	—		2 (Note: 1 appearance in FA Trophy, 1 appearance in Middlesex Senior Cup)	0	16	1
Career total			122	7	14	2	0	0	26	3	162	12

== Honours ==
Maidenhead United

- Berks & Bucks Senior Cup: 2009–10
