= Nathan Elder =

English footballer (born 1985)

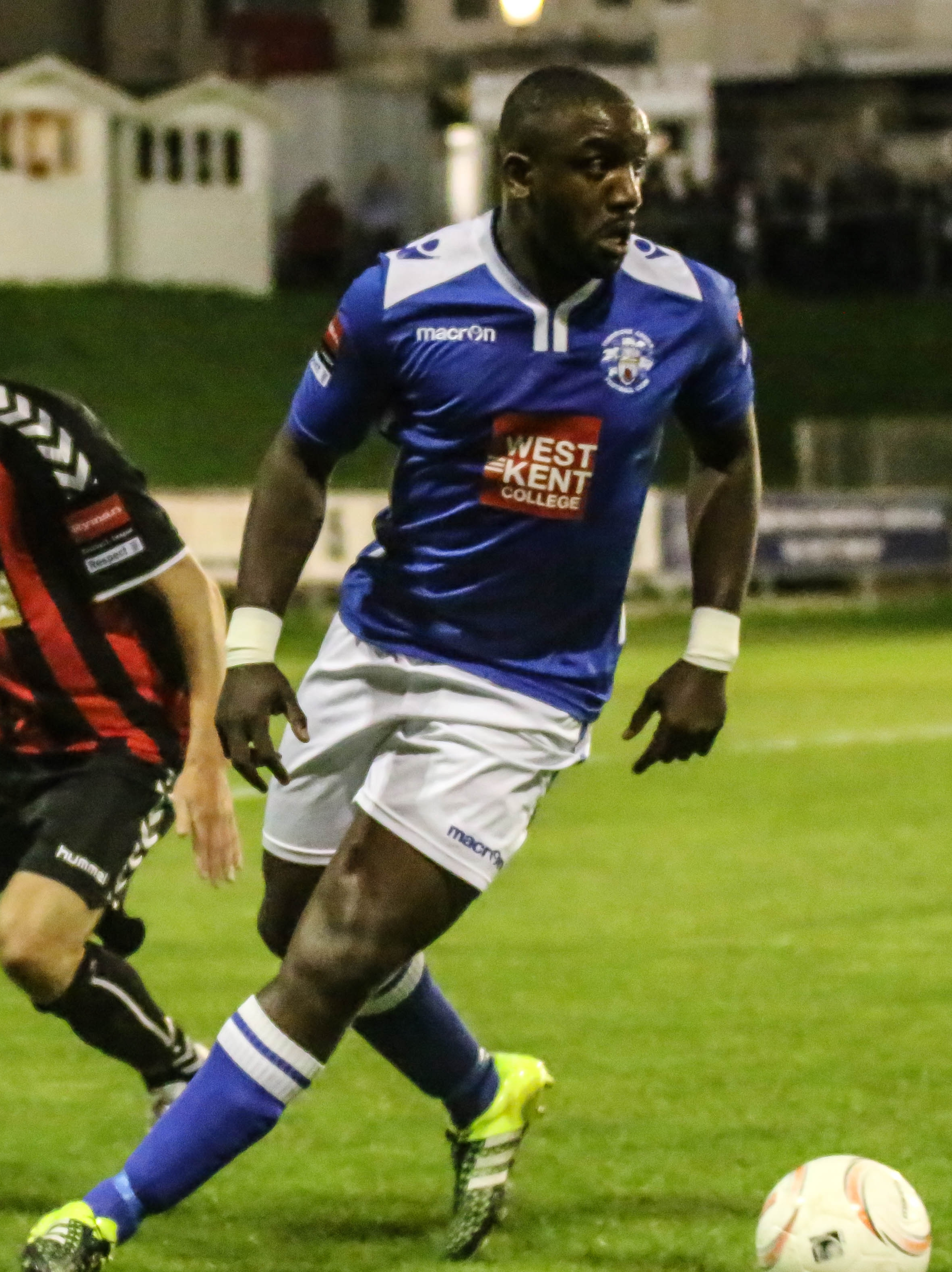
- Elder playing for Tonbridge Angels in 2015

Personal information
- Full name: Nathan John Elder
- Date of birth: 5 April 1985 (age 41)
- Place of birth: Hornchurch, England
- Height: 6 ft 1 in (1.85 m)
- Position: Forward

Team information
- Current team: Hythe Town (assistant)

Youth career
- Barns Sports

Senior career*
Years	Team	Apps	(Gls)
- Hornchurch
- Barking & East Ham United
2003–2004	Aveley		
2004–2007	Billericay Town	26	(36)
2007–2008	Brighton & Hove Albion	22	(2)
2008–2009	Brentford	44	(10)
2009–2011	Shrewsbury Town	19	(2)
2010	→ AFC Wimbledon (loan)	18	(3)
2011–2012	Hayes & Yeading United	6	(0)
2011–2012	→ Hereford United (loan)	14	(2)
2012	Hereford United	12	(1)
2012–2013	Ebbsfleet United	42	(15)
2013–2015	Dover Athletic	50	(9)
2014–2015	→ Hayes & Yeading United (loan)	5	(1)
2015	→ Maidstone United (loan)		
2015	→ Tonbridge Angels (loan)	8	(3)
2015–2019	Tonbridge Angels	154	(62)
2018–2019	Sittingbourne	8	(0)

Managerial career
- 2019: Sittingbourne (player-assistant)
- 2019–: Hythe Town (assistant)
- * Club domestic league appearances and goals

Nathan John Elder (born 5 April 1985) is an English former professional footballer who is assistant manager of Hythe Town. He played in the Football League for Brighton & Hove Albion, Brentford, Shrewsbury Town and Hereford United.

== Career ==
=== Early years ===
Elder was born in Hornchurch. He first played football while attending Langtons Infant School in his hometown Hornchurch, starting out as a defender. His first club was Sunday league side Barns Sports, before moving up to Isthmian League Division Three side Hornchurch. Moves up through the echelons of the Isthmian League to Barking & East Ham United, Aveley and Billericay Town followed. While he appeared sparingly for Billericay Town between 2004 and 2007, he scored prolifically, scoring 36 goals in 26 league appearances for the club.

=== Brighton & Hove Albion ===
Elder joined Brighton & Hove Albion on 1 January 2007, after the "Seagulls" paid his former club Billericay Town £10,000 after being impressed with his talent during a match for Isthmian League Billericay against non-League rivals Worthing.

At Brighton, Elder found first-team opportunities under Dean Wilkins very difficult. During his time there he only started three games, two in League One and one in the Football League Trophy, scoring just twice for the club in total.

=== Brentford ===
On 31 January 2008, Elder joined Brentford for £35,000. He scored an own goal on his debut for Brentford against Mansfield Town after just 15 minutes (though the goal was later credited to Mansfield player Michael Boulding), but scored the winner as Brentford eventually won 3–2. Elder won a 2008–09 League Two championship medal with the Bees, but his season was ended early after suffering a double fracture of the cheekbone, a fractured eye socket, severe trauma to the eyeball and extensive bleeding in and around the eye in a "horror clash" with Rotherham United's Pablo Mills in a match on 7 March 2009. In the days following the incident, Elder had no sight in his left eye and Brentford manager Andy Scott called for justice to be done. On 12 March, it was reported that the FA would be unable to take disciplinary action against Mills. Elder recovered sufficiently to be included in the squad for the final match of the season against Luton Town, but he remained an unused substitute and would not play again for the club. He revealed in April 2009 that the vision in his left eye would never be 100% again.

=== Shrewsbury Town ===
On 3 August 2009 he signed for Shrewsbury Town on a three-year deal for an undisclosed fee. However Elder was then transfer listed on 9 November 2009, with manager Paul Simpson unhappy with a performance in the 1–0 FA Cup loss at home to non-League club Staines Town.

=== Return to non-League football ===
On 15 January 2010, Elder joined Conference Premier club AFC Wimbledon on loan until the end of the 2009–10 season. The day after he signed, Elder scored his debut goal in AFC Wimbledon's 2–0 home win against Mansfield Town and picked up the man of the match award. He made a total of 18 appearances for the Dons and scored three goals. Shortly before he was due to return to Shrewsbury, Elder picked up an injury in a game at Tamworth. It was later discovered that he had suffered a tear of his anterior cruciate ligament and would be out for at least six months. It was announced on 24 June 2011 that he was to be released.

After being released by Shrewsbury, Elder was signed by Conference Premier side Hayes & Yeading United.

On 30 September, Elder signed on a monthlong loan deal with League Two side Hereford United before permanently signing on 6 January 2012. His first goal for the club was a glancing header in the 66th minute against Barnet, this would effectively be the winner as Hereford won the match 1–0.

On 6 July 2012, he was signed by Ebbsfleet United.

On 17 June 2013, Elder was signed by Dover Athletic on a free transfer. On 10 May 2014, Elder scored the only goal of the game in Dover's 1–0 playoff final win over former club Ebbsfleet United to seal Dover's return to the Conference Premier for the first time since 2002.

Having spent much of the previous season out on loan, including finishing the season with Tonbridge Angels, Elder joined the club permanently following his release from Dover in May 2015.

Elder joined Isthmian League South East Division club Sittingbourne as player-coach in August 2018 and was promoted into the role of assistant manager in February 2019.

In September 2019, Elder left to Sittingbourne to link up with his former Maidstone team-mate Steve Watt, as his assistant manager at Hythe Town.

== Personal life ==
Elder attended Langtons Infant School and Emerson Park Comprehensive. He stated that Andy Cole was the player he modelled himself on. Prior to becoming a professional footballer, he worked as an instructor in a gym. After leaving professional football, he worked in recruitment at Leadenhall Market.

== Career statistics ==
Appearances and goals by club, season and competition
Club	Season	League			FA Cup		League Cup		Other		Total	
Club	Season	Division	Apps	Goals	Apps	Goals	Apps	Goals	Apps	Goals	Apps	Goals
Billericay Town	2005–06	Isthmian League Premier Division	34	8	0	0	—		5 (Note: Appearances in Isthmian League Cup)	2	39	10
Billericay Town	2006–07	Isthmian League Premier Division	18	6	0	0	—		1	0	19	6
Billericay Town	Total		52	14	0	0	—		6	2	58	16
Brighton & Hove Albion	2006–07	League One	13	1	—		—		—		13	1
Brighton & Hove Albion	2007–08	League One	9	1	2	0	0	0	3 (Note: Appearances in Football League Trophy)	0	14	1
Brighton & Hove Albion	Total		22	2	2	0	0	0	3	0	27	2
Brentford	2007–08	League Two	17	4	—		—		—		17	4
Brentford	2008–09	League Two	27	6	2	1	1	0	0	0	30	7
Brentford	Total		44	10	2	1	1	0	0	0	47	11
Shrewsbury Town	2009–10	League Two	19	2	1	0	1	0	1	0	22	2
AFC Wimbledon (loan)	2009–10	Conference Premier	18	3	—		—		—		18	3
Hayes & Yeading United	2011–12	Conference Premier	6	0	—		—		—		6	0
Hereford United	2011–12	League Two	26	3	1	0	—		—		27	3
Ebbsfleet United	2012–13	Conference Premier	42	15	2	1	—		0	0	44	16
Dover Athletic	2013–14	Conference South	37	7	3	2	—		7 (Note: Three appearances, one goal in Conference South play-offs; four appearances, one goal in FA Trophy)	2	47	11
Dover Athletic	2014–15	Conference Premier	10	1	0	0	—		0	0	10	1
Dover Athletic	Total		47	8	3	2	—		7	2	57	12
Hayes & Yeading United	2014–15	Conference South	5	1	—		—		—		5	1
Hayes & Yeading United	Total		11	1	—		—		—		11	1
Tonbridge Angels (loan)	2014–15	Isthmian League Premier Division	7	2	—		—		—		7	2
Tonbridge Angels	2015–16	Isthmian League Premier Division	40	23	1	0	—		5 (Note: Two appearances, two goals in Isthmian League Cup; two appearances, one goal in FA Trophy; one appearance in Isthmian League Premier Division play-offs)	3	46	26
Tonbridge Angels	2016–17	Isthmian League Premier Division	40	15	4	2	—		7 (Note: Four appearances, one goal in Isthmian League Cup; three appearances in FA Trophy)	1	51	18
Tonbridge Angels	2017–18	Isthmian League Premier Division	39	11	1	0	—		4 (Note: Two appearances, one goal in Isthmian League Cup; two appearances in FA Trophy)	1	44	12
Tonbridge Angels	Total		126	51	6	2	—		16	5	148	58
Sittingbourne	2018–19	Isthmian League South East Division	8	0	0	0	—		2 (Note: Appearances in FA Trophy)	1	10	1
Career total			415	109	17	6	2	0	35	10	469	125

== Honours ==
Brentford

- Football League Two: 2008–09

Dover Athletic

- Conference South play-offs: 2014
