= David Livermore =

Footballer; football manager (born 1980)

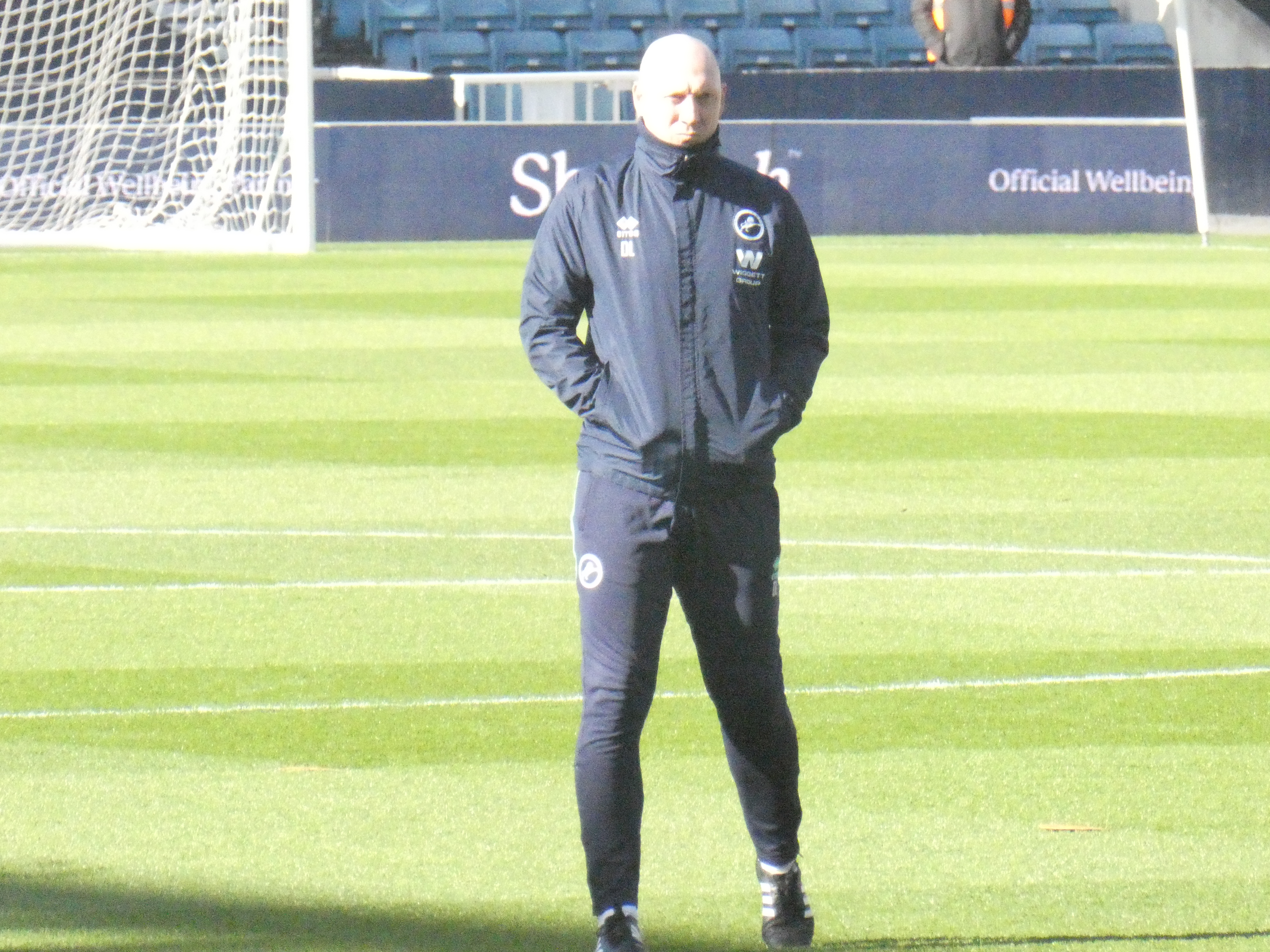
- Livermore in 2026.

Personal information
- Full name: David Livermore
- Date of birth: 20 May 1980 (age 46)
- Place of birth: Edmonton, England
- Height: 5 ft 11 in (1.80 m)
- Positions: Midfielder; defender

Youth career
- 1988–1998: Arsenal

Senior career*
Years	Team	Apps	(Gls)
1998–1999	Arsenal	0	(0)
1999–2006	Millwall	273	(12)
2006	Leeds United	0	(0)
2006–2008	Hull City	45	(5)
2008	→ Oldham Athletic (loan)	10	(1)
2008–2010	Brighton & Hove Albion	16	(0)
2009	→ Luton Town (loan)	8	(0)
2010	Barnet	14	(1)
2010–2012	Histon	44	(0)
Total		410	(19)

Managerial career
- 2010–2012: Histon
- 2024: Millwall (caretaker)
- * Club domestic league appearances and goals

David Livermore (born 20 May 1980) is an English retired footballer who was most recently caretaker manager of Millwall. Livermore has featured for clubs such as Arsenal, Millwall, Hull City, Brighton & Hove Albion, Luton Town and Oldham Athletic. He also served as a player/manager at Histon.

== Playing career ==
Born in Edmonton, London, Livermore was a trainee at Arsenal. At Arsenal FC Livermore suffered an injury which led to promotion of Ashley Cole into Livermore's year group as an understudy. Ashley Cole determined that Livermore's injury was one of the crucial events of his own career. Livermore went on to feature for Millwall, where he became club captain. With Millwall, he won the 2001 Division Two title. While at the club he also played in the 2004 FA Cup final, but he conceded a penalty as they lost to Manchester United. He also netted the 1000th goal of the Coca-Cola £1 million goal chase against Nottingham Forest. In 2006, Livermore won Millwall's Player of the Year award.

Livermore joined Hull City for £500,000, having been spent only ten days as a Leeds United player after signing from Millwall in the summer of 2006 also for £500,000. This came after Leeds manager Kevin Blackwell stated the club had eventually managed to acquire other players in the same position in Ian Westlake and Kevin Nicholls, and felt Livermore's first team chances were limited. Livermore missed Hull's first two matches in the 2006–07 season through injury, but went on to play in twenty-five league games, scoring four goals and aiding Hull in escaping relegation. He joined Oldham Athletic on loan on 31 January 2008. With the Latics he played 10 games and scored once altogether.

On 5 June 2008, Hull announced that Livermore would be leaving the club that summer, following their promotion to the Premier League.

On 3 July 2008, it was announced that Livermore had agreed a two-year contract at League One club Brighton & Hove Albion. On 26 March 2009, Livermore was allowed to leave Brighton to join League Two side Luton Town on loan, where he made eight appearances. On 2 February 2010, it was revealed that Livermore was due to leave Brighton, although his current contract wouldn't expire until the end of the season.

On 4 February 2010 he signed with Barnet, scoring once in 14 appearances, against Darlington. After a change of manager two games before the end of the 2009–10 season, he was released by Barnet.

== Career statistics ==
Appearances and goals by club, season and competition
Club	Season	League			FA Cup		League Cup		Other		Total	
Club	Season	Division	Apps	Goals	Apps	Goals	Apps	Goals	Apps	Goals	Apps	Goals
Arsenal	1998–99	Premier League	0	0	0	0	0	0	0	0	0	0
Total			0	0	0	0	0	0	0	0	0	0
Millwall	1999–2000	Division Two	34	2	0	0	2	0	1 (Note: Appearance(s) in Football League Trophy)	0	37	2
Millwall	2000–2001	Division Two	39	3	3	0	4	1	0	0	46	4
Millwall	2001–2002	Division One	41	0	2	0	2	0	2 (Note: Appearance(s) in Division One play-offs)	0	46	4
Millwall	2002–2003	Division One	41	2	4	0	1	0	0	0	46	2
Millwall	2003–2004	Division One	36	1	7	0	0	0	0	0	43	1
Millwall	2004–2005	Championship	41	2	0	0	1	0	2 (Note: Appearance(s) in UEFA Cup)	0	44	2
Millwall	2005–2006	Championship	41	2	2	0	4	1	0	0	47	3
Total			273	12	18	0	14	2	5	0	310	14
Leeds United	2006–2007	Championship	0	0	0	0	0	0	0	0	0	0
Hull City	2006–2007	Championship	25	4	2	0	1	0	0	0	28	4
Hull City	2007–2008	Championship	20	1	1	0	3	0	0	0	24	1
→ Oldham Athletic (loan)	2007–2008	League One	10	1	0	0	0	0	0	0	10	1
Brighton & Hove Albion	2008–2009	League One	16	0	1	0	3	0	4	0	24	0
→ Luton Town (loan)	2008–2009	League Two	8	0	0	0	0	0	0	0	8	0
Brighton & Hove Albion	2009–2010	League One	0	0	0	0	0	0	1	0	1	0
Barnet	2009–2010	League Two	14	1	0	0	0	0	0	0	14	1
Histon	2010–2011	Conference Premier	14	0	0	0	0	0	0	0	14	0
Histon	2011–2012	Conference North	30	0	0	0	0	0	0	0	30	0
Career total			410	19	22	0	21	2	10	0	463	21

== Managerial career ==
Livermore was appointed manager of Conference National team Histon on 23 August 2010. Livermore featured 14 times during the 2010–11 season, after which Histon were relegated to the Conference North; he was a more regular fixture for the club in the 2011–12 season with 30 starts and one substitute appearance, as they finished the season in 16th place. In 2012, Livermore was recruited as a youth team coach at Millwall and in 2015, was appointed as the assistant manager of the club.

On 3 October 2019, Livermore resigned as assistant manager of Millwall.

On 31 January 2022, Livermore again followed Neil Harris as his assistant manager to League One strugglers Gillingham.

In February 2024, Livermore returned to Millwall as assistant head coach following the reappointment of Neil Harris. In December 2024, following the resignation of Harris, Livermore was appointed caretaker manager.

== Style of play ==
His preferred position was central midfield, but he could also play in defence, either in the centre or at left-back.

== Honours ==
Millwall

- Football League Second Division: 2000–01
- FA Cup runner-up: 2003–04

Individual

- Millwall Player of the Season: 2005–06
