= Will Hendry =

English footballer

Personal information
- Full name: William Michael Hendry
- Date of birth: 10 November 1986 (age 39)
- Place of birth: Maidenhead, England
- Height: 5 ft 11 in (1.80 m)
- Position: Central midfielder

Team information
- Current team: Maidenhead United

Youth career
- 2003–2004: Millwall

Senior career*
Years	Team	Apps	(Gls)
2004–2006	Millwall	3	(0)
2006	Hayes	4	(0)
2006–2007	Grays Athletic	0	(0)
2007	Hayes	18	(0)
2007–2009	Hayes & Yeading United	34	(6)
2009	Dagenham & Redbridge	0	(0)
2009	Maidenhead United	7	(5)
2009–2010	AFC Wimbledon	20	(1)
2010	Eastleigh	8	(0)
2010–2011	Maidenhead United	25	(1)
2011–	Hayes & Yeading United	0	(0)
- * Club domestic league appearances and goals as of 00:05, 2 January 2012 (UTC)

William Michael Hendry (born 10 November 1986 in Maidenhead, Berkshire, England) is an English footballer playing as a midfielder for Hayes & Yeading United. He played in The Football League for Millwall.

== Club career ==
Hendry returned to Hayes & Yeading United in December 2011, having previously been a part of the side that earned promotion to the Conference National in May 2009.
