= Moses Emmanuel =

English footballer

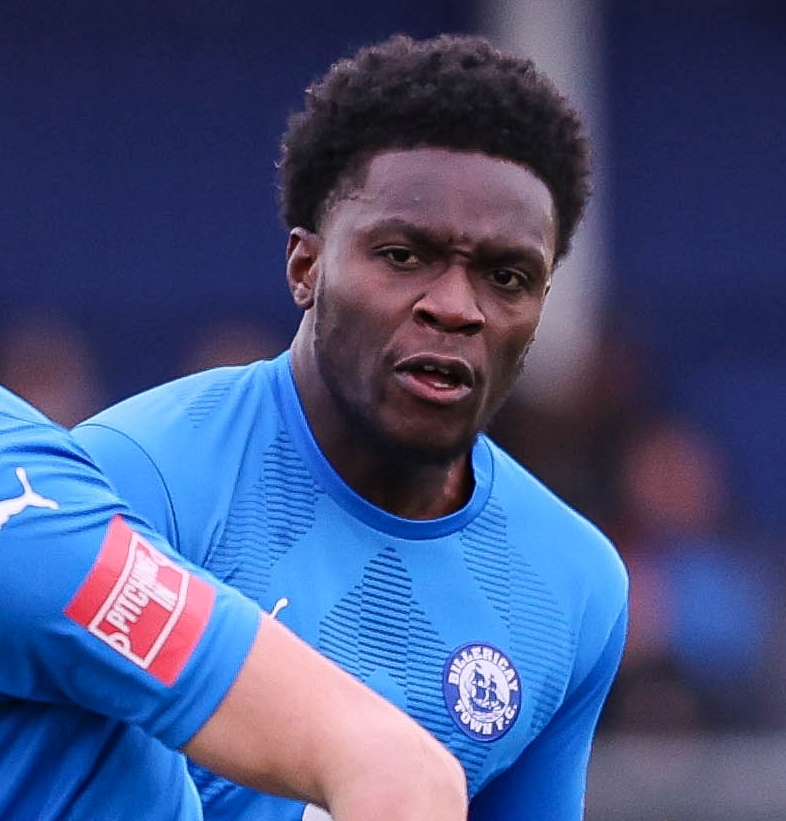
- Emmanuel playing for Billericay Town in 2024.

Personal information
- Full name: Moses Emmanuel
- Date of birth: 9 August 1989 (age 37)
- Place of birth: Lewisham, England
- Height: 5 ft 8 in (1.73 m)
- Position: Forward

Team information
- Current team: AFC Whyteleafe

Youth career
- –2004: Cray Wanderers

Senior career*
Years	Team	Apps	(Gls)
2007–2008	Croydon Athletic	36	(19)
2008–2010	Brentford	8	(0)
2008–2009	→ Welling United (loan)	4	(1)
2009–2010	→ Woking (loan)	15	(4)
2010–2012	Woking	95	(25)
2012	Eastleigh	15	(7)
2012–2014	Dover Athletic	48	(3)
2013	→ Canvey Island (loan)	10	(2)
2014–2016	Bromley	82	(35)
2016–2017	Dover Athletic	35	(11)
2017–2018	Sutton United	10	(2)
2017–2018	→ Maidenhead United (loan)	21	(3)
2018–2019	Billericay Town	49	(22)
2019–2020	Welling United	6	(2)
2020–2021	Wealdstone	23	(9)
2021–2023	Hayes & Yeading United	80	(69)
2023–2025	Billericay Town	69	(18)
2025	Kingstonian	5	(5)
2025–	AFC Whyteleafe	34	(21)
- * Club domestic league appearances and goals as of 14:37, 4 July 2026 (UTC)

Moses Emmanuel (born 9 August 1989) is an English semi-professional footballer who plays as a striker for AFC Whyteleafe. He was previously known as Moses Ademola.

== Early career ==
Emmanuel joined Cray Wanderers at a young age and eventually left in 2004. After scoring 19 goals for Croydon Athletic in the Isthmian League Division One South in the 2007–08 season, Emmanuel was spotted by scouts from teams in the Football League.

== Club career ==
=== Brentford ===
Emmanuel consequently, went on trial with Charlton Athletic and Brentford. He signed his first professional deal with the latter in May 2008. His transfer fee was reportedly £2,500, paid by the Brentford fanzine "Thorne in the Side".

=== Welling United ===
The striker was loaned to Conference South side Welling United in November 2008, but was recalled by Brentford without making an appearance. He returned to Park View Road in December 2008, and made four appearances in the league, scoring once. The loan spell was extended for a further month in early January 2009, but just three days later, the decision was reversed, and Ademola returned to Griffin Park.

=== Woking ===
Emmanuel joined Woking on loan the following season. On 29 January 2010, he made his loan move permanent by signing a contract with Woking, then staying on for the 2010–11 season. In July 2011, it was confirmed that Ademola would be spending another season at the club.

=== Eastleigh and Bromley ===
On 12 July 2012, Emmanuel joined another Conference South club, Eastleigh. He left Eastleigh on 27 November for divisional rivals Dover Athletic, while being the club's joint top scorer for the 2012–13 season having scored 7 goals in 15 league appearances. He left the club in May 2014 after turning down a new contract and subsequently joining Bromley. After scoring three times in pre-season, Ademola scored Bromley's opening goal of the league season, in a 3–1 away win against Havant & Waterlooville. He was a key figure in Bromley's title winning season in 2014–15, and continued his fine form in the National League, including a hattrick in a 7–3 victory over Torquay United. He left Bromley after his contract expired in the summer of 2016.

=== Dover Athletic ===
After a two-week trial at Gillingham, Emmanuel eventually re-signed for Dover Athletic on 5 August 2016.

=== Sutton United ===
In May 2017, Emmanuel signed a deal with Sutton United. He made his club debut on 8 August 2017 in a 1–0 away defeat to Eastleigh before scoring his first goal for the U's on 15 August in a 2–1 home victory over Macclesfield Town. He joined Maidenhead United on loan in October 2017.

=== Billericay Town ===
Emmanuel joined Billericay Town for the 2018–19 season. In his first season at the club, he scored 25 goals, 17 in the league and eight in cup competitions, and finished the season as the club's top scorer. In total, he scored 30 goals in 63 games for Billericay.

=== Welling United ===
Emmanuel joined Welling United on 22 November 2019.

=== Wealdstone ===
After seven appearances for Welling, Emmanuel joined Wealdstone on 10 January 2020. He went on to score 4 times in 9 games as Wealdstone won the National League South title. On 6 October 2020, Emmanuel scored Wealdstone's first goal in the National League for 32 years, converting a penalty in the opening game of the season against Yeovil Town. He would go on to miss much of the second half of the 2020–21 season due to being furloughed, and subsequently left Wealdstone at the end of the season, having scored a total of 11 goals for the club.

=== Hayes & Yeading United ===
Emmanuel joined Hayes & Yeading United for 2021–22. He scored a total of 69 goals in 80 league games for the club across two seasons.

=== Return to Billericay Town ===
On 8 June 2023, Emmanuel rejoined former club Billericay Town.

=== Kingstonian ===
In May 2025, Emmanuel joined Isthmian League South Central Division side Kingstonian.

=== AFC Whyteleafe ===
In September 2025, Emmanuel joined Isthmian League South East Division club AFC Whyteleafe for an undisclosed fee.

== Personal life ==
Emmanuel studied sports business at college and prior to entering full-time football with Brentford, he contemplated attending university. Whilst at Croydon, Emmanuel was a finalist in the Sky TV reality show, Football Icon 2 in which young players competed for a contract at Chelsea. Emmanuel later worked as a PE coach in schools.

== Career statistics ==
As of match played 28 April 2026

Appearances and goals by club, season and competition
Club	Season	League			FA Cup		League Cup		Other		Total	
Club	Season	Division	Apps	Goals	Apps	Goals	Apps	Goals	Apps	Goals	Apps	Goals
Croydon Athletic	2007–08	IL – Division 1 South	36	19	0	0	—		0	0	36	19
Brentford	2008–09	League Two	8	0	0	0	1	0	2 (Note: Appearances in the FA Trophy)	0	11	0
Welling United (loan)	2008–09	Conference South	4	1	0	0	—		0	0	4	1
Woking	2009–10	Conference South	36	5	2	0	—		7 (Note: Three appearances in the FA Trophy, one in the Surrey Senior Cup and three in the Conference South play-offs)	0	45	5
Woking	2010–11	Conference South	43	9	6	0	—		6 (Note: Four appearances and two goals in the FA Trophy; two appearances in the Conference South play-offs)	2	55	11
Woking	2011–12	Conference South	41	14	2	0	—		6 (Note: One appearance in the FA Trophy and three in the Surrey Senior Cup)	0	49	14
Woking	Total		120	28	10	0	0	0	19	2	149	30
Eastleigh	2012–13	Conference South	15	7	2	0	—		1	0	18	7
Dover Athletic	2012–13	Conference South	23	1	0	0	—		3 (Note: Appearances in the Conference South play-offs)	1	26	2
Dover Athletic	2013–14	Conference South	25	2	0	0	—		6 (Note: Three appearances and a goal in the Kent Senior Cup; three appearances and two goals in the Conference South play-offs)	3	31	5
Dover Athletic	Total		48	3	0	0	0	0	9	4	57	7
Canvey Island (loan)	2013–14	IL – Premier Division	10	2	0	0	—		2	2	12	4
Bromley	2014–15	Conference South	40	15	5	1	—		5 (Note: One appearance in the Kent Senior Cup; four appearances and a goal in the FA Trophy)	1	50	17
Bromley	2015–16	National League	42	20	1	0	—		1	0	44	20
Bromley	Total		82	35	6	1	0	0	6	1	94	37
Dover Athletic	2016–17	National League	35	11	1	0	—		4 (Note: Two appearances in the FA Trophy; two appearances and a goal in the Kent Senior Cup)	1	40	12
Sutton United	2017–18	National League	10	2	1	0	—		0	0	11	2
Maidenhead United (loan)	2017–18	National League	21	3	—		—		3 (Note: Two appearances and three goals in the FA Trophy; one appearance in the Berks and Bucks Challenge Cup)	3	24	6
Billericay Town	2018–19	National League South	35	17	6	8	—		3 (Note: Two appearances in the FA Trophy; one appearance in the Essex Senior Cup)	0	44	25
Billericay Town	2019–20	National League South	14	5	5	0	—		0	0	19	5
Billericay Town	Total		49	22	11	8	0	0	3	0	63	30
Welling United	2019–20	National League South	6	2	0	0	—		1	0	7	2
Wealdstone	2019–20	National League South	9	4	0	0	—		0	0	9	4
Wealdstone	2020–21	National League	14	5	1	0	–		2	2	17	7
Wealdstone	Total		23	9	1	0	0	0	2	2	26	11
Hayes & Yeading United	2021–22	SFL Premier Division South	37	35	6	3	—		5 (Note: Two appearances and one goal in the FA Trophy; one appearance in the Southern Football League Cup; two appearances and two goals in Southern League Premier Division South play-offs)	3	48	41
Hayes & Yeading United	2022–23	SFL Premier Division South	43	34	3	1	—		4 (Note: Appearance(s) in Middlesex Senior Cup)	2	50	37
Hayes & Yeading United	Total		80	69	9	4	0	0	9	5	98	78
Billericay Town	2023–24	Isthmian League Premier Division	31	11	5	3	—		6 (Note: Four appearances and three goals in FA Trophy, two appearances in Alan Turvey Trophy)	3	42	17
Billericay Town	2024–25	Isthmian League Premier Division	38	7	1	0	—		4 (Note: One appearance in FA Trophy, two appearances and one goal in Alan Turvey Trophy, one appearance in Isthmian League play-offs)	1	43	8
Billericay Town	Total		69	18	6	3	0	0	10	4	85	25
Kingstonian	2025–26	Isthmian League South Central Division	5	5	1	0	—		0	0	6	5
AFC Whyteleafe	2025–26	Isthmian League South Central Division	34	21	0	0	—		5 (Note: Twp appearances and one goal in Alan Turvey Trophy, one appearance and one goal in Surrey Senior Cup, one appearance in FA Trophy, one appearance in Isthmian League playoffs)	2	39	23
Career total			655	257	48	16	1	0	76	26	780	297
