= Dean Pooley =

English footballer

Personal information
- Date of birth: 10 September 1986 (age 40)
- Place of birth: Sidcup, England
- Position: Defender

Senior career*
Years	Team	Apps	(Gls)
2005–2006	Millwall	1	(0)
2006	→ Beckenham Town (loan)		
2007	Bohemians	19	(1)
2008	Ballymena United	2	(0)
2008–2011	Ebbsfleet United	68	(1)
2011–2013	Margate	70	(4)
2013–2014	Bromley	36	(1)
2014–2015	Ebbsfleet United	12	(0)
- * Club domestic league appearances and goals as of 19:53, 12 April 2014 (UTC)

Dean Pooley (born 10 September 1986) is an English footballer who plays for Ebbsfleet United.

== Career ==
Pooley was previously at Millwall, making one senior appearance for the club in a Championship game against Burnley in April 2006.

Sean Connor signed him for Bohemians where he did enough in pre-season games to be offered a contract. He made his league debut starting in centre midfield against Drogheda United in March 2007. He scored his first goal for Bohs in a League Cup game against Cork City on 3 July 2007. However, when his contract ended at the end of the 2007 season, Pooley was released by Bohs.

On 30 January 2007, manager Tommy Wright swooped to sign Pooley on a short-term deal until the end of the 2007–08 season. After a couple of appearances Pooley was released after the club and player mutually agreed to terminate the contract.

In August 2008, Pooley joined Conference National outfit, Ebbsfleet United on a one-year contract. This was extended by a further year following a fund raising appeal by Ebbsfleet manager Liam Daish to the owners of the club.

Dean was released by Ebbsfleet in May 2011.

On 13 June 2011, manager Chris Kinnear signed Pooley for Margate. He became Kinnear's first signing in his second spell in charge at the club.

On 13 August 2013, he signed for Conference South side Bromley. Pooley scored his first goal for the club in a 3–2 away win over Concord Rangers on 17 September 2013.

On 15 September 2014, he re-signed with Ebbsfleet United.

On 5 June 2015, Pooley departed the squad at Ebbsfleet United, but he will stay as an assistant to the general manager.
