= Charlie MacDonald =

English footballer (born 1981)

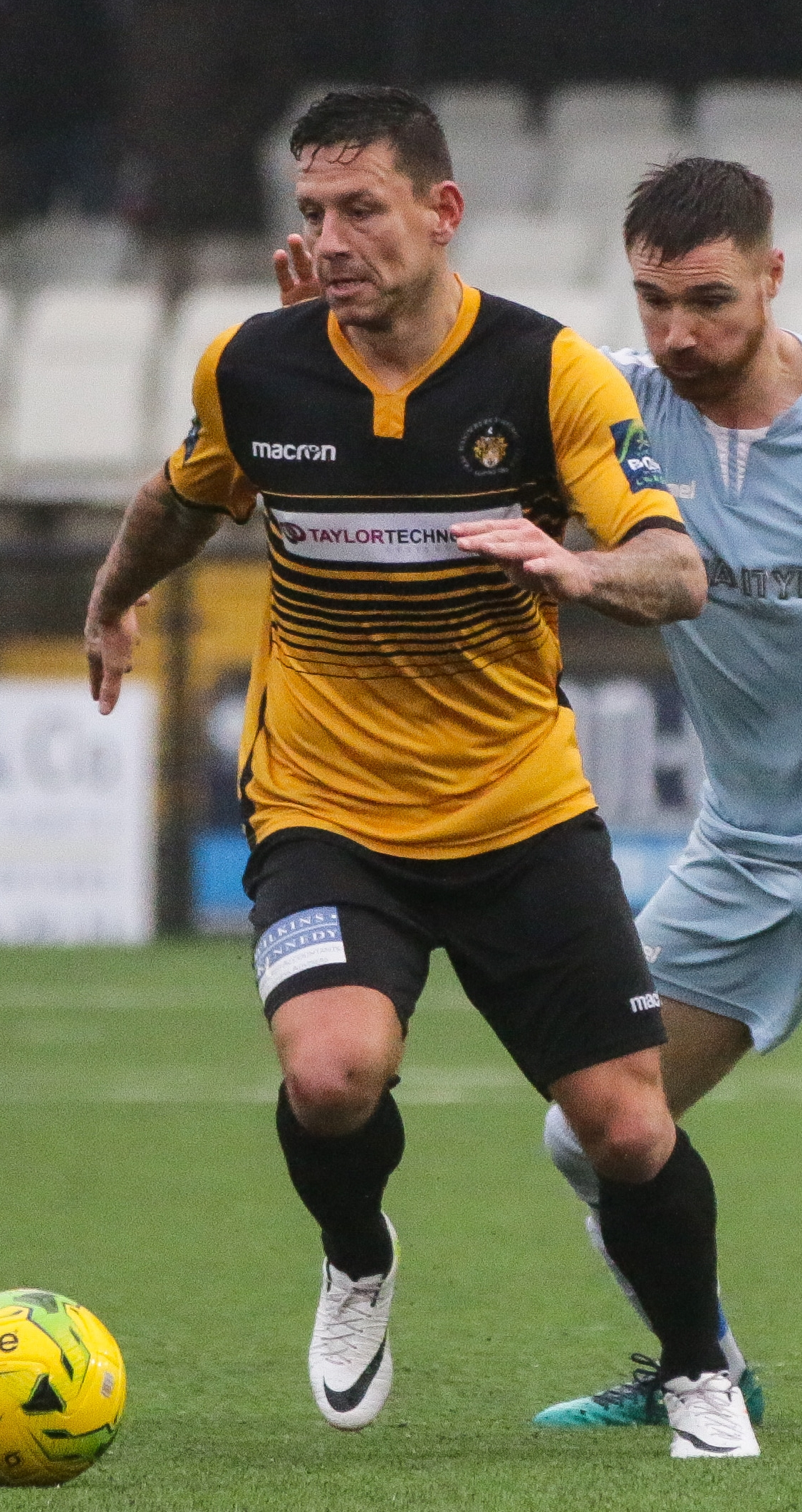
- MacDonald playing for Cray Wanderers in 2018.

Personal information
- Full name: Charles Lea MacDonald
- Date of birth: 13 February 1981 (age 45)
- Place of birth: Southwark, London, England
- Height: 1.75 m (5 ft 9 in)
- Position: Forward

Youth career
- 1997: Millwall
- 1998: Charlton Athletic

Senior career*
Years	Team	Apps	(Gls)
1998–2002	Charlton Athletic	8	(1)
2001	→ Cheltenham Town (loan)	8	(2)
2002	→ Torquay United (loan)	5	(0)
2002	→ Colchester United (loan)	4	(1)
2002	Margate	5	(1)
2002–2003	Stevenage Borough	16	(3)
2003–2005	Crawley Town	30	(10)
2005–2007	Gravesend & Northfleet	61	(39)
2007–2008	Southend United	26	(1)
2008–2011	Brentford	111	(40)
2011–2013	Milton Keynes Dons	52	(11)
2013	Leyton Orient	20	(3)
2013–2014	Oldham Athletic	30	(5)
2014–2015	Barnet	30	(8)
2015–2016	Boreham Wood	18	(1)
2016–2016	→ St Albans City (loan)	17	(8)
2016–2018	Greenwich Borough	57	(32)
2018	Cray Wanderers	17	(12)
2018–2020	VCD Athletic	58	(44)
2020–2021	Glebe	8	(5)
2021	Barking	9	(4)
Total		590	(231)
- * Club domestic league appearances and goals

Charles Lea MacDonald (born 13 February 1981) is an English footballer who last played for Barking.

== Football career ==
=== Early career ===
MacDonald played for the Millwall youth team before joining Charlton Athletic as a trainee, turning professional in August 1998. He made his Charlton debut on 3 January 2000, as a late substitute for Martin Pringle in a 3–0 win at home to Nottingham Forest. He started the FA Cup tie against Queens Park Rangers the following weekend, scoring the only goal as Charlton progressed to the fourth round. He made two further appearances as substitute that season and won the Charlton Young Player of the Year Award.

He joined Cheltenham Town on loan in March 2001, scoring twice in seven games with both goals coming in the same game against Blackpool. He returned to the Charlton first team squad later that year and scored his first ever Premiership goal when scoring the late equaliser in the 1–1 draw with Newcastle United at The Valley. However, that was his last involvement with the Charlton first team and in February 2002 he joined Torquay United on loan, playing five games without scoring. In March 2002 he joined Colchester United on loan, but made just four appearances and scored one goal, in a 2–2 draw with Wigan Athletic, before returning to his parent club at The Valley.

He was released by Charlton in May 2002 and joined Conference side Margate in August. After one goal against Forest Green Rovers and five appearances, the following month he moved to Conference rivals Stevenage Borough.

=== Crawley Town ===
In August 2003 he moved to Crawley Town, and after an injury-troubled start, went on to play a crucial role in the club winning the Dr Martens League Premier Division and with it, promotion to the Nationwide Conference for the first time in its history. His best spell saw him score nine goals in seven matches – scoring in all seven. He was the side's leading scorer in the league, with 17 goals.

He had the honour of scoring Crawley's first ever goal in the Conference, part of a brace that saw them beat Leigh RMI away from home 2–1. He scored seven goals in the first two months, but eventually lost his place and was loaned out to Weymouth in April 2005.

=== Gravesend & Northfleet ===
In May 2005 he moved to Gravesend & Northfleet and soon settled in as a regular in the Gravesend team and a regular on the scoresheet. His contract with Gravesend and Northfleet ended at the close of the 2006–07 season and put pen-to-paper on a two-year deal with Southend United, arriving at Roots Hall on a free transfer.

=== Southend United ===
During his time at Southend he scored just once in the league against Doncaster Rovers, but he scored a further four goals in cup competitions with a goal against Watford in the League Cup, a brace against Oxford United in the FA Cup and another goal in the FA Cup against Dagenham & Redbridge.

=== Brentford ===
He joined Brentford on 9 July 2008 for an undisclosed fee on a two-year contract. He scored 18 goals in his first season at the club, helping Brentford to win League Two. He was awarded the League Two Player of the Month award for February 2009. His first season was ended in March due to a shoulder injury; however, he bounced back to become Brentford's top scorer in the 2009–10 season. In his three-year stay at Brentford he scored a league goal every 2.7 games; 40 goals in 111 games at Griffin Park.

=== Milton Keynes Dons ===
On 26 August 2011, Charlie MacDonald signed a two-year contract with Milton Keynes Dons for a £35,000 fee. MacDonald was the replacement for Sam Baldock, who recently left MK Dons to join West Ham United.

=== Leyton Orient ===
MacDonald signed for Leyton Orient on a free transfer on 12 January 2013.

=== Oldham Athletic ===
MacDonald joined Oldham Athletic on a one-year contract in July 2013, with the option of a second year, after Leyton Orient chose not to extend his contract.

MacDonald's debut was against Stevenage FC in an epic match that ended 4–3 to Oldham Athletic, with MacDonald earning 2 penalties including the match-winner converted by Jose Baxter. MacDonald's first goal for Latics was a consolation header in a 2–1 defeat to Peterborough United at London Road.

At the end of the 2013–14 season, the one – year option that the club had on MacDonald's contract was not exercised, and thus he was released. During his time at the club he had made 30 league appearances, scoring five goals.

=== Barnet ===
MacDonald joined Barnet on 16 July 2014. He scored a penalty on his debut, a 5–0 away win at Chester. He was appointed captain of the side by manager Martin Allen. After scoring eight goals during Barnet's promotion winning campaign, MacDonald was not offered a new contract with the Bees.

=== Boreham Wood ===
MacDonald joined Boreham Wood on 15 July 2015. He scored only twice in all competitions in the first half of the season and was loaned to St Albans City in January 2016. Director of football Ian Allinson stated that "it hasn't quite clicked for Charlie in his time with us. He is a great guy who just wants to play football and now he's fit, he was not getting the game time with us that he had hoped for".

=== Greenwich Borough ===
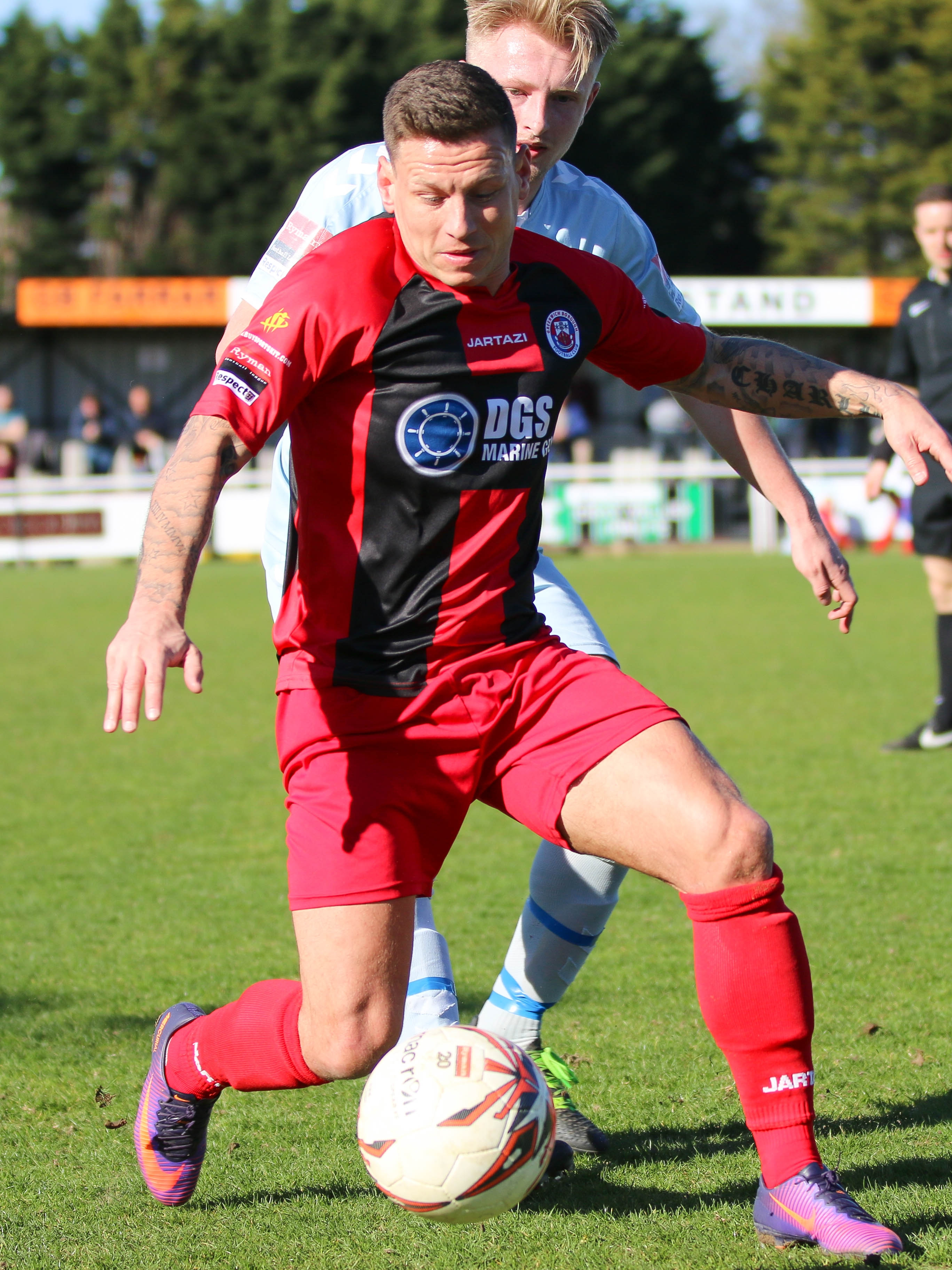
MacDonald playing for Greenwich Borough in 2017.

On 10 June 2016, MacDonald joined Isthmian Division One South side Greenwich Borough. He would spend a season and a half at the club, before financial constraints led to a number of players and staff leaving the club.

=== Cray Wanderers ===
On 10 January 2018, MacDonald signed for league rivals Cray Wanderers. He scored on his debut the same day, against VCD Athletic.

=== VCD Athletic ===
MacDonald joined VCD Athletic for the 2018–19 season, scoring twice on his debut against Ramsgate.

=== Glebe ===
MacDonald joined Glebe for the 2020–21 season.

=== Barking ===
MacDonald joined Barking for the 2021-22 season.

== Coaching career ==
MacDonald previously coached at Bobby Bowry's Volenti Academy. As of the start of the 25-26 season, he now coaches at IFA academy in Dubai.

== Personal life ==
During his time as a player at Oldham Athletic, MacDonald studied for and obtained a degree in Professional Sports Writing & Broadcasting from Staffordshire University.

== Honours ==
Charlton Athletic

- Football League First Division: 1999–2000

Crawley Town

- Southern League Premier Division: 2003–04

Brentford

- Football League Two: 2008–09

Barnet

- Conference Premier: 2014–15

Individual

- Charlton Athletic Young Player of the Year: 1999–2000
- Football League Two Player of the Month: February 2009
