= Ben May (footballer) =

English footballer (born 1984)

Personal information
- Full name: Ben Steven May
- Date of birth: 10 March 1984 (age 42)
- Place of birth: Gravesend, England
- Height: 6 ft 1 in (1.85 m)
- Position: Striker

Youth career
- 1998–1999: Southampton
- 1999–2000: Fulham
- 2000–2001: Millwall

Senior career*
Years	Team	Apps	(Gls)
2001–2008	Millwall	78	(14)
2003	→ Colchester United (loan)	6	(0)
2003–2004	→ Brentford (loan)	41	(7)
2004	→ Colchester United (loan)	14	(1)
2004–2005	→ Brentford (loan)	10	(1)
2007	→ Scunthorpe United (loan)	5	(0)
2008–2010	Scunthorpe United	40	(3)
2010–2012	Stevenage	27	(1)
2012	→ Barnet (loan)	11	(4)
2012–2013	Dover Athletic	40	(21)
2013–2015	Ebbsfleet United	30	(5)
2015–2016	Bromley	25	(3)
Total		327	(60)
- * Club domestic league appearances and goals

Ben Steven May (born 10 March 1984) is an English former professional footballer who played as a striker.

May began his career at Southampton's youth academy in 1998, before spending a year at Fulham's centre of excellence. In 2000, he joined Millwall's youth set-up and signed his first professional contract ahead of the 2002–03 season, making his debut in August 2002. During his six-year spell at Millwall, he was loaned out to Brentford and Colchester United. In September 2007, May joined Scunthorpe United on a three-month loan agreement, which was made permanent in January 2008. His time at Scunthorpe was disrupted by injuries, and he was released in May 2010.

May signed for Stevenage on a free transfer in October 2010 and was part of the squad that earned promotion to League One during the 2010–11 season. He spent two months on loan at League Two club Barnet in March 2012. He was released by Stevenage and subsequently signed for Dover Athletic ahead of the 2012–13 season. After one season at Dover, he joined Ebbsfleet United in June 2013, where he spent two years. He signed for Bromley in January 2015 and spent a year and a half playing there before becoming the club's fitness coach.

== Early life ==
May was born in Gravesend, Kent. He was educated at Leigh CTC School in Dartford. During his youth, May cited Alan Shearer and Ian Wright as his favourite footballers.

== Club career ==
=== Millwall ===
May started his career at Southampton's youth academy in 1998, and went on to spend one season at Fulham's centre of excellence. In 2000, at the age of 16, May moved to Millwall, progressing through the youth system and onto the periphery of the first team. He made his debut for Millwall at the start of the 2002–03 season, coming on as a 62nd-minute substitute in Millwall's 0–0 draw away to Watford on 13 August 2002. May scored his first goal in the club's following match against Ipswich Town, giving Millwall the lead in a game that ended 1–1. The club's website reported that "May was perfectly placed to stab home from close range after Neil Harris worked well to carve out an opening". He joined Colchester United on loan on 27 March 2003, with the agreement running until the end of the season. He made his Colchester debut two days later, playing the full match as Colchester secured a 1–0 victory over Swindon Town. May made five further appearances for Colchester, before returning to Millwall in May 2003.

May did not feature for Millwall at the start of the 2003–04 season and was loaned to Brentford on 25 August 2003. He joined the club on an initial three-month loan deal. He made his debut in Brentford's 2–1 home victory against Oldham Athletic, playing the full match. May scored his first goal for Brentford on 6 September 2003, in a 3–1 defeat to Plymouth Argyle, equalising briefly to make the score 1–1. He received the first red card of his career when he was sent off for violent conduct in a Football League Trophy match against Barnet on 14 October 2003. His loan was extended until the end of the 2003–04 season on 27 November 2003. Millwall manager Dennis Wise stated: "He will do very well under Brentford manager Wally Downes and will learn a lot under him. I didn't feel he was quite ready for our first team just yet". He scored seven goals in 43 appearances as Brentford finished the season in 17th place. He returned to his parent club on 13 May 2004.

Ahead of the 2004–05 campaign, May rejoined Colchester United on a two-month loan, having impressed in a pre-season friendly against Charlton Athletic. He scored his first goal for the club in a 3–1 victory at AFC Bournemouth on 11 September 2004. His loan was extended, and he made 15 appearances, scoring twice. During the spell, May was charged with violent conduct following "a brawl that broke out late in the game following an off-the-ball incident" against Blackpool and served a three-match suspension. Colchester were also fined £6,000 for failing to control their players. In December 2004, May returned to Brentford on loan, where he had spent the previous season. His loan spell was subsequently extended for a further month in January 2005. The agreement was extended twice, with Brentford manager Martin Allen "delighted" with May's development. He made 16 appearances and scored once before returning to Millwall in March 2005. May played eight times for Millwall towards the latter stages of the 2004–05 season, scoring a penalty in a 4–3 home victory against Crewe Alexandra on 9 April 2005.

Millwall exercised the option to extend May's contract on 18 May 2005, keeping him at the club for the 2005–06 season. He finished the season as Millwall's top goalscorer with 11 goals in 44 games, though the team were relegated to League One after finishing 23rd. In April 2006, May was offered a new two-year contract, which he signed after discussions with incoming manager Nigel Spackman in May 2006. Ahead of the 2006–07 season, May injured his shoulder in pre-season training, missing the club's pre-season tour of Iceland and the first two months of the season. He returned on 31 October 2006, scoring with his first touch after coming on as a substitute in a 2–0 Football League Trophy win against Bournemouth. After Millwall's 2–0 home win against Bradford City, a game in which May assisted Filipe Morais in scoring Millwall's first goal, new manager Willie Donachie praised both May and Darren Byfield as "committed, honest players". May scored the only goal in a 1–0 victory at Yeovil Town on 3 February 2007, but suffered an ankle injury in the same match, ruling him out for the rest of the 2006–07 season. However, he returned as a substitute on the final day, assisting a goal in a 2–2 draw at Bradford City. May scored four times in 19 appearances in a season disrupted by injuries.

After making a number of substitute appearances at the start of the 2007–08 season, May joined Championship club Scunthorpe United on a three-month loan deal. He made his debut in Scunthorpe's 1–0 win at Colchester United on 29 September 2007. May made five appearances for Scunthorpe, but was recalled by Millwall on 2 November 2007 due to a number of injuries in their squad. On his return to Millwall, May played in four games for the club, scoring one goal and assisting another in a 2–1 FA Cup home victory against Walsall on 15 January 2008, his last match for the club. During his seven years at Millwall, May scored 19 goals in 95 appearances.

=== Scunthorpe United ===
May signed a two-and-a-half-year contract with Scunthorpe United on 18 January 2008, for an undisclosed fee. The day after signing, May made his debut for the club, coming on as a 58th-minute substitute in a 2–0 defeat against Wolverhampton Wanderers. He scored his first goal for the club in a 2–1 defeat to Ipswich Town on 22 March 2008, a consolation goal in stoppage time. May made 21 appearances for Scunthorpe during the second half of the 2007–08 season, six of which were starts, scoring once. May featured predominantly as a substitute during the first half of Scunthorpe's 2008–09 season, scoring his first goal of the season in a 4–0 FA Cup victory against Alfreton Town on 29 November 2008. He sustained an ankle ligament injury on 15 January 2009, ruling him out of the first team for two months. Following his return, May made four late substitute appearances, although he was not involved in Scunthorpe's play-off campaign, as the club were promoted back to the Championship with a 3–2 victory over May's former club, Millwall, in May 2009. May made 29 appearances during the 2008–09 season, scoring four goals.

Ahead of the 2009–10 season, May scored five second-half goals in Scunthorpe's 12–0 pre-season victory against Brigg Town. He was an unused substitute in the club's first three fixtures of the 2009–10 season, before sustaining an ankle injury that ruled him out for a month. After returning to training in October 2009, May injured his other ankle, consequently ruling him out of first-team action for six weeks. He made his first appearance of the season as a late substitute in a 3–1 home defeat against West Bromwich Albion on 28 December 2009. It was his only appearance of the season, and he was released by Scunthorpe in May 2010. May made 51 appearances during his two-and-a-half-year spell at Scunthorpe, scoring five times.

=== Stevenage ===
May went on trial with League Two club Stevenage on 19 October 2010, and featured in a behind-closed-doors friendly against Dagenham & Redbridge, scoring in a 4–3 win. He signed for Stevenage on a permanent basis a day later. Due to his injury history, he signed a contract that was predominantly appearance-based. Stevenage manager Graham Westley stated: "It's fantastic to see a player putting their football before pound notes". May made his debut for Stevenage three days after signing for the club, coming on as an 80th-minute substitute in a 0–0 draw with Morecambe. May scored his first goal for Stevenage on 7 May 2011, in the club's 3–3 draw with Bury, a result that ensured Stevenage qualified for the play-offs in their first Football League season. May was injured in the act of scoring and was immediately substituted for Chris Beardsley. As a result, he missed Stevenage's three play-off matches, as the club secured promotion to League One following a 1–0 victory over Torquay United. His season was disrupted by injuries; he made 22 appearances, including seven starts.

Having made ten appearances for Stevenage in the opening six months of the 2011–12 season, May joined League Two club Barnet on loan on 10 March 2012, on an agreement until the end of the season. He made a scoring debut, converting from close range as Barnet came from a goal down to win 2–1 at Port Vale on 10 March 2012. May played regularly during his time at Barnet, making 11 appearances, as the club avoided relegation on the final day of the season. During his two-month spell, he scored four goals. He was released by Stevenage in May 2012.

=== Dover Athletic ===
Ahead of the 2012–13 season, May trialled with League Two club Gillingham, training with the first team for a number of weeks and playing in several pre-season friendlies. With no contract offered, he joined Conference South club Dover Athletic on a free transfer on 8 August 2012. May made his competitive debut for Dover in a 2–2 away draw against Sutton United on 21 August 2012, and scored his first goal in a 3–1 win at Eastleigh on 1 September 2012. He scored in seven consecutive games running from September to November 2012, five of which in the league and a further two in the FA Cup, He scored four times in March 2013, meaning he had scored over 20 goals for the season, the first time May had reached this milestone in his career. Dover finished third place and faced Eastleigh in the play-off semi-finals. May scored a dipping volley as Dover took a 3–1 lead in the first leg, chesting the ball with his back to goal, turning and hitting the ball from 25 yards past goalkeeper Ross Flitney. Dover progressed to the final, but lost 3–2 to Salisbury City after extra-time, with May featuring in all three play-off matches. During his one season at Dover, May finished the season as the club's leading goalscorer, scoring 24 times in 45 matches.

=== Ebbsfleet United ===
May signed for Conference South club Ebbsfleet United, his hometown club, on 5 June 2013. On joining Ebbsfleet, May stated: "It's all exciting stuff; Steve Brown showed an interest in signing me as soon as he knew he would be manager of Ebbsfleet. I'm currently enjoying a nice little break from football but I'm itching to lace my boots up and get back on the pitch". He made his Ebbsfleet debut as a substitute in the club's 1–1 draw with Eastbourne Borough on 24 August 2013, and scored his first goal in a 2–1 victory against Gosport Borough on 19 October 2013. May helped the club win the Kent Senior Cup with a 4–0 victory in the final over former club Dover Athletic on 5 May 2014. He scored 12 goals in 42 appearances during the season, as Ebbsfleet lost in the Conference South play-off final to Dover five days after the two clubs had met in the Kent Senior Cup. He signed a new contract with Ebbsfleet later that month.

Having not made any first-team appearances during the first half of the 2014–15 season due to injury, May's contract was cancelled by mutual consent on 14 January 2015. He stated he had enjoyed his time at Ebbsfleet, with his only regret being that injuries limited his involvement during his second season.

=== Bromley ===
Following his departure from Ebbsfleet, May signed for fellow Conference South club Bromley on 16 January 2015, the team for which his brother, Jay, had played the previous season. He made his Bromley debut the following day, coming on as a second-half substitute in a 2–1 away defeat to Whitehawk. May scored his first goal for the club in a 6–0 win at Staines Town on 7 February 2015. He made nine appearances during the second half of the season as Bromley secured promotion to the National League by winning the Conference South. May remained at Bromley for their first season in the National League during the 2015–16 season, although a back injury restricted him to 16 appearances, in which he scored twice.

== Coaching career ==
Whilst playing for Dover Athletic, May completed a diploma in personal training. May was appointed Bromley's strength and conditioning coach in 2016. The club finished as runners-up in the FA Trophy during the 2016–17 season, with the team being noted for its high fitness levels and late goals.

== Personal life ==
In January 2007, it was reported that May and Glen Johnson were caught at a B&Q store in Dartford, Kent, attempting to steal bathroom fittings. They both received £80 fines. Johnson later described the incident as a misunderstanding, explaining that they had swapped a toilet seat for a more expensive model without realising the price difference. When stopped by security and offered the choice of paying a fine or going to court, they opted to pay on-the-spot fines, although Johnson stated this made them "look guilty".

May owns a delicatessen in Eltham, London, which opened in 2023.

== Career statistics ==
Appearances and goals by club, season and competition
Club	Season	League			FA Cup		League Cup		Other		Total	
Club	Season	Division	Apps	Goals	Apps	Goals	Apps	Goals	Apps	Goals	Apps	Goals
Millwall	2002–03	First Division	10	1	1	0	1	0	0	0	12	1
Millwall	2003–04	First Division	0	0	0	0	0	0	0	0	0	0
Millwall	2004–05	Championship	8	1	0	0	0	0	0	0	8	1
Millwall	2005–06	Championship	39	10	2	0	3	1	0	0	44	11
Millwall	2006–07	League One	13	2	4	1	0	0	2 (Note: Appearance(s) in Football League Trophy)	1	19	4
Millwall	2007–08	League One	8	0	2	1	1	0	1	1	12	2
Millwall	Total		78	14	9	2	5	1	3	2	95	19
Colchester United (loan)	2002–03	Second Division	6	0	0	0	0	0	0	0	6	0
Brentford (loan)	2003–04	Second Division	41	7	1	0	0	0	1	0	43	7
Colchester United (loan)	2004–05	League One	14	1	0	0	1	1	0	0	15	2
Brentford (loan)	2004–05	League One	10	1	6	0	0	0	0	0	16	1
Scunthorpe United	2007–08	Championship	21	1	—		—		0	0	21	1
Scunthorpe United	2008–09	League One	23	2	1	1	1	0	4	1	29	4
Scunthorpe United	2009–10	Championship	1	0	0	0	0	0	0	0	1	0
Scunthorpe United	Total		45	3	1	1	1	0	4	1	51	5
Stevenage	2010–11	League Two	20	1	2	0	0	0	0	0	22	1
Stevenage	2011–12	League One	7	0	3	0	0	0	0	0	10	0
Stevenage	Total		27	1	5	0	0	0	0	0	32	1
Barnet (loan)	2011–12	League Two	11	4	—		—		0	0	11	4
Dover Athletic	2012–13	Conference South	40	21	2	2	—		5 (Note: Two appearances in FA Trophy; three appearances and one goal in 2013 Conference South play-offs)	1	47	24
Ebbsfleet United	2013–14	Conference South	30	5	4	0	—		8 (Note: Two appearances and one goal in FA Trophy; three appearances and five goals in Kent Senior Cup; three appearances and one goal in 2014 Conference South play-offs)	7	42	12
Ebbsfleet United	2014–15	Conference South	0	0	0	0	—		0	0	0	0
Ebbsfleet United	Total		30	5	4	0	0	0	8	7	42	12
Bromley	2014–15	Conference South	9	1	0	0	—		0	0	9	1
Bromley	2015–16	National League	16	2	0	0	—		0	0	16	2
Bromley	Total		25	3	0	0	0	0	0	0	25	3
Career totals			327	60	28	5	7	2	16	11	378	78

== Honours ==
Scunthorpe United

- Football League One play-offs: 2009
- Football League Trophy runner-up: 2008–09

Stevenage

- Football League Two play-offs: 2011

Bromley

- Conference South: 2014–15
