= 2001–02 Millwall F.C. season =

Millwall
2001–02 season
- Manager: Mark McGhee
- Stadium: The Den
- First Division: 4th
- FA Cup: Fourth round
- League Cup: Second round
- Top goalscorer: Steve Claridge (18)
- Average home league attendance: 13,380

During the 2001–02 English football season, Millwall competed in the First Division.

== Season summary ==
Millwall finished fourth and qualified for the First Division play-offs, but were defeated by Birmingham City in the semi-final.

== Final league table ==
Pos	Team	Pld	W	D	L	GF	GA	GD	Pts	Qualification or relegation
2	West Bromwich Albion (P)	46	27	8	11	61	29	+32	89	Promotion to the Premier League
3	Wolverhampton Wanderers	46	25	11	10	76	43	+33	86	Qualification for the First Division play-offs
4	Millwall	46	22	11	13	69	48	+21	77	Qualification for the First Division play-offs
5	Birmingham City (O, P)	46	21	13	12	70	49	+21	76	Qualification for the First Division play-offs
6	Norwich City	46	22	9	15	60	51	+9	75	Qualification for the First Division play-offs

Rules for classification: 1) Points; 2) Goal difference; 3) Goals scored
(O) Play-off winners; (P) Promoted

== Kit ==
Millwall's kit was manufactured by Strikeforce and sponsored by 24 Seven.

== Players ==
=== First-team squad ===
Squad at end of season

Note: Flags indicate national team as defined under FIFA eligibility rules; some limited exceptions apply. Players may hold more than one non-FIFA nationality.

No.	Pos.	Nation	Player
1	GK	ENG	Tony Warner (Note: Warner was born in Liverpool, England, but also qualified to represent Trinidad and Tobago internationally and made his international debut for Trinidad and Tobago in February 2006.)
2	DF	ENG	Matt Lawrence
3	DF	IRL	Robbie Ryan
4	MF	SAM	Tim Cahill (Note: Cahill was born in Sydney, Australia, but also qualified to represent Samoa, England, and the Republic of Ireland through his mother, father, and grandparents respectively, and represented Samoa (then called Western Samoa) at U-20 level, unsuccessfully attempted to overturn a FIFA ruling that prevented him from representing the Republic of Ireland during the 2001–02 season, changed his allegiance to Australia in 2003 following a change in FIFA's eligibility rules and made his international debut for Australia in March 2004.)
5	DF	ENG	Stuart Nethercott
6	DF	NIR	Joe Dolan (Note: Dolan was born in Southwark, England, but also qualified to represent Northern Ireland internationally and represented Northern Ireland at U-18 and U-21 level.)
7	MF	ENG	Paul Ifill (Note: Ifill was born in Brighton, England, but also qualified to represent Barbados internationally through his parents and made his international debut for Barbados in June 2004.)
8	MF	ENG	David Livermore
9	FW	ENG	Neil Harris
10	FW	IRL	Richard Sadlier
11	MF	IRL	Steven Reid (Note: Reid was born in Kingston upon Thames, England, and represented England at U-16 level, but also qualified to represent the Republic of Ireland internationally through his grandfather and made his international debut for the Republic of Ireland in 2001.)
12	DF	ENG	Darren Ward
13	GK	GLP	Willy Guéret
14	DF	WAL	Ryan Green
15	DF	ENG	Dave Tuttle
16	MF	BEL	Christophe Kinet
17	MF	ENG	Leke Odunsi

No.	Pos.	Nation	Player
18	DF	CAN	Marc Bircham (Note: Bircham was born in Brent, England, but also qualified to represent Canada internationally through his grandfather and made his international debut for Canada in April 1999.)
19	DF	ENG	Sean Dyche
20	DF	ENG	Ronnie Bull
21	FW	ENG	Leon Constantine
22	FW	NIR	Kevin Braniff
25	FW	ENG	Dion Dublin (on loan from Aston Villa)
26	MF	SCO	Peter Sweeney
27	DF	IRL	Alan Dunne
28	DF	ENG	Mark Phillips
29	MF	ENG	Stuart Booth
30	MF	ENG	Charley Hearn
31	DF	WAL	Matthew Rees
32	FW	ENG	Ben May
33	FW	NIR	Mark Hicks
34	DF	ENG	Paul Robinson
35	FW	ENG	Steve Claridge
37	GK	RSA	Chad Harpur

=== Left club during season ===
Note: Flags indicate national team as defined under FIFA eligibility rules; some limited exceptions apply. Players may hold more than one non-FIFA nationality.

No.	Pos.	Nation	Player
12	FW	ENG	Paul Moody (to Oxford United)
14	DF	AUS	Lucas Neill (to Blackburn Rovers)
23	MF	ENG	Phil Stamp (on loan from Middlesbrough)
23	DF	ENG	Richard Naylor (on loan from Ipswich Town)

No.	Pos.	Nation	Player
23	MF	IRL	Stephen McPhail (Note: McPhail was born in Westminster, England, but also qualified to represent the Republic of Ireland internationally and made his international debut for the Republic of Ireland in May 2000.) (on loan from Leeds United)
26	FW	VEN	Giovanni Savarese (released)
36	MF	ENG	Rio Alderton (released)
