= 2002–03 Millwall F.C. season =

Millwall
2002–03 season
- Chairman: Theo Paphitis
- Manager: Mark McGhee
- Stadium: The Den
- First Division: 9th
- FA Cup: Fourth round
- League Cup: First round
- Top goalscorer: Neil Harris (12)
- Average home league attendance: 8,512

The 2002–03 season saw Millwall compete in the Football League First Division where they finished in 9th position with 66 points.

== Final league table ==
Pos	Team	Pld	W	D	L	GF	GA	GD	Pts
7	Ipswich Town	46	19	13	14	80	64	+16	70
8	Norwich City	46	19	12	15	60	49	+11	69
9	Millwall	46	19	9	18	59	69	−10	66
10	Wimbledon	46	18	11	17	76	73	+3	65
11	Gillingham	46	16	14	16	56	65	−9	62

Updated to match(es) played on 11 May 2003. Source: Soccerway
Rules for classification: 1) points; 2) goal difference; 3) number of goals scored.

== Results ==
Millwall's score comes first

=== Legend ===
Win	Draw	Loss

=== Football League First Division ===
Match	Date	Opponent	Venue	Result	Attendance	Scorers
1	10 August 2002	Rotherham United	H	0–6	7,177	
2	13 August 2002	Watford	A	0–0	11,187	
3	17 August 2002	Gillingham	A	0–1	7,543	
4	24 August 2002	Ipswich Town	H	1–1	8,097	May
5	27 August 2002	Sheffield United	A	1–3	13,024	Ifill
6	31 August 2002	Grimsby Town	H	2–0	6,677	Claridge (2)
7	7 September 2002	Brighton & Hove Albion	H	1–0	8,822	Ward
8	14 September 2002	Portsmouth	A	0–1	17,201	
9	17 September 2002	Burnley	A	2–2	11,878	Livermore, Davies
10	21 September 2002	Walsall	H	0–3	7,525	
11	28 September 2002	Coventry City	A	3–2	13,562	Davies, Harris, Kinet
12	5 October 2002	Nottingham Forest	H	1–2	10,521	Davies
13	12 October 2002	Wimbledon	H	1–1	8,248	Nethercott
14	19 October 2002	Norwich City	A	1–3	20,448	Claridge
15	26 October 2002	Derby County	H	3–0	8,116	Wise, Harris (2)
16	30 October 2002	Sheffield Wednesday	A	1–0	16,791	Claridge
17	2 November 2002	Reading	A	0–2	13,081	
18	9 November 2002	Preston North End	H	2–1	7,554	Wise, Ifill
19	16 November 2002	Leicester City	H	2–2	10,772	Wise, Reid
20	23 November 2002	Stoke City	A	1–0	13,776	Reid
21	30 November 2002	Bradford City	H	1–0	8,510	Harris
22	7 December 2002	Crystal Palace	A	0–1	19,301	
23	14 December 2002	Leicester City	A	1–4	31,904	Claridge
24	21 December 2002	Wolverhampton Wanderers	H	1–1	9,091	Roberts
25	26 December 2002	Gillingham	A	2–2	10,947	Harris, Ryan
26	28 December 2002	Rotherham United	A	3–1	6,448	Harris, Claridge, Reid
27	1 January 2003	Ipswich Town	A	1–4	26,040	Reid
28	11 January 2003	Watford	H	4–0	9,030	Claridge, Ryan, Ifill, Sweeney
29	18 January 2003	Grimsby Town	A	2–0	4,993	Claridge (2)
30	1 February 2003	Sheffield United	H	1–0	9,102	Ifill
31	8 February 2003	Preston North End	A	1–2	13,117	Kinet
32	15 February 2003	Reading	H	0–2	7,038	
33	22 February 2003	Brighton & Hove Albion	A	0–1	6,751	
34	1 March 2003	Portsmouth	H	0–5	9,676	
35	4 March 2003	Burnley	H	1–1	6,045	Sadlier
36	8 March 2003	Walsall	A	2–1	6,647	Ifill, Harris
37	15 March 2003	Wimbledon	A	0–2	2,952	
38	18 March 2003	Norwich City	H	0–2	6,854	
39	22 March 2003	Sheffield Wednesday	H	3–0	7,338	Ifill, Reid (2)
40	5 April 2003	Bradford City	A	1–0	10,676	Harris
41	13 April 2003	Stoke City	H	3–1	8,725	Harris, Roberts, Livermore
42	16 April 2003	Derby County	A	2–1	21,014	Harris, McCammon
43	19 April 2003	Wolverhampton Wanderers	A	0–3	27,015	
44	21 April 2003	Crystal Palace	H	3–2	10,670	Harris, McCammon, Cahill
45	26 April 2003	Nottingham Forest	A	3–3	29,463	Harris, Cahill, Nethercott
46	4 May 2003	Coventry City	H	2–0	9,220	Cahill, Craig

=== FA Cup ===
Match	Date	Opponent	Venue	Result	Attendance	Scorers
R3	4 January 2003	Cambridge United	A	1–1	6,864	Claridge
R3 Replay	14 January 2003	Cambridge United	H	3–2	7,031	Claridge, Ifill, Robinson
R4	25 January 2003	Southampton	A	1–1	23,809	Claridge
R4 Replay	5 February 2003	Southampton	H	1–2	10,197	Reid

=== Football League Cup ===
Match	Date	Opponent	Venue	Result	Attendance	Scorers
R1	10 September 2002	Rushden & Diamonds	A	0 – 0 (3 – 5 pens)	2,731	

== Players ==
=== First-team squad ===
Squad at end of season

Note: Flags indicate national team as defined under FIFA eligibility rules; some limited exceptions apply. Players may hold more than one non-FIFA nationality.

No.	Pos.	Nation	Player
1	GK	ENG	Tony Warner (Note: Warner was born in Liverpool, England, but also qualified to represent Trinidad and Tobago internationally and made his international debut for Trinidad and Tobago in February 2006.)
2	DF	ENG	Matt Lawrence
3	DF	IRL	Robbie Ryan
4	MF	SAM	Tim Cahill (Note: Cahill was born in Sydney, Australia, but also qualified to represent Samoa, England, and the Republic of Ireland through his mother, father, and grandparents respectively, and represented Samoa (then called Western Samoa) at U-20 level, unsuccessfully attempted to overturn a FIFA ruling that prevented him from representing the Republic of Ireland during the 2001–02 season, changed his allegiance to Australia in 2003 following a change in FIFA's eligibility rules and made his international debut for Australia in March 2004.)
5	DF	ENG	Stuart Nethercott
6	DF	NIR	Joe Dolan (Note: Dolan was born in Southwark, England, but also qualified to represent Northern Ireland internationally and represented Northern Ireland at U-18 and U-21 level.)
7	MF	ENG	Paul Ifill (Note: Ifill was born in Brighton, England, but also qualified to represent Barbados internationally through his parents and made his international debut for Barbados in June 2004.)
8	MF	ENG	David Livermore
9	FW	ENG	Neil Harris
10	FW	IRL	Richard Sadlier
11	MF	IRL	Steven Reid (Note: Reid was born in Kingston upon Thames, England, and represented England at U-16 level, but also qualified to represent the Republic of Ireland internationally through his grandfather and made his international debut for the Republic of Ireland in 2001.)
12	DF	ENG	Darren Ward
13	GK	GLP	Willy Guéret
14	MF	ENG	Andy Roberts
15	FW	ENG	Moses Ashikodi (Note: Ashikodi was born in Lagos, Nigeria, but was raised in England and also qualified to represent Antigua and Barbuda internationally, and represented England at U-16, U-17, U-18 and U-19 level before making his international debut for Antigua and Barbuda in September 2012.)
16	MF	BEL	Christophe Kinet
19	MF	ENG	Dennis Wise

No.	Pos.	Nation	Player
20	DF	ENG	Ronnie Bull
22	FW	NIR	Kevin Braniff
23	FW	ENG	Mark McCammon (Note: McCammon was born in Barnet, England, but also qualified to represent Barbados internationally and made his international debut for Barbados in 2006.)
25	MF	ENG	Marvin Elliott (Note: Elliott was born in Wandsworth, England, but also qualified to represent Jamaica internationally and made his international debut for Jamaica in October 2011.)
26	MF	SCO	Peter Sweeney
27	DF	IRL	Alan Dunne
28	DF	ENG	Mark Phillips
29	MF	ENG	Stuart Booth
30	MF	ENG	Charley Hearn
31	DF	WAL	Matthew Rees
32	FW	ENG	Ben May
33	DF	SCO	Sergei Baltacha (Note: Baltacha was born in Kyiv, Ukrainian SSR, Soviet Union (now Ukraine), but was raised in England between the ages of 9 and 11 and Scotland from the age of 11 and also qualified to represent Russia, Wales, and Northern Ireland internationally, and represented Scotland at U-21 level.)
34	DF	ENG	Paul Robinson
35	DF	ENG	Tony Craig
36	FW	ENG	Steve Claridge
37	GK	RSA	Chad Harpur
—	MF	AUS	Daniel Severino

=== Left club during season ===
Note: Flags indicate national team as defined under FIFA eligibility rules; some limited exceptions apply. Players may hold more than one non-FIFA nationality.

No.	Pos.	Nation	Player
15	DF	ENG	Dave Tuttle (retired)
17	MF	ENG	Leke Odunsi (to Kingstonian)
18	FW	ENG	Kevin Davies (on loan from Southampton)

No.	Pos.	Nation	Player
21	MF	IRL	Kevin Grogan (released)
33	FW	NIR	Mark Hicks (released)
33	DF	ENG	Glen Johnson (on loan from West Ham United)

== Squad statistics ==
No.	Pos.	Name	League		FA Cup		League Cup		Total	
No.	Pos.	Name	Apps	Goals	Apps	Goals	Apps	Goals	Apps	Goals
1	GK	(England) Tony Warner	46	0	4	0	1	0	51	0
2	DF	(England) Matthew Lawrence	31(2)	0	4	0	1	0	36(2)	0
3	DF	(Republic of Ireland) Robbie Ryan	36(5)	2	4	0	1	0	41(5)	2
4	MF	(Samoa) Tim Cahill	9(2)	3	0	0	0	0	9(2)	3
5	DF	(England) Stuart Nethercott	34(2)	2	1	0	1	0	36(2)	2
6	DF	(Northern Ireland) Joe Dolan	2	0	0	0	0	0	2	0
7	MF	(England) Paul Ifill	45	6	4	1	1	0	50	7
8	MF	(England) David Livermore	41	2	4	0	1	0	46	2
9	FW	(England) Neil Harris	34(6)	12	1	0	0	0	35(6)	12
10	FW	(Republic of Ireland) Richard Sadlier	2(3)	1	0	0	0	0	2(3)	1
11	DF	(Republic of Ireland) Steven Reid	19(1)	6	4	1	0	0	23(1)	7
12	DF	(England) Darren Ward	36(3)	1	4	0	1	0	41(3)	1
13	GK	(Guadeloupe) Willy Gueret	0	0	0	0	0	0	0	0
14	MF	(England) Andy Roberts	31(2)	2	0	0	1	0	32(2)	2
15	FW	(England) Moses Ashikodi	0(5)	0	0	0	0	0	0(5)	0
15	DF	(England) Dave Tuttle	1	0	0	0	0	0	1	0
16	MF	(Belgium) Christophe Kinet	10(10)	2	1(1)	0	1	0	12(11)	2
17	MF	(England) Leke Odunsi	0	0	0	0	0	0	0	0
18	FW	(England) Kevin Davies	6(3)	3	0	0	0	0	6(3)	3
19	MF	(England) Dennis Wise	28(1)	3	3	0	0	0	31(1)	3
20	DF	(England) Ronnie Bull	9(3)	0	0	0	0(1)	0	9(4)	0
21	MF	(Republic of Ireland) Kevin Grogan	0	0	0	0	0	0	0	0
22	FW	(Northern Ireland) Kevin Braniff	5(5)	0	1(1)	0	0	0	0	0
23	FW	(England) Mark McCammon	7	2	0	0	0	0	7	2
25	MF	(England) Marvin Elliott	0(1)	0	0	0	0	0	0(1)	0
26	MF	(Scotland) Peter Sweeney	1(4)	1	0(1)	0	0	0	1(5)	1
27	DF	(Republic of Ireland) Alan Dunne	3(1)	0	0	0	0	0	3(1)	0
28	DF	(England) Mark Phillips	7	0	0	0	1	0	8	0
30	MF	(England) Charley Hearn	6(3)	0	2(2)	0	0(1)	0	8(6)	0
31	DF	(Wales) Matthew Rees	0	0	0	0	0	0	0	0
32	FW	(England) Ben May	4(6)	1	0(1)	0	1	0	0	0
33	DF	(England) Glen Johnson	7(1)	0	0	0	0	0	7(1)	0
33	DF	(Scotland) Sergei Baltacha	1(1)	0	0(1)	0	0	0	1(2)	0
34	DF	(England) Paul Robinson	12(2)	0	3(1)	1	0	0	15(3)	1
35	DF	(England) Tony Craig	2	1	0	0	0	0	2	1
36	FW	(England) Steve Claridge	31(13)	9	4	3	0(1)	0	35(14)	12
37	GK	(South Africa) Chad Harpur	0	0	0	0	0	0	0	0
