= 2003–04 Millwall F.C. season =

Millwall
2003–04 season
- Chairman: Theo Paphitis
- Manager: Mark McGhee (until 15 October); Dennis Wise (player-manager)
- Stadium: The Den
- First Division: 10th
- FA Cup: Runners-up
- League Cup: First round
- Top goalscorer: League: Tim Cahill and Neil Harris (9); All: Tim Cahill (12)

During the 2003–04 English football season, Millwall competed in the Football League First Division, the second tier of English football.

== Season summary ==
Despite having spent the previous seasons chasing promotion to the Premiership, Mark McGhee left Millwall by "mutual consent" in October with the club just six points behind league leaders Sheffield United with 14 games played. His replacement, player-manager Dennis Wise, led Millwall to a final 10th place, four points off the play-offs. The club enjoyed greater success in the FA Cup, reaching the final for the first time in their history, to face Manchester United. Millwall, who were missing 16 players through injury and suspension, were unable to create many opportunities and lost 3-0 to a United side which had finished third in the Premier League that season.

Curtis Weston, a boyhood United fan, became the youngest player to ever appear in an FA Cup final when he came on a substitute for Wise in the 89th minute. Weston, aged 17 years 119 days, beat the 125-year-old record previously held by James F. M. Prinsep, who appeared in the 1879 final for Clapham Rovers aged 17 years and 245 days; Weston defeated Prinsep's record by 126 days.

As United had already qualified for the Champions League, Millwall gained European qualification for the first time in their history, entering the UEFA Cup in the first round.

== Final league table ==
Pos	Team	Pld	W	D	L	GF	GA	GD	Pts	Promotion, qualification or relegation
8	Sheffield United	46	20	11	15	65	56	+9	71	
9	Reading	46	20	10	16	55	57	−2	70	
10	Millwall	46	18	15	13	55	48	+7	69	Qualification for the UEFA Cup first round (Note: Since the FA Cup winners Manchester United qualified for the Champions League, their place in the UEFA Cup went to Millwall, who were the FA Cup runners-up.)
11	Stoke City	46	18	12	16	58	55	+3	66	
12	Coventry City	46	17	14	15	67	54	+13	65	

Source: Soccerway
Rules for classification: 1) points; 2) goal difference; 3) number of goals scored.

== Kit ==
Strikeforce remained Millwall's kit sponsors. London-based stationery retailer Ryman became kit sponsors.

== Players ==
=== First-team squad ===
Squad at end of season

Note: Flags indicate national team as defined under FIFA eligibility rules; some limited exceptions apply. Players may hold more than one non-FIFA nationality.

No.	Pos.	Nation	Player
1	GK	ENG	Tony Warner (Note: Warner was born in Liverpool, England, but also qualified to represent Trinidad and Tobago internationally and made his international debut for Trinidad and Tobago in February 2006.)
2	DF	ENG	Matt Lawrence
3	DF	IRL	Robbie Ryan
4	MF	AUS	Tim Cahill (Note: Cahill was born in Sydney, Australia, but also qualified to represent Samoa, England, and the Republic of Ireland through his mother, father, and grandparents respectively, and represented Samoa (then called Western Samoa) at U-20 level, unsuccessfully attempted to overturn a FIFA ruling that prevented him from representing the Republic of Ireland during the 2001–02 season, changed his allegiance to Australia in 2003 following a change in FIFA's eligibility rules and made his international debut for Australia in March 2004.)
6	DF	NIR	Joe Dolan (Note: Dolan was born in Southwark, England, but also qualified to represent Northern Ireland internationally and represented Northern Ireland at U-18 and U-21 level.)
7	MF	BRB	Paul Ifill (Note: Ifill was born in Brighton, England, but also qualified to represent Barbados internationally through his parents and made his international debut for Barbados in June 2004.)
8	MF	ENG	David Livermore
9	FW	ENG	Neil Harris
10	FW	ENG	Danny Dichio
11	MF	ENG	Curtis Weston
12	DF	ENG	Darren Ward
13	GK	GLP	Willy Guéret
14	MF	ENG	Andy Roberts
16	FW	FRA	Abou Fofana
17	DF	AUS	Kevin Muscat (Note: Muscat was born in Crawley, England, but was raised in Australia and represented Australia at U-20 and U-23 level before making his international debut for Australia in September 1994.)
18	FW	ENG	John Sutton

No.	Pos.	Nation	Player
19	MF	ENG	Dennis Wise (player-manager)
21	FW	ENG	Nick Chadwick (on loan from Everton)
22	FW	NIR	Kevin Braniff
23	FW	ENG	Mark McCammon (Note: McCammon was born in Barnet, England, but also qualified to represent Barbados internationally and made his international debut for Barbados in 2006.)
25	MF	ENG	Marvin Elliott (Note: Elliott was born in Wandsworth, England, but also qualified to represent Jamaica internationally and made his international debut for Jamaica in October 2011.)
26	MF	SCO	Peter Sweeney
27	DF	IRL	Alan Dunne
28	DF	ENG	Mark Phillips
29	FW	BEL	Bob Peeters
30	MF	ENG	Charley Hearn
33	GK	ENG	Andy Marshall
34	DF	ENG	Paul Robinson
35	DF	ENG	Tony Craig
37	MF	IRL	Barry Cogan
38	MF	JAM	Trevor Robinson
39	FW	IRL	Mark Quigley

=== Left club during season ===
Note: Flags indicate national team as defined under FIFA eligibility rules; some limited exceptions apply. Players may hold more than one non-FIFA nationality.

No.	Pos.	Nation	Player
5	DF	ENG	Stuart Nethercott (to Wycombe Wanderers)
10	FW	IRL	Richard Sadlier (retired)
11	FW	ENG	Noel Whelan (to Derby County)

No.	Pos.	Nation	Player
20	DF	ENG	Ronnie Bull (to Brentford)
31	GK	ENG	David McCartney (to Hornchurch)
42	DF	BRA	Juan (on loan from Arsenal)

=== Reserve squad ===
Note: Flags indicate national team as defined under FIFA eligibility rules; some limited exceptions apply. Players may hold more than one non-FIFA nationality.

No.	Pos.	Nation	Player
15	FW	ENG	Moses Ashikodi (Note: Ashikodi was born in Lagos, Nigeria, but was raised in England and also qualified to represent Antigua and Barbuda internationally, and represented England at U-16, U-17, U-18 and U-19 level before making his international debut for Antigua and Barbuda in September 2012.)
31	DF	WAL	Matthew Rees
32	FW	ENG	Ben May
36	DF	IRL	Tim Clancy

No.	Pos.	Nation	Player
40	MF	ENG	Cherno Samba (Note: Samba was born in Banjul, Gambia, but was raised in England from the age of 6 and represented England at U-16, U-17, U-18, U-19 and U-20 level before making his international debut for Gambia in September 2008.)
41	MF	CIV	Alex Tiesse
45	MF	ENG	Ellis Lattimore

== Awards ==
At the end of the season, defender Darren Ward was named the club's player of the year.
