= 2000–01 Millwall F.C. season =

Millwall
2000–01 season
- Chairman: Theo Paphitis
- Manager: Keith Stevens and Alan McLeary (until 17 September); Ray Harford (caretaker from 17 to 25 September); Mark McGhee (from 25 September)
- Stadium: The Den
- Second Division: 1st (champions)
- FA Cup: Second round
- League Cup: Second round
- LDV Vans Trophy: Second round (Southern Area)
- Top goalscorer: League: Neil Harris (27); All: Neil Harris (28)

During the 2000–01 English football season, Millwall F.C. competed in the Football League Second Division.

== Season summary ==
In the 2000–01 season, Millwall controversially sacked joint managers Keith Stevens and Alan McLeary in September, stating that the club didn't believe Stevens and McLeary could meet Millwall's target goal. Ray Harford was appointed caretaker manager on a temporary basis and it seemed possible that he might be given the job permanently, but Mark McGhee was named as their replacement and eight months later the club won promotion as Division Two champions after five years in the lower tier of the league.

== Final league table ==
Pos	Team	Pld	W	D	L	GF	GA	GD	Pts	Qualification or relegation
1	Millwall (C, P)	46	28	9	9	89	38	+51	93	Promotion to Football League First Division
2	Rotherham United (P)	46	27	10	9	79	55	+24	91	Promotion to Football League First Division
3	Reading	46	25	11	10	86	52	+34	86	Qualification for the Second Division play-offs
4	Walsall (O, P)	46	23	12	11	79	50	+29	81	Qualification for the Second Division play-offs
5	Stoke City	46	21	14	11	74	49	+25	77	Qualification for the Second Division play-offs

Rules for classification: 1) Points; 2) Goal difference; 3) Goals scored
(C) Champions; (O) Play-off winners; (P) Promoted

== Results ==
Millwall's score comes first

=== Legend ===
Win	Draw	Loss

=== FA Cup ===
Round	Date	Opponent	Venue	Result	Attendance	Goalscorers
R1	19 November 2000	Leigh RMI	H	3–0	6,907	Harris, Bircham, Moody
R2	10 December 2000	Wycombe Wanderers	H	0–0	7,819	
R2R	19 December 2000	Wycombe Wanderers	A	1–2	3,878	Dolan

=== League Cup ===
Round	Date	Opponent	Venue	Result	Attendance	Goalscorers
R1 1st Leg	22 August 2000	Brighton & Hove Albion	A	2–1	6,039	Braniff, Livermore
R1 2nd Leg	5 September 2000	Brighton & Hove Albion	H	1–1 (won 3–2 on agg)	5,227	Kinet
R2 1st Leg	19 September 2000	Ipswich Town	H	2–0	8,068	Ifill, Cahill
R2 2nd Leg	26 September 2000	Ipswich Town	A	0–5 (lost 2–5 on agg)	13,008	

=== Football League Trophy ===
Round	Date	Opponent	Venue	Result	Attendance	Goalscorers
Southern R1	5 December 2000	Northampton Town	H	4–1	2,369	Kinet (3, 1 pen), Sadlier
Southern R2	9 January 2001	Swindon Town	H	0–0 (lost 2–3 on pens)	2,394	

== Players ==
=== First-team squad ===
Squad at end of season

Note: Flags indicate national team as defined under FIFA eligibility rules; some limited exceptions apply. Players may hold more than one non-FIFA nationality.

No.	Pos.	Nation	Player
1	GK	ENG	Tony Warner (Note: Warner was born in Liverpool, England, but also qualified to represent Trinidad and Tobago internationally and made his international debut for Trinidad and Tobago in February 2006.)
2	MF	CAN	Marc Bircham (Note: Bircham was born in Brent, England, but also qualified to represent Canada internationally through his grandfather and made his international debut for Canada in April 1999.)
3	MF	SKN	Bobby Bowry (Note: Bowry was born in Croydon, England, but also qualified to represent Saint Kitts and Nevis internationally and made his international debut for Saint Kitts and Nevis in 2000.)
4	MF	SAM	Tim Cahill (Note: Cahill was born in Sydney, Australia, but also qualified to represent Samoa, England, and the Republic of Ireland through his mother, father, and grandparents respectively, and represented Samoa (then called Western Samoa) at U-20 level, unsuccessfully attempted to overturn a FIFA ruling that prevented him from representing the Republic of Ireland during the 2001–02 season, changed his allegiance to Australia in 2003 following a change in FIFA's eligibility rules and made his international debut for Australia in March 2004.)
5	DF	ENG	Dave Tuttle
6	DF	NIR	Joe Dolan (Note: Dolan was born in Southwark, England, but also qualified to represent Northern Ireland internationally and represented Northern Ireland at U-18 and U-21 level.)
7	FW	ENG	Steve Claridge (on loan from Portsmouth)
8	MF	ENG	Matthew Lawrence
9	FW	ENG	Neil Harris
10	MF	BEL	Christophe Kinet
11	MF	ENG	Paul Ifill (Note: Ifill was born in Brighton, England, but also qualified to represent Barbados internationally through his parents and made his international debut for Barbados in June 2004.)
12	FW	ENG	Paul Moody
13	GK	GLP	Willy Guéret
14	MF	AUS	Lucas Neill
15	DF	ENG	Stuart Nethercott
16	FW	ENG	Tony Cottee
17	MF	ENG	Leke Odunsi
18	MF	IRL	Steven Reid (Note: Reid was born in Kingston upon Thames, England, and represented England at U-16 level, but also qualified to represent the Republic of Ireland internationally through his grandfather and made his international debut for the Republic of Ireland in 2001.)
19	DF	IRL	Robbie Ryan

No.	Pos.	Nation	Player
20	FW	IRL	Richard Sadlier
21	FW	ENG	Leon Constantine
22	GK	ENG	Phil Smith
23	DF	ENG	Jamie Stuart
24	DF	ENG	Sean Dyche
25	MF	BRB	Michael Gilkes (Note: Gilkes was born in Hackney, England, but also qualified to represent Barbados internationally and made his international debut for Barbados in 2000.)
26	MF	ENG	David Livermore
27	DF	IRL	Alan Dunne
28	DF	ENG	Mark Phillips
29	MF	ENG	Byron Bubb (Note: Bubb was born in Harrow, England, but also qualified to represent Grenada internationally and made his international debut for Grenada in 2004.)
30	DF	ENG	Ronnie Bull
31	DF	WAL	Matthew Rees
32	DF	GUY	Leon Cort (Note: Cort was born in Southwark, England, but also qualified to represent Guyana internationally and made his international debut for Guyana in 2010.)
33	FW	NIR	Mark Hicks
34	FW	NIR	Kevin Braniff
35	FW	IRL	Darren Meade
36	FW	ENG	Tommy Tyne
37	GK	ENG	Stuart Nelson
38	MF	ENG	Charley Hearn

=== Left club during season ===
Note: Flags indicate national team as defined under FIFA eligibility rules; some limited exceptions apply. Players may hold more than one non-FIFA nationality.

No. / Pos. / Nation / Player; 7 / DF / IRL / Scott Fitzgerald (Note: Fitzgerald was born in Westminster, England, but also qualified to represent the Republic of Ireland internationally and represented the Republic of Ireland at U-21 and B level.) (to Colchester United)	No. / Pos. / Nation / Player; 16 / FW / ENG / Sam Parkin (on loan from Chelsea)
