= Baltacha =

Baltacha (Russian: Балтача) is a family name of Tatar origin, derived from the Turkic word baltacı, meaning "a person skilled with an axe", from balta: "axe", i.e., "woodcutter", "axe-maker", "carpenter", halberdier.

Notable people with the surname include:

- Sergei Pavlovich Baltacha (born 1958), the former USSR football player, Dynamo Kyiv
- Sergei Baltacha Jr. (born 1979), son of Sergei Pavlovich Baltacha, football player
- Elena Baltacha (1983–2014), daughter of Sergei Pavlovich Baltacha, tennis player

== See also ==
- Baltacı (disambiguation)
