= Sergei Baltacha =

Sergei Baltacha may refer to:

- Sergei Baltacha (footballer, born 1958), former USSR, Dynamo Kyiv, Ipswich Town and St Johnstone football player
- Sergei Baltacha (footballer, born 1979), Ukrainian born Scottish football player, formerly with St. Mirren
