= Steven Reid =

Footballer (born 1981)

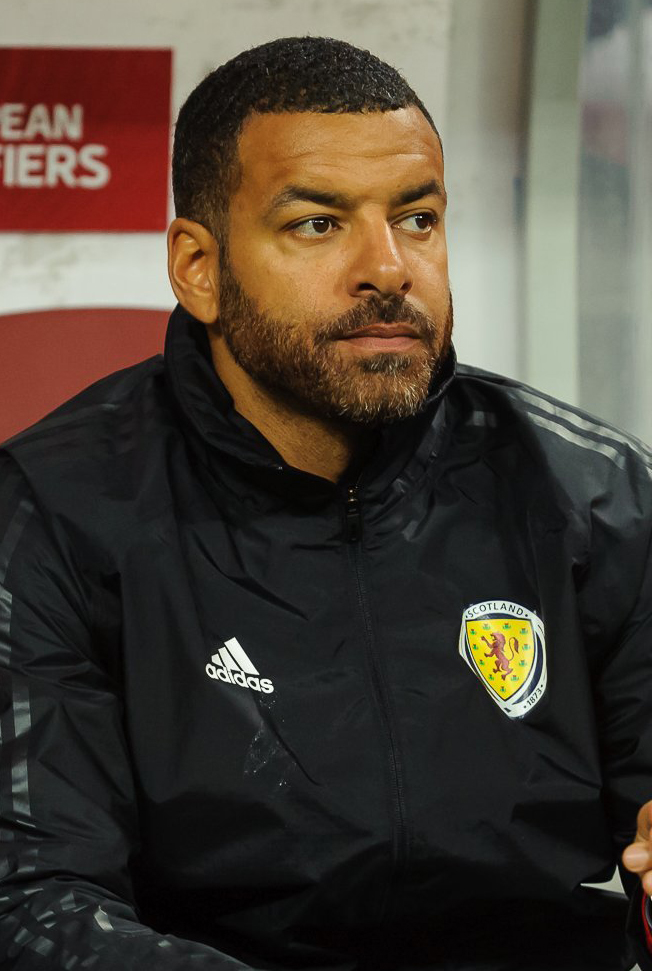
- Reid as a coach of Scotland in 2019

Personal information
- Full name: Steven John Reid
- Date of birth: 10 March 1981 (age 45)
- Place of birth: Kingston upon Thames, England
- Height: 5 ft 11 in (1.80 m)
- Positions: Wide midfielder; central midfielder; right back

Youth career
- –1998: Millwall

Senior career*
Years	Team	Apps	(Gls)
1998–2003	Millwall	139	(18)
2003–2010	Blackburn Rovers	113	(6)
2009	→ Queens Park Rangers (loan)	2	(0)
2010	→ West Bromwich Albion (loan)	10	(1)
2010–2014	West Bromwich Albion	82	(2)
2014–2015	Burnley	7	(0)
Total		343	(27)

International career
1997–1998	England U16	2	(0)
2001–2003	Republic of Ireland U21	3	(0)
2001–2008	Republic of Ireland	23	(2)

Managerial career
- 2021: Nottingham Forest (caretaker)
- * Club domestic league appearances and goals

Steven John Reid (born 10 March 1981) is a former professional footballer who played as a right back, having previously played most of his career in midfield.

Reid began his career with Millwall in 1998, moving to Blackburn Rovers five years later. After an initial loan spell, he joined West Bromwich Albion in 2010. His career was troubled by injury; he once notably played for 45 minutes against Arsenal at the Emirates Stadium with a broken leg. Reid retired in 2015 after a season with Burnley.

Born in England, he was capped 23 times at international level for the Republic of Ireland and scored two goals for them from 2001 to 2008. He was part of their squad at the 2002 FIFA World Cup.

== Club career ==
=== Millwall ===
Born in Kingston upon Thames, London, Reid attended St. Agatha's Catholic Primary School and Richard Challoner School in the same outer London area. He started his career at Millwall, and made his professional debut in the 1997–98 season at the age of 17. He was part of the successful 2000–01 team that gained promotion to the English First Division. Reid gained a reputation for his strong, driving runs and phenomenal long range shooting ability, memorably scoring from 35 yards against Norwich City on the opening day of the 2001–02 season to set Millwall on their way to a 4–0 victory.

=== Blackburn Rovers ===
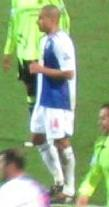
Reid playing for Blackburn Rovers in 2007

On 29 July 2003, Reid signed a four-year contract with Premier League club Blackburn Rovers, for a fee of £2.5 million. He made his debut on 23 August as a 76th-minute substitute for Vratislav Greško, and was sent off in the 88th minute of a 2–2 draw away to Bolton Wanderers. He made 19 appearances through the 2003–04 season, though a hamstring injury would rule him out of action for three months during this time. A change of management in September 2004 saw Mark Hughes replace Graeme Souness as Blackburn boss, a move which would also signify a change for Reid. Despite playing the majority of his career as a wide midfielder, Hughes moved Reid to centre midfield for the match against Everton on 6 March 2005. Reid went on to star in a 1–0 victory for Blackburn, creating the winning goal, and has since claimed the central midfield position.

Reid scored one of the goals of the seasons in the 2005–06 Premier League campaign against Wigan at the JJB Stadium. The ball fell to Reid from 30 yards and he scored a volley into the top corner of the net. The goal won BBC Match of the Day's Goal of the Month for December. On 2 May 2006, Reid scored the goal that secured Blackburn's place in the 2006–07 UEFA Cup, a header that gave them a 1–0 win over Chelsea.

Reid missed the majority of the 2006–07 season through injury. A back injury limited him to three appearances before he sustained cruciate ligament injury in January, which kept him out for the rest of the season.

It appeared that Reid's injury problems were behind him after a full pre-season and solid start to Blackburn's 2008–09 season, however another knee injury ruled him out of the entire 2008–09 season.

On 19 November 2009, Reid signed on loan for Queens Park Rangers (QPR) in an attempt to recapture his career from injury. The loan lasted until midway through December 2009. During which time Reid wore the number 36 shirt.

=== West Bromwich Albion ===
On 5 March 2010, West Bromwich Albion signed Reid on a one-month loan. He made his debut against his previous loan club, Queens Park Rangers, on 6 March 2010, playing at right back in the 3–1 defeat at Loftus Road. He scored his first goal for the club against Coventry City on 24 March 2010. On 26 May 2010, Reid joined West Brom following their promotion to the Premier League on a permanent basis after signing a two-year contract. He officially joined on 1 July 2010 after a medical and had the option of a further 12-month extension on his contract. He scored his first goal for the club after making his move permanent against Leicester City in the League Cup on 26 October 2010.

At the opening season of 2011/12, Reid scored an own goal in a 2–1 loss against Manchester United after Ashley Young cross from the left took a deflection off Reid and beat goalkeeper Ben Foster. As the season progressed, Reid asserted himself as the number one right back and continued into the 2011–12 season, scoring his first goal of the season from a free-kick against Wigan in December 2011. After a match against Chelsea which West Brom won 1–0 on 3 March 2012, Reid missed the rest of the season after injuring ankle ligaments in a match. While recovering ankle ligaments from his injury, Reid signed a new two-year deal that would keep him at West Brom until 2014.

=== Burnley ===
After being released by West Bromwich Albion at the end of the 2013–14 season Reid was initially considering taking up a coaching role at the Hawthorns. However, after being approached by newly promoted Burnley, managed by his former Millwall teammate Sean Dyche he opted to stay on playing and signed a one-year contract at Turf Moor.

On 18 May 2015, with Burnley relegated, Reid announced that he would retire at the end of the season, and enter coaching.

== International career ==
Reid was born in London with Jamaican heritage from his father's side of the family, and Irish heritage from his mother's side, as her father was from Ballinasloe in County Galway. Reid played for the England under-16 team before switching to the Republic of Ireland from under-21 level onwards.

On 15 August 2001, Reid made his debut for the Republic of Ireland in a 2–2 friendly draw with Croatia at Lansdowne Road, in which he was substituted at half time for Steve Finnan. In his next match the following 13 February, he scored a 20-yard volley after three minutes of a 2–0 win over Russia at the same venue.

Reid was a late call-up to the 2002 FIFA World Cup squad due to Mark Kennedy's injury; Reid was driving to the airport to go on holiday to Barbados when he was called up. On 16 May, in a warm-up game, he came on as a half-time substitute for Jason McAteer and scored a consolation goal in a 2–1 loss to Nigeria. At the finals in Japan and South Korea, he made two substitute appearances in group-stage draws with Cameroon and Germany, as the Irish reached the last 16.

Reid played 23 games for the Republic of Ireland and was the captain for their 16 August 2006 friendly match against the Netherlands, a 4–0 loss. He retired from international football on 13 July 2010 in order to concentrate on his club career, and said that October that he could return if Ireland needed cover in the midfield department.

== Coaching career ==
On 25 June 2015, Reid was appointed in the role of first-team coach at Championship club Reading. He left on 27 July 2017, in a bid to pursue new challenges.

That September, he joined Crystal Palace, in the same position that he held at Reading. Reid left the club the following August, with manager Roy Hodgson indicating that Reid had cited personal issues and wished to take time away from football. He then briefly coached at AFC Wimbledon, leaving in December 2018.

On 18 April 2019, he was appointed to assist caretaker manager Jimmy Shan at West Bromwich Albion. He worked for West Brom until the end of the 2018–19 season, before joining Steve Clarke's backroom staff at the Scotland national team in May 2019. Reid left the position with Scotland in August 2021, after becoming a first team coach with Nottingham Forest. On 16 September 2021, Reid was appointed interim manager of the club, following the dismissal of Chris Hughton. Two days later in his only game, he led the club to their first win of the season, 2–0 at Huddersfield Town.

In October 2022, Reid revealed that he had left his job as Nottingham Forest assistant manager in order to begin studying to qualify as a counsellor.

In July 2023, Nottingham Forest announced that Reid had returned to the club, returning to his role as a first team coach. He left again in September 2024.

== Career statistics ==
=== Club ===
Appearances and goals by club, season and competition
Club	Season	League			FA Cup		League Cup		Europe		Other		Total	
Club	Season	Division	Apps	Goals	Apps	Goals	Apps	Goals	Apps	Goals	Apps	Goals	Apps	Goals
Millwall	1997–98	Second Division	1	0	0	0	0	0	—		0	0	1	0
Millwall	1998–99	Second Division	25	0	0	0	1	0	—		6 (Note: Appearance(s) in Football League Trophy)	0	32	0
Millwall	1999–2000	Second Division	21	0	1	0	1	0	—		1	0	24	0
Millwall	2000–01	Second Division	37	7	3	0	4	0	—		2	0	46	7
Millwall	2001–02	First Division	35	5	2	0	1	0	—		2 (Note: Appearances in Football League First Division play-offs)	0	40	5
Millwall	2002–03	First Division	20	6	4	1	0	0	—		—		24	7
Millwall	Total		139	18	10	1	7	0	—		11	0	167	19
Blackburn Rovers	2003–04	Premier League	16	0	0	0	1	0	2 (Note: Appearances in UEFA Cup)	0	—		19	0
Blackburn Rovers	2004–05	Premier League	28	2	6	0	0	0	—		—		34	2
Blackburn Rovers	2005–06	Premier League	34	4	1	0	4	1	—		—		39	5
Blackburn Rovers	2006–07	Premier League	3	0	0	0	0	0	0	0	—		3	0
Blackburn Rovers	2007–08	Premier League	24	0	0	0	1	0	0	0	—		25	0
Blackburn Rovers	2008–09	Premier League	4	0	0	0	0	0	—		—		4	0
Blackburn Rovers	2009–10	Premier League	4	0	1	0	5	1	—		—		10	1
Blackburn Rovers	Total		113	6	8	0	11	2	2	0	—		134	8
Queens Park Rangers (loan)	2009–10	Championship	2	0	0	0	0	0	—		—		2	0
West Bromwich Albion (loan)	2009–10	Championship	10	1	0	0	0	0	—		—		10	1
West Bromwich Albion	2010–11	Premier League	23	1	0	0	4	1	—		—		27	2
West Bromwich Albion	2011–12	Premier League	22	1	0	0	0	0	—		—		22	1
West Bromwich Albion	2012–13	Premier League	11	0	1	0	0	0	—		—		12	0
West Bromwich Albion	2013–14	Premier League	16	0	0	0	1	0	—		—		17	0
West Bromwich Albion	Total		82	3	1	0	5	1	—		—		88	4
Burnley	2014–15	Premier League	7	0	1	0	0	0	—		—		8	0
Career total			343	27	20	1	23	3	2	0	11	0	399	31

=== International ===
Appearances and goals by national team and year
National team	Year	Apps	Goals
Republic of Ireland	2001	1	0
Republic of Ireland	2002	6	2
Republic of Ireland	2003	5	0
Republic of Ireland	2004	1	0
Republic of Ireland	2005	3	0
Republic of Ireland	2006	4	0
Republic of Ireland	2008	3	0
Total		23	2

=== Managerial ===
Managerial record by team and tenure
Team	From	To	Record				
Team	From	To	P	W	D	L	Win %
Nottingham Forest (caretaker)	16 September 2021	21 September 2021	1	1	0	0	100.0
Total			1	1	0	0	100.0

== Honours ==
Millwall

- Football League Second Division: 2000–01
- Football League Trophy runner-up: 1998–99

West Bromwich Albion

- Football League Championship second-place promotion: 2009–10

== See also ==
- List of Republic of Ireland international footballers born outside the Republic of Ireland
