= Paul Robinson (footballer, born 1982) =

English footballer

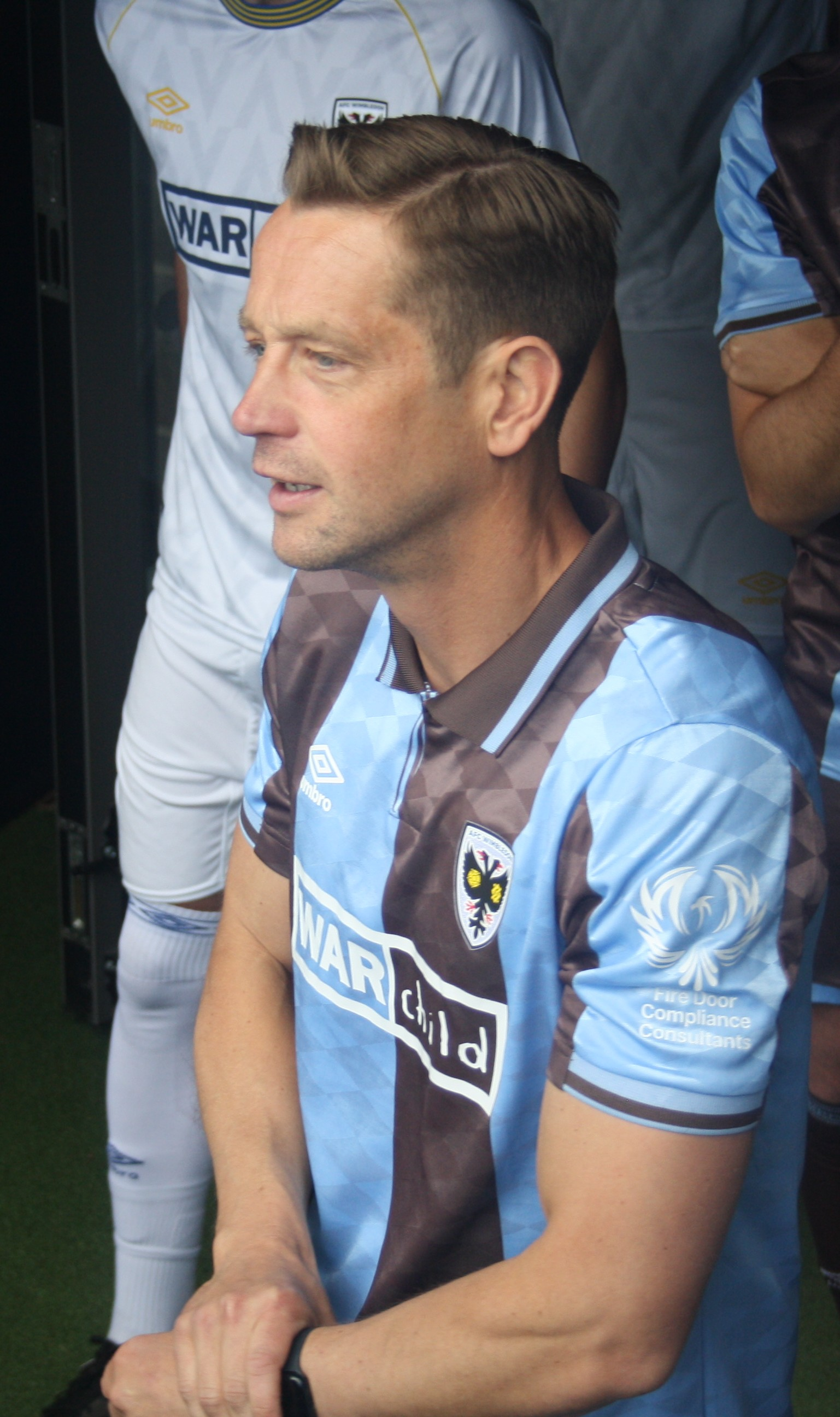
- Robinson in 2025.

Personal information
- Full name: Paul Mark James Robinson
- Date of birth: 7 January 1982 (age 44)
- Place of birth: Barnet, England
- Height: 6 ft 1 in (1.85 m)
- Position: Centre back

Team information
- Current team: Millwall (U23 coach)

Youth career
- ?–2001: Millwall

Senior career*
Years	Team	Apps	(Gls)
2001–2015	Millwall	311	(17)
2001	→ Fisher Athletic (loan)	0	(0)
2004–2005	→ Torquay United (loan)	12	(0)
2014–2015	→ Portsmouth (loan)	20	(1)
2015	Portsmouth	13	(1)
2015–2018	AFC Wimbledon	102	(5)
2018–2019	Havant & Waterlooville	18	(1)
Total		476	(25)
- * Club domestic league appearances and goals

Paul Mark James Robinson (born 7 January 1982) is an English former professional footballer who works as assistant manager for Millwall under 23s in the Championship.

== Playing career ==
=== Millwall ===
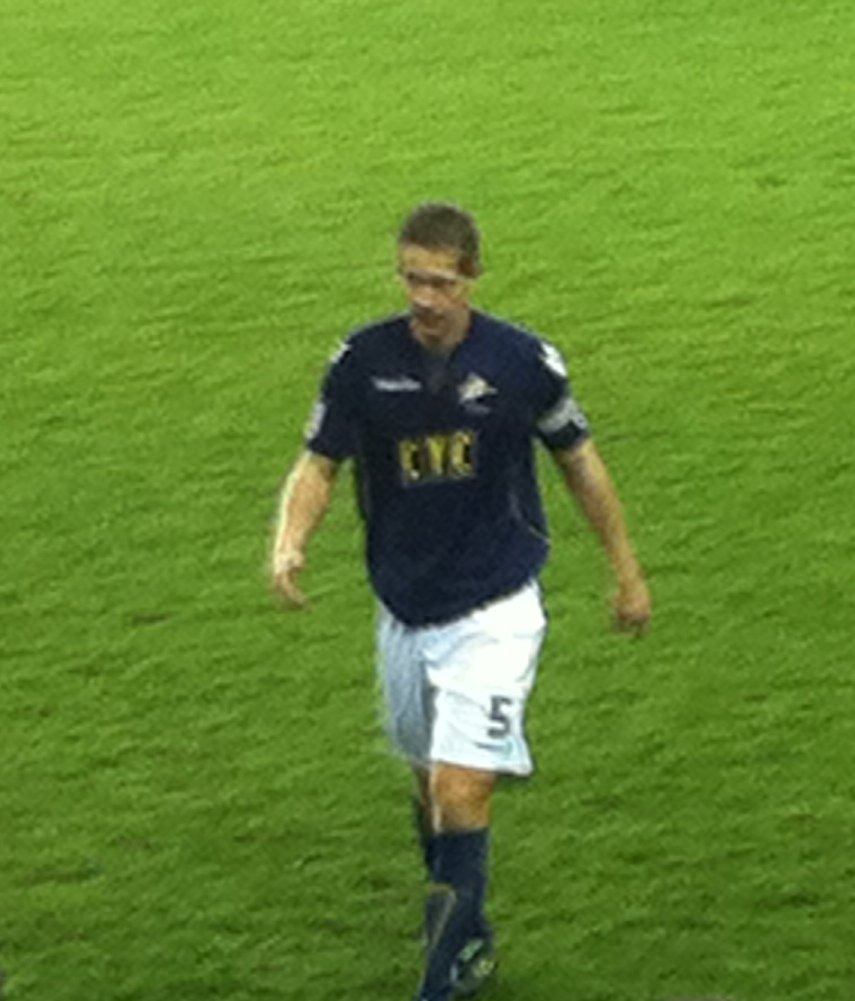
Robinson captaining Millwall in 2010

Born in Barnet, London, Robinson began his career as a trainee with Millwall after being released from Watford, turning professional in August 2001. Later that month he joined Fisher Athletic on loan to gain some first team experience. He made his Millwall debut on 9 September 2002, coming on as a second-half substitute for Darren Ward in a 2–1 home win against Preston North End.

In December 2004 Robinson joined Torquay United on loan, playing twelve times before returning to Millwall and establishing himself as a first team regular, eventually gaining club captaincy under Lions' boss Kenny Jackett and establishing himself as a firm fan favourite. In 2009, he struggled with several injury problems, and missed the start of the 2009–2010 season for Millwall. He came back from injury with a goal against Stockport County.

On 28 January 2010, Robinson extended his contract with Millwall until 2013. He scored the only goal of the 2010 Football League One play-off final against Swindon Town in the 39th minute on 29 May 2010 to guide Millwall to the Football League Championship, also receiving the man of the match award.

After appearing regularly for Millwall in the following campaigns, Robinson signed a new three-year deal on 17 July 2012. However, he appeared in only three matches during the 2012–13 season, due to multiple injuries.

=== Portsmouth ===
On 6 August 2014 Robinson joined Portsmouth in a one-month loan deal. He scored his first goal against Mansfield in a 1–1 home draw. His loan ended when his contract was cancelled by parent club Millwall on 6 January 2015. The next day, Robinson signed an 18-month contract with Portsmouth. His first and second goals for Pompey came against Mansfield and Cambridge United.

Robinson was appointed Portsmouth captain for the forthcoming 2015/16 season, but departed the club on 31 July 2015 by mutual consent.

=== AFC Wimbledon ===
On 3 August 2015, Robinson joined AFC Wimbledon on a one-year deal after a trial. Robinson scored his first goal for the club in a 4–1 win at Cambridge United on 2 January 2016.

He was released by AFC Wimbledon at the end of the 2017–18 season.

=== Havant & Waterlooville ===
On 14 June 2018 Robinson joined semi-professional club Havant & Waterlooville F.C. in their maiden season in the National League.

== Coaching career ==
=== Portsmouth ===
On 28 June 2018 Robinson rejoined Portsmouth as a defensive coach, linking up with former Millwall manager Kenny Jackett.

== Career statistics ==
As of 8 July 2017

Appearances and goals by club, season and competition
Club	Season	League			FA Cup		League Cup		Other		Total	
Club	Season	Division	Apps	Goals	Apps	Goals	Apps	Goals	Apps	Goals	Apps	Goals
Millwall	2002–03	First Division	14	0	4	1	0	0	0	0	18	1
Millwall	2003–04	First Division	9	0	0	0	0	0	0	0	9	0
Millwall	2004–05	Championship	7	1	0	0	0	0	0	0	7	1
Millwall	2005–06	Championship	32	0	2	0	4	1	0	0	38	1
Millwall	2006–07	League One	38	3	4	0	2	0	2 (Note: Appearances in the Football League Trophy)	1	46	4
Millwall	2007–08	League One	45	3	5	0	1	0	1	0	52	3
Millwall	2008–09	League One	26	2	4	0	0	0	3 (Note: One appearance in the Football League Trophy and two in the League One play-offs)	0	33	2
Millwall	2009–10	League One	34	4	5	1	0	0	4 (Note: One appearance in the Football League Trophy and three in the League One play-offs)	2	43	7
Millwall	2010–11	Championship	37	3	1	0	3	0	0	0	41	3
Millwall	2011–12	Championship	41	1	3	0	0	0	0	0	44	1
Millwall	2012–13	Championship	3	0	0	0	0	0	0	0	3	0
Millwall	2013–14	Championship	25	0	0	0	2	0	0	0	27	0
Millwall	Total		311	17	28	2	12	1	10	3	361	23
Torquay United (loan)	2004–05	League One	12	0	0	0	0	0	0	0	12	0
Portsmouth	2014–15	League Two	33	2	2	0	2	0	1	0	38	2
AFC Wimbledon	2015–16	League Two	44	3	1	0	1	0	3 (Note: Three appearances in the League Two play-offs)	0	49	3
AFC Wimbledon	2016–17	League One	43	2	5	1	1	0	0	0	49	3
AFC Wimbledon	Total		87	5	6	1	2	0	3	0	98	6
Havant & Waterlooville	2018–19	National League	17	1	0	0	0	0	0	0	0	0
Career total			443	24	36	3	16	1	14	3	509	31

== Honours ==
Millwall

- Football League One play-offs: 2010

AFC Wimbledon

- Football League Two play-offs: 2016

Individual

- AFC Wimbledon Player of the Year: 2015–16
