= Peter Henry Sweeney =

Scottish footballer (born 1984)

Peter Sweeney
Personal information
- Full name: Peter Henry Sweeney
- Date of birth: 25 September 1984 (age 42)
- Place of birth: Glasgow, Scotland
- Height: 6 ft 0 in (1.83 m)
- Position: Midfielder

Youth career
- –2000: Millwall

Senior career*
Years	Team	Apps	(Gls)
2000–2005	Millwall	59	(5)
2005–2008	Stoke City	35	(2)
2007	→ Yeovil Town (loan)	8	(0)
2007	→ Walsall (loan)	7	(0)
2008–2009	Leeds United	9	(0)
2009	→ Grimsby Town (loan)	8	(0)
2009–2010	Grimsby Town	40	(4)
2010–2013	Bury	82	(5)
2013–2014	AFC Wimbledon	29	(0)
2014–2015	Dartford	36	(1)
2015–2017	Greenwich Borough	43	(2)
Total		356	(19)

International career
2004–2005	Scotland U21	8	(0)
2005	Scotland B	1	(0)

Managerial career
- 2019: Glebe
- * Club domestic league appearances and goals

Peter Henry Sweeney (born 25 September 1984) is a Scottish football manager, coach and former professional player.

Sweeney played as a midfielder and began his career at Millwall where he progressed through their youth team and broke into the first team. He played in the 2004 FA Cup Final were Millwall lost 3–0 to Manchester United. He joined Stoke City in the summer of 2005 for a fee of £250,000 but his start at Stoke was hampered by injuries. He struggled to fully recover and after spending time out on loan at Yeovil Town and Walsall he joined Leeds United in January 2008. After a brief spell at Elland Road Sweeney played for Grimsby Town, Bury, AFC Wimbledon, Dartford and Greenwich Borough.

== Career ==
=== Millwall ===
Sweeney was born in Glasgow and moved with his family to London when he was three-years-old. He started his career at Millwall, where he made his debut in 2002, but he had to wait another year for his breakthrough. Sweeney played 34 times for Millwall in 2003–04 and he played a major role in the Lions' route to the 2004 FA Cup Final, where he started against Manchester United at the Millennium Stadium, Millwall lost 3–0. Following the cup final appearance, Millwall received a place in the UEFA Cup for the 2004–05 season, in which Sweeney played a part in the first round of the tournament, where they were defeated by Hungarian side Ferencvárosi.

=== Stoke City ===
On 1 July 2005 Sweeney signed for Stoke City for a fee of £250,000. His start at Stoke was hampered after he injured his back in a pre-season match against Newcastle Town, which ruled him out for the first three months of the 2005–06. Once he recovered from his injury Sweeney went on to play 20 times scoring once on the final day of the season against Brighton & Hove Albion.

He scored against Luton Town in a 2–2 draw early in the 2006–07 season but soon lost his place in the side and joined Yeovil Town on loan in January 2007. He played eight times for the Golvers before returning to Stoke in April 2007. On 22 November 2007 he signed a two-month loan deal at Walsall where he made seven appearances.

=== Leeds United ===
Early in the January 2008 transfer window Stoke accepted an undisclosed bid for the midfielder from Leeds United, with whom he swiftly agreed personally terms, and it was announced that he would sign, subject to a medical the following week. He finalised the move on 10 January, joining the club on a two–and–a–half–year deal. Despite starting in the last few games of Dennis Wise reign as Leeds manager, including making his debut away to Crewe and providing the assist for Jermaine Beckford's winning header, Sweeney failed to establish himself under managers Gary McAllister and Simon Grayson.

=== Grimsby Town ===
Sweeney made a loan move in March 2009 to Grimsby Town, signing until the end of the season, along with Bradford City forward Barry Conlon and fellow Leeds player Jonathan Lund. Sweeney went on to be part of a Grimsby side that would make a late surge in the league, and that would eventually stave off the threat of relegation from the Football League. Following the close of the 2008–09 season and the end of his loan spell, he was released from his contract at Leeds, following a one-and-a-half-year spell at the West Yorkshire club. On 3 July 2009, after much speculation, Sweeney re–signed for Grimsby on a two–year deal. He scored his first goal for The Mariners against Rotherham United in a 2–1 defeat at home. Sweeney then scored a superb volley against his former club Leeds in the third round of the Football League Trophy at Elland Road: a corner resulted in Leeds keeper Casper Ankergren punching the ball out to Sweeney, who smashed in a left foot volley from the edge of the area that crashed in off the underside of the crossbar; however Grimsby went on to lose the game 3–1. On 18 December, he scored another spectacular goal after hitting a dipping volley from the edge of the box in a 1–1 home draw with Morecambe. Sweeney continued to hold down a position in the centre of midfield throughout the 2009–10 season. On 12 May 2010, he was one of seven players placed on the transfer list by Grimsby manager Neil Woods after their relegation from the Football League.

=== Bury ===
Sweeney joined Bury on 25 June 2010 signing a two–year deal. Despite failing to hold down a regular starting place for "The Shakers" during the 2010–11 season, Sweeney performed consistently when called upon by manager Alan Knill. Following Knill's departure, Sweeney entered the fold under Richie Barker following suspensions and injuries to regular midfield duo Damien Mozika and Steven Schumacher eventually helping the club to earn promotion from League Two. Sweeney made 41 appearances in League One, scoring 4 goals during the 2011–12 season and made 21 appearances, scoring 1 goal, in all competitions during the 2012–13 season for Bury before being sold to AFC Wimbledon on 8 January 2013. During his time at Bury, Sweeney made a total of 95 appearances, which is the most games he has ever played for one club.

=== AFC Wimbledon ===
On 8 January 2013 Sweeney signed for League Two side AFC Wimbledon for a free transfer. After only seven appearances for "The Dons", Sweeney suffered a broken foot in a game against Northampton Town on 19 February 2013 at The Cherry Red Records Stadium. The injury put him out of action for the remainder of the 2012–2013 season. He returned during AFC Wimbledon's 2013–2014 pre–season campaign, scoring in a behind closed doors game against Gillingham on 2 July 2013 that ended 2–1 to "The Gills". Sweeney came on as a substitute for Harry Pell in AFC Wimbledon's next friendly game against Dartford on 6 July 2013 at Princes Park, the game ended 2–2.

=== Dartford ===
In August 2014, he signed for Conference Premier side Dartford on a one-year contract. In May 2015, Sweeney was released by the club following relegation to the National League South and the expiration of his contract.

=== Later career ===
Following his release from Dartford Sweeney joined Greenwich Borough in June 2015.

== Coaching career ==
In October 2017, Sweeney moved to Glebe as to take on the role of assistant manager, working with Anwar Uddin. He was appointed manager in January 2019, but resigned in September the same year.

== Controversies ==
In May 2019, Sweeney's former Grimsby Town teammate Paul Linwood appeared on the 'I Had Trials Once' podcast on Spotify, in the interview he spoke about his time at the club during the 2009–10 season. Linwood went on to explain that the team was "full of alcoholics" and spoke of instances where the drinking culture at the club got out of hand during the season Grimsby Town finished 23rd in League Two and were relegated from the Football League for the first time in their 122-year history.

== Career statistics ==
As of match played 24 May 2015

Appearances and goals by club, season and competition
Club	Season	League			FA Cup		League Cup		Other		Total	
Club	Season	Division	Apps	Goals	Apps	Goals	Apps	Goals	Apps	Goals	Apps	Goals
Millwall	2001–02	First Division	1	0	0	0	0	0	0	0	1	0
Millwall	2002–03	First Division	5	1	1	0	0	0	—		6	1
Millwall	2003–04	First Division	29	2	5	0	0	0	—		34	2
Millwall	2004–05	Championship	24	2	1	0	0	0	1 (Note: Appearance in UEFA Cup)	0	26	2
Millwall	Total		59	5	7	0	0	0	1	0	67	5
Stoke City	2005–06	Championship	17	1	3	0	0	0	—		20	1
Stoke City	2006–07	Championship	13	1	1	0	1	0	—		15	1
Stoke City	2007–08	Championship	5	0	0	0	1	0	—		6	0
Stoke City	Total		35	2	4	0	2	0	—		41	2
Yeovil Town (loan)	2006–07	League One	8	0	0	0	0	0	0	0	8	0
Walsall (loan)	2007–08	League One	7	0	0	0	0	0	0	0	7	0
Leeds United	2007–08	League One	9	0	0	0	0	0	0	0	9	0
Grimsby Town (loan)	2008–09	League Two	8	0	0	0	0	0	0	0	8	0
Grimsby Town	2009–10	League Two	40	4	0	0	1	0	2 (Note: Appearance(s) in Football League Trophy)	2	43	6
Grimsby Town	Total		48	4	0	0	1	0	2	2	51	6
Bury	2010–11	League Two	25	0	1	0	1	0	2	0	29	0
Bury	2011–12	League One	41	4	1	0	2	0	1	0	45	4
Bury	2012–13	League One	16	1	3	0	1	0	1	0	21	1
Bury	Total		82	5	5	0	4	0	4	0	95	5
AFC Wimbledon	2012–13	League Two	7	0	0	0	0	0	0	0	7	0
AFC Wimbledon	2013–14	League Two	22	0	1	0	1	0	1	1	25	1
AFC Wimbledon	Total		29	0	1	0	1	0	1	1	32	1
Dartford	2014–15	Conference Premier	36	1	3	0	—		3 (Note: Appearances in FA Trophy)	0	42	1
Career total			313	17	20	0	8	0	11	3	352	20

== Honours ==
Millwall

- FA Cup runner-up: 2003–04

Stoke City

- Football League Championship runner–up: 2007–08

Bury

- Football League Two runner–up: 2010–11
