= 2004 FA Cup final =

English football match

2004 FA Cup Final
- Event: 2003–04 FA Cup
Manchester United	Millwall
3	0
- Date: 22 May 2004
- Venue: Millennium Stadium, Cardiff
- Man of the Match: Ruud van Nistelrooy (Manchester United)
- Referee: Jeff Winter (North Yorkshire)
- Attendance: 71,350
- Weather: Scattered clouds 13 °C (55 °F); 54% humidity

The 2004 FA Cup final was the 123rd FA Cup Final and the fourth to be played at the Millennium Stadium, the Welsh national stadium in Cardiff, due to the ongoing reconstruction of the usual venue, London's Wembley Stadium. The match took place on 22 May 2004 and it was contested by Manchester United, who had finished third in the Premier League that season, and Millwall, who had finished 10th in the First Division.

Manchester United secured a record 11th FA Cup victory (with a headed goal from Cristiano Ronaldo and a brace from Ruud van Nistelrooy, which included a penalty kick.) In contrast, it was Millwall's first appearance in a final of either the FA Cup or the Football League Cup. At the trophy presentation after the match, the Manchester United players wore shirts bearing the name and number of midfielder Jimmy Davis, who died in a road accident in August 2003. United's victory also marked Sir Alex Ferguson's fifth (and ultimately final) FA Cup win before he retired from management at the end of the 2012-13 season.

The match was refereed by Jeff Winter. Tony Green and Roger East were the assistant referees and Matt Messias was the fourth official.

== Background ==
Manchester United were appearing in their 16th FA Cup final and had won it on 10 of their previous 15 appearances. Two of these victories had yielded a League and FA Cup double (in 1994 and 1996) and in 1999 they had won the FA Cup as part of an unprecedented treble of Premier League, Champions League and FA Cup wins.

For Millwall, 2004 was their first appearance in an FA Cup final, although they had reached the semi-finals on three prior occasions: 1900, 1903 and 1937. Their appearance in the 1937 semi-final was notable as Millwall were the first team in the old Third Division to reach that stage. They also became only the second team from outside the top flight of English football to reach the final since 1982, and the first team from outside the Premier League since its foundation in 1992. Millwall reached the 2004 decider without having met any club from the Premier League along the way.

== Route to the final ==
=== Manchester United ===
Home teams listed first.

Round 3: Aston Villa 1–2 Manchester United

Round 4: Northampton Town 0–3 Manchester United

Round 5: Manchester United 4–2 Manchester City

Round 6: Manchester United 2–1 Fulham

Semi-final: Arsenal 0–1 Manchester United (at Villa Park)

=== Millwall ===
Home teams listed first.

Round 3: Millwall 2–1 Walsall

Round 4: Telford United 0–2 Millwall

Round 5: Millwall 1–0 Burnley

Round 6: Millwall 0–0 Tranmere Rovers

Replay: Tranmere Rovers 1–2 Millwall

Semi-final: Sunderland 0–1 Millwall (at Old Trafford)

== Pre-match ==
=== Venue ===
Due to the ongoing reconstruction of Wembley Stadium, the match was played at the Millennium Stadium in Cardiff for the fourth year in a row. The stadium was built in 1998 ahead of the 1999 Rugby World Cup in Wales, with a capacity of 72,500. While it was being built, the Wales national rugby union team played its home matches at the old Wembley Stadium, so after Wembley was torn down in 2000, the Millennium Stadium was selected to host the finals of the FA Cup, the League Cup and the Football League play-offs until at least 2003. Delays to the construction of the new Wembley meant that deal was later extended until 2006.

=== Referee ===
The referee for the final was Jeff Winter from Middlesbrough, North Yorkshire, who was officiating in his last match as a professional referee, having reached the mandatory retirement age of 45. Winter's assistant referees were Roger East and Tony Green, while Matt Messias was the fourth official.

=== Broadcasting ===
The match was broadcast live on television in the United Kingdom on both BBC One and Sky Sports 1. The BBC broadcast was presented by Gary Lineker, with Alan Hansen, Peter Schmeichel and Michael Owen in the studio, and commentary from John Motson in his 25th FA Cup Final as lead commentator. The BBC also provided live radio coverage on BBC Radio 5 Live, presented by Mark Pougatch, with commentary from Alan Green and Mike Ingham, and analysis from Jimmy Armfield and Steve Claridge.

== Match ==
=== Team selection ===
Manchester United goalkeeper Roy Carroll appeared to have earned his place in the team for the FA Cup final after a run of good performances between the end of March and mid-April 2004, conceding just two goals in five games, including the semi-final win over Arsenal on 3 April. However, a 1–0 defeat away to Portsmouth on 17 April led to a recall for American goalkeeper Tim Howard for the last five games of the season. Although Howard conceded three goals in that time, he retained his place in the team for the cup final. Following the recurrence of a knee injury against Arsenal on 28 March, striker Ruud van Nistelrooy was only able to play in one match in April 2004 and was expected to miss the last two league games against Chelsea and Aston Villa to ensure his fitness for the final; however, he recovered in time to play and score in both games, guaranteeing his place up front against Millwall. One surprise selection saw Darren Fletcher named in central midfield alongside Roy Keane ahead of both Nicky Butt and Phil Neville.

Millwall went into the final with doubts over the fitness of player-manager Dennis Wise (knee), captain Kevin Muscat (knee) and midfielder Paul Ifill (groin); Wise and Ifill recovered in time to play in the final, but Muscat was ruled out for the rest of the season. Bob Peeters, Andy Roberts, Tony Warner and Charley Hearn also missed the game through injury, while striker Danny Dichio was suspended. Because they were unable to play in the game, and with manager Wise in the starting line-up, Muscat and Warner led the Millwall team out for the national anthem before kick-off.

=== Summary ===
The first chances of the match fell to Manchester United's Paul Scholes, who took a couple of long-range efforts at goal – one went just wide while another was tipped away by Millwall goalkeeper Andy Marshall. Scholes was presented with another opportunity on the six-yard line, when a rabona cross from Cristiano Ronaldo found him unmarked; the midfielder seemed as surprised by the cross as everyone else and completely missed the ball with his hooked shot.

Millwall's only chance of the first half came when Paul Ifill broke down the right-hand side of the pitch and arrowed in towards the penalty area, only to have his shot blocked. They looked to have survived the first half without conceding until a minute before the interval, when Roy Keane played in Gary Neville as the right-back moved into the penalty area and Neville chipped a cross back across the box; Millwall player-manager Dennis Wise waited for the ball to arrive, but in doing so, he allowed Ronaldo to steal in and head the ball past Marshall, to give United a 1–0 lead going into the break.

Manchester United went 2–0 up 20 minutes into the second half, when Ryan Giggs went on a run down the right wing into the Millwall box only to be brought down by David Livermore. Referee Jeff Winter awarded a penalty for the foul and Ruud van Nistelrooy scored with a powerful shot into the top-corner to the goalkeeper's right. United now held a comfortable advantage and Millwall struggled to find a way back into the match. United's defence kept Neil Harris and Tim Cahill at bay, and the Red Devils eventually scored a third when Giggs went on a run down the left and crossed for Van Nistelrooy to tap in from three yards out. There were suggestions that Van Nistelrooy was offside at the moment of Giggs' pass, but television replays showed his feet were grounded in an onside position.

Millwall had a chance near the end when substitute Mark McCammon almost found a way through United's defence, while Scholes had a late effort for the Reds, before Curtis Weston (aged 17 years and 119 days) replaced Wise to become the youngest player to appear in an FA Cup final, beating the record set by James F. M. Prinsep of Clapham Rovers, when he appeared in the 1879 FA Cup Final at the age of 17 years and 245 days. The match finished 3–0 to Manchester United, their 11th success in the FA Cup.

=== Match details ===
22 May 2004
15:00 BST

Manchester United	3–0	Millwall
Ronaldo 44'; Van Nistelrooy 65' (pen.), 81'	Report

Millennium Stadium, Cardiff
Attendance: 71,350
Referee: Jeff Winter (North Yorkshire)

Manchester United	Millwall

GK	14	(United States) Tim Howard	(substituted off) 84'
RB	2	(England) Gary Neville
CB	6	(England) Wes Brown
CB	27	(France) Mikaël Silvestre
LB	22	(Republic of Ireland) John O'Shea
RM	7	(Portugal) Cristiano Ronaldo	(substituted off) 84'
CM	24	(Scotland) Darren Fletcher	(substituted off) 84'
CM	16	(Republic of Ireland) Roy Keane (c)
LM	11	(Wales) Ryan Giggs
SS	18	(England) Paul Scholes
CF	10	(Netherlands) Ruud van Nistelrooy
Substitutes:
GK	13	(Northern Ireland) Roy Carroll	(substituted on) 84'
DF	3	(England) Phil Neville
MF	8	(England) Nicky Butt	(substituted on) 84'
MF	19	(Cameroon) Eric Djemba-Djemba
FW	20	(Norway) Ole Gunnar Solskjær	(substituted on) 84'
Manager:
(Scotland) Alex Ferguson

GK	33	(England) Andy Marshall
RB	25	(England) Marvin Elliott
CB	2	(England) Matt Lawrence (c)
CB	12	(England) Darren Ward
LB	3	(Republic of Ireland) Robbie Ryan		(substituted off) 74'
RM	7	(England) Paul Ifill
CM	19	(England) Dennis Wise	(yellow card) 48'	(substituted off) 89'
CM	8	(England) David Livermore
LM	26	(Scotland) Peter Sweeney
SS	4	(Australia) Tim Cahill
CF	9	(England) Neil Harris		(substituted off) 75'
Substitutes:
GK	13	(France) Willy Guéret
DF	27	(Republic of Ireland) Alan Dunne
MF	37	(Republic of Ireland) Barry Cogan		(substituted on) 74'
MF	11	(England) Curtis Weston		(substituted on) 89'
FW	23	(England) Mark McCammon		(substituted on) 75'
Player-manager:
(England) Dennis Wise

Man of the Match

- Ruud van Nistelrooy (Manchester United)

Match officials

- Assistant referees:
  - Roger East (Wiltshire)
  - Tony Green (Leicestershire and Rutland)
- Fourth official: Matt Messias (Sheffield & Hallamshire)

Match rules

- 90 minutes
- 30 minutes of extra-time if necessary
- Penalty shoot-out if scores still level
- Five named substitutes, of which three could be used

== Post-match ==
Manchester United were presented with the FA Cup by England manager Sven-Göran Eriksson, who selected Ruud van Nistelrooy as the man of the match. For the trophy presentation, the Manchester United squad changed into shirts bearing the name and squad number of Jimmy Davis, who died in a road accident while on loan to Watford in August 2003. Eriksson's selection of Van Nistelrooy as man of the match was met with criticism from some members of the media, with both the BBC and The Guardian naming Cristiano Ronaldo as the game's best player. Ronaldo received praise from both his manager Alex Ferguson and teammate Gary Neville after the game, as well as BBC pundit Alan Hansen and The Guardian's Andy Gray.

Dennis Wise claimed Ronaldo's goal at the end of the first half proved the turning point in the match, but he felt there were plenty of positives for his team to take from the game. It was Tim Cahill's last game for Millwall, as he signed for Everton in July 2004, and Nicky Butt's last game for Manchester United, as he signed for Newcastle United later that same month.

Since Manchester United had already qualified for the 2004–05 UEFA Champions League by virtue of their league position, Millwall qualified for the first round of the 2004–05 UEFA Cup. Club owner Theo Paphitis said the club had made around £2.5 million for making it to the FA Cup final, but that the club could stand to lose money if they failed to reach the group stage of the UEFA Cup.

It was the last time that Manchester United won the FA Cup until 2016.
