= Baltacı =

The Baltacı corps was a palace guard of the Ottoman Empire.

Baltacı may also refer to:

== People ==
- Baltacı Mehmet Pasha (1662–1712), Ottoman Grand Vizier (1704–1706, 1710–1711)
- Baltacı Süleyman Pasha, a wali of Damascus (1706–1707) and Beylerbey of Egypt (1704)
- Ali Taner Baltacı (born 1977), Turkish filmmaker
- Ecem Baltacı (born 1940), Turkish actress
- Mehmet Baltacı (1944–2007) Turkish photographer
- Metehan Baltacı (born 2002), Turkish footballer
- Necabettin Baltacı, birth name of Necabettin Ergenekon (1926–2020), Turkish army officer
- Nevin Yanıt Baltacı (born 1986), Turkish hurdler
- Özkan Baltacı (born 13 February 1994), Turkish hammer thrower

== Places ==
- Baltacı, Cide, a village in the district of Cide, Kastamonu Province, Turkey
- Baltacı, Dicle, a village in the district of Dicle, Diyarbakır Province, Turkey
- Baltacı, Kastamonu, a village in the district of Kastamonu, Kastamonu Province, Turkey
- Baltacı Mehmet Paşa, Osmancık, a village in the district of Osmancık, Çorum Province, Turkey
- Baltacı Stream, Trabzon Province, Turkey (a.k.a. Baltacı River, Baltacı Creek, Yeniköy Stream)
