= Moses Ashikodi =

Antigua and Barbuda international footballer (born 1987)

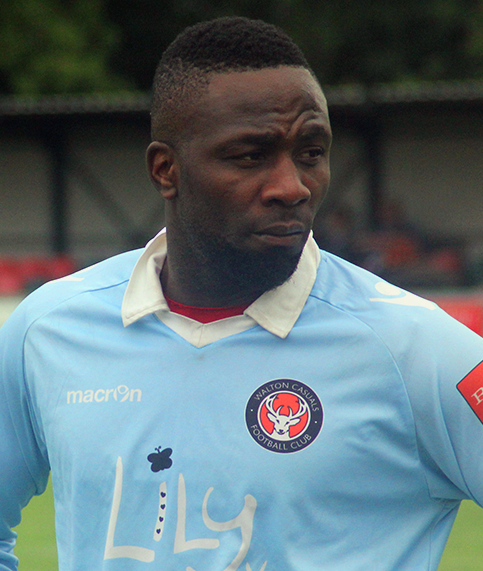
- Ashikodi playing for Walton Casuals in 2015

Personal information
- Full name: Moses Ashikodi
- Date of birth: 27 June 1987 (age 39)
- Place of birth: Lagos, Nigeria
- Height: 6 ft 0 in (1.83 m)
- Position: Striker

Youth career
- ?–2003: Millwall

Senior career*
Years	Team	Apps	(Gls)
2003–2004	Millwall	5	(0)
2004–2006	West Ham United	0	(0)
2005	→ Gillingham (loan)	4	(0)
2006–2007	Rangers	1	(0)
2007–2009	Watford	2	(0)
2007	→ Bradford City (loan)	8	(2)
2008	→ Swindon Town (loan)	10	(0)
2008–2009	→ Hereford United (loan)	6	(0)
2009	Shrewsbury Town	8	(1)
2009–2010	Kettering Town	14	(6)
2010	Ebbsfleet United	15	(10)
2010–2012	Kettering Town	23	(7)
2011–2012	→ York City (loan)	5	(1)
2012	York City	3	(0)
2012–2013	Ebbsfleet United	23	(2)
2013	Enfield Town	0	(0)
2013	Margate	5	(0)
2013–14	Farnborough	2	(0)
2014	Cray Wanderers	10	(5)
2014	AFC Hornchurch	5	(0)
2014	Eastbourne Borough	4	(0)
2014–2015	Maldon & Tiptree	3	(1)
2015	Cray Wanderers	11	(7)
2015	Walton Casuals	15	(7)
2015	Walton & Hersham	1	(0)
2015–2016	Carshalton Athletic	3	(1)
2016	Croydon	2	(2)
2016	East Grinstead Town	1	(1)
2016	Croydon	1	(0)
2016	Whyteleafe	5	(1)
2016	Guildford City	4	(1)
2016	Chatham Town	2	(0)
2017	Walton Casuals	6	(1)
2017	Three Bridges	4	(0)
2017–2018	Rochester United	9	(6)
2018	VCD Athletic	1	(0)
2018	South Park	2	(0)
2018	VCD Athletic	2	(0)
Total		200	(61)

International career^{‡}
2002	England U16	8	(3)
2002–2003	England U17	5	(1)
2005	England U18	1	(0)
2005–2006	England U19	3	(3)
2012	Antigua and Barbuda	2	(0)
- * Club domestic league appearances and goals as of 18 November 2018 ‡ National team caps and goals as of 25 March 2017

Moses Ashikodi (born 27 June 1987) is a retired professional footballer.

Having started his career at Millwall, he has also played professionally for West Ham United, Gillingham, Rangers, Watford, Bradford City, Swindon Town, Hereford United and Shrewsbury Town.

Ashikodi has played semi-professional football for Ebbsfleet United, Kettering Town, York City, Enfield Town, Margate, Farnborough, Cray Wanderers, AFC Hornchurch, Eastbourne Borough, Maldon & Tiptree, Walton Casuals, Walton & Hersham, Carshalton Athletic, Croydon, East Grinstead Town, Whyteleafe, Guildford City, Chatham Town, Three Bridges, Rochester United, VCD Athletic and South Park.

He has been capped twice for Antigua & Barbuda, having represented England at Under-16, under-17, under-18 and under-19 levels.

== Club career ==
=== Millwall ===
Ashikodi began his career in the Millwall youth system. On 22 February 2003, he made his professional debut as a substitute in a 1–0 defeat at Brighton & Hove Albion. In doing so, at 15 years and 240 days, he became the youngest player to make a first team appearance for Millwall and the youngest player to make his Football League debut between 1988 and 2008.

He made a further four substitute appearances during the 2002–03 season, and was chosen by the club's youth academy staff as Millwall's Schoolboy of the Year award for a second successive season.

Ashikodi's career at Millwall effectively ended in February 2004 after a training ground incident that reportedly saw him threaten teammate Mark McCammon with a plastic knife. The club launched an investigation into the events, and on 29 April he left the club by mutual consent. A club statement read: "The disciplinary process has been concluded. We wish him the best of luck in his future career."

=== West Ham United ===
On 5 August 2004, Ashikodi joined Championship club West Ham United on a two-year contract after impressing during a trial. Manager Alan Pardew said: "Moses is getting a last chance with us. He is a major talent and, hopefully, he will have learned his lesson."

He failed to make a first team appearance and was released at the end of the 2005–06 season.

==== Gillingham (loan) ====
In August 2005, Ashikodi joined League One side Gillingham on a four-month loan. On 20 August, he made his debut in a 1–0 victory against AFC Bournemouth. The match proved to be his only victory during the loan spell, featuring in two defeats and a draw. His final appearance came on 15 October in a goalless draw with Yeovil Town. Replacing Andy Hessenthaler at half-time, Ashikodi picked up two yellow cards and was dismissed within 29 minutes. He made a total of four substitute appearances before returning to his parent club.

=== Rangers ===
Ashikodi joined Scottish Premier League club Rangers in January 2006 after a successful trial period. He signed a contract until the end of the 2005–06 season.

Upon signing for the club, he said: "I know that I did not have the best of times at my previous clubs but this is now behind me and all I want to do now is give 110% for Rangers. It is a fresh start and I am really looking forward to playing in Scotland and scoring goals again".

On 23 April, he made his only appearance for the first team as a late substitute away to Celtic.

=== Watford ===
On 1 January 2007, Ashikodi completed a move to Premier League club Watford after impressing during a two-week trial. He signed a two-and-a-half-year contract for a nominal fee. On 6 January, he scored the final goal in a 4–1 FA Cup win over Stockport County on his debut. The goal was his first at senior level. He played his first Premier League game against Aston Villa on 20 January.

Ashikodi's contract was terminated in February 2009. Later that month he played on trial for both Luton Town, scoring in the side's reserve team game against Peterborough United, and Shrewsbury Town, where he scored twice in a reserve fixture.

==== Bradford City (loan) ====
In March 2007, Ashikodi joined League One side Bradford City on a one-month loan. The loan was extended until the end of the season two weeks later, and he scored twice in eight games for the club. His loan spell was cut short after he sustained a broken leg in a fixture against Brighton & Hove Albion, which ruled him out for the remainder of the season.

==== Swindon Town (loan) ====
After recovering from his broken leg, Ashikodi was loaned out to League One side Swindon Town in January 2008. Expected to remain at the club for the rest of the season, he made 10 appearances before being forced to return to Watford in early April after a loose screw on a plate in his leg required surgery ruled him out of the remainder of the season.

==== Hereford United (loan) ====
In August 2008, Ashikodi joined League One side Hereford United on a five-month loan. He scored in his second game for the club, a 2–1 loss to Championship side Crystal Palace in the League Cup on 12 August. In mid-September he returned to Watford for treatment on an injury, but subsequently returned to Hereford to complete the loan period. Ashikodi made eight appearances for Hereford, with one goal scored, and returned to his parent club in January 2009.

=== Shrewsbury Town ===
In February 2009, Ashikodi joined League Two club Shrewsbury Town after a successful trial. On 28 February, he made his debut in a 3–0 defeat at Macclesfield Town Ashikodi scored his first goal for the club a week later in his third game to help Shrewsbury to a 3–2 win against Notts County on 7 March. He came on as an 89th-minute substitute in a 1–0 defeat to Gillingham in the 2009 Football League Two play-off final at Wembley Stadium on 23 May. Two days later, he was released by Shrewsbury having scored 1 goal in 10 games.

=== Kettering Town ===
On 2 September 2009, Ashikodi joined Conference Premier side Kettering Town. He made his debut as a second-half substitute against Altrincham three days later, scoring once and setting up a second goal in a 2–0 victory. Ashikodi played his final game in a 1–1 FA Cup Second Round draw at home to Leeds United on 29 November. He was later released by the club.

=== Ebbsfleet United ===
On 19 January 2010, Ashikodi remained in the Conference Premier after signing with Ebbsfleet United. That same day, he scored a penalty on his debut against former club Kettering Town. He scored 10 goals in 15 league appearances before his departure at the end of the season.

=== Kettering Town ===
In July 2010, Ashikodi returned to Conference Premier side Kettering Town.

On 27 September 2011, he was sent off in a 5–3 loss to Hayes & Yeading United, along with teammate Jean-Paul Marna. The pair were dismissed for fighting following a dispute over who should take a penalty. Ashikodi eventually took the penalty, and after missing Marna scored from the resulting corner. They then came to blows on their way back to the centre circle.

Manager Mark Stimson said of the incident: "I couldn't believe what I was seeing and I don't want to experience it again. We're not saying they won't ever play for the club again, but we're saying if they are fortunate enough to, 'don't do something twice.'"

In November 2011, Ashikodi was placed on a transfer list due to the club's financial difficulties – which saw the complete first team squad listed for sale.

==== York City (loan) ====
On 23 November 2011, Ashikodi joined Conference Premier club York City on loan until the New Year. On 3 December, he scored his first goal against parent club Kettering Town in a 7–0 victory. The goal proved to be his only in six appearances in the loan spell.

=== York City ===
On 2 January 2012, after the expiration of his loan deal with York City, Ashikodi signed a permanent contract that would take him up to the end of the season. He failed to score again for the club, managing just three starts, and was released in May 2012.

=== Ebbsfleet United ===
Ashikodi re-signed for Conference Premier side Ebbsfleet United in July 2012. Having scored five goals in pre-season, Ashikodi also scored on the opening day of the season in a thrilling 5–4 victory at Nuneaton Town. Scoring in a 4–2 defeat at Hereford United on 25 August, he then went almost two months without finding the net.

On 22 October, having returned from international duty just two days earlier, Ashikodi struck in the 87th minute to seal a 1–0 win against Woking in the FA Cup Fourth Qualifying Round. The goal ensured a first win in eight games, and Ashikodi later revealed he was still suffering from jet lag.

He failed to score again for the club and departed after three goals in 26 appearances. Ashikodi had an unsuccessful trial with Luton Town after his release in May 2013.

=== Enfield Town ===
On 2 November 2013, Ashikodi signed for Isthmian League Premier Division team Enfield Town. The same day he made his debut in an FA Trophy Second Qualifying Round defeat to Grays Athletic. On 12 November, he made his league debut in a 3–0 loss to Wingate & Finchley. The defeat saw manager Steve Newing sacked and Ashikodi failed to appear for the club again.

=== Margate ===
Exactly a month after signing for Enfield Town, Ashikodi joined Isthmian League Premier Division club Margate. The striker had looked set to join Hampton & Richmond Borough but the club announced the deal fell apart in the final stages. On 7 December, he started in a 5–3 defeat to Bognor Regis Town. After three games without a goal and a change in managers, Ashikodi was dropped to the bench for a 2–2 draw with Hampton & Richmond Borough on 21 December. Coming off the bench in a 4–0 loss at Maidstone United on 26 December, and being unused two days later, Ashikodi departed the club soon after without a first win.

=== Farnborough ===
On 31 December 2013, Conference South side Farnborough announced that Ashikodi had signed a short-team deal with the club. On 11 January 2014, he made his debut in a 2–1 defeat to Staines Town. He made a further two appearances for the club, with one in the Hampshire Senior Cup.

=== Cray Wanderers ===
In February 2014, Ashikodi signed for Isthmian League Premier Division side Cray Wanderers. On 23 February, he scored on his debut in a 5–1 defeat against Lewes. On 1 March, he scored in a 7–1 loss at Metropolitan Police. Ashikodi scored his side's first goal in a 2–2 draw with Wingate & Finchley on 23 March, and scored a brace two days later in a 3–2 win against Grays Athletic.

On 29 March, Ashikodi was accused of biting an opposing player in a league fixture at Billericay Town. The referee did not see the incident so no action was taken during the match, although the official was shown the bite mark on Geoff Mitchell's finger. The incident was later investigated by the FA.

=== AFC Hornchurch ===
Ashikodi joined Isthmian League Premier Division club AFC Hornchurch ahead of the 2014–15 season. On 9 August 2014, Ashikodi made his debut as a substitute in a 1–0 defeat at East Thurrock United. He made a further six appearances for the club, completing ninety minutes on just one occasion, and recorded a single point in seven league outings.

=== Eastbourne Borough ===
In November 2014, Ashikodi joined Conference South side Eastbourne Borough. He made his debut from the bench in a 2–1 win against Hayes & Yeading United on 18 November. He made a further two appearances as a substitute before his departure.

=== Maldon & Tiptree ===
In December 2014, Isthmian League Division One North club Maldon & Tiptree announced the signing of Ashikodi. He made his debut in a 2–0 win against Thamesmead Town on 20 December, and scored his first goal in a 1–1 draw with Burnham Ramblers on 1 January 2015. Ashikodi was named as an unused substitute in the following game and left the club shortly after.

=== Cray Wanderers ===
In January 2015, Ashikodi returned to Isthmian League Division One North side Cray Wanderers. On 24 January, he scored 29 minutes into his debut in a 3–2 defeat to Brentwood Town. A week later, he scored again in a 3–2 defeat at Aveley. After three goalless games, Ashikodi was dropped to the bench in late February. He returned to the starting line-up a month later and scored eight minutes into a 4–0 win against Burnham Ramblers. However, he would not feature again as Cray Wanderers narrowly avoided relegation.

=== Walton Casuals ===
In August 2015, Ashikodi joined Isthmian League Division One South club Walton Casuals for his first time in the eighth tier of English football. On 15 August, he marked his debut with a goal in a 3–0 win against Tooting & Mitcham United. Four days later, he scored again in a 4–0 win over East Grinstead Town in the Isthmian League Cup First Round. On 25 August, he scored both goals in a 3–2 defeat to Walton & Hersham. Ashikodi scored his first goal for the club in a 3–1 win against Three Bridges on 26 September, and played his final game two weeks later. He totalled seven goals in 15 games prior to his release.

=== Walton & Hersham ===
In October 2015, he joined local and league rivals Walton & Hersham. Ashikodi made his debut in a 2–0 defeat at Hastings United, but managed just 51 minutes before being replaced due to an injury. It went on to be his only appearance for the club.

=== Carshalton Athletic ===
In December 2015, Ashikodi joined league rivals Carshalton Athletic after a short absence from football. On 2 January 2016, he made his debut in a 1–1 draw with Corinthian-Casuals. Spending a month with the club, he scored his first goal in his fourth appearance – his side's only goal in a 7–1 loss to Ramsgate. He left the club shortly after the defeat.

=== Croydon ===
In February 2016, Ashikodi made two appearances for Southern Counties East League Premier side Croydon, his first club in the ninth tier. However, his swift departure less than a week after signing ensured he failed to score for the club.

=== East Grinstead Town ===
On 3 March 2016, Isthmian League Division One South club East Grinstead Town announced the signing of Ashikodi. His fifth club of the season, he made his mark with a goal just five minutes into his debut. Nonetheless, it would be his only appearance for the club before his return to a former side.

=== Croydon ===
Later that month, Ashikodi returned to Croydon in the Southern Counties East Premier Division. On 12 March, he made his debut in a 2–1 loss to Lordswood and was substituted after 65 minutes. The defeat proved to be his only appearance as he failed to return to the club.

=== Whyteleafe ===
Ashikodi began the 2016–17 season with Isthmian League Division One South club Whyteleafe. His spell with the club was short-lived, scoring once in five appearances. His final game saw him start on the bench, replacing Roscoe Dsane on the hour, and receiving a yellow card for an intentional handball. Ashikodi stated his intention to leave the club immediately after the game, unhappy at being left on the bench.

=== Guildford City ===
In October 2016, Ashikodi joined Combined Counties Premier Division side Guildford City. He scored on his debut in a 3–1 victory at Knaphill but made just four appearances before his release two weeks later.

=== Chatham Town ===
Ashikodi returned to the Isthmian League in November 2016 with a move to Chatham Town. He made just four appearances for the club before an on-the-pitch incident resulted in his release. An argument with teammate Ricky Freeman led to the striker storming off the pitch, having come on just seven minutes earlier, and leaving his team with 10 men for the final 15 minutes having made all three substitutions.

=== Walton Casuals ===
In March 2017, Ashikodi returned to Isthmian League Division One South club Walton Casuals for his second spell with the club. He made his debut in a 1–0 defeat at Dorking Wanderers on 25 March, and scored a week later in a 3–3 draw against Ramsgate. Ashikodi also scored in a 1–1 draw at Hastings United on 15 April. He made a total of six appearances before leaving the club at the end of the season.

=== Three Bridges ===
Ahead of the 2017–18 season, Ashikodi joined Southern Combination Premier Division side Three Bridges. On 26 August, he made his debut as a substitute in a 1–1 draw with Eastbourne Town and was involved in an incident after the full-time whistle. Involved in a row over a stolen mobile phone, Ashikodi was grabbed around the neck by a supporter leading him to punch the supporter. The club claimed the striker has acting in self defence. He made a further four appearances for the club.

=== Rochester United ===
On 15 November 2017, Ashikodi made his debut for Southern Counties East Premier Division side Rochester United. Three days later, he scored his first goal for the club in a 5–2 defeat against Glebe. He also scored back-to-back goals with a brace at AFC Croydon Athletic and a late consolation goal against Rusthall. The following month, Ashikodi scored in further back-to-back appearances against Glebe and Hollands & Blair. His 82nd-minute strike in the latter earned Ashikodi his first win in eight games, but he made just one further appearance in a 3–1 defeat at Lordswood on 6 January 2018.

=== VCD Athletic ===
Ashikodi started the 2018–19 season on the books of Isthmian League South East Division club VCD Athletic. After only one league appearance, he moved to South Park of the South Central Division, before being brought back to VCD Athletic on 12 October 2018. He retired at the end of that season.

== International career ==
Ashikodi was initially eligible to represent Nigeria, England or Antigua & Barbuda at international level.

He represented England at youth level, and in May 2002 made his debut for the under-16's in a 3–1 friendly victory against Belgium. He scored England's second goal in the 29th minute.

Ashikodi played in the 2002 Victory Shield, scoring in a 1–0 victory against Wales on 1 November, and made his final appearance for the Under-16s in a 2–2 draw with Germany in November. He scored three goals in eight caps before joining the under-17's, making his debut in a 4–0 victory against the Faroe Islands in the 2002 Nordic Tournament. He scored his first goal for the Under-17s almost a year later, netting the winning goal in a 1–0 victory over the United States on 7 July 2003. He made five appearances for England at Under-17 level, scoring one goal.

On 10 June 2005, Ashikodi made a single appearance for the under-18's as a substitute in a 0–0 home draw with Norway. He made his debut for the under-19's in November and scored both goals in a 2–1 victory against Switzerland. Ashikodi made his final appearance in a 2–1 victory over Northern Ireland on 20 May 2006, having scored three goals in three games for the Under-19s.

He made his international debut for Antigua and Barbuda as an 81st-minute substitute in a 3–1 2014 FIFA World Cup qualification defeat to Guatemala on 7 September 2012.

== Personal life ==
Ashikodi was born in Lagos, Nigeria and moved to London. After leaving professional football, Ashikodi began working as a wellbeing personal trainer in Twickenham.

He has resented his "bad boy" jibes after the knife incident that lead to his departure from Millwall. Speaking to the York Press in 2011, he said:

"People mistake me for something I'm not because of one incident when I was 15. That was a very long time ago and I've never been in trouble like that since. I've had a few arguments with players but no big issues. People don't know what happened back then at Millwall but don't seem to want to let it go. They should ask me if they want to find out the truth. I was being bullied at the time and it did not damage my career because I went on to join West Ham."

== Career statistics ==
=== Club ===
As of 1 April 2018

Club statistics
Club	Season	League			FA Cup		League Cup		Other		Total	
Club	Season	Division	Apps	Goals	Apps	Goals	Apps	Goals	Apps	Goals	Apps	Goals
Millwall	2002–03	First Division	5	0	0	0	0	0	0	0	5	0
Millwall	2003–04	First Division	0	0	0	0	0	0	0	0	0	0
Millwall	Total		5	0	0	0	0	0	0	0	5	0
West Ham United	2004–05	Championship	0	0	0	0	0	0	0	0	0	0
West Ham United	2005–06	Premier League	0	0	0	0	0	0	0	0	0	0
West Ham United	Total		0	0	0	0	0	0	0	0	0	0
Gillingham (loan)	2005–06	League One	4	0	0	0	0	0	0	0	4	0
Rangers	2005–06	Scottish Premier League	1	0	0	0	0	0	0	0	1	0
Rangers	2006–07	Scottish Premier League	0	0	0	0	0	0	0	0	0	0
Rangers	Total		1	0	0	0	0	0	0	0	1	0
Watford	2006–07	Premier League	2	0	1	1	0	0	0	0	3	1
Watford	2007–08	Championship	0	0	0	0	0	0	0	0	0	0
Watford	2008–09	Championship	0	0	0	0	0	0	0	0	0	0
Watford	Total		2	0	1	1	0	0	0	0	3	1
Bradford City (loan)	2006–07	League One	8	2	0	0	0	0	0	0	8	2
Swindon Town (loan)	2007–08	League One	10	0	0	0	0	0	0	0	10	0
Hereford United (loan)	2008–09	League One	6	0	0	0	1	1	1 (Note: Appearance in Football League Trophy)	0	8	1
Shrewsbury Town	2008–09	League Two	8	1	0	0	0	0	2 (Note: Appearances in League Two play-offs)	0	10	1
Kettering Town	2009–10	Conference Premier	14	6	4	2	0	0	0	0	18	8
Ebbsfleet United	2009–10	Conference Premier	15	10	0	0	0	0	0	0	15	10
Kettering Town	2010–11	Conference Premier	6	1	0	0	0	0	0	0	6	1
Kettering Town	2011–12	Conference Premier	17	6	2	0	0	0	0	0	19	6
Kettering Town	Total		23	7	2	0	0	0	0	0	25	7
York City (loan)	2011–12	Conference Premier	5	1	0	0	0	0	1 (Note: One appearance in the FA Trophy.)	0	6	1
York City	2011–12	Conference Premier	3	0	0	0	0	0	2 (Note: Two appearances in the FA Trophy.)	0	5	0
Ebbsfleet United	2012–13	Conference Premier	23	2	2	1	0	0	1 (Note: One appearance in the Kent Senior Cup.)	0	26	3
Enfield Town	2013–14	Isthmian League Premier Division	1	0	0	0	0	0	1 (Note: One appearance in the FA Trophy.)	0	2	0
Margate	2013–14	Isthmian League Premier Division	4	0	0	0	0	0	0	0	4	0
Farnborough	2013–14	Conference South	2	0	0	0	0	0	1 (Note: One appearance in the Hampshire Senior Cup.)	0	3	0
Cray Wanderers	2013–14	Isthmian League Premier Division	10	5	0	0	0	0	0	0	10	5
AFC Hornchurch	2014–15	Isthmian League Premier Division	7	0	0	0	0	0	0	0	7	0
Eastbourne Borough	2014–15	Conference South	4	0	0	0	0	0	2 (Note: One appearance in the FA Trophy, one appearance and one goal in Sussex Senior Challenge Cup.)	1	6	1
Maldon & Tiptree	2014–15	Isthmian League Division One North	3	1	0	0	0	0	0	0	3	1
Cray Wanderers	2014–15	Isthmian League Division One North	10	3	0	0	0	0	0	0	10	3
Walton Casuals	2015–16	Isthmian League Division One South	11	6	1	0	2	1	1 (Note: One appearance in the FA Trophy.)	0	15	7
Walton & Hersham	2015–16	Isthmian League Division One South	1	0	0	0	0	0	0	0	1	0
Carshalton Athletic	2015–16	Isthmian League Division One South	4	1	0	0	0	0	0	0	4	1
Croydon	2015–16	Southern Counties East Premier Division	2	0	0	0	0	0	0	0	2	0
East Grinstead Town	2015–16	Isthmian League Division One South	1	1	0	0	0	0	0	0	1	1
Croydon	2015–16	Southern Counties East Premier Division	1	0	0	0	0	0	0	0	1	0
Whyteleafe	2016–17	Isthmian League Division One South	5	1	0	0	0	0	0	0	5	1
Guildford City	2016–17	Combined Counties Premier Division	4	1	0	0	0	0	0	0	4	1
Chatham Town	2016–17	Isthmian League Division One South	4	0	0	0	0	0	0	0	4	0
Walton Casuals	2016–17	Isthmian League Division One South	6	2	0	0	0	0	0	0	6	2
Three Bridges	2017–18	Southern Combination Premier Division	4	0	0	0	0	0	1 (Note: One appearance in the FA Vase.)	0	5	0
Rochester United	2017–18	Southern Counties East Premier Division	9	6	0	0	0	0	0	0	9	6
Career total			145	34	10	4	1	1	8	1	164	40

=== International ===
As of match played 11 September 2012.

National team	Year	Apps	Goals
Antigua and Barbuda	2012	2	0
Total		2	0
