= Trevor Robinson (footballer) =

Jamaican footballer (born 1984)

Personal information
- Full name: Trevor Robinson
- Date of birth: 20 September 1984 (age 42)
- Place of birth: St Catherines, Jamaica
- Height: 6 ft 1 in (1.85 m)
- Position: Midfielder

Senior career*
Years	Team	Apps	(Gls)
2003–2006	Millwall	4	(0)
2005	→ Tamworth (loan)	2	(0)
2006	→ Cambridge United (loan)	4	(0)
2006	Cambridge United	9	(0)
- * Club domestic league appearances and goals

Trevor Robinson (born 20 September 1984) is a Jamaican former footballer who played as a midfielder. He played for Cambridge United.
