= Sergei Baltacha (footballer, born 1958) =

Ukrainian footballer

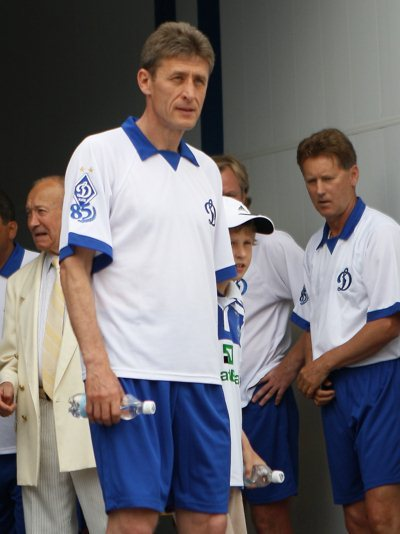
- Baltacha in 2012

Personal information
- Full name: Sergei Pavlovich Baltacha
- Date of birth: 17 February 1958 (age 68)
- Place of birth: Zhdanov, Ukrainian SSR, Soviet Union
- Height: 1.83 m (6 ft 0 in)
- Position: Defender

Youth career
- 1970–1971: Azovstal Zhdanov
- 1972–1976: Kharkiv Oblast boarding school

Senior career*
Years	Team	Apps	(Gls)
1976–1988	Dynamo Kyiv	245	(6)
1976	→ Metalist Kharkiv (loan)	18	(1)
1988–1990	Ipswich Town	28	(1)
1990–1993	St Johnstone	90	(1)
1993–1994	Inverness Caledonian		
1994–1995	Caledonian Thistle	9	(0)

International career
1980–1988	Soviet Union	45	(2)

Managerial career
- 1993–1994: Inverness Caledonian
- 1994–1995: Caledonian Thistle
Medal record
Representing Soviet Union
UEFA European Championship
Runner-up	1988 West Germany
Olympic Men's Football
Bronze medal – third place	1980 Moscow
FIFA U-20 World Cup
Winner	1977 Tunisia
UEFA European Under-21 Championship
Winner	1980 Europe
- * Club domestic league appearances and goals

Sergei Pavlovich Baltacha (Russian: Сергей Павлович Балтача; Ukrainian: Сергій Павлович Балтача; Serhiy Pavlovych Baltacha; born 17 February 1958) is a Ukrainian former professional football player and coach who played as a defender. He won 45 caps for the Soviet Union and made nearly 300 appearances for Dynamo Kyiv.

== Career ==
Baltacha was developed by longtime Dynamo Kyiv and USSR national team coach Valeriy Lobanovskyi, who spotted Baltacha at the Kharkiv Oblast sports boarding school (today the Kharkiv College of Sports) of footballing excellence, which he had left home to attend at the age of 13. Before moving to Kharkiv, Baltacha started his football career in native Mariupol playing for local youth sports club "Azovstal". While being officially invited to Dynamo, in 1976 Baltacha spent his first season on loan playing for Metalist Kharkiv which at that time was playing at the third tier and his second season in Dynamo's reserves. It wasn't until 1978 when he finally made his debut for the Dynamo's first team that was hosting Spartak Moscow on 28 April 1978.

As preparation to the 1980 Summer Olympics, in 1979 Baltacha played couple of games for Ukraine at the Spartakiad of the Peoples of the USSR.

Baltacha was on the winning side in the Cup Winners' Cup in 1986, the Soviet Top League and Soviet Cup four times, and the Soviet Super Cup on three occasions. He also appeared in the FIFA World Cup in 1982, was a finalist in the European Championships in 1988 and won the bronze medal at the 1980 Summer Olympics in Moscow.

As the Soviet government eased restrictions on traveling abroad for athletes, in 1988 at age 30 Baltacha traveled to England and Scotland, playing for Ipswich Town and St Johnstone. His debut for Ipswich (in which he scored) was the first time a Soviet international had played in the Football League. He also had a spell as player manager of Inverness Caledonian in the Scottish Highland Football League, and was with Caledonian when they amalgamated with Inverness Thistle and entered the Scottish Football League in 1994 as Caledonian Thistle.

Baltacha worked as a physical education teacher and tutor at Bacon's College in South East London until 2012, having formerly been a physical education teacher at Geoffrey Chaucer Technology College (Old Kent Road, London) and a coach at the Charlton Athletic academy. Since 2012 Sergei Baltacha works as Professional Development Phase Lead Coach at the Charlton Athletic FC Academy.

== Personal life ==
His ex-wife, Olga, master of sports in athletics, could have been on the Soviet olympic pentathlon team in 1980 Summer Olympics, but instead opted to remain at home to care for their one-year-old son, Sergei Jr, who became a professional footballer.

Their daughter, Elena, was a professional tennis player. She died from liver cancer in 2014, aged 30.

Baltacha was married to Oksana.

Born in the Ukrainian part of the Soviet Union, Baltacha regards himself to be multi-national. His career achievements resulted in him being inducted into the Viktor Leonenko Hall of Fame in March 2012. Baltacha has stated in interview "I'm a citizen of the Soviet Union, but I love Ukraine. As for now, I've been in the United Kingdom for over 23 years, it's my home. But I still go back to Ukraine regularly. It's a beautiful country with good, kind people. I want to see it become more like European countries. But, I don't think it has to lose ties with Russia, we are similar people, it's in our blood."

== Career statistics ==
=== International goals ===
#	Date	Venue	Opponent	Score	Result	Competition
1.	19 June 1982	Estadio La Rosaleda, Málaga, Spain	New Zealand	3–0	Win	1982 FIFA World Cup
2.	13 October 1982	Central Lenin Stadium, Moscow, Soviet Union	Finland	2–0	Win	UEFA Euro 1984 qualifying
Correct as of 21 May 2016
