= Chad Harpur =

South African soccer player

Chad Lee Harpur
Personal information
- Full name: Chad Lee Harpur
- Date of birth: 3 September 1982 (age 44)
- Place of birth: Johannesburg, South Africa
- Height: 1.83 m (6 ft 0 in)
- Position: Goalkeeper

Senior career*
Years	Team	Apps	(Gls)
2001	Molesey		
- Basingstoke Town
	Millwall	0	(0)
	Leeds United	0	(0)
- Maritzburg Classic
2003–2005	Manning Rangers		
2006–2007	Dundee	1	(0)
2007–2009	Kilmarnock	1	(0)
- Ajax Cape Town
- Mpumalanga Black Aces
- * Club domestic league appearances and goals

Chad Harpur (born 3 September 1982) is a South African former professional footballer who played as a goalkeeper.

== Career ==
Harpur played for Molesey in 2001, receiving an injury on his debut. He also played in England for Basingstoke Town, Millwall and Leeds United.

After a spell in South Africa with Maritzburg Classic and Manning Rangers, Harpur spent the 2006–07 season with Dundee in Scotland, making one league appearance. He spent the next season with Kilmarnock, leaving the club in 2009.

Harpur also played in South Africa for Manning Rangers, Ajax Cape Town and Mpumalanga Black Aces; he retired from playing in 2012, taking a sporting director role at La Manga Club in Spain.
