= Darren Ward (footballer, born 1978) =

English footballer

Personal information
- Full name: Darren Philip Ward
- Date of birth: 13 September 1978 (age 48)
- Place of birth: Kenton, Harrow, Middlesex, England
- Height: 6 ft 3 in (1.91 m)
- Position: Centre back

Senior career*
Years	Team	Apps	(Gls)
1995–2001	Watford	58	(1)
1999–2000	→ Queens Park Rangers (loan)	14	(0)
2001–2005	Millwall	142	(4)
2005–2007	Crystal Palace	63	(5)
2007–2010	Wolverhampton Wanderers	31	(0)
2008	→ Watford (loan)	9	(1)
2009	→ Charlton Athletic (loan)	16	(0)
2009	→ Millwall (loan)	9	(0)
2010–2013	Millwall	87	(2)
2012–2013	→ Swindon Town (loan)	17	(1)
2013–2015	Swindon Town	58	(1)
2015	→ Crawley Town (loan)	18	(1)
2015–2017	Yeovil Town	34	(4)
2018–2019	Hemel Hempstead Town	47	(1)
Total		603	(21)

Managerial career
- 2013: Swindon Town (joint caretaker manager)
- 2026: Arlesey Town
- * Club domestic league appearances and goals

Darren Philip Ward (born 13 September 1978) is an English former professional footballer and manager. Ward has played for all three major South London teams, Charlton Athletic, Crystal Palace and Millwall. He also played for and was briefly joint caretaker manager at Swindon Town. He most recently was manager of Arlesey Town.

== Playing career ==
Born in Kenton, a district of Harrow, Ward started his career at Watford, making his debut on 20 April 1996 against arch-rivals Luton. But opportunities were scant for Ward in the next few seasons – he made eight appearances in 1996–97 and, after suffering a badly broken leg, only one appearance in each of the following two seasons.

Ward was loaned out to Q.P.R., in the 1999–2000 season, playing fifteen games, and was generally impressive. On his return to Watford he became one of their first-team centre-halves, playing against teams like Manchester United and Arsenal in the club's final two months in the Premier League and scoring in a 1–1 draw with Middlesbrough. On their return to Division 1, Ward continued to be a first team regular, making 40 appearances in 2000–01.

Gianluca Vialli's arrival at Vicarage Road in the summer of 2001 saw a considerable re-modelling of the side, and Ward was one of the casualties. He moved to Millwall in October 2001 for £500,000 where he became a regular first team player, and was nicknamed 'The Peckham Beckham', due to the fact that his haircut is similar to that of former England captain David Beckham. At The New Den, Ward and Matthew Lawrence stood out at the central defensive position, as the Lions played in the 2004 FA Cup Final, against Manchester United. Ward played the full 90 minutes, as Millwall were beaten 3–0.

In May 2005 he moved across south-London to Crystal Palace for £1.1m, signing a three-year deal. Ward initially did well and his goalscoring form made him very popular, but by the end of his first season this good form disappeared, and by May 2007 he was out of the side, with Mark Hudson and Leon Cort preferred instead.

In July 2007, Ward joined Wolves on a three-year contract for an undisclosed fee however it was announced in May 2008 that he would be one of many casualties leaving the club, after spending less than a year there. However, after showing a positive attitude, Ward was taken off the transfer list and told to fight for his place.

He went on a two-month loan to Watford in September 2008, the club where he began his career, but this was halted after nine appearances when he suffered a cheekbone fracture. He scored once during his second spell at Watford, in a 3–0 win over QPR.

He joined Charlton Athletic on loan for the remainder of the 2008–09 season on 30 January 2009, but was unable to prevent the team being relegated to League One. He returned to his parent club in the summer, who loaned him out again in September 2009, this time to his former team Millwall on a three-month loan, made permanent on 1 January 2010. He signed a three-year contract extension with Millwall in June 2010.

=== Swindon Town ===
Ward signed permanently for Swindon Town on 4 January 2013, after a successful loan spell. He signed a four-month loan deal at the beginning of the 2012–13 season until January which resulted in signing the 18-month deal.

On 20 February, following the departure of Paolo Di Canio, Swindon announced that along with Tommy Miller, Ward would be taking temporary charge of the squad for the game against Preston on 23 February.

==== Crawley Town (loan) ====
On 8 January 2015, it was announced that Ward would be joining Crawley Town on loan from Swindon Town until the end of the 2014–15 season. Ward had made 499 career appearances, and has said that he wants to make it to the 600 mark. He scored his first goal for Crawley in a 2–0 win over Notts County on 18 April 2015.

=== Yeovil Town ===
On 8 November 2015, Ward signed for Yeovil Town on a short-term contract until January 2016. After being made captain of Yeovil following the appointment of Darren Way as manager, Ward signed an extension to his contract until June 2017. At the end of the 2016–17 season, Ward was released by Yeovil along with five other players.

=== Hemel Hempstead Town ===
In February 2018, Ward signed for National League South side Hemel Hempstead Town.

== Coaching career ==
In May 2026, Ward was named the new manager of Bedfordshire-based Step 9 Spartan South Midlands Football League side Arlesey Town. by Matt, the clubs chairman.

== Personal life ==
Darren is the brother of ex-Luton Town goalkeeper Scott Ward and Notts County's ex-West Ham United defender Elliott Ward. He turned down the opportunity of joining West Ham and the Premiership before opting for Palace, claiming he didn't want to keep his brother out of the team.

As of February 2011, he runs a cattery in Hertfordshire.

== Career statistics ==
As of 6 March 2018.

Appearances and goals by club, season and competition
Club	Season	League			FA Cup		League Cup		Other		Total	
Club	Season	Division	Apps	Goals	Apps	Goals	Apps	Goals	Apps	Goals	Apps	Goals
Watford	1995–96	First Division	0	0	0	0	0	0	—		0	0
Watford	1996–97	Second Division	7	0	1	0	0	0	0	0	8	0
Watford	1997–98	Second Division	0	0	0	0	0	0	1 (Note: Appearances in Football League Trophy)	0	1	0
Watford	1998–99	First Division	1	0	0	0	0	0	0	0	1	0
Watford	1999–2000	Premier League	9	0	0	0	0	0	—		9	0
Watford	2000–01	First Division	40	1	1	0	5	1	—		46	2
Watford	2001–02	First Division	1	0	0	0	1	0	—		2	0
Watford	Total		58	1	2	0	6	1	1	0	67	2
Queens Park Rangers (loan)	1999–2000	First Division	14	0	1	0	0	0	—		15	0
Millwall	2001–02	First Division	14	0	1	0	0	0	2 (Note: Appearances in First Division play-offs)	0	17	0
Millwall	2002–03	First Division	39	1	4	0	1	0	—		44	1
Millwall	2003–04	First Division	46	3	7	0	1	0	—		54	3
Millwall	2004–05	Championship	43	0	0	0	1	0	2 (Note: Appearances in UEFA Cup)	0	46	0
Millwall	Total		142	4	12	0	3	0	4	0	161	4
Crystal Palace	2005–06	Championship	43	5	2	1	0	0	1 (Note: Appearance in Championship play-offs)	0	46	6
Crystal Palace	2006–07	Championship	20	0	2	0	1	0	—		23	0
Crystal Palace	Total		63	5	4	1	1	0	1	0	69	6
Wolverhampton Wanderers	2007–08	Championship	30	0	2	0	0	0	—		32	0
Wolverhampton Wanderers	2008–09	Championship	1	0	0	0	1	0	—		2	0
Wolverhampton Wanderers	2009–10	Premier League	0	0	0	0	0	0	—		0	0
Wolverhampton Wanderers	Total		31	0	2	0	1	0	—		33	0
Watford (loan)	2008–09	Championship	9	1	0	0	0	0	—		9	1
Charlton Athletic (loan)	2008–09	Championship	16	0	0	0	0	0	—		16	0
Millwall (loan)	2009–10	League One	9	0	1	0	0	0	0	0	10	0
Millwall	2009–10	League One	25	1	1	0	0	0	0	0	26	1
Millwall	2010–11	Championship	31	1	1	0	3	0	—		35	1
Millwall	2011–12	Championship	30	0	4	0	2	0	—		36	0
Millwall	2012–13	Championship	1	0	0	0	1	1	—		2	1
Millwall	Total		96	2	7	0	6	1	0	0	109	3
Swindon Town (loan)	2012–13	League One	17	1	1	0	0	0	1	0	19	1
Swindon Town	2012–13	League One	22	1	0	0	0	0	2 (Note: Appearances in League One play-offs)	0	24	1
Swindon Town	2013–14	League One	36	0	1	0	3	0	5	0	45	0
Swindon Town	2014–15	League One	0	0	0	0	0	0	0	0	0	0
Swindon Town	Total		75	2	2	0	3	0	8	0	88	2
Crawley Town (loan)	2014–15	League One	18	1	0	0	0	0	0	0	18	1
Yeovil Town	2015–16	League Two	18	1	3	0	0	0	2	0	23	1
Yeovil Town	2016–17	League Two	16	3	2	0	0	0	0	0	18	3
Yeovil Town	Total		34	4	5	0	0	0	2	0	41	4
Hemel Hempstead Town	2017–18	National League South	4	1	0	0	—		0	0	4	1
Career total			560	21	35	1	20	2	16	0	631	24

== Honours ==
Millwall

- Football League One play-offs: 2010
- FA Cup runner-up: 2003–04

Individual

- Millwall Player of the Year: 2003–04, 2004–05
