= Sergei Baltacha (footballer, born 1979) =

Scottish footballer

Personal information
- Full name: Sergei Baltacha Jr.
- Date of birth: 28 July 1979 (age 47)
- Place of birth: Kyiv, Soviet Union
- Position: Left back

Youth career
- Dynamo Kiev

Senior career*
Years	Team	Apps	(Gls)
1999–2003	St Mirren	64	(2)
2003–2004	Millwall	2	(0)
2004–2005	Petershill		

International career
1999–2000	Scotland U-21	3	(0)
- * Club domestic league appearances and goals

Sergei Baltacha (born 28 July 1979) is a former footballer. Born in the USSR (now Ukraine), Baltacha represented Scotland at youth international level.

== Club career ==
He first played football in the Dynamo Kiev academy, but began his professional career in Scotland, at St Mirren, where he gained 3 caps for the Scotland U-21 side. After a trial at Portsmouth he joined Millwall in January 2003 and was released a year later, after which he had an unsuccessful trial with Queen of the South, and St Johnstone before signing with Petershill in 2004. He retired from professional football in 2005/2006.

== International career ==
Baltacha was eligible to play for Russia, Ukraine and under FIFA regulations at the time, the four Home nations as a British passport holder born outside of the United Kingdom with no British parental or grand-parental bloodlines. Baltacha Jr. had moved to the United Kingdom with his father, Sergei Pavlovich Baltacha, when he signed for Ipswich Town and at the age of 11 moved to Scotland when Baltacha Sr. signed for St Johnstone in May 1990. Having acquired a British passport, in 1999, he represented Scotland at U21 level against Lithuania.

== Personal life ==
His father, Sergei, played football for the Soviet Union; his mother, Olga, was a pentathlete; and his sister, Elena, was a former British number one in women's tennis.
