= Christophe Kinet =

Belgian footballer

Personal information
- Date of birth: 31 December 1974
- Place of birth: Huy, Belgium
- Height: 1.73 m (5 ft 8 in)
- Position: Midfielder

Senior career*
Years	Team	Apps	(Gls)
1994–1995	Liège	26	(3)
1995–1997	Germinal Ekeren	38	(4)
1997–2000	RC Strasbourg	27	(2)
2000–2003	Millwall	69	(7)
2003–2004	FC Brussels	7	(1)
2005–2006	Sparta Rotterdam	14	(1)
2006–2011	Liège		
- * Club domestic league appearances and goals

Christophe Kinet (born 31 December 1974) is a Belgian former footballer who played as a midfielder. He played in the Belgian, British, French and Dutch league for, among others Millwall F.C., Sparta Rotterdam, RC Strasbourg, FC Brussels and RFC Liège.

== Career ==
Born in Huy, Belgium, Kinet started his youth training at R.S.C. Anderlecht. He quit Anderlecht for studies.

He joined Millwall F.C. in 2000, then playing in the second league and left Millwall again in 2002, only to be brought back shortly afterwards. One of his most memorable moments at Millwall was scoring a hat-trick against Northampton in the Football League Trophy.

In the 2004–05 winter transfer window Kinet transferred from FC Brussels to Sparta Rotterdam. During the 2005–06 season, he transferred to then third division club RFC de Liege, after Roeselare expressed initial interest.

== Personal life ==
Kinet left Millwall because his then-girlfriend was expecting a baby. Kinet returned to Belgium and became the father of a son, named Henrick.

== Honours ==
Germinal Ekeren

- Belgian Cup: 1996–97

Millwall

- Football League Second Division: 2000–01
