= Matt Lawrence (English footballer) =

English footballer

Personal information
- Full name: Matthew James Lawrence
- Date of birth: 19 June 1974 (age 52)
- Place of birth: Northampton, England
- Height: 6 ft 1 in (1.85 m)
- Positions: Right back; centre back

College career
Years	Team	Apps	(Gls)
1992–1995	Hartwick Hawks		

Senior career*
Years	Team	Apps	(Gls)
1995–1996	Grays Athletic		
1996–1997	Wycombe Wanderers	16	(1)
1997–1998	Fulham	59	(0)
1998–2000	Wycombe Wanderers	63	(4)
2000–2006	Millwall	226	(0)
2006–2010	Crystal Palace	121	(1)
2010–2012	Gillingham	69	(0)
2012–2014	Whitehawk	35	(1)
2014–2015	Burgess Hill Town	0	(0)
Total		589	(7)
- * Club domestic league appearances and goals

Matthew James Lawrence (born 19 June 1974) is an English former footballer who played as a centre back.

== Playing career ==
Lawrence began his career as a midfielder, starting out late at Grays Athletic in August 1995, age 21, having taken an American literature degree whilst playing college soccer in the United States for Hartwick College. In February 2009, Hartwick inducted Lawrence into the school's Athletic Hall of Fame.

Five months later, Lawrence became a Football League player, when he joined Wycombe Wanderers for £20,000. He made 21 appearances for Wycombe before moving on to Fulham, for an undisclosed fee. He spent 20 months at the west London side, making over 60 appearances, before going back to Wycombe on a free transfer following Fulham's failure to gain promotion to Division One.

He had a more successful spell at The Chairboys this time, before going to Millwall in March 2000 for £200,000. At Millwall, he began a new role as a right-back, and starred, only missing one game and being voted the fans' Player of The Year, as Millwall were promoted to Division One as champions in 2000–01 season. He started the 2001–02 season well, but sustained a concussion, the results of which kept him out of the side for some time. On his return, he found his best form to date for the club, as they reached the Division One play-offs.

At the start of the 2003–04 campaign, Lawrence fell out with Lions boss Mark McGhee, and looked to be on his way out of The New Den. However, McGhee was replaced by Dennis Wise, and Lawrence got his place back. It was then that he switched to central defence, playing alongside Darren Ward, and the duo stood out, with the Lions reaching the 2004 FA Cup final, for which Lawrence was captain, and thus qualifying for the UEFA Cup.

Wise left the club at the end of the 2004–05 season, and defensive partner Ward left for Crystal Palace, and Lawrence found himself playing in a number of positions under a variety of different managers during the disastrous 2005–06 campaign, as the Lions were relegated back to League One.

Nigel Spackman was appointed manager at the New Den, but Lawrence did not play competitively under him, as he moved to rivals Crystal Palace to rekindle his partnership with Darren Ward. After an average first season, Lawrence began to excel under the leadership of Neil Warnock at Selhurst Park. He scored his first goal for Palace against Sheffield Wednesday on 22 March 2008. His contract at Selhurst Park expired at the end of the 2009–10 season, and in August 2010 he joined Gillingham of League Two on a one-year deal, and made his debut for them in goalless draw away to Hereford United on 14 August.

In July 2012 he joined non-League side Whitehawk.

In 2014, he joined Burgess Hill Town; however, he did not make an appearance in either the league or any cup competitions for the club.

== Career statistics ==
Appearances and goals by club, season and competition
Club	Season	League			FA Cup		League Cup		Other		Total	
Club	Season	Division	Apps	Goals	Apps	Goals	Apps	Goals	Apps	Goals	Apps	Goals
Wycombe Wanderers	1995–96	Division Two	3	0	0	0	0	0	0	0	3	0
Wycombe Wanderers	1996–97	Division Two	13	1	0	0	4	0	0	0	17	1
Total			16	1	0	0	4	0	0		20	1
Fulham	1996–97	Division Three	13	0	0	0	0	0	0	0	13	0
Fulham	1997–98	Division Two	45	0	2	0	4	0	3 (Note: Appearance(s) in Football League Trophy)	0	54	0
Fulham	1998–99	Division Two	1	0	0	0	1	0	0	0	2	0
Total			59	0	2	0	5	0	3		69	0
Wycombe Wanderers	1998–99	Division Two	34	2	3	0	0	0	2	0	39	2
Wycombe Wanderers	1999–2000	Division Two	29	2	4	0	4	0	1	0	38	2
Total			63	4	7	0	4	0	3		77	4
Millwall	1999–2000	Division Two	11	0	0	0	0	0	0	0	11	0
Millwall	2000–01	Division Two	45	0	3	0	4	0	2	0	54	0
Millwall	2001–02	Division One	26	0	2	0	2	0	2 (Note: Appearance(s) in Division One play-offs)	0	32	0
Millwall	2002–03	Division One	33	0	4	0	1	0	0	0	38	0
Millwall	2003–04	Division One	36	0	7	0	1	0	0	0	44	0
Millwall	2004–05	Championship	44	0	1	0	1	0	2 (Note: Appearance(s) in UEFA Cup)	0	48	0
Millwall	2005–06	Championship	31	0	2	0	1	0	0	0	34	0
Total			226	0	19	0	10	0	6		261	0
Crystal Palace	2006-07	Championship	34	0	2	0	1	0	0	0	37	0
Crystal Palace	2007-08	Championship	37	1	1	0	1	0	2	0	41	1
Crystal Palace	2008-09	Championship	32	0	3	0	1	0	0	0	36	0
Crystal Palace	2009-10	Championship	18	0	3	0	0	0	0	0	21	0
Total			121	1	9	0	3	0	2		135	1
Gillingham	2010-11	League Two	43	0	1	0	0	0	0	0	44	0
Gillingham	2011-12	League Two	26	0	2	0	1	0	0	0	29	0
Total			69	0	3	0	1	0	0		73	0
Whitehawk	2012-13	Isthmian League Premier	9	1	0	0	0	0	0	0	9	1
Whitehawk	2013-14	Conference South	26	0	0	0	0	0	3 (Note: Appearance(s) in FA Trophy)	0	29	0
Total			35	1	0	0	0	0	3		38	1
Burgess Hill Town	2014-15	Isthmian League Division One South	0	0	0	0	0	0	0	0	0	0
Career total			589	7	40	0	27	0	17	0	673	7

== Life outside football ==
In preparation for the 2007–08 season, Lawrence wrote a weekly "pre-season diary" for The London Paper. This appeared every Monday for five weeks, a popular piece which led to him being given a regular column in the matchday programme over the season. He was signed up to write a weekly column for The Mirror.

Lawrence joined the Sporting Kansas City broadcast team as a colour commentator ahead of the 2017 Major League Soccer season.

== Honours ==
Fulham

- Football League Third Division: 1996–97

Millwall

- Football League Second Division: 2000–01
- FA Cup runner-up: 2003–04

Individual

- Millwall Player of the Season: 2000–01
- PFA Team of the Year: 2000–01 Second Division
