= Leke Odunsi =

English footballer

Personal information
- Full name: Saheed Adeleke Odunsi
- Date of birth: 5 December 1980 (age 45)
- Place of birth: Lambeth, England
- Height: 5 ft 9 in (1.75 m)
- Position: Midfielder

Youth career
- ?–1998: Millwall

Senior career*
Years	Team	Apps	(Gls)
1998–2002	Millwall	16	(0)
2002	Kingstonian	1	(0)
2002–2003	Colchester United	6	(0)
2003	Bromley	?	(?)
2003	Carshalton Athletic	?	(?)
2003	Southend United	12	(1)
- * Club domestic league appearances and goals as of 16:15, 10 April 2009 (UTC)

Saheed Adeleke Odunsi (born 5 December 1980) is an English footballer, who played as a midfielder for Football League clubs Millwall, Colchester United and Southend United.

He made his debut for Millwall in the Football League Trophy, in the 2–0 home win against Cardiff City on 9 December 1998, coming on as a substitute in the 83rd minute for Tim Cahill. He made his Football League debut against Colchester United in the 2–0 home defeat, on 14 April 1999. He played for Southend United in 2003/04 scoring against Huddersfield Town at Roots Hall in Southend Utd's defeat 1–2 on 4 October 2003.
