= Joe Dolan (footballer) =

English footballer (born 1980)

Personal information
- Full name: Joseph Thomas Dolan
- Date of birth: 27 May 1980 (age 46)
- Place of birth: Southwark, England
- Height: 6 ft 3 in (1.91 m)
- Position: Defender

Youth career
- 199?–1997: Chelsea

Senior career*
Years	Team	Apps	(Gls)
1997–1998	Chelsea	0	(0)
1998–2005	Millwall	49	(3)
2004–2005	→ Crawley Town (loan)	12	(0)
2005	→ Stockport County (loan)	11	(1)
2005	→ Brighton & Hove Albion (loan)	3	(0)
2005–2006	Leyton Orient	2	(0)
2005	→ Stockport County (loan)	2	(0)
2005	→ Fisher Athletic (loan)	5	(0)
2006	Canvey Island	5	(0)
2006–2009	Basingstoke Town	143	(7)
2009–2010	Carshalton Athletic	12	(0)
2010	Croydon Athletic	10	(0)
2010	Cray Wanderers	3	(0)
2010–2011	Kingstonian	1	(0)
2011	Bromley	18	(0)
2012	Staines	6	(0)
2012	Havant & Waterlooville	13	(1)
2012–13	Metropolitan Police		
2013	Walton Casuals	4	(0)

International career
1998–1999	Northern Ireland U18	5	(0)
1999–2000	Northern Ireland U21	6	(0)
- * Club domestic league appearances and goals

Joe Dolan (born 27 May 1980) is an English-born Northern Irish former footballer who last played for Walton Casuals.

As a professional footballer, he played in the Football League for Millwall, Stockport County, Brighton & Hove Albion and Leyton Orient. He featured for 18 teams throughout his career, failing to make an appearance for Chelsea.

== Professional career ==
After playing for the youth team of non-League Elmstead, Dolan started his career as a trainee at Chelsea, but was unable to feature for the first team after signing a professional contract ahead of the 1997-98 season. On 15 April 1998, Dolan completed a move to Millwall. The defender was a regular at The Den until breaking his leg, but was unable to reproduce his ability after recovering from the injury.

In October 2004, Dolan joined Crawley Town on a three-month loan deal. Scoring once in 12 appearances for the Red Devils, he also had temporary stays with Stockport County and Brighton & Hove Albion for the remainder of the campaign. He was released at the end of the season.

Dolan joined Leyton Orient on 5 July 2005, but only managed two appearances before his release in January 2006. During his time with the club, he returned to Stockport County on loan while also featuring for Fisher Athletic.

== Semi-professional career ==
Dolan joined Canvey Island in January 2006, making his first permanent transfer in non-league football. He remained with the club for the 2005–06 season, before joining Basingstoke Town in July 2006. Spending three years at the Camrose, he left the club to join Isthmian Premier Division side Carshalton Athletic in October 2009, reuniting with former Basingstoke manager Francis Vines.

In February 2010, Dolan joined Isthmian Division One South side Croydon Athletic, before signing for Cray Wanderers nine months later. However, after just a month with the Wands he joined Kingstonian. In March 2011, he dual registered with Conference South outfit Lewes, before eventually joining Bromley.

Following a short stay with Staines Town, he signed for Havant & Waterlooville in February 2012. Dolan scored an injury time winner against his former club to save Havant from relegation, but was released at the end of the season.

Joining Metropolitan Police for the 2012–13 season, he made the move to Walton Casuals in the final weeks of the season before retiring from non-league football. He later moved to Australia and gained his UEFA A Licence.

== Coaching career ==
In April 2013, following his retirement from playing, Dolan joined Crystal Palace as an Under-12 coach and Head of Education and Welfare. Having gained his UEFA A Licence, he became Director or Football at The Southport School in January 2015 following a move to Australia.

== International career ==
Dolan played five teams for the Northern Ireland U18 team, and six times for the Northern Ireland U21 team. On 24 August 1998, Dolan made his international debut in a 2–1 win over Wales. He also featured against Moldova, Germany on two occasions and Republic of Ireland.

On 8 October 1999, he made his U21 debut in a 2–1 defeat to Finland. He later played against Malta twice, Scotland, Denmark and Iceland. In his international career, Dolan recorded four wins, three draws and four defeats.

== Honours ==
Millwall

- Football League Second Division: 2000–01
- Football League Trophy runner-up: 1998–99
