= Dave Tuttle =

English footballer and manager

Personal information
- Full name: David Philip Tuttle
- Date of birth: 6 February 1972 (age 54)
- Place of birth: Reading, England
- Position: Defender

Senior career*
Years	Team	Apps	(Gls)
1990–1993	Tottenham Hotspur	13	(0)
1993	→ Peterborough United (loan)	7	(0)
1993–1996	Sheffield United	63	(1)
1996–1999	Crystal Palace	80	(5)
1999	→ Charlton Athletic (loan)	0	(0)
1999–2000	Barnsley	11	(1)
2000–2003	Millwall	23	(0)
2002	→ Wycombe Wanderers (loan)	4	(0)
2007	Dorking	0	(0)
Total		201	(7)

Managerial career
- 2005–2006: Millwall
- 2006: Swindon Town (caretaker)
- 2009–2010: Bracknell Town
- 2010–2012: Henley Town
- 2012: Hartley Wintney
- 2012–2013: Newbury
- 2015–2016: Burnham
- 2019–2023: AFC Aldermaston
- 2024–2025: Aylesbury United
- 2026-: Eagles Land Benfica F.C.
- * Club domestic league appearances and goals

David Philip Tuttle (born 6 February 1972 in Mortimer Common, Berkshire) is an English former footballer.

== Career ==
As a player, Tuttle was a central defender. He began his playing career at Tottenham Hotspur, where he scored his first professional goal in the 1991–92 European Cup Winners' Cup against Hajduk Split. He subsequently had spells with Sheffield United, Crystal Palace, Barnsley and Millwall.

Tuttle became assistant manager to Colin Lee at Millwall and was later appointed manager of Millwall in December 2005 with the target of saving the club from relegation to League One. After failing in his task he left two games before the end of the 2005–06 season.

Tuttle later moved to Swindon Town to run their youth set-up and scouting, linking up with former Millwall teammate Dennis Wise. When Wise left to manage Leeds United in October 2006 Tuttle briefly became caretaker manager but the left the job just 24 hours later. He later left Swindon after Paul Sturrock was appointed. Tuttle joined Dorking in an advisory capacity in June 2007, also signing for the club as a player, though a few weeks later he was appointed chief scout of Milton Keynes Dons.

On 27 August 2009, Tuttle was confirmed as the new manager of struggling Southern League Division One South and West side Bracknell Town.

In July 2010, Tuttle was appointed as manager of Hellenic League East Div 1 side Henley Town, where he gained promotion to the Hellenic League Premier Division with a young Henley Town squad in his first season with the club.

In June 2012 he was appointed as manager of Hartley Wintney. But after just a few months at Hartley Wintney was appointed as the new boss at Hellenic League side Newbury. After just a few months at Newbury Tuttle was relieved of his duties on 11 January 2013.

On 23 November 2015, Tuttle was announced as manager of Southern League Division One South & West side Burnham. On 22 August 2016, it was announced that he had parted company with Burnham, after a run of four straight defeats at the start of the Hellenic League season. He was appointed manager of AFC Aldermaston in October 2019. He left Aldermaston at the end of the 2022–23 season.

In January 2024 he was appointed caretaker manager of Aylesbury United a job which he later took on permanently, seeing the side improve greatly since his arrival.

== Honours ==
Crystal Palace

- Football League First Division play-offs: 1997
