= Ronnie Bull (footballer) =

English footballer (born 1980)

Personal information
- Full name: Ronnie Rodney Bull
- Date of birth: 27 December 1980 (age 45)
- Place of birth: Hackney, England
- Height: 5 ft 8 in (1.73 m)
- Position: Left back

Youth career
- –1999: Millwall

Senior career*
Years	Team	Apps	(Gls)
1999–2004	Millwall	50	(0)
2003	→ Yeovil Town (loan)	7	(0)
2004	→ Brentford (loan)	14	(0)
2004	Brentford	6	(0)
2004–2005	Grimsby Town	27	(2)
2005–2006	New Zealand Knights	7	(0)
2006	Basingstoke Town	1	(0)
2006	Rushden & Diamonds	19	(0)
2006–2007	Grays Athletic	3	(0)
2007–2008	Crawley Town	37	(2)
2008	Ebbsfleet United	9	(0)
2008	Fisher Athletic	3	(0)
2008–2009	Exeter City	0	(0)
2009–2010	Grays Athletic	4	(0)
2010–2012	Salisbury City	9	(0)
2012	Eastbourne Borough	0	(0)
2012–2013	Hayes & Yeading United	12	(0)
Total		208	(4)
- * Club domestic league appearances and goals

Ronnie Rodney Bull (born 27 December 1980) is an English former professional footballer who played as a left full back and left-sided or central midfielder from 1999 to 2013.

He played in the Football League for Millwall, Yeovil Town, Brentford, Grimsby Town and Exeter City as well as playing in the Australian A-League for the New Zealand Knights. He later returned to England and forged a career playing non-League football, having appeared for Basingstoke Town, Rushden & Diamonds, Grays Athletic, Crawley Town, Ebbsfleet United, Fisher Athletic and Salisbury City.

== Playing career ==
=== Millwall ===
Bull started his career with Millwall, playing in the same youth side as Tim Cahill and Lucas Neill. He made 50 appearances before his release in April 2004. By this point, he had completed loan spells with Yeovil Town and Brentford and joined the latter club on a permanent deal for the final month of the 2003–04 season.

=== Grimsby Town ===
In 2004, he left Brentford to join Grimsby Town. Bull stayed for a season before he was offered a move abroad.

=== New Zealand Knights ===
He then moved to New Zealand to play for the New Zealand Knights in the newly formed A-League. He made many appearances for them before leaving the side.

=== Return to England ===
Bull left the club in November 2005 to return to the UK, less than halfway through the Knights' disastrous first season. In 2006, he returned to Millwall to train, attempting to increase his fitness after injury.

On his return to England, he signed with Rushden & Diamonds. He left Rushden in November 2006 to join Grays Athletic. He then signed for Crawley Town during the January 2007 transfer window, and scored on his debut against Aldershot Town.

Bull left Crawley in January 2008 after he was told he was surplus to requirements. He subsequently signed for Ebbsfleet United, but he was released at the end of the 2007–08 season.

He went on trial with Salisbury in the summer of 2008 before he joined Fisher Athletic in October 2008. He made just a handful of appearances before joining Exeter City. It was announced in January 2009 that he was to stay with the League Two side until the end of the 2008–09 season.

At the start of the 2009–10 season, Bull rejoined for Grays Athletic along with eight other players. This was after he had been in talks with Salisbury City, but a move failed to materialise because of the club's financial position.

=== Salisbury City ===
On 2 February 2010, Bull signed for Salisbury City on a contract that kept him at the club until the end of the 2009–10 season. Then after this he signed a new contract keeping him at Salisbury for another year.

=== Eastbourne Borough ===
Bull signed for Eastbourne Borough on 17 February 2012. Bull left Eastbourne at the end of the season without having made a first team appearance.
