= Matthew Rees (footballer) =

Welsh footballer (born 1982)

Personal information
- Date of birth: 2 September 1982 (age 44)
- Place of birth: Swansea, Wales
- Position: Defender

Senior career*
Years	Team	Apps	(Gls)
2000–2004	Millwall	0	(0)
2003	→ Aldershot Town (loan)	7	(0)
2004	→ Dagenham & Redbridge (loan)	1	(0)
2004	→ Swansea City (loan)	3	(1)
2004	Crawley Town	5	(0)
2004	Newport County	3	(0)
2004–2011	Port Talbot Town	193	(12)
2011–2012	Neath	27	(1)
2012–2013	Carmarthen Town	26	(0)
2013–2014	Afan Lido	12	(0)

International career
2002–2003	Wales U21	2	(0)
2003	Wales U20	1	(0)
- * Club domestic league appearances and goals

Matthew Rees (born 2 September 1982) is a Welsh former footballer who last played for Welsh Premier League side Afan Lido. A former Wales under-21 international, he began his career with Millwall without making a first team appearance. After loan spells with Aldershot Town and Dagenham & Redbridge, he made his debut in the Football League with Swansea City in 2004, making three appearances. He has also had spells with Crawley Town, Newport County, and Carmarthen Town.

== Club career ==
Rees began his career as a youth player at Millwall, turning professional in April 2000, and later captained the club's reserve side. Having not made a first team appearance for the club, he was allowed to join Conference National side Aldershot Town on loan in October 2003. He made his debut for the club in a 3–1 over Halifax Town on 11 October 2003, going on to make ten appearances in all competitions before being recalled from his loan spell by Millwall to cover for an injury crisis after two months. In January 2004, he returned to the Conference on loan with Dagenham & Redbridge, playing in just one match for the club, a 2–0 defeat to Exeter City. After returning to Millwall, Rees was sent out on loan for the third time during the 2003–04 season, joining his home town club Swansea City. He made a goalscoring debut during a 2–1 defeat to Lincoln City on 10 April 2004 and made two more appearances before the end of the season.

Released by Millwall on his return, Rees joined Crawley Town on non-contract terms. He remained with the club until November and, after a brief spell with Newport County, joined Welsh Premier League side Port Talbot Town in December 2004. To date, Rees has made over 150 appearances for the club, becoming the club's all-time record Welsh Premier appearance holder in December 2009, and was named Welsh Premier League player of the month for September 2006.

He joined Carmarthen Town in June 2012 after the liquidation of Neath and went on to make 73 appearances for the club, scoring 1 goal.

In August 2013 he joined Afan Lido.

== International career ==
Rees made his debut for the Wales under-21 side on 6 September 2002 as a substitute in place of Rhys Day during a 2–1 defeat to Finland. He made two further appearances during the 2002–03 season, during 0–0 draw with South Korea, in a game designated as an under-20 international, and a 1–0 win over Azerbaijan. In May 2003, despite having not made a professional appearance at club level, he was called up to the senior Wales squad for a friendly match against the United States, remaining on the bench during a 2–0 defeat.
