= Robbie Ryan (footballer) =

Irish footballer (born 1977)

Personal information
- Full name: Robert Paul Ryan
- Date of birth: 16 May 1977 (age 49)
- Place of birth: Dublin, Republic of Ireland
- Position: Left back

Youth career
- Belvedere

Senior career*
Years	Team	Apps	(Gls)
1993–1994	Huddersfield Town	15	(0)
1998–2004	Millwall	226	(2)
2004–2007	Bristol Rovers	54	(0)
2007–2008	Welling United	36	(1)
2008	Ashford Town (Kent)	9	(0)
2008	Fisher Athletic	3	(0)
2008	Croydon Athletic	18	(0)

International career
	Ireland U-21	12	(?)
- * Club domestic league appearances and goals

Robert Paul "Robbie" Ryan (born 16 May 1977 in Dublin) is an Irish retired footballer, who was a left back.

== Career ==
Ryan played his youth football for Belvedere. Ryan began his senior career at Huddersfield Town in July 1994 but did not make his first team debut until September 1996 when he came on as a sub in a 3–1 win over Ipswich Town.

After making just 15 Appearances for The Terriers, Ryan joined Millwall in 2000, costing the club £10,000. He made his debut in a 0–0 draw with Southend United. In the 2000–01 season he only missed four games for Millwall as they won the Football League Second Division title. The following season, Ryan played 32 league games as Millwall made the First Division play-offs, losing to Birmingham City.

At the end of his contract, Millwall offered him another one-year deal, which he declined in favour of a three-year deal with Bristol Rovers, despite dropping down two divisions. He had played 226 league games for Millwall. His last appearance in a Millwall shirt happened to be the 2004 FA Cup final against Manchester United where he was marking Cristiano Ronaldo.

Computer game Championship Manager played its part in Ryan's transfer. Utilising real-life statistical data, the game revealed to Ryan Molesworth, the son of Bristol Rovers scout Paul Molesworth, that Robbie Ryan's contract was expiring. Rovers then became interested in signing the player, which after negotiations, actually took place.

In the 2004–05 season, Ryan made 40 league appearances for Bristol Rovers. In 2005–06 he played only 17 games, none at all since November. On 1 February 2007 Bristol Rovers terminated Ryan's contract.

Ryan has represented the Republic of Ireland at schoolboy and youth levels playing in the 1997 FIFA World Youth Championship in Malaysia for the Republic of Ireland who came 3rd and has also picked up 12 U21 caps.

== Personal life ==
As of 2012, Ryan worked as a cable linesman for the London Underground.

== Honours ==
Millwall

- Football League Second Division: 2000–01
- FA Cup runner-up: 2003–04
