= Northern Ireland national under-18 schoolboys football team =

Association football team

Northern Ireland Under-18 Schools
- Nickname(s): The GAWA, Norn Iron
- Association: Irish Football Association
- Confederation: UEFA (Europe)
- Head coach: Conor Marlin & Frankie Wilson
- Home stadium: various
- FIFA code: NIR
First colours	Second colours

First international
- NI U18 Schools (Northern Ireland) 1-1 Australia U18 (17 December 1988, Antrim)

Biggest win
- Jersey U18 0-6 (Northern Ireland) NI U18 Schools (4 February 2009, St. Helier)

Biggest defeat
- Australia U18 8-0 (Northern Ireland) NI U18 Schools (9 January 2001, Canberra)

The Northern Ireland national under-18 schools football team (also known as Northern Ireland U18 schoolboys) represents Northern Ireland in association football at under-18 level. It is controlled by the Northern Ireland Schools Football Association (NISFA) which is affiliated to the Irish Football Association. The main competition competed for by the team is the Centenary Shield (founded 1973) which they won on the first occasion that they entered in 1996. The Northern Ireland under-18 schoolboys side also competes regularly in other minor tournaments and in friendlies.

== Honours ==
- Centenary Shield Winners: 1996, 1998, 1999, 2005 (shared), 2009 (shared), 2011, 2013

== See also ==
- Northern Ireland national football team
- Northern Ireland national under-16 football team
- Northern Ireland national under-17 football team
- Northern Ireland national under-19 football team
