= Charley Hearn =

English footballer

Personal information
- Date of birth: 5 November 1983 (age 42)
- Place of birth: Ashford, England
- Height: 5 ft 11 in (1.80 m)
- Position: Midfielder

Team information
- Current team: Erith & Belvedere

Youth career
- Millwall

Senior career*
Years	Team	Apps	(Gls)
2001–2005	Millwall	28	(4)
2004–2005	→ Northampton Town (loan)	24	(4)
2006–2007	Fisher Athletic	58	(8)
2007–2008	Grays Athletic	15	(2)
2008	→ Lewes (loan)	?	(?)
2008	→ Ebbsfleet United (loan)	13	(2)
2008–20??	Beckenham Town	?	(?)
2014–	Erith & Belvedere	?	(?)
- * Club domestic league appearances and goals as of 16:19, 30 August 2008 (UTC)

Charley Hearn (born 11 November 1983) is a footballer, who plays for Southern Counties East Football League club Erith & Belvedere.

== Career ==
Hearn started his career at Millwall as a trainee, making 28 League appearances.

He then moved to Northampton Town on loan for a month, in December 2004, the loan was later extended until the end of the season. At the end of the 2004–05 season, Hearn was released from Millwall, the midfielder joined Fisher Athletic.

At the end of the 2006–07 season, new Fisher Athletic manager Wayne Burnett released the entire squad, including Hearn. He was soon signed by his former Fisher manager, Justin Edinburgh for Grays Athletic.

On 1 February 2008, Hearn was sent on a month's loan to Conference South outfit Lewes. He was then sent out on loan again on 13 March 2008 to Ebbsfleet United until the end of the 2007–08 season.

He was released from Grays Athletic at the end of the season along with Nicky Eyre, Danny Knowles, Cameron Mawer and Santos Gaia.

Hearn then moved to Southern Counties East Football League club Beckenham Town in 2008.
