= 2005–06 Gillingham F.C. season =

English football club season

Gillingham
2005–06 season
- Chairman: Paul Scally
- Manager: Neale Cooper (until 15 November); Ronnie Jepson (from 15 November)
- League One: 14th
- FA Cup: First round
- League Cup: Third round
- League Trophy: Second round
- Top goalscorer: League: Darren Byfield (13); All: Darren Byfield (14)
- Highest home attendance: 8,128 (vs Southend United, 1 October 2005)
- Lowest home attendance: 1,988 (vs Crawley Town, 6 December 2005)
Home colours	Away colours

During the 2005–06 English football season, Gillingham F.C. competed in Football League One, the third tier of the English football league system. It was the 74th season in which Gillingham competed in the Football League and the 56th since the club was voted back into the league in 1950. It was Gillingham's first season in the third tier of the English league system since 2000, following the team's relegation from the Football League Championship at the end of the previous season.

Prior to the season, Neale Cooper was appointed as the club's new manager, but after a poor start to the campaign he resigned from the role in mid-November with Gillingham in 22nd place out of 24 teams in the league table, a position which if maintained would result in relegation to Football League Two at the end of the campaign. His assistant, Ronnie Jepson, was appointed on a temporary basis but ultimately remained in the role for the remainder of the season. The team's results quickly improved, and they had climbed to 17th place by the end of 2005. Although a lengthy run without a win in February and March, culminating in a 6–0 defeat to Bristol City, led to Gillingham slipping back to 21st place and once again being in danger of relegation, they then won six consecutive games and ended the season in 14th place.

The club also competed in three knock-out tournaments. In the FA Cup, they were defeated in the first round by Burscough, a team playing in the seventh tier of English football, in what was seen as a shock result. In the Football League Cup, Gillingham defeated Portsmouth of the top-tier FA Premier League before being eliminated in the third round. They also reached the second round of the Football League Trophy. Gillingham played 52 competitive matches, winning 19, drawing 13, and losing 20. Darren Byfield was the team's top goalscorer with 14 goals. Andrew Crofts made the most appearances, missing only one game. The highest attendance recorded at the club's home ground, Priestfield Stadium, was 8,128 for a league game against Southend United in October.

== Background and pre-season ==
The 2005–06 season was Gillingham's 74th season in the Football League and the 56th since the club was re-elected to the League in 1950 after being voted out in 1938. At the end of the previous season, Gillingham had been relegated from the Football League Championship after finishing 22nd out of 24 teams in the league table, ending a five-year spell in the second tier of the English football league system and meaning that they would compete in Football League One, the third tier, in the 2005–06 season.

On 21 May, Neale Cooper was appointed as the club's new manager, replacing Stan Ternent, who had resigned on 15 May. Ronnie Jepson, who had served as assistant manager to Ternent, remained in the role; he had reportedly been considered for the manager's job himself. Bobby Paterson, who had worked with Cooper at the manager's previous club, Hartlepool United, joined Gillingham in the dual roles of director of youth and manager of the reserve team. There was considerable change in Gillingham's playing squad following the club's relegation. Darius Henderson, the team's top goalscorer in the previous season, moved to Watford for a transfer fee of £450,000. Paul Smith, who had been the team's captain during the previous season and played nearly 400 games in eight seasons with Gillingham, left the club after turning down a new contract which would have seen his wages dramatically reduced. Barry Ashby, who had also been with Gillingham for eight years and had made over 300 appearances, left the club at the expiration of his contract, as did Nicky Southall, Nyron Nosworthy, Mamady Sidibé and John Hills, all of whom had been regulars in the team during the previous campaign. Of 12 players whose contracts had expired at the end of the 2004–05 season, only two opted to re-sign with the club.

Cooper signed four new players ahead of the first match of the new season, including two who had last played in his native Scotland: Paul Shields, a forward who joined Gillingham from Forfar Athletic, and Tony Bullock, a goalkeeper who had come to the end of his contract at Dundee United. Shields was still under contract at Forfar; the club had reportedly received interest from at least four clubs for him, but ultimately accepted Gillingham's offer of £25,000 for the player. Tom Williams, a midfielder, and Danny Jackman, a defender, also joined the club, having last played for Barnsley and Stockport County respectively. Gillingham played pre-season friendly matches against Barnet and Millwall; both Bullock and Williams were injured during these matches and missed the start of the league season. Previewing the new League One season, the view of BBC Sport was that Cooper was faced with "an enormous rebuilding task" and that "consolidating in League One may be the most Gillingham fans could dare to hope for." The team's first-choice kit was blue with white trim; the second-choice kit, to be worn in those away games where there was a clash of colours with the home team, was white with blue trim.

== Football League One ==
=== August–December ===
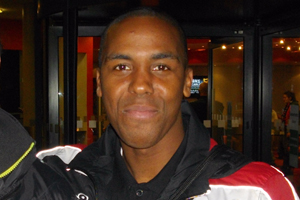
Darren Byfield scored the winning goal on the opening day of the season.

Gillingham began the season with a match at their home ground, Priestfield Stadium, against Colchester United. Jackman was included in the starting line-up and Shields made his debut as a substitute. Colchester took the lead but late goals from Andrew Crofts and Darren Byfield gave Gillingham a 2–1 victory. The team remained unbeaten with draws against Port Vale and Scunthorpe United and a 1–0 victory over AFC Bournemouth. Brent Sancho, a defender who had left Dundee at the end of the previous season, made his debut against Bournemouth. On 27 August, Gillingham played Nottingham Forest at Priestfield; Forest had lost their preceding four games but beat Gillingham 3–1. It was the start of a run of five games for Gillingham which included four defeats. Their final match of August ended in a 1–1 draw with Brentford; Neil Harris, making his debut after joining on loan from Nottingham Forest, scored Gillingham's goal. The team began September with three consecutive defeats in which they scored no goals. The run began when Gillingham lost 3–0 away to Rotherham United on 10 September, all the goals coming in the second half. Three days later, in a game which had been rescheduled due to Crofts, Sancho, and Ian Cox being unavailable on the original date because they were representing their countries in international matches, Gillingham lost by the same score to Barnsley, after which they were booed by their own supporters. The run continued with a 1–0 defeat to Oldham Athletic on 17 September.

After Gillingham twice came from a goal down to secure a 2–2 draw with Tranmere Rovers, they ended their six-game winless run in the league when a goal from Sancho in the final five minutes of the match gave them a 1–0 victory at home to Chesterfield on 27 September. The team's first match of October ended in a 2–1 defeat at Priestfield to Southend United, who had won their previous six games and were in second place in the league table. After a 0–0 draw at home to Yeovil Town on 15 October, Cooper criticised his players in the press, saying "It is all right doing it in training, but you have to have the bottle to come out and play at your ground, especially when things have not been going well". A week later, Gillingham appeared to be heading for another goalless draw but conceded a goal in the final minute of the match and lost 1–0 to Bradford City. In the team's final match of October, Gillingham came from a goal down at half-time to secure a 2–1 victory over Blackpool, but they began November with another defeat, losing 3–1 to Hartlepool United. A 2–0 defeat away to Walsall on 12 November left Gillingham in 22nd place in the league table, a position which if maintained would result in relegation to League Two at the end of the season; three days later Cooper resigned from his position as manager. Paul Scally, the club's chairman, told the press "One or two people need to take a hard look at themselves at this club, as there is no doubt Neale was let down in certain areas." Jepson took over the role, initially on a temporary basis, and told the media that he was confident in his ability to turn the team's results around and keep Gillingham from a second consecutive relegation campaign with the squad of players that he had inherited.

In Jepson's first match in charge, Shields scored his first goal for the team to secure a 1–0 victory over Hartlepool United on 19 November; Byfield made his return to the team in the same game, having been absent for nearly two months due to a knee injury. A week later, Gillingham suffered their heaviest defeat of the season so far, losing 5–0 away to Colchester United. It proved to be the final appearance in the Gillingham goal for Bullock, who had made his delayed debut in October but was replaced by Jason Brown after the severe defeat and was released from his contract in January 2006. Gillingham began December by beating Doncaster Rovers 1–0, and four days later secured a fourth consecutive home league victory when they beat Port Vale 3–0 with one goal from Harris and two from Matt Jarvis. The game marked Andy Hessenthaler's final appearance for Gillingham; he was transferred to Barnet the following month. Hessenthaler had been with the club since 1996, making over 350 appearances and serving as player-manager for much of the club's time in the second tier of English football. Harris scored again a week later to give Gillingham the lead away to AFC Bournemouth but the home team scored two goals, the second in the final minute, to win the match. On 26 December, Gillingham drew 1–1 with Bristol City, and five days later they beat Milton Keynes Dons 3–0 at Priestfield. The result meant that Gillingham were in 17th place out of 24 teams in the League One league table at the end of 2005, having won four out of seven league games since Jepson took over, as many victories as had been achieved in 17 league games during Cooper's time in charge.

=== January–May ===
Michael Flynn scored three goals in the final four games of the season.

Gillingham began the new year with a goalless draw away to Huddersfield Town, and then lost 1–0 away to Barnsley on 10 January. Byfield, who had not played for over a month, was back in the line-up for the latter match. Four days later, he scored the first goal as Gillingham beat Swindon Town 3–0 at Priestfield. A number of fans were arrested and charged with violent disorder as trouble broke out between supporters of the two teams, who share a rivalry. Byfield was required to serve a suspension for the next match due to the number of yellow cards he had received during the season. With injuries meaning that both Shields and Jarvis were also absent, Jepson again included the teenager Akwasi Fobi-Edusei, who had deputised for Byfield the previous month, in the starting line-up against Oldham Athletic on 21 January. Following the game, which Gillingham lost 2–0, the manager described Fobi-Edusei and fellow youngster Gavin Grant, who came on as a substitute, as "not the finished article yet" but noted that "at this moment in time we have no choice, it's all we've got and we have to use those lads." A week later, Grant scored his first goal for the club in a 1–1 draw with Rotherham United. Tommy Black, a midfielder signed on loan from Crystal Palace of the Championship, made his debut in the match. In their final match of January, Gillingham beat Swansea City 2–1, the first time all season that they had won a match away from home. On 4 February, they took the lead against Chesterfield, who had not been beaten in their previous 14 games, but conceded an equalising goal one minute from the end of the match. Gary Mulligan, a forward signed on loan from Sheffield United of the Championship, made his debut in the game.

Gillingham's final three games of February all ended in defeat. On 14 February, they were beaten 1–0 away to Swindon Town; Byfield was sent off, resulting in another suspension, this time for four games. A week later, they lost 2–0 to Doncaster Rovers; BBC Sport described it as a "comfortable victory" over a "sorry" Gillingham team. Although Gillingham took a first-half lead over Scunthorpe United on 25 February, they then conceded three goals and were defeated; Jepson described his team's defending as "so poor, it was untrue". On 11 March, Gillingham held Nottingham Forest to a 1–1 draw despite playing with Danny Spiller and Black, both normally midfielders, in the forward positions due to both Byfield and Harris being suspended. A week later, they suffered their heaviest defeat of the season, losing 6–0 to Bristol City; Gillingham had to play the whole of the second half with only ten men after Leon Johnson was sent off shortly before half-time. The result meant that they had gone seven games without a victory and slipped to 21st place in the league table, one position above the relegation places with nine games remaining. Following the defeat, however, they won their next six matches, one short of the all-time club record for consecutive victories. The run began on 21 March when Gillingham beat Brentford 3–2 despite finishing the game with only nine players after both Alan Pouton and Sean Clohessy were sent off. Four days later, Byfield scored from a penalty kick to secure a 1–0 victory over promotion-chasing Swansea City.

Gillingham's third consecutive victory came on 1 April; Milton Keynes Dons took the lead in the first half, but Byfield equalised after the interval and Black scored three minutes later to give Gillingham a 2–1 victory. A week later, Jarvis set up one goal and scored another as Gillingham beat Huddersfield Town 2–0. He also set up the only goal of the game on 14 April as Black scored to give Gillingham a 1–0 victory away to Southend United, who were in first place in the league table and had been unbeaten in their previous 11 games at home. On 17 April, it was announced that several weeks earlier Jepson had been given a contract to remain manager for the rest of the season and for two further years. On the same day, his team beat Bradford City 2–1 at Priestfield with goals from Michael Flynn and Black, a result which took them up to 11th place in the league table, their highest position since September. Both players scored again against Yeovil Town on 22 April, but the winning run came to an end as Yeovil were 4–1 in the lead by the 60-minute mark and survived a late Gillingham rally to win 4–3. The last match of the season at Priestfield Stadium ended in a 1–0 victory for Walsall; Steve Claridge, who had spent a brief spell with Gillingham earlier in the season, scored the winning goal. Gillingham's final game of the season was away to Blackpool, who needed to secure at least a draw to avoid relegation. After Gillingham fell a goal behind, Byfield scored twice to put his team in the lead. Blackpool scored two goals to retake the lead, but Flynn scored inside the final five minutes and the game finished 3–3. The result meant that Gillingham finished the season in 14th place in the league table.

=== League match details ===
Key

- In result column, Gillingham's score shown first
- H = Home match
- A = Away match
- pen. = Penalty kick
- o.g. = Own goal

Results
Date	Opponents	Result	Goalscorers	Attendance
6 August 2005	Colchester United (H)	2–1	Crofts, Byfield	7,293
9 August 2005	Port Vale (A)	0–0		4,931
13 August 2005	Scunthorpe United (A)	1–1	Hessenthaler	5,007
20 August 2005	AFC Bournemouth (H)	1–0	Browning (o.g.)	6,568
27 August 2005	Nottingham Forest (H)	1–3	Byfield	7,228
29 August 2005	Brentford (A)	1–1	Harris	6,969
10 September 2005	Rotherham United (A)	0–3		4,253
13 September 2005	Barnsley (H)	0–3		5,283
17 September 2005	Oldham Athletic (H)	0–1		6,259
24 September 2005	Tranmere Rovers (A)	2–2	Byfield (2, 1 pen.)	7,003
27 September 2005	Chesterfield (H)	1–0	Sancho	7,472
1 October 2005	Southend United (H)	1–2	Pouton	8,128
15 October 2005	Yeovil Town (H)	0–0		6,848
22 October 2005	Bradford City (A)	0–1		7,729
29 October 2005	Blackpool (H)	2–1	Hope, Harris	6,300
1 November 2005	Hartlepool United (A)	1–3	Collin	4,522
12 November 2005	Walsall (A)	0–2		4,785
19 November 2005	Hartlepool United (H)	1–0	Shields	6,092
26 November 2005	Colchester United (A)	0–5		3,801
6 December 2005	Doncaster Rovers (H)	1–0	Flynn	4,861
10 December 2005	Port Vale (H)	3–0	Harris, Jarvis (2)	6,210
17 December 2005	AFC Bournemouth (A)	1–2	Harris	6,177
26 December 2005	Bristol City (H)	1–1	Flynn	7,786
31 December 2005	Milton Keynes Dons (H)	3–0	Johnson, Clohessy, Pouton	6,012
2 January 2006	Huddersfield Town (A)	0–0		11,483
10 January 2006	Barnsley (A)	0–1		7,090
14 January 2006	Swindon Town (H)	3–0	Byfield, Flynn, Harris	7,300
21 January 2006	Oldham Athletic (A)	0–2		5,783
28 January 2006	Rotherham United (H)	1–1	Grant	6,107
31 January 2006	Swansea City (A)	2–1	Byfield, Harris	14,357
4 February 2006	Chesterfield (A)	1–1	Black	4,652
11 February 2006	Tranmere Rovers (H)	1–1	Byfield	6,803
14 February 2006	Swindon Town (A)	0–1		5,530
18 February 2006	Doncaster Rovers (A)	0–2		5,738
25 February 2006	Scunthorpe United (H)	1–3	Cochrane	6,029
11 March 2006	Nottingham Forest (A)	1–1	Bennett (o.g.)	19,446
18 March 2006	Bristol City (A)	0–6		10,932
21 March 2006	Brentford (H)	3–2	Sancho, Byfield (2, 1 pen.)	5,745
25 March 2006	Swansea City (H)	1–0	Byfield (pen.)	6,909
1 April 2006	Milton Keynes Dons (A)	2–1	Byfield, Black	6,432
8 April 2006	Huddersfield Town (H)	2–0	Mulligan, Jarvis	7,014
14 April 2006	Southend United (A)	1–0	Black	11,195
17 April 2006	Bradford City (H)	2–1	Black, Flynn	7,281
22 April 2006	Yeovil Town (A)	3–4	Black, Flynn, Crofts	6,040
29 April 2006	Walsall (H)	0–1		7,757
6 May 2006	Blackpool (A)	3–3	Byfield (2), Flynn	8,541

=== Partial league table ===
Football League One final table, positions 12–16
Pos	Team	Pld	W	D	L	GF	GA	GD	Pts
12	Scunthorpe United	46	15	15	16	68	73	−5	60
13	Port Vale	46	16	12	18	49	54	−5	60
14	Gillingham	46	16	12	18	50	64	−14	60
15	Yeovil Town	46	15	11	20	54	62	−8	56
16	Chesterfield	46	14	14	18	63	73	−10	56

== Cup matches ==
=== FA Cup ===
As a League One team, Gillingham entered the 2005–06 FA Cup at the first round stage; they were drawn to play Burscough of the Northern Premier League Premier Division, the seventh tier of the English football league system. Burscough had entered at the first qualifying round and won four matches to reach the first round proper. Gillingham conceded an early goal but then scored twice to take the lead. The score remained 2–1 until the final minute when Burscough equalised, and they then scored again in injury time to win 3–2 and eliminate Gillingham from the competition, in what BBC Sport described as the biggest shock of the round. A book on the history of the club published in 2009 described it as the most humiliating FA Cup defeat in Gillingham's history.

==== FA Cup match details ====
Key

- In result column, Gillingham's score shown first
- H = Home match
- A = Away match
- pen. = Penalty kick
- o.g. = Own goal

Results
Date	Round	Opponents	Result	Goalscorers	Attendance
5 November 2005	First	Burscough (A)	2–3	Jarvis, Saunders	1,927

=== Football League Cup ===
As a League One team, Gillingham entered the 2005–06 Football League Cup at the first round stage; their opponents were Oxford United of League Two. A goal in the final ten minutes of the game from Jarvis gave Gillingham a 1–0 victory and took them into the second round where they were drawn to play Portsmouth of the top-tier FA Premier League. Twice Portsmouth took the lead only for Gillingham to equalise; Gillingham's first goal came when Byfield capitalised on an error in the Portsmouth defence, and the second resulted from a shot by Byfield hitting the goalpost before ricocheting off Portsmouth's goalkeeper, Jamie Ashdown, into the goal. The scores were level after 90 minutes, so under the rules of the competition 30 minutes of extra time were played. During the additional period, Portsmouth were awarded a penalty kick but Svetoslav Todorov missed; Crofts then scored a goal to give Gillingham a 3–2 victory. Cooper told the media "I was very impressed by their start. They were so quick and we had to show a lot of character to come back. But we finished the stronger team and I'm delighted." Gillingham's opponents in the third round were fellow League One team Doncaster Rovers. The game remained scoreless until the final six minutes but Doncaster then scored twice to win the match and eliminate Gillingham.

==== League Cup match details ====
Key

- In result column, Gillingham's score shown first
- H = Home match
- A = Away match
- pen. = Penalty kick
- o.g. = Own goal

Results
Date	Round	Opponents	Result	Goalscorers	Attendance
23 August 2005	First	Oxford United (H)	1–0	Jarvis	4,149
20 September 2005	Second	Portsmouth (H)	3–2 (a.e.t.)	Byfield, Ashdown (o.g.), Crofts	4,903
25 October 2005	Third	Doncaster Rovers (A)	0–2		6,874

=== Football League Trophy ===
Gillingham entered the 2005–06 Football League Trophy at the first round stage; the competition involved the teams in League One and League Two plus selected teams from the Conference National, the tier below League Two. In the first round, Gillingham played Crawley Town of the Conference National in a match which drew a crowd of only 1,988, the lowest of the season at Priestfield Stadium. The match was goalless at the end of the regulation 90 minutes, so extra time was played and Gillingham scored twice in the additional period to win the game. In the second round, they played Wycombe Wanderers of League Two; Jarvis scored two goals to give Gillingham a 2–0 lead, but Wycombe brought the scores level by the half-time interval. There were no further goals in the second half or in extra time, so a penalty shoot-out was required to determine which team would progress to the next round. Wycombe won the shoot-out 3–1, and Gillingham were eliminated from the competition.

==== League Cup match details ====
Key

- In result column, Gillingham's score shown first
- H = Home match
- A = Away match
- pen. = Penalty kick
- o.g. = Own goal

Results
Date	Round	Opponents	Result	Goalscorers	Attendance
18 October 2005	First	Crawley Town (H)	2–0 (a.e.t.)	Jackman, Collin	1,988
22 November 2005	Second	Wycombe Wanderers (H)	2–2 (a.e.t.)	Jarvis (2)	2,111

== Players ==
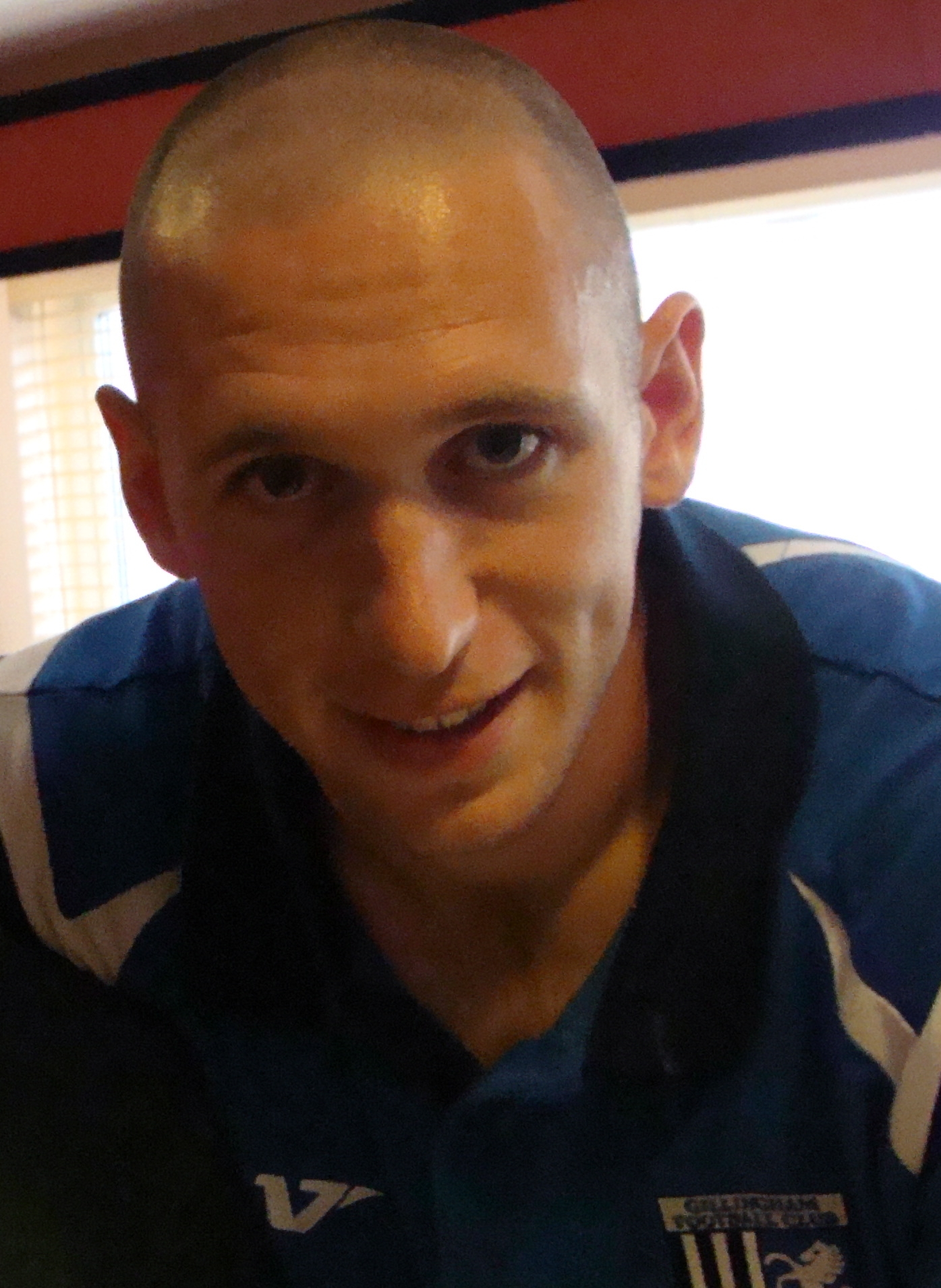
Andrew Crofts made the most appearances during the season.

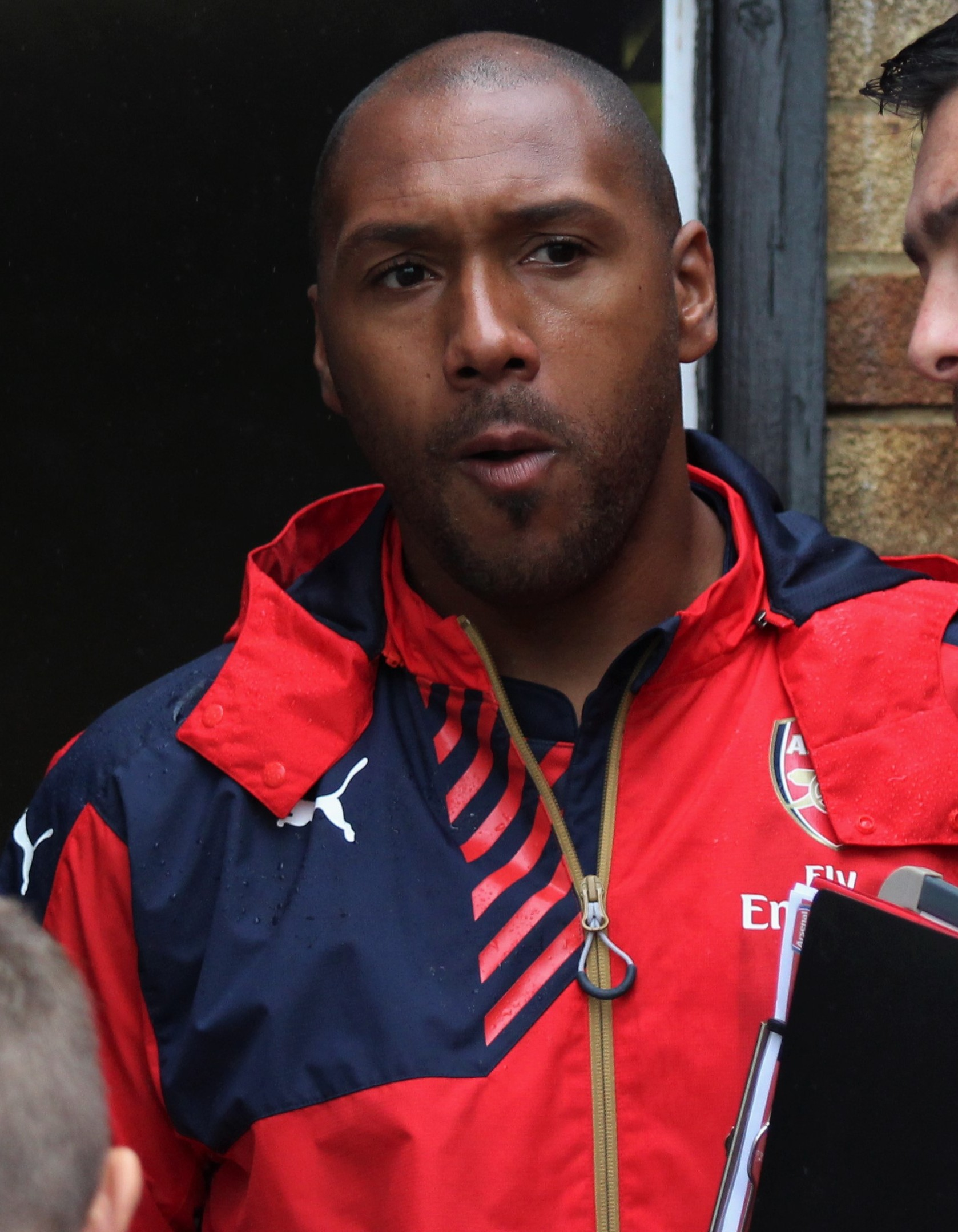
Jason Brown played 41 times in goal.

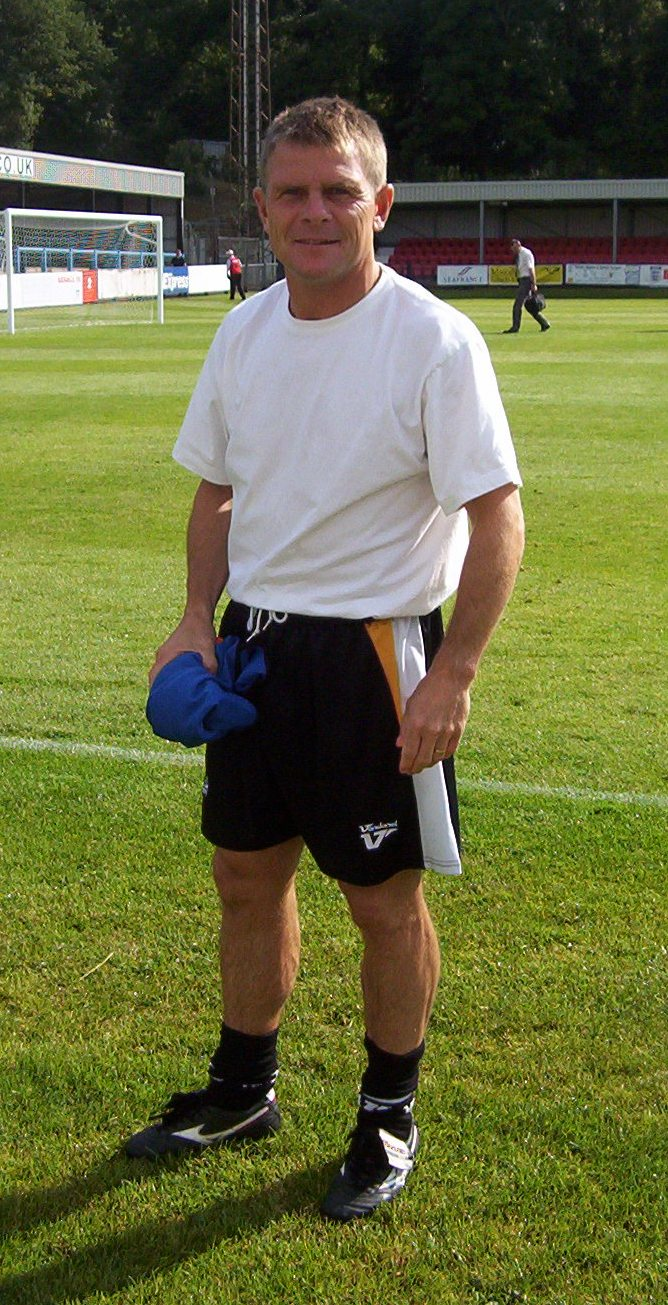
Andy Hessenthaler, who had been with the club since 1996, played his final game for Gillingham in December.

During the season, 34 players made at least one appearance for Gillingham. Crofts made the most appearances, missing only one of the team's 52 games. Jackman played 47 times and Brown, Jarvis, Cox, and Flynn all made at least 40 appearances. Five players each played fewer than five times, with Paul Crichton the only player to make just a single appearance. Byfield was the team's top goalscorer with 14 goals, the most scored by a Gillingham player in a season since the 2001–02 campaign. No other player scored more than seven times. Brown won the club's player of the year award.

Player statistics
No.	Player	Position	League One		FA Cup		League Cup		League Trophy		Total	
No.	Player	Position	Apps	Goals	Apps	Goals	Apps	Goals	Apps	Goals	Apps	Goals
1	Paul Crichton	GK	1	0	0	0	0	0	0	0	1	0
3	Tom Williams	DF	13	0	1	0	2	0	2	0	18	0
4	Paul Smith	MF	3	0	1	0	0	0	1	0	5	0
4^{[a]}	Justin Cochrane	DF	5	1	0	0	0	0	0	0	5	1
5	Brent Sancho	DF	19	2	0	0	2	0	0	0	21	2
6	Ian Cox	DF	36	0	1	0	2	0	1	0	40	0
7	Andrew Crofts	MF	45	2	1	0	3	1	2	0	51	3
8	Andy Hessenthaler	MF	16	1	1	0	3	0	1	0	21	1
8^{[a]}	Tommy Black	MF	17	5	0	0	0	0	0	0	17	5
9	Steven Hislop	FW	8	0	0	0	2	0	1	0	11	0
9^{[a]}	Gary Mulligan	FW	13	1	0	0	0	0	0	0	13	1
10	Michael Flynn	MF	36	6	1	0	3	0	0	0	40	6
11	Danny Jackman	DF	42	0	0	0	3	0	2	1	47	1
13	Jason Brown	GK	39	0	0	0	2	0	0	0	41	0
14	Leon Johnson	DF	28	1	0	0	1	0	1	0	30	1
15	Mark Saunders	MF	4	0	1	1	1	0	1	0	7	1
16	Richard Rose	DF	14	0	0	0	2	0	1	0	17	0
17	Tony Bullock	GK	6	0	1	0	1	0	2	0	10	0
18	Chris Hope	DF	24	1	1	0	3	0	1	0	29	1
19	Neil Harris	FW	36	6	1	0	0	0	2	0	39	6
20	Darren Byfield	FW	29	13	0	0	2	1	1	0	32	14
21	Matt Jarvis	MF	35	3	1	1	3	1	2	2	41	7
22	Danny Spiller	MF	32	0	0	0	0	0	2	0	34	0
23	Jon Wallis	MF	17	0	1	0	1	0	1	0	20	0
24	Mark Corneille	DF	2	0	0	0	1	0	1	0	4	0
25	Alan Pouton	MF	23	2	0	0	1	0	0	0	24	2
26	Paul Shields	FW	17	1	0	0	1	0	1	0	19	1
27	Moses Ashikodi	FW	4	0	0	0	0	0	0	0	4	0
28	Steve Claridge	FW	1	0	0	0	1	0	0	0	2	0
28^{[a]}	Frannie Collin	FW	6	1	1	0	1	0	1	1	9	2
29	Craig Stone	MF	3	0	0	0	0	0	0	0	3	0
30	Sean Clohessy	DF	20	1	0	0	0	0	1	0	21	1
31	Akwasi Fobi-Edusei	FW	6	0	0	0	0	0	0	0	6	0
32	Gavin Grant	FW	10	1	0	0	0	0	0	0	10	1

FW = Forward, MF = Midfielder, GK = Goalkeeper, DF = Defender

a. Cochrane, Black, Mulligan and Collin were each allocated a squad number which had been worn earlier in the season by a player who had since left the club.

== Aftermath ==
Jepson was keen to re-sign Byfield when the player's contract expired at the end of the season, but Byfield opted to sign for Millwall. Brown also moved on, bringing an end to a Gillingham career during which he had made over 120 appearances. Jepson signed replacement players, including Kelvin Jack, who had played for Trinidad and Tobago in the 2006 FIFA World Cup, but Gillingham performed poorly again in the 2006–07 season, finishing 16th in the league table. After Gillingham lost five of their first six games of the 2007–08 season Jepson resigned, and his replacement Mark Stimson was unable to prevent the team's relegation to League Two at the end of the campaign.
