= Corneille (name) =

Corneille is a given name and surname. Notable people with the name include:

== Given name ==
- Corneille of Berghes (1490?–1560?), Prince-bishop of Liège
- Corneille of Burgundy (1420–1452), an illegitimate son of Philip the Good, Duke of Burgundy
- Corneille de Lyon (died 1575), Dutch portrait painter
- Corneille Guillaume Beverloo (1922–2010), Dutch painter
- Corneille Cacheux (1687–1738), French pipe-organ maker
- Corneille Ewango, Congolese environmentalist
- Corneille Heymans (1892–1968), Belgian physiologist

== Surname ==
- Marcelle Corneille (1923–2019), Canadian administrator and educator
- Mark Corneille (born 1986), English footballer
- Michel Corneille the Elder (c. 1601 – 1664), French painter, etcher, and engraver
- Michel Corneille the Younger (1642–1708), French painter, etcher and engraver, son of the above
- Pierre Corneille (1606–1684), French dramatist
- Thomas Corneille (1625–1709), French dramatist

== Stage name ==
- Corneille (singer), stage name of Rwandan–Canadian rhythm and blues singer Cornelius Nyungura (born 1977)

== See also ==
- Lycée Corneille (disambiguation), schools
- Corneille Island, Australia
