= List of Dover Athletic F.C. seasons =

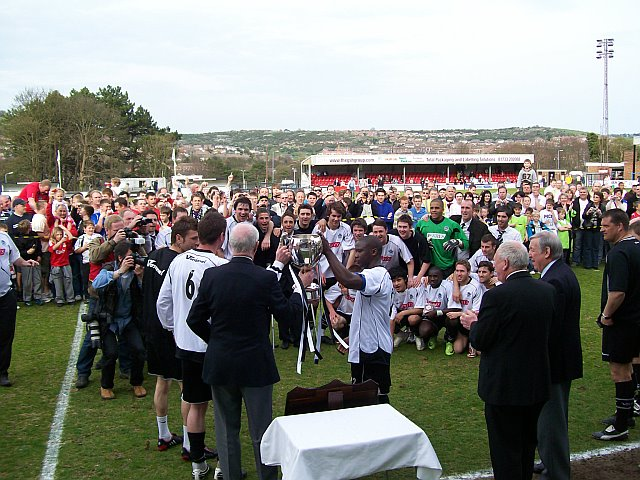
Dover receive the Isthmian League championship trophy in 2009

This is a list of seasons played by Dover Athletic F.C. in English football, from the club's formation to the most recent completed season. It details the club's achievements in all major and some minor competitions, and the top scorers for each season where known.

Dover Athletic F.C. was formed in 1983 after the dissolution of the town's previous club, Dover F.C., whose place in the Southern League was taken by the new club. In the 1989–90 season Dover Athletic won the Southern League championship, but failed to gain promotion to the Football Conference due to ground grading issues. Three seasons later the team won this title again and this time gained promotion to the Conference, where they spent nine seasons before being relegated.

The club's best performance in the FA Cup was an appearance in the Third Round proper in both the 2010–11 and the 2014–15 season, while the best performance registered in the FA Trophy, the national competition for higher-level non-league clubs, was a run to the semi-finals in the 1997–98 season.

== Seasons ==
| Season | League | | | | | | | | | FA Cup | FA Trophy | Other competitions | Top scorer | |
| Season | Division | P | W | D | L | F | A | Pts | Pos | FA Cup | FA Trophy | Other competitions | Top scorer | |
|---|---|---|---|---|---|---|---|---|---|---|---|---|---|---|
| 1983–84 | SLS | 38 | 12 | 9 | 17 | 51 | 74 | 45 | 13th | R1Q | RP | SLC R1 | | |
| 1984–85 | SLS | 38 | 7 | 7 | 24 | 39 | 78 | 28 | 19th | R2Q | RP | SLC R? | | |
| 1985–86 | SLS | 40 | 23 | 6 | 11 | 89 | 53 | 75 | 4th | RP | R1Q | EFC R? | | |
| 1986–87 | SLS | 38 | 20 | 6 | 12 | 66 | 43 | 66 | 5th | R4Q | R2Q | SLC R2 | | |
| 1987–88 | SLS | 40 | 28 | 10 | 2 | 81 | 28 | 94 | 1st | R1Q | R1Q | | | |
| 1988–89 | SLP | 42 | 19 | 12 | 11 | 65 | 47 | 69 | 6th | R4Q | R2 | SLC R4 | | |
| 1989–90 | SLP | 42 | 32 | 6 | 4 | 87 | 27 | 102 | 1st | R3Q | R3 | SLC R2 | | |
| 1990–91 | SLP | 42 | 21 | 11 | 10 | 56 | 37 | 74 | 4th | R4Q | R2 | KSC Winners | | |
| 1991–92 | SLP | 42 | 23 | 15 | 4 | 66 | 30 | 84 | 2nd | R4Q | R1 | | | |
| 1992–93 | SLP | 40 | 25 | 11 | 4 | 65 | 23 | 86 | 1st | R3Q | R2 | | | |
| 1993–94 | Conf | 42 | 17 | 7 | 18 | 48 | 49 | 58 | 8th | R1Q | R3 | KSC Runners-up | | |
| 1994–95 | Conf | 42 | 11 | 16 | 15 | 48 | 55 | 49 | 16th | R4Q | R1 | | | |
| 1995–96 | Conf | 42 | 11 | 7 | 24 | 51 | 74 | 40 | 20th | R1Q | R2 | | | |
| 1996–97 | Conf | 42 | 12 | 14 | 16 | 57 | 68 | 50 | 17th | R3Q | R1 | | | |
| 1997–98 | Conf | 42 | 15 | 10 | 17 | 60 | 70 | 55 | 13th | R3Q | SF | | | |
| 1998–99 | Conf | 42 | 15 | 13 | 14 | 54 | 48 | 58 | 11th | R4Q | R3 | | | |
| 1999–00 | Conf | 42 | 18 | 12 | 12 | 65 | 56 | 66 | 6th | R4Q | R5 | CLC R1; KSC SF | Joff Vansittart | 19 |
| 2000–01 | Conf | 42 | 14 | 11 | 17 | 54 | 56 | 53 | 15th | R4Q | R3 | FLT R1S; CLC R2; KSC Runners-up | Joff Vansittart | 14 |
| 2001–02 | Conf | 42 | 11 | 6 | 25 | 41 | 65 | 39 | 22nd | R4Q | R3 | KSC QF | Keith Scott | 14 |
| 2002–03 | SLP | 42 | 19 | 14 | 9 | 42 | 35 | 71 | 3rd | R1 | R5 | SLC R3; KSC R1 | Jamie Day; Tommy Tyne | 11 |
| 2003–04 | SLP | 42 | 12 | 13 | 17 | 50 | 59 | 49 | 19th | R3Q | R5 | SLC QF; KSC SF | Craig Wilkins | 20 |
| 2004–05 | IsP | 42 | 10 | 9 | 23 | 50 | 66 | 39 | 21st | R1Q | R1 | ILC R3; KSC Runners-up | Craig Cloke | 9 |
| 2005–06 | Is1 | 44 | 21 | 14 | 9 | 69 | 46 | 77 | 5th | R2Q | R1Q | ILC R4; KSC QF | Craig Wilkins | 19 |
| 2006–07 | Is1S | 42 | 22 | 11 | 9 | 77 | 41 | 77 | 3rd | R4Q | R1Q | ILC Runners-up; KSC QF | Jimmy Dryden | 17 |
| 2007–08 | Is1S | 42 | 30 | 8 | 4 | 84 | 29 | 98 | 1st | R2Q | R3Q | ILC R2; KSC R1 | Francis Collin | 21 |
| 2008–09 | IsP | 42 | 33 | 5 | 4 | 91 | 34 | 104 | 1st | R3Q | R2Q | ILC QF; KSC R1 | Francis Collin | 24 |
| 2009–10 | ConfS | 42 | 22 | 9 | 11 | 66 | 47 | 75 | 2nd | R4Q | R3 | KSC tbc | Adam Birchall | 18 |
| 2010–11 | ConfS | 42 | 22 | 8 | 12 | 80 | 51 | 74 | 7th | R3 | R3Q | KSC tbc | Adam Birchall | 45 |
| 2011–12 | ConfS | 42 | 17 | 15 | 10 | 62 | 49 | 66 | 7th | R4Q | R3Q | KSC SF | Billy Bricknell | 16 |
| 2012–13 | ConfS | 42 | 22 | 10 | 10 | 69 | 44 | 76 | 3rd | R3Q | R3Q | KSC | | |
| 2013–14 | ConfS | 42 | 20 | 9 | 13 | 63 | 38 | 69 | 5th | R2 | R3 | KSC | | |
| 2014–15 | ConfP | 46 | 19 | 11 | 16 | 69 | 58 | 68 | 8th | R3 | R4 | KSC R2 | Stefan Payne | 20 |
| 2015–16 | Natl | 46 | 23 | 11 | 12 | 75 | 53 | 80 | 5th | R1 | R4 | | | |
| 2016–17 | Natl | 46 | 24 | 7 | 15 | 85 | 63 | 79 | 6th | R1 | R1 | KSC Winners | Ricky Miller | 45 |
| 2017–18 | Natl | 46 | 20 | 13 | 13 | 62 | 44 | 73 | 8th | R4Q | R3 | KSC R2 | Ryan Bird | 20 |
| 2018–19 | Natl | 46 | 16 | 12 | 18 | 58 | 64 | 60 | 14th | R1 | R2 | KSC R2 | Inih Effiong | 11 |
| 2019–20 | Natl | 38 | 15 | 9 | 14 | 49 | 49 | 54 | 11th | R2 | R1 | KSC QF | Inih Effiong | 16 |
| 2020–21 | Natl | 0 | 0 | 0 | 0 | 0 | 0 | 0 | N/A | R4Q | R3 | N/A | | |
| 2021–22 | Natl | 42 | 2 | 7 | 35 | 37 | 101 | 1 | 23rd | R4Q | R3 | KSC R2 | Alfie Pavey | 6 |
| 2022–23 | NatlS | 46 | 12 | 12 | 22 | 42 | 68 | 48 | 20th | R2Q | R2 | KSC R2 | Luke Wanadio | 10 |
| 2023–24 | NatlS | 46 | 4 | 15 | 27 | 40 | 77 | 27 | 24th | R4Q | R2 | KSC R2 | Zidan Sutherland | 5 |
| 2024–25 | IsP | 42 | 23 | 7 | 12 | 83 | 48 | 76 | 5th | R1Q | R1 | KSC SF | George Nikaj | 25 |
| 2025–26 | NatlS | 46 | 13 | 11 | 22 | 60 | 75 | 50 | 20th | R2Q | R3 | KSC SF | George Nikaj | 15 |

== Key ==
| Winners | Runners up | Promoted | Relegated |

Division shown in bold when it changes due to promotion, relegation or league reorganisation.

**Key to league record**
P – games played
W – games won
D – games drawn
L – games lost
F – goals for
A – goals against
Pts – points
Pos – final position

**Key to rounds**
Grp – group stage
R1Q – first qualifying round
R2Q – second qualifying round, etc.
RP – preliminary round
R1 – first round
R2 – second round, etc.
R1S – first round (south)
QF – quarter-final
SF – semi-final
n/a – not applicable

**Key to divisions**
Conf/ConfP/Natl – National League (known as Football Conference until 2004 and Conference Premier 2004–2016)
ConfS/NatlS – National League South (known as Conference South until 2016)
IsP – Isthmian League Premier Division
Is1 – Isthmian League First Division
Is1S – Isthmian League Division One South
SLP – Southern League Premier Division
SLS – Southern League Southern Division

**Key to cups**
CLC – Conference League Cup
EFC – Eastern Floodlit Cup
FLT – Football League Trophy
ILC – Isthmian League Cup
KSC – Kent Senior Cup
SLC – Southern League Cup
