= Edusei =

Edusei is a Ghanaian surname. Notable people with the surname include:

- Akwasi Fobi-Edusei (born 1986), English footballer
- Daniel Edusei (born 1980), Ghanaian footballer
- Kevin John Edusei (born 1976), German conductor
- Mark Edusei (born 1976), Ghanaian footballer
