= Jason Brown (footballer) =

English footballer (born 1982)

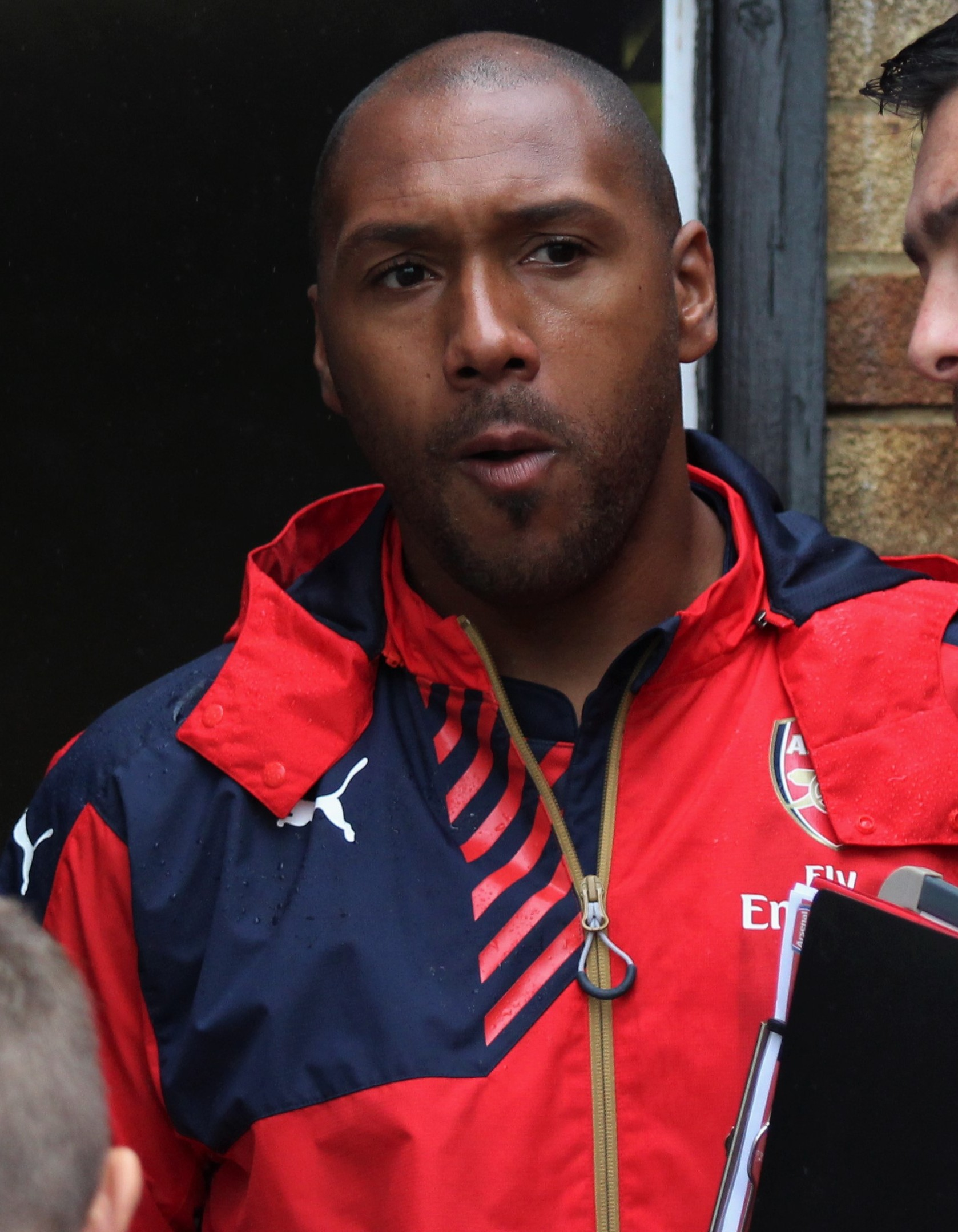
- Brown coaching Arsenal Ladies in 2015

Personal information
- Full name: Jason Roy Brown
- Date of birth: 18 May 1982 (age 44)
- Place of birth: Bermondsey, England
- Height: 5 ft 11 in (1.80 m)
- Position: Goalkeeper

Youth career
- –1997: Fisher Athletic
- 1997–1998: Sydenham
- 1998–2000: Charlton Athletic

Senior career*
Years	Team	Apps	(Gls)
2000–2001	Charlton Athletic	0	(0)
2001–2006	Gillingham	126	(0)
2006–2011	Blackburn Rovers	9	(0)
2010	→ Leeds United (loan)	4	(0)
2010	→ Leyton Orient (loan)	3	(0)
2011	→ Cardiff City (loan)	0	(0)
2011–2013	Aberdeen	22	(0)
2013	Ipswich Town	0	(0)
2013–2014	Cambridge United	0	(0)
2014	Sutton United	21	(0)
2014–2015	Dartford	30	(0)
2015	Sutton United	0	(0)
Total		215	(0)

International career
2002–2004	Wales U21	7	(0)
2006–2012	Wales	3	(0)

Managerial career
- 2018–2019: Air Force Central
- * Club domestic league appearances and goals

Jason Roy Brown (born 18 May 1982) is a former professional footballer who played as a goalkeeper. He began his career at Gillingham where he made over 100 appearances, before joining up with Premier League side Blackburn Rovers in 2006. Born in England, was capped three times for Wales after making his debut in 2006.

== Early life ==
Born in Bermondsey in Southwark, England, Brown attended Riverside Primary School and Deptford Green School as a youngster.

== Club career ==
=== Charlton Athletic ===
Brown began his career playing youth football as a defender for Fisher Athletic before converting to a goalkeeper at the age of 14. He later played one season for Sydenham, winning a local league and cup double. During this season the side conceded just four goals during their campaign, with him featuring alongside Anwar Uddin and Terrell Forbes. His performances attracted the attention of several London based clubs, including Fulham and Queens Park Rangers. He eventually signed for Charlton Athletic after two of his friends also joined up with the club. Brown struggled as an apprentice during his first season at The Valley, suffering home sickness and later rupturing his hamstring. This injury kept him out of the team for several months but he was able to return to action the following year after training alongside first team goalkeeper Mike Salmon.

In his second year at the club he was more successful, as he became a regular in the club's academy teams and with the first team he trained one-on-one with new signing Dean Kiely. Charlton coach Gary Stevens later told Brown that "a year ago you were a waste of space, but you've come on and proved a lot of people wrong". At the end of his apprenticeship, Brown was offered a one-year professional contract with the club for the 2000–01 season. However, he struggled to make an impact on the squad with four other senior goalkeepers in the team. As so he entered into talks with club manager Alan Curbishley who believed that he wouldn't continually improve as a player and thus offered to help him find a new club. Concerned about his footballing future, Brown looked for jobs elsewhere. After being recommended by Dean Kiely to Sheffield United's assistant manager Kevin Blackwell, Brown earned a trial at Bramall Lane. With the club he then featured in a friendly game against Wolverhampton Wanderers. However, Brown eventually wasn't offered a contract as Warnock was looking for a more experienced alternative to first choice goalkeeper Simon Tracey.

=== Gillingham ===
After being rejected by Sheffield United, Brown was invited to a trial by Gillingham chief scout, Bernie Dillon. During the trial he played in seven youth fixtures and one reserve match for the club and was eventually handed a two-and-a-half-year contract at the Priestfield Stadium. After regularly appearing upon the bench, Brown was handed his senior debut on 5 March 2002, where he played the full 90 minutes of a 2–1 victory over Grimsby Town. His performance in the following match, a 0–0 draw with Sheffield Wednesday, saw him named in the Division One team of the week. Brown was voted as Gillingham's player of the year for his performances during the 2005–06 season.

=== Blackburn Rovers ===
The following month, Brown signed for Premier League side Blackburn Rovers on a four-year deal.

On 11 September 2010, Brown signed for Leeds United on an initial one-month loan after an injury to Kasper Schmeichel. He made his Leeds debut as a substitute against Ipswich Town on 2 October after Shane Higgs got injured. After such Brown's loan was extended by another month. On 5 October, Brown revealed an interest in joining Leeds on a permanent basis. Brown made his first start for Leeds against Middlesbrough. His loan came to an end on 15 November.

On 19 November 2010, Brown signed for Leyton Orient on a one-month loan. On 23 November 2010 he saved an Aaron McLean penalty to help his side secure a 2–2 draw at Peterborough United. On 3 March 2011, he joined Championship side Cardiff City on an emergency loan deal, after injuries to Cardiff's goalkeepers David Marshall and Tom Heaton. The following day, Stephen Bywater also joined on loan, and kept Brown out of the side, but despite not making an appearance during his initial spell, Cardiff decided to extend his loan until the end of the season.

=== Aberdeen ===
On 20 July 2011, Brown joined Scottish Premier League club Aberdeen on a free transfer .

Mid-way through the season first-choice goalkeeper David Gonzalez began to fall out of favour with manager Craig Brown, and with Jamie Langfield still recovering from a seizure suffered in the previous season, Brown was handed the starting position on a regular basis. He went on to make a further 24 appearances in the 2011–12 season. In a Scottish Cup quarter-final away to Motherwell, he saved a Michael Higdon penalty as the Dons won 2–1. On 29 January 2013, Brown was released by Aberdeen.

=== Later career ===
Brown joined Ipswich Town on a short-term deal on 28 March 2013. After this, and a short spell with Cambridge United, he next played for Sutton United. However, he left the club following their playoff semi-final exit at the hands of Dover Athletic.

On 23 June 2014, Brown signed for Conference Premier side Dartford. Brown left Dartford on 28 April 2015 following the end of the 2014–15 season and re-signed for Sutton United, but left before the start of the season to return to Gillingham as a goalkeeping coach. Brown retired from football at the age of 33 in the summer of 2015.

== International career ==
Born in England, Brown qualified to play for Wales due to a Welsh-born grandmother. Brown's first cap for Wales Under-21s came in a 2–1 defeat to Finland in a 2004 UEFA European Under-21 Championships qualifying group stage game. In 2003 Brown was named as Young Welsh Footballer of the Year by the FAW.

Brown was first named in the senior Wales squad for friendlies against a Basque XI and Trinidad & Tobago in May 2006, although he ended up pulling out of the first match due to the birth of his first child. He made his senior debut in the friendly against Trinidad and Tobago on 27 May 2006, in a 2–1 victory for Wales. He gained his second cap later on in the year, when Wales took on European minnows Liechtenstein, keeping a clean sheet in a 4–0 victory. Brown would then wait another six years for his third and final senior cap which came in Chris Coleman's first game in charge as Wales manager. The game ended in a 2–0 defeat against Mexico with goals from Aldo de Nigris either side of half-time.

== Coaching career ==
Brown retired from playing at the end of the 2014–15 season to take up the goalkeeping coach position at former club Gillingham in the summer of 2015. However, he left the club soon after to assume the role of a goalkeeping coach at Arsenal Ladies. This was followed by a move to Thai side Air Force Central as goalkeeping coach. He became caretaker manager in June 2018, after the resignation of Andrew Ord. The appointment was made permanent shortly afterwards, with Brown signing a contract until 2019, but he was unable to prevent the team's relegation to Thai League 2. He had previously worked as a goalkeeping coach with the Bangladesh and Vietnam national teams.

== Personal life ==
In April 2003, Brown married his girlfriend Amera. As of 2012 he had two children.

== Career statistics ==
=== Club ===
Appearances and goals by club, season and competition
Club	Season	League			National cup (Note: Includes FA Cup, Scottish Cup)		League cup (Note: Includes League Cup, Scottish League Cup)		Other		Total	
Club	Season	Division	Apps	Goals	Apps	Goals	Apps	Goals	Apps	Goals	Apps	Goals
Gillingham	2001–02	First Division	10	0	0	0	0	0	—		10	0
Gillingham	2002–03	First Division	39	0	3	0	2	0	—		44	0
Gillingham	2003–04	First Division	22	0	0	0	3	0	—		25	0
Gillingham	2004–05	Championship	16	0	0	0	1	0	—		17	0
Gillingham	2005–06	League One	39	0	0	0	2	0	0	0	41	0
Gillingham	Total		126	0	3	0	8	0	0	0	137	0
Blackburn Rovers	2006–07	Premier League	1	0	0	0	0	0	0	0	1	0
Blackburn Rovers	2007–08	Premier League	0	0	0	0	0	0	0	0	0	0
Blackburn Rovers	2008–09	Premier League	4	0	1	0	2	0	—		7	0
Blackburn Rovers	2009–10	Premier League	4	0	1	0	3	0	—		8	0
Blackburn Rovers	Total		9	0	2	0	5	0	0	0	16	0
Leeds United (loan)	2010–11	Championship	4	0	0	0	0	0	—		4	0
Leyton Orient (loan)	2010–11	League One	3	0	2	0	0	0	0	0	5	0
Aberdeen	2011–12	Scottish Premier League	20	0	5	0	1	0	—		26	0
Aberdeen	2012–13	Scottish Premier League	2	0	0	0	0	0	—		2	0
Aberdeen	Total		22	0	5	0	1	0	—		28	0
Ipswich Town	2012–13	Championship	0	0	0	0	0	0	—		0	0
Cambridge United	2013–14	Conference Premier	0	0	0	0	—		2 (Note: Appearances in FA Trophy)	0	2	0
Sutton United	2013–14	Conference South	21	0	0	0	—		2 (Note: Appearances in Conference South play-offs)	0	23	0
Dartford	2014–15	Conference Premier	30	0	3	0	—		3	0	36	0
Sutton United	2015–16	Conference South	0	0	0	0	—		0	0	0	0
Career total			215	0	15	0	14	0	7	0	251	0

=== International ===
Appearances and goals by national team and year
National team	Year	Apps	Goals
Wales	2006	2	0
Wales	2012	1	0
Total		3	0

== Honours ==
Individual

- Gillingham Player of the Year: 2005–06
- Wales Young Player of the Year: 2003
