= Gary Mulligan =

Irish footballer

Personal information
- Full name: Gary Thomas Mulligan
- Date of birth: 23 April 1985 (age 41)
- Place of birth: Dublin, Ireland
- Height: 6 ft 1 in (1.85 m)
- Position: Forward

Team information
- Current team: AFC Rushden & Diamonds

Youth career
- Belvedere
- 2001–2004: Wolverhampton Wanderers

Senior career*
Years	Team	Apps	(Gls)
2004–2005	Wolverhampton Wanderers	1	(0)
2004	→ Rushden & Diamonds (loan)	13	(3)
2005–2006	Sheffield United	0	(0)
2005	→ Port Vale (loan)	10	(1)
2005	→ Gillingham (loan)	13	(1)
2006–2009	Gillingham	94	(14)
2009–2010	Northampton Town	9	(0)
2010–2012	Gateshead	45	(7)
2012–2014	Brackley Town	72	(6)
2014–2015	Dunstable Town	16	(2)
2015–2018	Kettering Town	132	(4)
2018–2022	Corby Town	69	(2)
2022–2025	Harborough Town	60	(0)
2025–	AFC Rushden & Diamonds	5	(1)
Total		536	(41)

International career
- Republic of Ireland U21

Managerial career
- 2019–2020: Corby Town (caretaker)
- * Club domestic league appearances and goals as of 19:02, 30 April 2026 (UTC)

Gary Thomas Mulligan (born 23 April 1985) is an Irish footballer who plays as a forward who plays for Northern Premier League Division One Midlands club AFC Rushden & Diamonds.

Coming through the Wolverhampton Wanderers academy in 2004, and played on loan at Rushden & Diamonds before he joined Sheffield United the following year. He did not make a first-team appearance for the "Blades" and instead was loaned out to Port Vale and Gillingham. In 2006, he transferred to Gillingham permanently, where he remained for three years before joining Northampton Town. In 2010, he joined non-League Gateshead. He signed with Brackley Town in February 2012 and helped the club to the Southern League title in 2011–12. In 2015, he signed for Kettering Town via Dunstable Town, and helped Kettering to win the Southern League Division One Central title in 2014–15 and then successive Hillier Cup titles in 2017 and 2018. He signed with Corby Town in June 2018 and served as joint-caretaker manager the following year. He signed with Harborough Town in March 2022 and helped the club to win the United Counties League Premier Division South title at the end of the 2021–22 season. He joined AFC Rushden & Diamonds in June 2025.

== Career ==
=== Wolverhampton Wanderers ===
Born in Dublin, Mulligan played his youth football at Belvedere before moving on to Wolverhampton Wanderers, for whom he made only one appearance, as an 82nd minute substitute in the 1–1 draw with Burnley at Turf Moor on 21 August 2004. Wolves sent him on loan to Rushden & Diamonds in October of that year. Mulligan made his debut for Diamonds, again as a substitute, in the 1–0 home defeat to Chester City, and made his first start, and scored his first goal, in their next match, a 1–1 draw away to Wycombe Wanderers. He scored three goals in 13 games for Rushden & Diamonds but was released by his parent club at the end of the season.

=== Sheffield United ===
Mulligan was signed by Sheffield United in July 2005. He only made two appearances for them in the League Cup as chances at Bramall Lane were limited. In the 2005–06 season he went on loan to Port Vale for a month, which was extended by four weeks in October, and again in November, scoring once (against Walsall) in twelve games.

=== Gillingham ===
In January, he joined Vale's League One rivals Gillingham. He spent a month on the sidelines with ligament damage, which at first was feared to be a broken leg. Following his recovery he was back in the Gills' first-team and remained so until the end of the season. He scored one goal in 13 appearances for the "Gills".

"The only thing missing from his game is goals and hopefully they will come."

— Gillingham boss Ronnie Jepson on Mulligan.

His hard-working style had impressed Gillingham manager Ronnie Jepson and on 12 May 2006 he signed for Gillingham permanently. With 42 games to his credit in 2006–07, he was third in the club's Player of the Year voting behind Andrew Crofts and Mark Bentley. Following Mark Stimson's appointment in November 2007, Mulligan dropped out of first-team plans as the Gills sunk to relegation in 2007–08. His five goals fell way short of the target of 15–20 he had set himself. He admitted he considered switching to another club, though eventually he decided to stick with the Kent club, agreeing a one-year deal in June 2008. He kicked off the 2008–09 season with a goal against AFC Bournemouth, though did not believe this would mean a return in the first XI. Indeed, he scored just two goals in 31 games over the rest of the season, and he was released in the summer.

=== Northampton Town ===
He joined Northampton Town on a one-year deal in July 2009.

"He has a first class attitude...a good pedigree...[and is] a team player, he works his socks off for the benefit of the team and he can stretch defences with his work rate and his ability to run the channels and create space and opportunities for others."

— Northampton Town boss Stuart Gray on Mulligan.

He was released by the club in May 2010, along with five other players.

=== Non-League ===
In August 2010, Mulligan joined Gateshead on an initial five-month deal, making his debut against Kettering Town on 14 August. Mulligan scored his first goal for Gateshead on 21 August, away at Forest Green Rovers. On 23 December 2010, Gateshead extended Mulligan's contract until the end of the season. It was announced on 20 December 2011 that Mulligan would be released on 1 January 2012, at the end of his contract.

In February 2012, Mulligan joined Brackley Town. He made his debut on 21 February as a late substitute in a 2–1 win against Barwell. He played 12 games as the "Saints" won promotion was champions of the Southern League title in 2011–12. He helped the club to the Conference North play-off final at the end of the 2012–13 season, where they were beaten 1–0 by FC Halifax Town. He made 31 appearances in the 2013–14 campaign.

In February 2015 he signed with Southern League club Kettering Town after moving from Dunstable Town. The "Poppies" won promotion as champions of Division One Central in 2014–15 and finished sixth and then ninth in the Premier Division in 2015–16, with Mulligan scoring three goals from 45 matches in the latter campaign. Kettering again finished sixth in the 2016–17 season as Mulligan featured 47 times, including an appearance in the final of the Hillier Cup where Kettering beat Corby Town after a penalty shoot-out. He made 49 appearances across the 2017–18 campaign as Marcus Law led the side to a fourth-place finish and defeat in the play-off semi-finals to Slough Town. They also retained the Hillier Cup after beating Brackley Town 2–1 in the final.

On 28 June 2018, Mulligan signed with Southern League Division One Central side Corby Town and was immediately named club captain by manager Steven Kinniburgh, who was a former Kettering teammate. He made 43 appearances throughout the 2018–19 season, helping the "Steelmen" to a third-place finish and a place in the play-offs. Corby went on to reach the play-off final but were beaten 4–3 by Bromsgrove Sporting after extra time. He and Ash Robinson stepped up to the post of joint-caretaker managers following Kinniburgh's resignation in July 2019. They stayed in the role until the appointment of Mark Peters on 28 February, at which point Mulligan remained in a playing capacity. He made 28 appearances in the 2019–20 season, which was abandoned due to the COVID-19 pandemic in England, and again he confirmed he would be staying on at the club in June. He featured eleven times in the 2020–21 season, which was also curtailed early due to the ongoing pandemic.

On 7 March 2022, Mulligan joined United Counties League Premier Division South side Harborough Town. He helped the "Bees" to win the United Counties League Premier Division South title at the end of the 2021–22 season. He featured 36 times in the 2022–23 campaign as the club posted an eighth-place finish in the Northern Premier League Division One Midlands. He played 23 games in the 2023–24 season, including the play-off semi-final defeat to Hinckley Leicester Road. He played eight matches of the 2024–25 campaign, departing the club following the conclusion of the season.

In June 2025, Mulligan joined Northern Premier League Division One Midlands club AFC Rushden & Diamonds.

== Personal life ==
After leaving full-time professional football, Mulligan now works as a P.E teacher at Kettering Buccleuch Academy.

== Career statistics ==
As of end of the 2025–26 season

Appearances and goals by club, season and competition
Club	Season	League (Note: The "League" column constitutes appearances and goals (including those as a substitute) in the English Football League and Conference.)			FA Cup		League cup		Other (Note: The "Other" column constitutes appearances and goals (including those as a substitute) in the FA Trophy, Football League Trophy, play-offs and Hillier Cup.)		Total	
Club	Season	Division	Apps	Goals	Apps	Goals	Apps	Goals	Apps	Goals	Apps	Goals
Wolverhampton Wanderers	2004–05	Championship	1	0	0	0	0	0	—		1	0
Rushden & Diamonds (loan)	2004–05	League Two	13	3	0	0	0	0	0	0	13	3
Sheffield United	2005–06	Championship	0	0	0	0	2	0	—		2	0
Port Vale (loan)	2005–06	League One	10	1	1	0	—		1	0	12	1
Gillingham (loan)	2005–06	League One	13	1	—		—		—		13	1
Gillingham	2006–07	League One	38	7	2	1	1	0	1	1	42	9
Gillingham	2007–08	League One	30	5	1	0	1	0	2	0	34	5
Gillingham	2008–09	League Two	26	2	4	0	1	0	0	0	31	2
Gillingham	Total		107	15	7	1	3	0	3	1	120	17
Northampton Town	2009–10	League Two	9	0	0	0	0	0	3	0	12	0
Gateshead	2010–11	Conference National	31	7	2	0	—		2	0	35	7
Gateshead	2011–12	Conference National	14	0	0	0	—		1	0	15	0
Gateshead	Total		45	7	2	0	0	0	3	0	50	7
Brackley Town	2011–12	Southern League; Premier Division	12	2	0	0	—		0	0	12	2
Brackley Town	2012–13	Conference North	28	4	0	0	—		1	0	29	4
Brackley Town	2013–14	Conference North	26	0	5	0	—		0	0	31	0
Brackley Town	2014–15	Conference North	6	0	0	0	—		0	0	6	0
Brackley Town	Total		72	6	5	0	0	0	1	0	78	6
Dunstable Town	2014–15	Southern League; Premier Division	16	2	3	0	0	0	1	0	20	2
Kettering Town	2014–15	Southern League; Division One Central	13	1	0	0	0	0	1	0	14	1
Kettering Town	2015–16	Southern League; Premier Division	39	2	3	0	0	0	3	1	45	3
Kettering Town	2016–17	Southern League; Premier Division	40	0	4	0	0	0	3	0	47	0
Kettering Town	2017–18	Southern League; Premier Division	40	1	5	0	0	0	4	0	49	1
Kettering Town	Total		132	4	12	0	0	0	11	1	155	5
Corby Town	2018–19	Southern League; Division One Central	37	2	5	0	0	0	3	0	45	2
Corby Town	2019–20	Southern League; Division One Central	25	0	1	0	1	0	1	0	28	0
Corby Town	2020–21	Southern League; Division One Central	7	0	1	0	0	0	3	0	11	0
Corby Town	Total		69	2	7	0	1	0	7	0	84	2
Harborough Town
Harborough Town	2021–22	United Counties League; Premier Division South	10	0	4	0	0	0	1 (Note: Appearance(s) in Hinchingbrooke Cup)	0	11	0
Harborough Town	2022–23	Northern Premier League; Division One Midlands	28	0	4	0	0	0	2	0	34	0
Harborough Town	2023–24	Northern Premier League; Division One Midlands	18	0	2	0	0	0	3	0	23	0
Harborough Town	2024–25	Northern Premier League; Division One Midlands	4	0	3	0	0	0	1	0	8	0
AFC Rushden & Diamonds	2025–26	Northern Premier League; Division One Midlands	5	1	0	0	0	0	1 (Note: Appearance(s) in Northamptonshire Senior Cup)	0	6	0
AFC Rushden & Diamonds	2026–27	Northern Premier League; Division One Midlands	0	0	0	0	0	0	0	0	0	0
AFC Rushden & Diamonds	Total		6	0	0	0	0	0	0	0	6	0
Career totals (Note: Statistics for the 2021–22 season not recorded.)			552	42	50	1	6	0	38	2	646	45

== Honours ==
Brackley Town

- Southern League: 2011–12

Kettering Town

- Southern League Division One Central: 2014–15
- Hillier Cup: 2017 & 2018

Harborough Town

- United Counties League Premier Division South: 2021–22
