= St. Walburga's Church, Bruges =

Church in Bruges, Belgium

Coordinates: 51.2111°N 3.2294°E

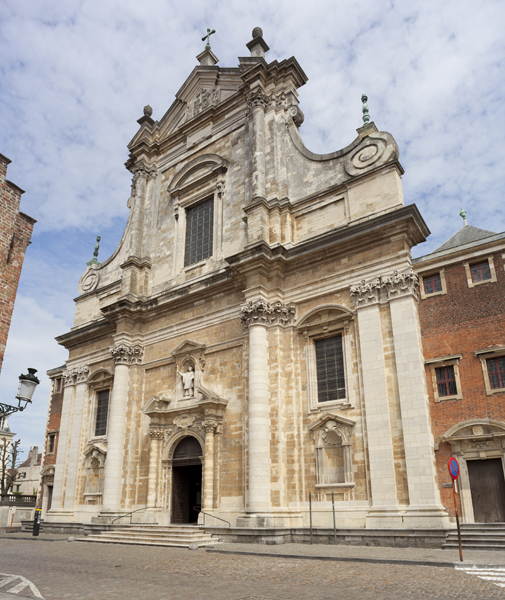
Façade of St. Walburga's Church

St. Walburga's Church (Dutch: Sint-Walburgakerk) is a 17th-century Catholic church in Bruges, Belgium, built by the Jesuits in a Baroque style. It is now a parish church and contains many valuable art objects.

== History ==
In 1596 the Jesuits first built a chapel. Soon after they started building a church with a college, a convent, a chapel and garden. Formal construction of the church took place between 1619 and 1641 after a design by local Jesuit architect Pieter Huyssens (1577–1637). After his death, his fellow Jesuit J. Boulé took over the supervision of the construction works. The original designs of Huyssens with respect to the tower, the vault and windows of the nave were not fully executed due to financial constraints and rivalry among the Jesuits of Bruges and Antwerp. The church was dedicated to St. Francis Xavier by Msgr. Nicolas de Haudrion in 1642.

In 1773 the Jesuit Order was dissolved and the church closed by imperial decree. The Jesuit church was taken over as parish church in 1777 as the original parish church was dilapidated. The parish church was demolished in 1781 and its furnishings sold to finance the restoration of the decaying Jesuit church. In 1779 the former Jesuit church was inaugurated as a parish church and the relics of St. Walburga were transferred to it. The church was turned into a Temple of the Law in 1796 by the French occupiers. The church recovered its religious function under the name "St. Donatian Church" in 1805 after the transfer of the relics of Saint Donatian from the dilapidated church of the same name.

In 1854 the church was unofficially awarded its current name. The church incurred heavy damage mainly to the northern aisle due to a bomb explosion in 1918.

== Exterior ==
The stone façade was inspired by the Church of the Gesù in Rome. The structure of the church consists of an aisled nave of seven bays and built-in choir with one bay and an apse. The building was constructed with bricks while sandstone was used for the façade.

== Interior ==
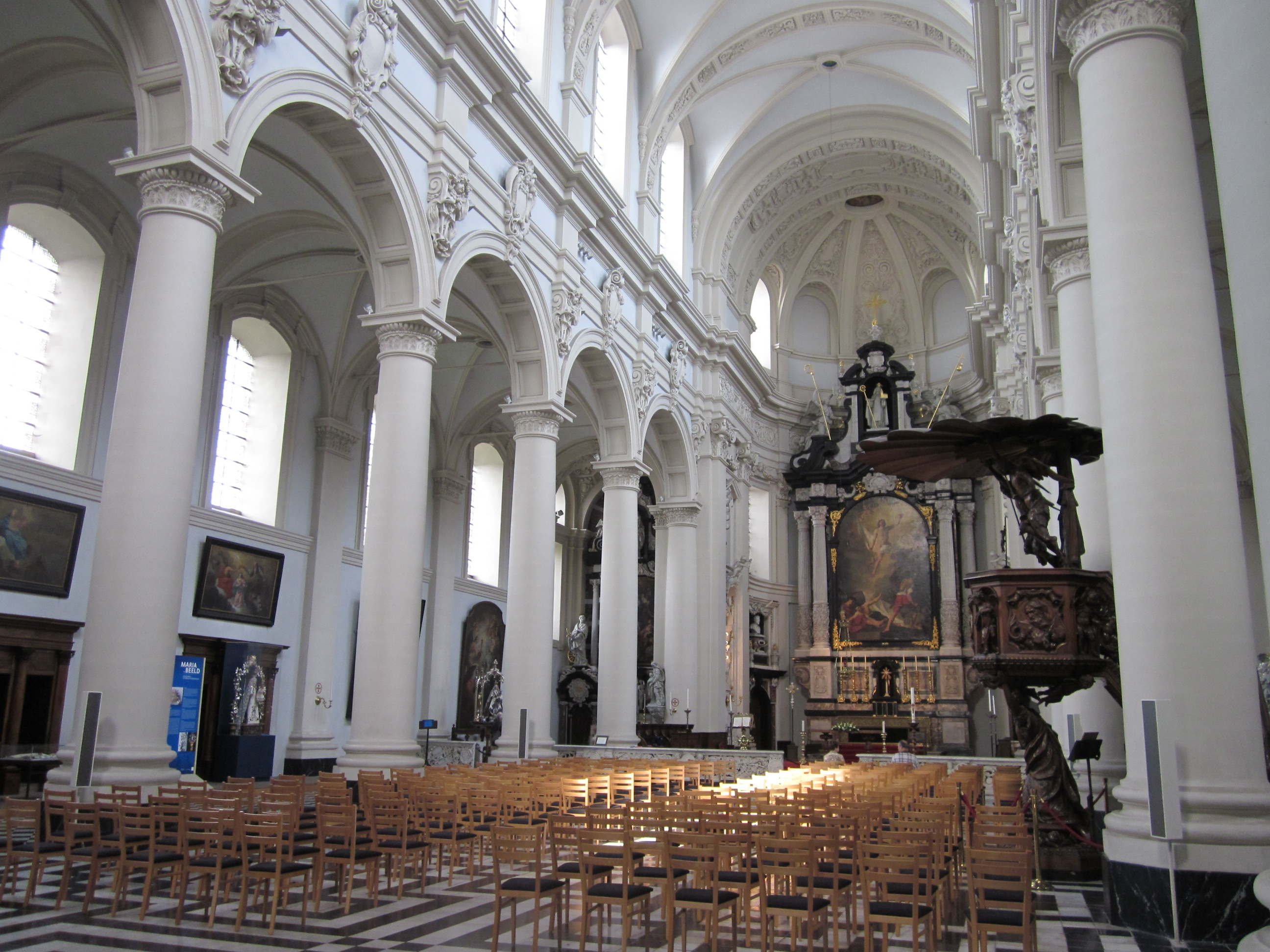
View of the interior

Inside, the Baroque character is strengthened by mouldings, volutes, broken pediments, and pilasters and columns, which create light effects.

The floor of the choir has geometric motives and it has been claimed that they represent an ancient Arabic language called Kufic. The church holds several paintings in the choir, aisles and above the rood screen including: 14 paintings on the Fifteen mysteries of the rosary from the circle of Jan Anton Garemyn (1750), the Glorification of the Holy Sacrament by Jan Anton Garemyn (1740s), the Coronation of Our Lady by Erasmus Quellinus II (17th century), the Lamentation of Christ by Joseph Denis Odevaere (1812), the Resurrection by Joseph-Benoît Suvée (18th century), the Vision of St. Ignatius by P. Cassiers, a triptych of Our Lady of the Dry Tree by Pieter Claeissens the Younger (1620) and an anonymous canvas of St. Domenic healing a child.

The church has a monumental marble altar by Jacob Cocx (dedicated in 1643) with a statue of St. Walburga by Houvenaegel (1842). Above the portals are placed busts of St. Francis Xavier and St. Francis Borgia and statues of St. Aloysius Gonzaga and St. Stanislaus Kostka.

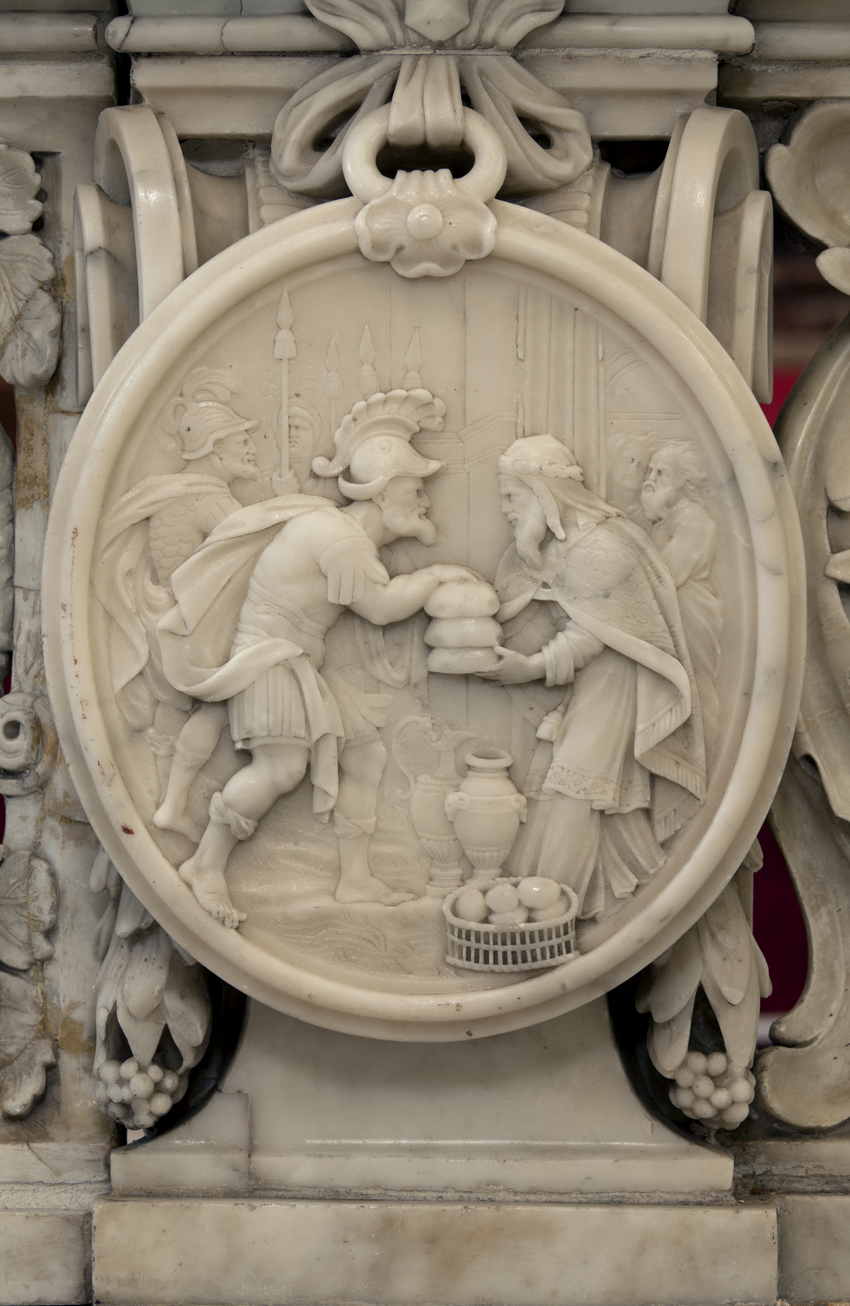
Detail of the communion rails by Hendrik Frans Verbrugghen

The northern side altar is by Pieter Verbrugghen I (1657) with two Baroque portals and various statues of saints dating from the 17th century. The southern side altar is also by Pieter Verbrugghen I (1669) and has oak doors and statues of St. Peter, St. Paul and St. Rochus.

The white marble communion rails were made by Hendrik Frans Verbrugghen in 1695. These rails are a high point of Flemish Baroque sculpture. Because of the virtuoso treatment of the marble they appear to be modeled in wax. The confessionals in classicizing style date from 1802. The oak choir stalls and communion rails are from the 18th century. The Baroque pulpit is a work of Artus Quellinus II (1670) and was made on the basis of the iconography of Willem Hesius.

The organ case was commenced in 1735 by Frenchman Cornil Cacheux and completed by Jean Baptiste Fremat in 1739. It is decorated with statues of graceful women and Jesus on the Globe.

== See also ==
- List of Jesuit sites
