= Pieter Huyssens =

Pieter Huyssens (22 February 1577 – 6 June 1637) was a Flemish Jesuit brother and Baroque architect.

== Biography ==
Huyssens was born in Bruges, the son of Jacob and Cathelijne Boudens. His father and grandfather were master masons, and Pieter was already a master mason when he entered the Society of Jesus in 1596 in Tournai. His first architectural commission for the society was the construction of the college church of Maastricht in 1606 (today a theatre). Called to Antwerp in 1613, he drew the plans of the Church of St Ignatius (now called Carolus Borromeuskerk) under the direction of François d'Aguilon. After Aguilon's death in 1617, Huyssens became the contractor and collaborated with Peter Paul Rubens decorating the church with paintings. Together they made this church into a Baroque masterpiece. During this period Huyssens started other projects in Namur and Bruges for Jesuit churches.

He made a trip to Rome in 1626-1627 for the Infanta Isabella Clara Eugenia who wanted marble for her new palace chapel in Brussels. On his return to Belgium he built the Church of St Francis Xavier (now the St. Walburga Church) in Bruges. Construction was completed in 1641 after Huyssens' death. In 1628, he drew the plans for the church of the abbey of St Peter in Ghent.

Huyssens died in his native city of Bruges, after a long illness, aged 60.

== Buildings ==
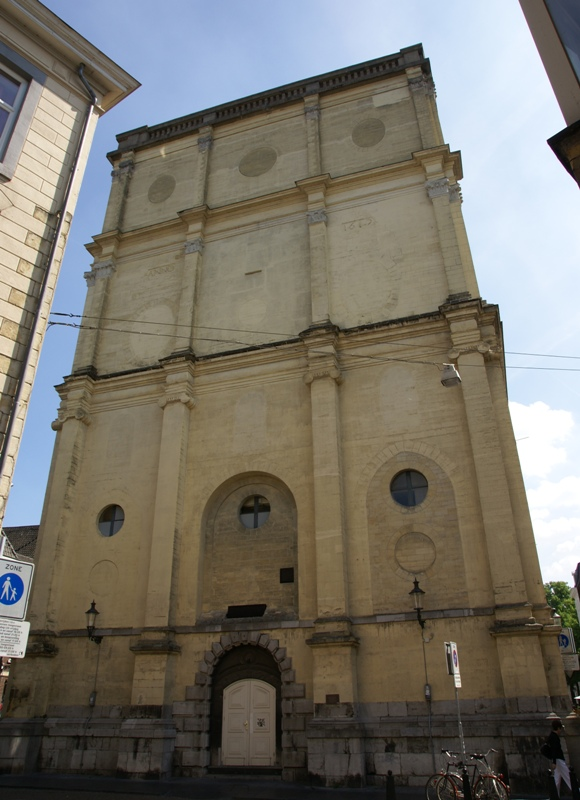
Facade of the Jesuit church in Maastricht

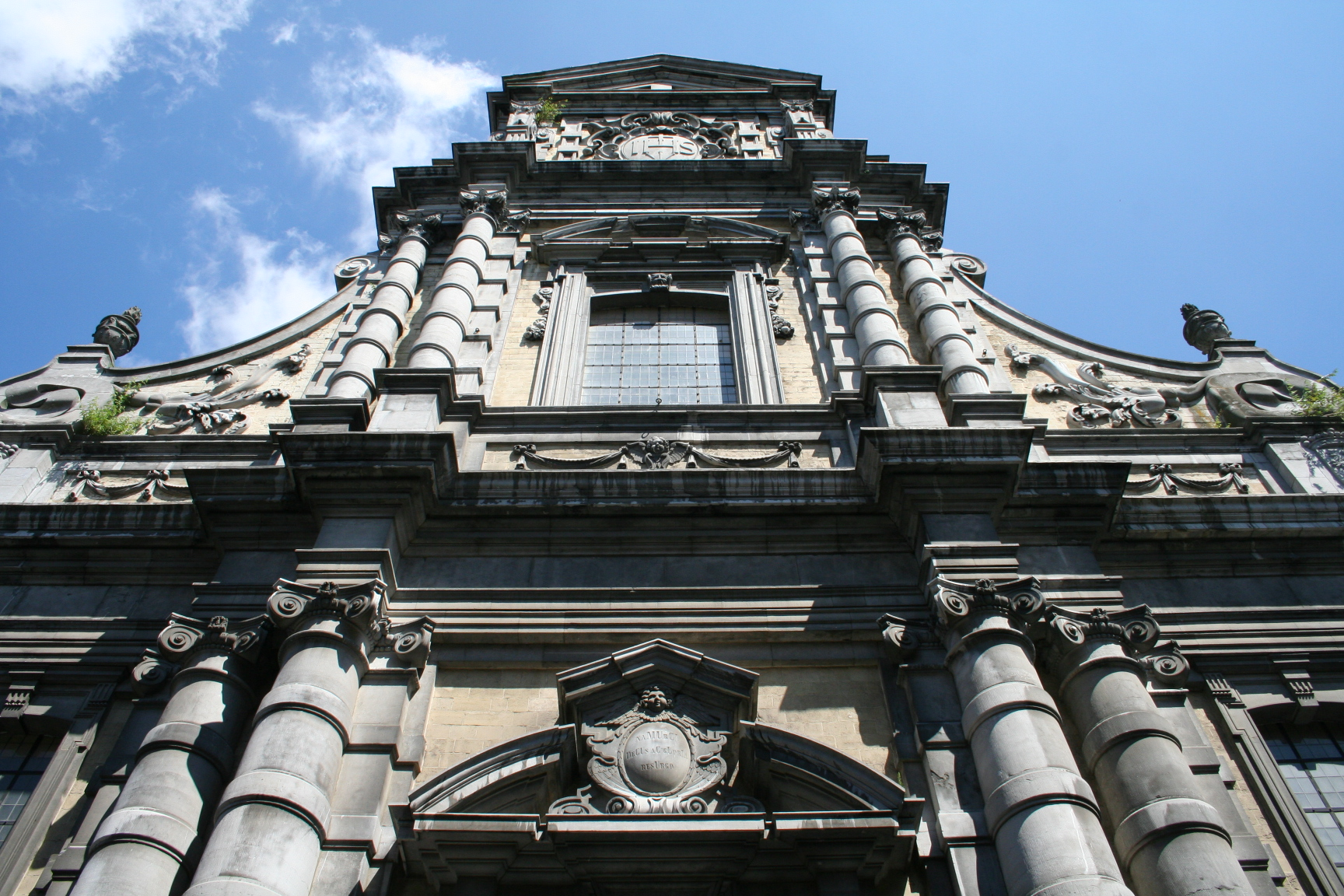
The church of Saint Loup in Namur.

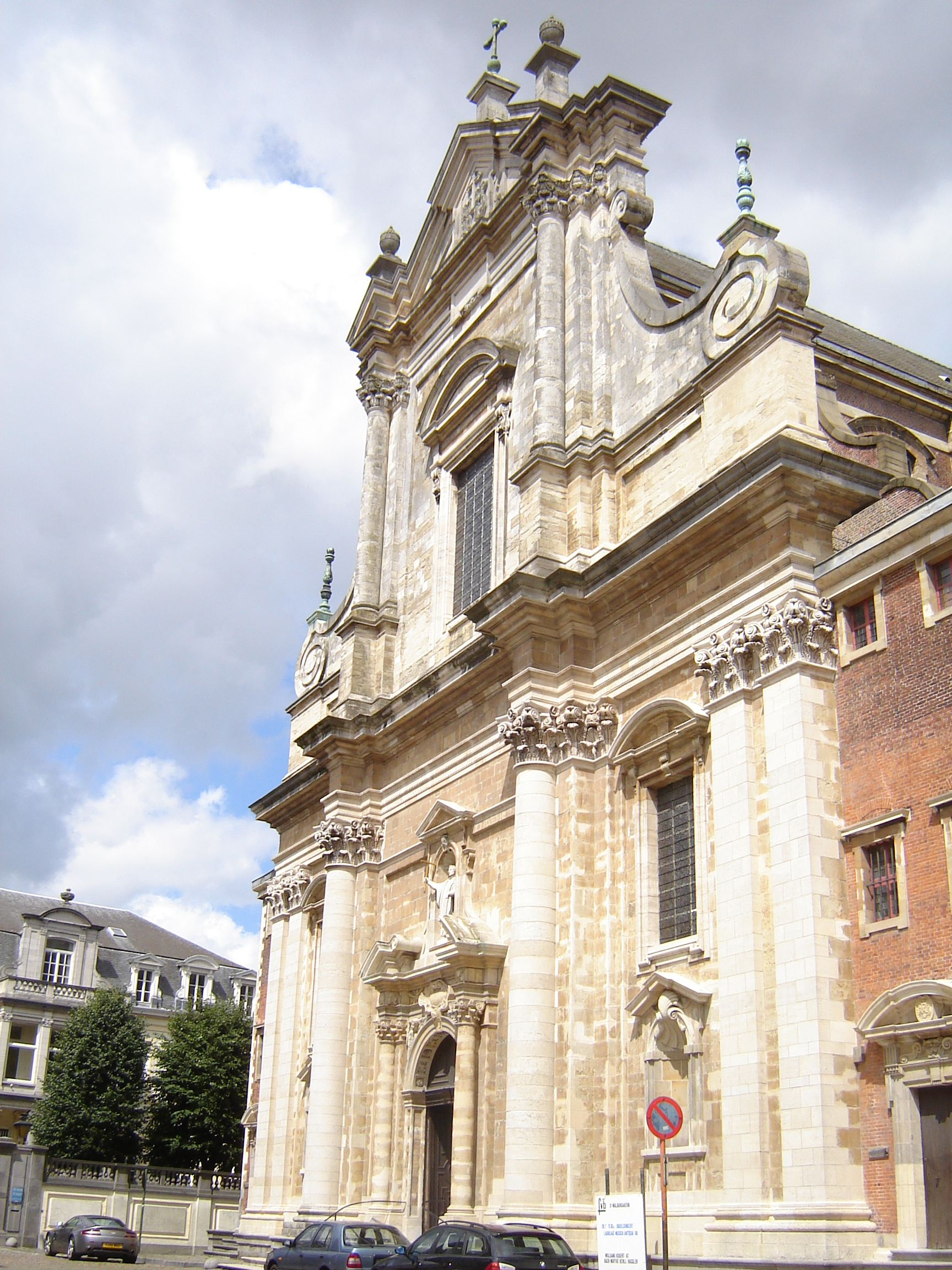
St. Walburga Church, Bruges

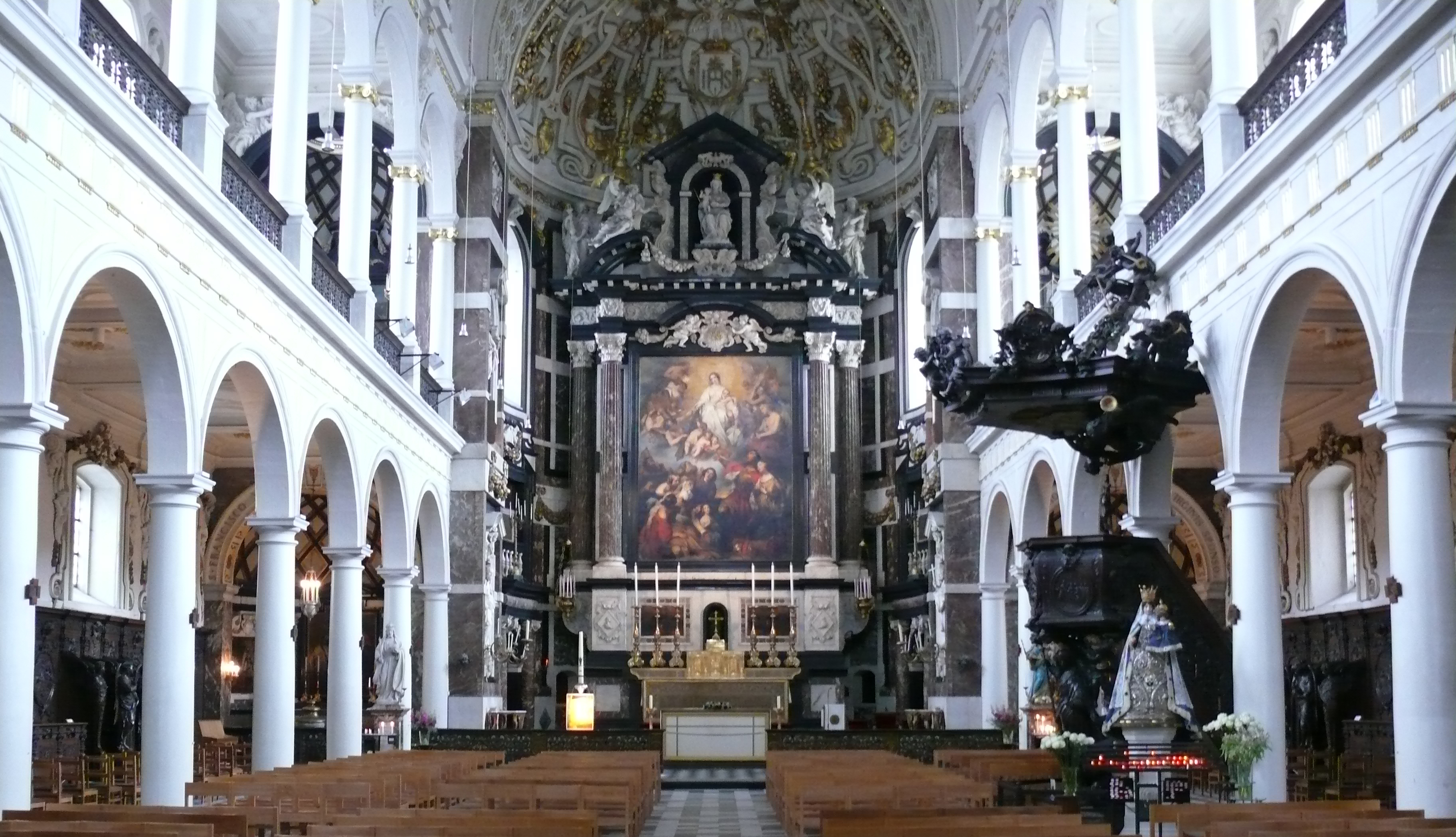
Interior of the Carolus Borromeuskerk, Antwerp

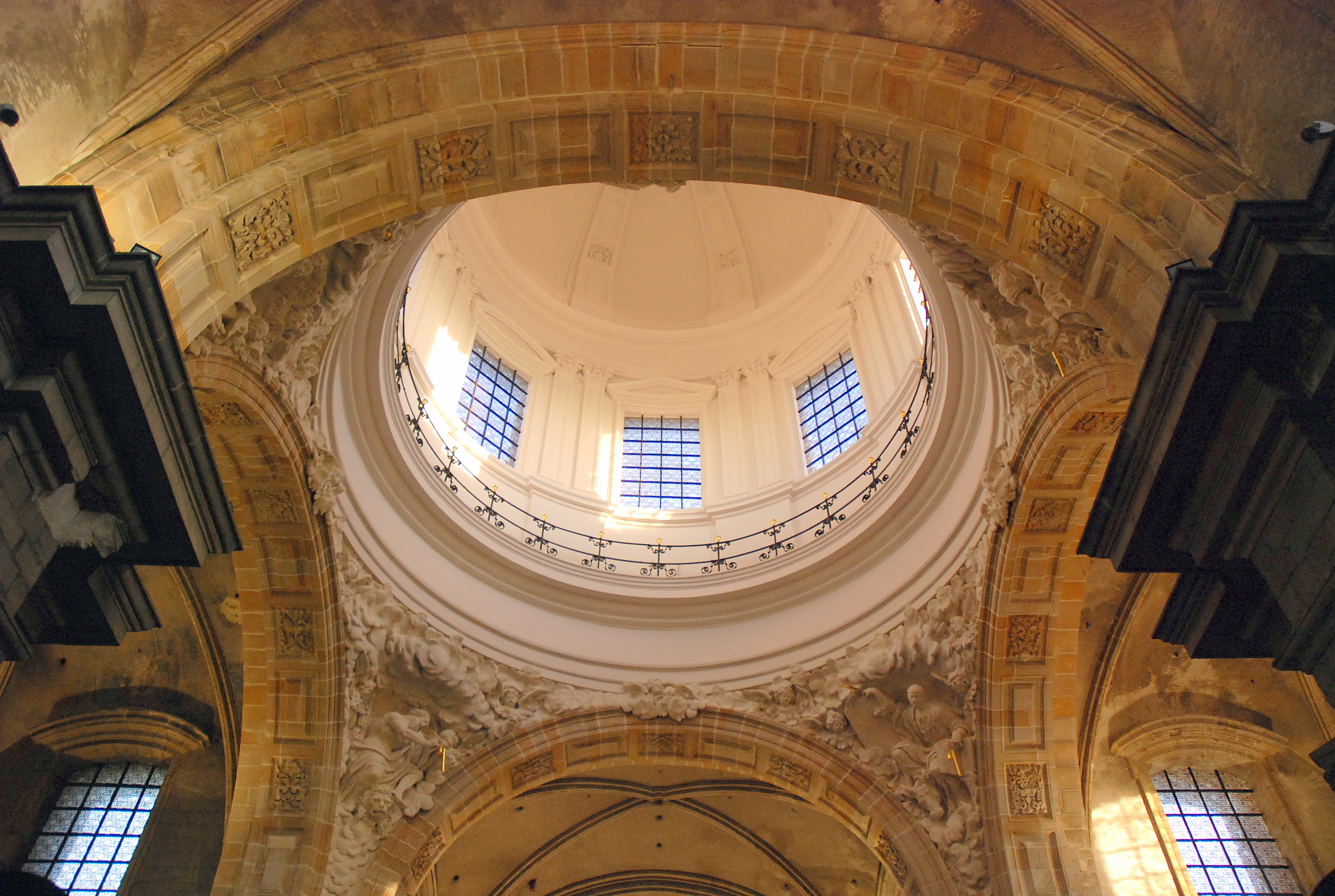
St-Pietersabdijkerk, Ghent

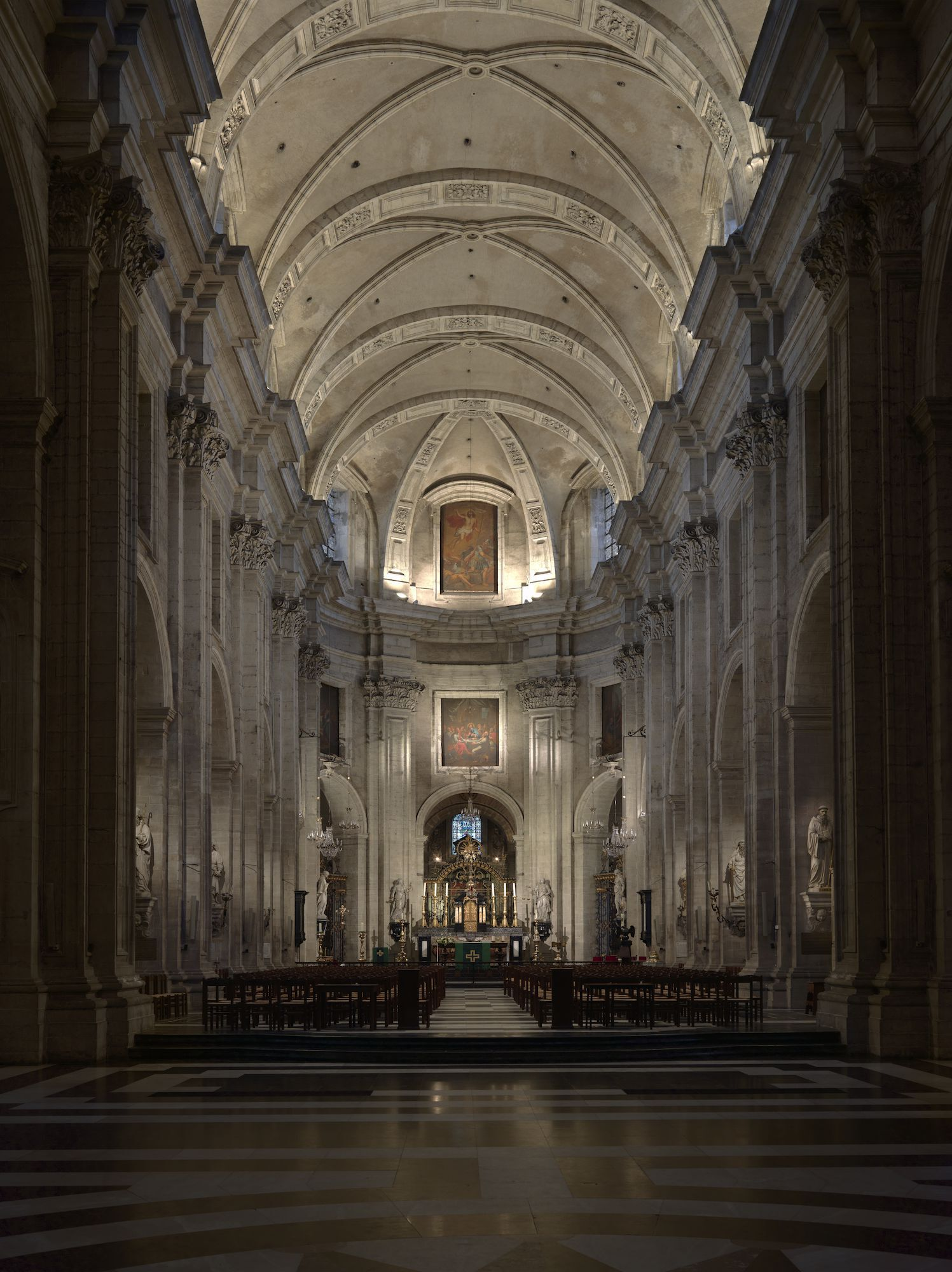
Central nave, Saint Peter's Abbey, Ghent
