= 1999–2000 Millwall F.C. season =

- Manager: Keith Stevens and Alan McLeary (joint managers)
- Stadium: The New Den
- Division Two: 5th (qualified for play-offs)
- Play-offs: Semi-finals
- FA Cup: First round
- League Cup: First round

During the 1999–2000 English football season, Millwall F.C. competed in the Football League Second Division, the third tier of English football.

== Season summary ==
Millwall had a good season and finished fifth in the Second Division, qualifying for the play-offs, but were beaten in the semi-finals by Wigan Athletic 1–0 on aggregate. The club also saw failure in both domestic cup competitions, being eliminated from both in the first round.

== Final league table ==
Pos	Team	Pld	W	D	L	GF	GA	GD	Pts	Promotion or relegation
3	Gillingham (O, P)	46	25	10	11	79	48	+31	85	Qualification for the Second Division play-offs
4	Wigan Athletic	46	22	17	7	72	38	+34	83	Qualification for the Second Division play-offs
5	Millwall	46	23	13	10	76	50	+26	82	Qualification for the Second Division play-offs
6	Stoke City	46	23	13	10	68	42	+26	82	Qualification for the Second Division play-offs
7	Bristol Rovers	46	23	11	12	69	45	+24	80	

Rules for classification: 1) Points; 2) Goal difference; 3) Goals scored
(O) Play-off winners; (P) Promoted

== Players ==
=== First-team squad ===
Note: Flags indicate national team as defined under FIFA eligibility rules; some limited exceptions apply. Players may hold more than one non-FIFA nationality.

No.	Pos.	Nation	Player
1	GK	ENG	Tony Warner (Note: Warner was born in Liverpool, England, but also qualified to represent Trinidad and Tobago internationally and made his international debut for Trinidad and Tobago in February 2006.)
2	MF	CAN	Marc Bircham (Note: Bircham was born in Brent, England, but also qualified to represent Canada internationally through his grandfather and made his international debut for Canada in April 1999.)
3	MF	SKN	Bobby Bowry (Note: Bowry was born in Croydon, England, but also qualified to represent Saint Kitts and Nevis internationally and made his international debut for Saint Kitts and Nevis in 2000.)
4	MF	SAM	Tim Cahill (Note: Cahill was born in Sydney, Australia, but also qualified to represent Samoa, England, and the Republic of Ireland through his mother, father, and grandparents respectively, and represented Samoa (then called Western Samoa) at U-20 level, unsuccessfully attempted to overturn a FIFA ruling that prevented him from representing the Republic of Ireland during the 2001–02 season, changed his allegiance to Australia in 2003 following a change in FIFA's eligibility rules and made his international debut for Australia in March 2004.)
5	DF	ENG	Dave Tuttle
6	DF	ENG	Joe Dolan
7	DF	IRL	Scott Fitzgerald (Note: Fitzgerald was born in Westminster, England, but also qualified to represent the Republic of Ireland internationally and represented the Republic of Ireland at U-21 and B level.)
8	DF	ENG	Matt Lawrence
9	FW	ENG	Neil Harris
10	MF	BEL	Christophe Kinet
11	MF	ENG	Paul Ifill (Note: Ifill was born in Brighton, England, but also qualified to represent Barbados internationally through his parents and made his international debut for Barbados in June 2004.)
12	FW	ENG	Paul Moody
13	GK	ENG	Nigel Spink
14	DF	AUS	Lucas Neill
15	DF	ENG	Stuart Nethercott
16	MF	ENG	Ricky Newman
17	MF	ENG	Leke Odunsi

No.	Pos.	Nation	Player
18	MF	ENG	Steven Reid (Note: Reid was born in Kingston upon Thames, England, and represented England at U-16 level, but also qualified to represent the Republic of Ireland internationally through his grandfather and made his international debut for the Republic of Ireland in 2001.)
19	DF	IRL	Robbie Ryan
20	FW	IRL	Richard Sadlier
21	MF	ENG	Paul Shaw
23	DF	ENG	Jamie Stuart
24	DF	ENG	Sean Dyche
25	MF	BRB	Michael Gilkes (Note: Gilkes was born in Hackney, England, but also qualified to represent Barbados internationally and made his international debut for Barbados in 2000.)
26	MF	ENG	David Livermore
28	GK	ENG	Richard Barnard
29	MF	ENG	Byron Bubb (Note: Bubb was born in Harrow, England, but also qualified to represent Grenada internationally and made his international debut for Grenada in 2004.)
30	DF	ENG	Ronnie Bull
32	DF	ENG	Leon Cort (Note: Cort was born in Southwark, England, but also qualified to represent Guyana internationally and made his international debut for Guyana in 2010.)
33	FW	NIR	Mark Hicks
34	DF	WAL	Brian Law
35	DF	ENG	Billy Mead
36	FW	ENG	Tommy Tyne

=== Left club during season ===
Note: Flags indicate national team as defined under FIFA eligibility rules; some limited exceptions apply. Players may hold more than one non-FIFA nationality.

No.	Pos.	Nation	Player
5	DF	ENG	Andy Cook (released)
8	FW	GHA	Kim Grant (to Lommel)
10	FW	ENG	Danny Hockton (to Stevenage Borough)

No.	Pos.	Nation	Player
22	GK	ENG	Phil Smith (released)
31	MF	ENG	Jimmy Carter (retired)
