= Neil Harris (footballer, born 1977) =

English footballer and manager

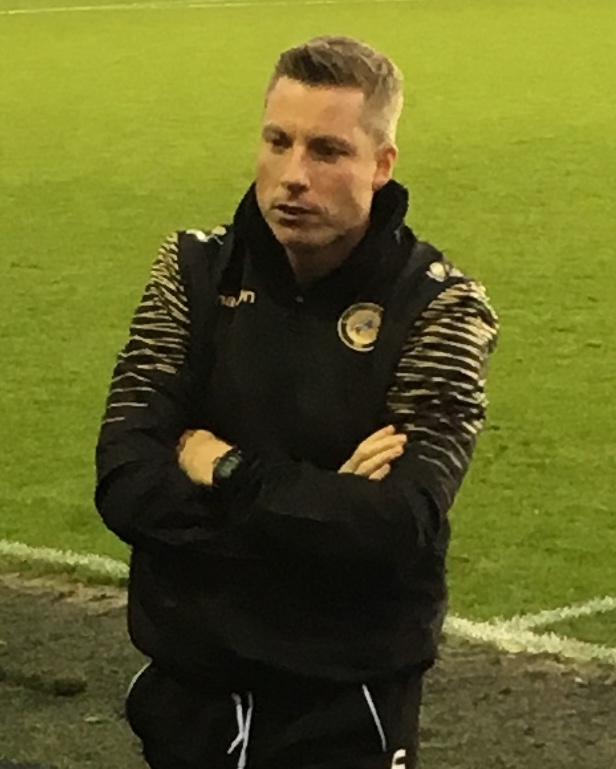
- Harris as manager of Millwall, 2015

Personal information
- Full name: Neil Harris
- Date of birth: 12 July 1977 (age 49)
- Place of birth: Orsett, England
- Height: 5 ft 11 in (1.80 m)
- Position: Striker

Team information
- Current team: Cambridge United (manager)

Youth career
- –1996: Maldon Town

Senior career*
Years	Team	Apps	(Gls)
1996–1998	Cambridge City	51	(29)
1998–2004	Millwall	233	(93)
2004	→ Cardiff City (loan)	3	(1)
2004–2007	Nottingham Forest	33	(1)
2005–2006	→ Gillingham (loan)	36	(6)
2007–2011	Millwall	141	(31)
2011–2013	Southend United	40	(8)
2014	Rayleigh Town	4	(2)
Total		490	(142)

Managerial career
- 2013–2014: Millwall (caretaker)
- 2015–2019: Millwall
- 2019–2021: Cardiff City
- 2022–2023: Gillingham
- 2023–2024: Cambridge United
- 2024: Millwall
- 2025–: Cambridge United
- * Club domestic league appearances and goals

Neil Harris (born 12 July 1977) is an English professional football manager and former footballer who played as a striker. He is the manager of EFL League One club Cambridge United.

Harris is Millwall's all-time record goalscorer, with 138 goals in all competitions. He broke the previous record of 111 goals, held by Teddy Sheringham, on 13 January 2009, during a 3–2 away win at Crewe Alexandra. He has made the fourth most appearances for the club, with 432. He also played for Cambridge City, Cardiff City, Nottingham Forest, Gillingham and Southend United. Harris retired from professional football in June 2013 and took up a coaching role at Millwall. Having briefly acted as caretaker-manager after the dismissal of Steve Lomas in January 2014, Harris was given the same role following the dismissal of Ian Holloway in March 2015 and was confirmed as permanent manager of Millwall on 29 April 2015. He moved on to become manager of Cardiff City in November 2019. In January 2022, Harris was appointed as the new first team manager of Gillingham on a two-and-a-half-year contract. In late 2023, he joined Cambridge United but less than three months later he left the club to return to Millwall. Following his time at Millwall, he rejoined Cambridge United as the first team manager and led them to promotion from League Two in 2026

== Playing career ==
=== Early career and Millwall ===
Harris was born in Orsett, Essex, and educated at Brentwood School. Prior to beginning his professional football career he worked in The City as an insurance underwriter.

One of his earliest clubs was Maldon Town but his real football career began when he signed for Cambridge City for £5,000. In December 1997 he had a trial at Liverpool, however this didn't lead to a transfer. He was later sold to Millwall for a fee of £30,000 on 25 March 1998, with the potential to rise to £100,000 based on performance. In his first full season, he was named player of the year for Millwall, scored in their defeat in the 1999 Football League Trophy final and later helped them to a Second Division championship in 2000–01. With 27 goals, Harris was the Golden Boot winner for being the top English goal scorer during the 2000–01 season, earning him the nickname of "Bomber", in reference to Arthur Travers Harris. Neil Harris was diagnosed with testicular cancer in 2001, but after receiving intensive treatment including surgery, he was given the all clear a year later. As a consequence he set up a cancer charity, the Neil Harris Everyman Appeal. By the end of his first spell at Millwall, Harris was not being played because the then player-manager Dennis Wise did not believe he was up to par, and that led him to sign for Cardiff City on loan to prove he was good enough for first team football at Millwall.

Harris made his debut for Cardiff City when he replaced Cameron Jerome during a 3–1 win over Gillingham and, after one more substitute appearance, was handed his first and only start for Cardiff when manager Lennie Lawrence named him to play against Sheffield United and he repaid the faith shown in him by scoring Cardiff's only goal of the game in a 2–1 defeat.

=== Nottingham Forest ===
Cardiff City and Harris could not agree terms and he was subsequently sold to Nottingham Forest for an undisclosed fee after they were relegated to Football League One in the 2004–05 season.

Harris was unable to make an impact at the City Ground so was loaned out to Gillingham who had also been relegated to League One at the same time as Nottingham Forest. He scored six goals for Gillingham during his season long loan spell, at the end of which he returned to Forest.

Harris was hoping to make an impact under new manager Colin Calderwood. Harris's old club Millwall made a loan deal for him on a six-month deal in August 2006, however Harris rejected the offer saying if he were to move it would have to be on a permanent basis, and with Darren Byfield and Ben May set to return from injury for Millwall, Harris believed he would have once again been forced out the side, which was the reason he left The Den in the first instance. Millwall therefore, withdrew from transfer negotiations.

Harris finally opened his goal-scoring account for Forest on 2 September 2006, after 21 months of waiting in a 4–0 victory against Chesterfield. It was a cutely struck volley from a few yards out. His and his teammates' joy was clear to see in his celebration, as he ran towards the corner of the stadium and did not look as though he would stop, until his teammates caught up. In the post match report, he admitted he was finally enjoying life at Nottingham Forest. Nonetheless, a certain contingent of the Forest fans still criticised Harris for his relatively poor scoring record and somewhat poor performance record.

In January 2007 Harris' contract was terminated by mutual consent.

=== Return to Millwall ===
Harris re-signed with Millwall on an 18-month contract on 8 January 2007, less than 24 hours after leaving Forest. Speaking to BBC Sport the next day Harris stated, "There is something special about this club, it brings out the best in me as a player and a person. It feels like home, it always has done. I can't wait to get started."

On 20 January 2007, in his second game for Millwall, Harris made club history by scoring in the 16th minute of the 4–0 win over Rotherham to become Millwall's top league goal scorer with 94 goals, surpassing the previous club record of 93 goals he had jointly held with Teddy Sheringham. Harris informed the South London Press, on 23 January, that it was his intention to surpass Sheringham's 111 goal total for Millwall, stating: "There is no question of me relaxing after one goal. At last I can say, without putting too much pressure on myself, that I want Teddy's overall record. The thing I've always wanted is to be number one, and that means getting a total of 112."

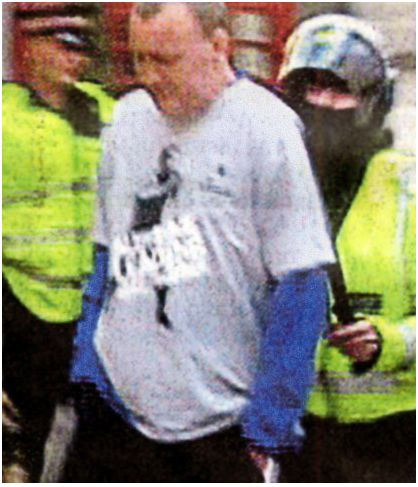
Ian Tomlinson wearing a "Neil Harris all-time leading goal scorer" T-shirt over a Millwall top, shortly before his death during the 2009 G-20 summit protests.

Towards the end of the 2007–08 season, as the club were mired in a relegation battle, Millwall boss Kenny Jackett told Harris that his contract would not be renewed in the summer as he was not in his first team plans for the following season; younger players such as Lewis Grabban, Gary Alexander, Bas Savage and Marc Laird had pushed him down the pecking order. Harris responded by stating that he had no intention of leaving the club he loved in its hour of need. Jackett brought Harris back into the first team squad on 15 March 2008, due to an injury to Gary Alexander that kept him out for the remainder of the season. Harris was instrumental in securing Millwall's League One status, scoring one goal and turning provider for the other two in Millwall's 3–0 home win over Carlisle United on 26 April. After a strong set of performances, the 30-year-old striker had managed to change Kenny Jackett's mind and was offered a new one-year contract on 6 May. Harris stated: "The club have made me a new offer which has pleased me professionally, because it shows that I have done enough to change the manager's mind. That makes me very happy." Harris signed a new one-year contract with The Lions on 4 June 2008.

On 13 January 2009, Harris broke Teddy Sheringham's all time goal scoring record for Millwall during the 3–2 away win against Crewe Alexandra with his 112th goal for the club. On 4 April, Harris signed a new one-year extension to his contract.

On 9 May 2009, Harris scored a vital 71st-minute goal in the first leg of the play-off semi-final against Leeds United to put them 1–0 up going into the second leg at Elland Road.

On 11 August 2009, Harris scored a hattrick in a first round League Cup tie at home to AFC Bournemouth. Neil also scored the opening goal in the 3–1 extra time defeat to West Ham in the next round of the League Cup. Harris scored once in the 3–1 victory over Huddersfield Town, and also netted a hat-trick in the 4–0 away win at Stockport County.

Harris suffered minor injuries during the latter part of the autumn 2009, but was in form again in January.

On 28 January 2010, Harris prolonged his contract with Millwall until 2012.

=== Southend United ===
On 9 June 2011, Harris agreed a three-year deal with Southend United. He had a year to run on his deal with Millwall but manager, Kenny Jacket agreed to cancel the striker's contract by mutual consent allowing him to sign for his hometown club on a free transfer. He scored his first goal for the club in a 4–0 win at Rotherham United on 24 September 2011. Harris retired on 21 June 2013 after failing to recover from an injury.

In the infancy of the 2014–15 season, Harris played four times for Essex Olympian League side Rayleigh Town.

== Managerial career ==
=== Millwall ===
Before taking over as permanent manager in the summer of 2015, Harris had several stints as caretaker manager.

First, he became caretaker manager, along with Scott Fitzgerald, taking over from the sacked Steve Lomas, on 26 December 2013, in which time they played 3 games, drawing one and losing twice, including a 4–1 away loss to Southend United in the FA Cup. The couple were then replaced by Ian Holloway on 7 January 2014.

Harris then again took over as caretaker boss on 10 March 2015, when Holloway was sacked. By the time Harris took over, Millwall were already virtually, whilst not mathematically, relegated, however Harris went on to win 2 and draw 4 of his 9 games in charge, almost keeping the Lions in the Championship. On 28 April, the Lions were officially relegated to League One following Rotherham United's 2–1 win against Reading, however, Harris was confirmed as Millwall's permanent manager less than 24 hours later, with his assistant being his 2004 FA Cup final teammate, David Livermore.

In his first full season as manager Harris led Millwall to the League One play-off final against Barnsley at Wembley after finishing 4th in the League One table and overcoming Bradford City 4–2 on aggregate in the play-off semi-finals. The Lions lost the play-off final 3–1 to Barnsley.

In 2016–17 season Harris again led Millwall to Wembley after they finished 6th in the League One table and overcame Scunthorpe United 3–2 in the play-off semi-finals. Millwall won the play-off final against Bradford City 1–0 to win promotion to the Championship. He also led Millwall to the FA Cup quarter-finals after knocking out three Premier League teams Bournemouth, Watford and Premier League Champions Leicester City before losing 6–0 against Tottenham Hotspur in the quarter-finals.

On 3 October 2019, Harris resigned as manager of Millwall.

=== Cardiff City ===
On 16 November 2019, Harris was appointed manager of Championship side Cardiff City. In his first season, he finished 5th in the league taking Cardiff to the play-off semi-finals against Fulham.

On 21 January 2021, Harris was sacked from Cardiff City. The Bluebirds had initially only won three of their opening 13 fixtures of the season, inviting pressure on Harris. Despite later securing a 4-match winning streak, a run 6 straight defeats afterwards sealed his fate as manager.

=== Gillingham ===
On 31 January 2022, Harris was appointed as manager of League One side Gillingham, signing a two-and-a-half-year deal with the Kent side. His first season ended in relegation to League Two. After receiving a red card in the penultimate game of the 2021–22 season against Portsmouth, Harris was given a touchline ban that would see him miss the first match of the club's first League Two season in ten years as well as receiving a £1,000 fine.

In the 2022–23 season Harris steered Gillingham to the fourth round of the EFL Cup for only the third time in the club's history. The Gills defeated Premier League side Brentford on penalties in the third round, before succumbing to another top tier side in Wolverhampton Wanderers 2–0 in the following round. He was dismissed from the role in October 2023.

=== Cambridge United ===
On 6 December 2023, Harris was appointed head coach of League One club Cambridge United on an 18-month contract.

=== Millwall (second spell) ===
On 21 February 2024, Harris returned to Millwall as head coach on an 18-month contract. The Lions were then 21st in the Championship, one point above the relegation zone. Under Harris' stewardship, the club recorded 26 points from 13 games to finish 13th in the table, concluding the season with a 1-0 away victory at Swansea City, which formed part of a five-game winning streak. On 10 December 2024, with Millwall 11th in the Championship, Harris said he would be leaving the club following the side's match at Middlesbrough on 14 December 2024.

=== Cambridge United (second spell) ===
On 19 February 2025, Harris returned to League One bottom side Cambridge United as head coach.

Harris was named EFL League Two Manager of the Month for January 2026 after a perfect month saw the club climb to second place in League Two. In the 2025–26 season, the team secured promotion for an instant return to League One.

== Career statistics ==
=== Playing statistics ===
Appearances and goals by club, season and competition
Club	Season	League			FA Cup		League Cup		Other		Total	
Club	Season	Division	Apps	Goals	Apps	Goals	Apps	Goals	Apps	Goals	Apps	Goals
Millwall	1997–98	Second Division	3	0	0	0	0	0	0	0	3	0
Millwall	1998–99	Second Division	39	15	1	0	0	0	6 (Note: Appearances in Football League Trophy)	3	46	18
Millwall	1999–2000	Second Division	38	25	1	0	2	0	3 (Note: One appearance in Football League Trophy and two in Second Division play-offs)	0	44	25
Millwall	2000–01	Second Division	42	27	3	1	3	0	2	0	50	28
Millwall	2001–02	First Division	21	4	2	0	0	0	1 (Note: Appearance in First Division play-offs)	0	24	4
Millwall	2002–03	First Division	40	12	1	0	0	0	0	0	41	12
Millwall	2003–04	First Division	38	9	7	1	1	0	0	0	45	10
Millwall	2004–05	Championship	12	1	0	0	1	0	2 (Note: Appearance in UEFA Cup)	0	15	1
Millwall	Total		233	93	15	2	7	0	14	3	268	98
Cardiff City (loan)	2004–05	Championship	3	1	0	0	0	0	0	0	3	1
Nottingham Forest	2004–05	Championship	13	0	2	0	0	0	0	0	15	0
Nottingham Forest	2005–06	League One	1	0	0	0	1	0	0	0	2	0
Nottingham Forest	2006–07	League One	19	1	0	0	1	0	2	0	22	1
Nottingham Forest	Total		33	1	2	0	2	0	2	0	38	1
Gillingham (loan)	2005–06	League One	36	6	1	0	0	0	2	0	39	6
Millwall	2006–07	League One	21	5	0	0	0	0	0	0	21	5
Millwall	2007–08	League One	27	3	2	0	1	0	0	0	30	3
Millwall	2008–09	League One	35	8	5	2	0	0	3 (Note: Appearances in League One play-offs)	1	43	11
Millwall	2009–10	League One	32	13	1	1	2	4	3	0	41	16
Millwall	2010–11	Championship	26	2	1	0	3	1	0	0	30	3
Millwall	Total		141	31	9	3	6	5	8	1	164	40
Southend United	2011–12	League Two	33	8	3	0	1	0	5 (Note: Two appearances in League Two play-offs and three in Football League Trophy)	2	42	10
Southend United	2012–13	League Two	7	0	1	0	1	0	1	0	10	0
Southend United	Total		40	8	4	0	2	0	6	2	52	10
Career total			486	140	31	5	17	5	32	6	566	156

=== Managerial statistics ===
As of match played 21 November 2026

Managerial record by team and tenure
Team	From	To	Record					Ref.
Team	From	To	P	W	D	L	Win %	Ref.
Millwall (caretaker)	26 December 2013	7 January 2014	3	0	1	2	0.0	
Millwall	10 March 2015	3 October 2019	245	102	66	77	41.6	
Cardiff City	16 November 2019	21 January 2021	62	24	18	20	38.7	
Gillingham	31 January 2022	5 October 2023	90	31	25	34	34.4	
Cambridge United	6 December 2023	21 February 2024	14	5	3	6	35.7	
Millwall	21 February 2024	14 December 2024	35	15	9	11	42.9	
Cambridge United	19 February 2025	Present	92	40	27	25	43.5	
Total			540	216	149	175	40.0	

== Honours ==
=== As a player ===
Millwall

- Football League Second Division: 2000–01
- Football League One play-offs: 2010
- FA Cup runner-up: 2003–04
- Football League Trophy runner-up: 1998–99

Individual

- Millwall Player of the Season: 1999–2000
- PFA Team of the Year: 2000–01 Second Division
- Football League One Player of the Month: February 2010

=== As a manager ===
Millwall

- EFL League One play-offs: 2017

Cambridge United

- EFL League Two third-place promotion: 2025–26

Individual

- EFL League One Manager of the Month: February 2017
- EFL League Two Manager of the Month: January 2026
