= Lycée Corneille =

Lycée Corneille may refer to:

- Lycée Corneille (La Celle-Saint-Cloud)
- Lycée Corneille (Rouen)
