= Cornil Cacheux =

French organ builder (1687–1738)

- Born: 6 January 1687; Cambrai, Cambrésis, France
- Died: 11 July 1738 (aged 51)
- Other names: Corneille Cacheux
- Known for: Pipe organ maker

Cornil (or Corneille) Cacheux (6 January 1687 – 11 July 1738) was a French pipe organ maker.

== Biography ==
Cacheux was born on 6 January 1687 in Cambrai in the north of France. He died in Arras on 11 July 1738.

== Organs ==
He started his activities around 1714.

In Artois (now France), he built the organs of Église Notre-Dame de Calais and Église Saint-Géry d'Arras (1722). He built the organ at abbaye d'Anchin in 1732, which was transferred in 1792 to the Collégiale Saint-Pierre de Douai.

In the Netherlands (now Belgium), he worked in the old bishoprics of Ghent, Bruges and Tournai between 1721 (departure of Jacob Van Eynde) and 1735 (when Andries-Jacob Berger came). He built organs at Machelen, Tielt, Sint-Eloois-Vijve, Hulste (Harelbeke), Waregem, and Sint-Lodewijk (Deerlijk). In Bruges he built organs at the Saint-Walburga Church (1735-1738), Onze-Lieve-Vrouwekerk (1723, rebuilt and expanded in neo-baroque style in 1954), and Onze-Lieve-Vrouw ter Potterie (1735, replaced in the 20th century by a lesser instrument).

=== St. Walburga Church (Bruges) ===
The 1735 commission was for an organ in the old Sint-Walburgakerk. When this church was closed and demolished, the organ was transferred in 1778 to the new church, the former Franciscus-Xaverius Church.

Cacheux just started work on this organ when he died. According to organ maker Charles-Louis Van Houtte, he had fatally swallowed a spider while working at the new organ in Tielt and died of the consequences.

The instrument was further finished under supervision of his widow, by the Lille organ makers Jean-Baptiste Frémat and J. Carlier. Early in 1739 they submitted a final design, which was accepted. The organ was already commissioned on 17 May 1739. The organ chest was built by Hendrik Pulinx the Younger. Despite the many modifications, this organ is considered one of the better of the many organs in Bruges.

== Notes and references ==
- M. Van Mackelberg, Les orgues d'Arras, in: Mémoires de l'académie des sciences, lettres et arts d'Arras, 5^{e} série, 1964.
- Ghislain Potvlieghe, Corneille Cacheux, in: Elseviers encyclopedie van Vlaanderen, Brussel, 1973.
- J.P. Felix, Sur la fin du facteur d'orgues C. Cacheux d'Arras, in: L'organiste, Hoei, 1978.
- Luc Lannoo, Het Cacheuxorgel van de Sint-Walburgakerk, in: Sint-Walburga, een Brugse kerk vol geschiedenis, Brugge, 1982. OCLC 64161704
- Luc Lanoo, Corneille Cacheux, in: Lexicon van de muziek in West-Vlaanderen, Deel 6, Brugge, 2005.
