= Gavin Grant (footballer) =

English footballer (born 1984)

- Born: 27 March 1984 (age 42); Brent, England
- Criminal charges: Murder
- Criminal penalty: Life imprisonment
Association football career
- Positions: Winger; striker
Senior career*
Years	Team	Apps	(Gls)
2005	Tooting & Mitcham	16	(10)
2005–2006	Gillingham	10	(1)
2006–2008	Millwall	4	(0)
2007	→ Grays Athletic (loan)	7	(3)
2007–2008	→ Grays Athletic (loan)	16	(2)
2008	→ Stevenage Borough (loan)	14	(7)
2008–2010	Wycombe Wanderers	10	(0)
2010	Bradford City	11	(0)
Total		88	(21)
- * Club domestic league appearances and goals

Gavin Grant (born 27 March 1984) is an English former professional footballer who was convicted in July 2010 of a murder committed in 2004. He is serving a life sentence.

== Career ==
Grant started his career at non-League Tooting & Mitcham, before being signed by Gillingham. He later joined Millwall.

He was then loaned out to Grays Athletic at the end of the 2006–07 season, scoring four times in 10 appearances in all competitions. During this time, he was under investigation for a killing related to the murder of which he was subsequently convicted, and the loan deal was cut short due to Grant breaking his curfew and being arrested again. He was later acquitted on those charges.

Grant secured another loan deal, this time season-long to Grays on 24 August 2007, however it was cut short and he returned to the Lions in January 2008. He then joined Stevenage Borough on loan in February 2008.

Grant was released by Millwall at the end of the 2007–08 season, and was signed by new Wycombe Wanderers boss Peter Taylor on a two-year contract. He was signed again by Taylor, by that time at Bradford City, on a non-contract basis on 26 February 2010.

== Conviction ==
Grant was accused of killing Jahmall Moore in 2005, but was cleared of murder in 2007. However, on 23 July 2010, Grant was found guilty, along with Gareth Downie, of killing 21-year-old Leon Labastide in May 2004. The courts heard that both incidents were part of "tit-for-tat" shootings in the Stonebridge Park estate in Harlesden. He received a life sentence, subject to a minimum of 25 years in prison.

On 31 October 2014, Grant was given right to appeal to conviction after three senior judges at the Court of Appeal had concerns over the 2010 trial as police failed to disclose important details about one of the key prosecution witnesses. However, the appeal was rejected in November 2015, the judges concluding that the evidence remained compelling.
