= Mark Corneille =

English footballer

Personal information
- Full name: Mark Paul Corneille
- Date of birth: 31 May 1986 (age 40)
- Place of birth: Camberwell, England
- Position: Defender

Senior career*
Years	Team	Apps	(Gls)
2005–2006	Gillingham	2	(0)
2005–2006	→ Eastbourne Borough (loan)	8	(1)
2006	→ Folkestone Invicta (loan)	6	(0)
2006–2010	Bromley	160	(4)
2010	Maidstone United	9	(0)
2011–2013	Margate	57	(3)
- * Club domestic league appearances and goals as of 17:08, 12 August 2015 (UTC)

Mark Paul Corneille (born 31 May 1986) is an English football player, who last played as a defender for Margate.

He began his career with Gillingham, and made his professional debut against Colchester United on 6 August 2005. At the end of the 2005–06 season he was released by the club and joined Bromley. Corneille made over 150 appearances for the "Ravens", before joining Maidstone United in March 2010 where he stayed until he departed the club in the summer of 2010.

Corneille spent the 2010–11 season out of the game due to work commitments, before signing a two-year contract with Margate on 26 July 2011.
