= Francis Collin =

English footballer

Frannie Collin
Personal information
- Full name: Francis John Patrick Collin
- Date of birth: 20 April 1987 (age 39)
- Place of birth: Chatham, England
- Position: Forward

Team information
- Current team: Faversham Town

Senior career*
Years	Team	Apps	(Gls)
2005–2007	Gillingham	9	(1)
2007–2010	Dover Athletic		
2010–2013	Tonbridge Angels		
2013–2016	Maidstone United		
2016	Leatherhead		
2016–2017	Hastings United		
2017–2019	Margate		
2019–2021	Hythe Town	41	(12)
2022	Ashford United	18	(3)
2022–2024	Hythe Town	66	(14)
2024–	Faversham Town	38	(3)

Managerial career
- 2026: Faversham Town (caretaker)
- * Club domestic league appearances and goals as of 12:39, 2 May 2026 (UTC)

Francis John Patrick Collin (born 20 April 1987) is an English professional footballer who plays as a striker for Faversham Town.

== Career ==
Collin is a former England Schoolboy under 18 international. After having trials with various clubs during his youth, including Crystal Palace and Aston Villa, he eventually signed professionally for Gillingham. He made his debut for the first team with a goal in Gillingham's 2–0 win over Crawley Town in the Football League Trophy first round. In October 2005 he signed his first professional contract with the club and scored his first league goal against Hartlepool United in a 3–1 defeat on 1 November 2005.

Collin found first team opportunities at Gillingham limited and most of his appearances came as a substitute. Collin's spell at Priestfield was ended when Gillingham released him in May 2007. He was subsequently signed by former Gillingham boss Andy Hessenthaler at Dover Athletic in June 2007, and signed a new one-year contract in May 2008. The following season saw Dover Athletic clinch the Isthmian League Premier Division title with the help of Collin's 21 goals and he extended his stay at Dover in May 2009 by signing another contract with the Kent club. He left the club at the end of the 2009–10 season to join Tonbridge Angels.

In his first season with Tonbridge, Collin bagged 21 goals in all competitions from 43 appearances, with 16 coming from 40 appearances in the league. He was named Tonbridge Angels player of the year for the 2011–12 season and won the Golden Boot for the Conference South in the same season with 29 league goals.

In the 2013 close-season, Collin announced he was leaving Tonbridge Angels after three years at the club. After much speculation, which saw the player linked with Conference South clubs Sutton United, Whitehawk and Dover Athletic, Collin signed for Maidstone United, who had just been promoted to the Isthmian League Premier Division.

On 7 January 2022, he signed for Isthmian League South East Division side Ashford United, having been without a club for over a month following his departure as player/coach for divisional rivals Hythe Town.

In June 2022, Collin returned to Hythe Town in the role of player-coach.

In June 2024, Collin joined Southern Counties East Premier Division side Faversham Town. In December 2025, he joined the coaching team as player/coach In April 2026, he was appointed caretaker manager for the remainder of the season following the sacking of Tommy Warrilow.
