= Akwasi Fobi-Edusei =

English footballer

Personal information
- Full name: Akwasi Fobi-Edusei
- Date of birth: 12 September 1986 (age 40)
- Place of birth: Camberwell, England
- Height: 5 ft 9 in (1.75 m)
- Position: Left-back

Youth career
- Gillingham

Senior career*
Years	Team	Apps	(Gls)
2005–2006	Gillingham	9	(0)
2006	Welling United	12	(0)
2006	Walton & Hersham	?	(?)
2006–2007	Ramsgate	17	(1)
2007	East Thurrock	?	(?)
2008	Tonbridge Angels	?	(?)
2008–2009	Farnborough	?	(?)
2009	Halesowen Town	1	(0)
2009	Margate	3	(1)
2009–2013	Burgess Hill Town		
2013	Hastings United	9	(1)
2013–2014	Horsham	13	(1)
2014–?	Crawley Down Gatwick	?	(?)
- * Club domestic league appearances and goals as of 18:12, 2 October 2009 (UTC)

Akwasi Fobi-Edusei (born 12 September 1986), sometimes listed as Akwasi Fobe-Edusei or simply Akwasi Edusei, is an English former professional footballer.

== Playing career ==
Born in Camberwell, London, he began his career with Gillingham, where he made 9 appearances in The Football League. He has also played on loan for Welling United and Farnborough. In 2013, he was released by Burgess Hill Town and was signed by Hastings United on a free transfer. On 28 November he joined Horsham but failed to start a match, making 13 substitute appearances, before joining Crawley Down Gatwick in March 2014.
