= Scott Weight =

English footballer

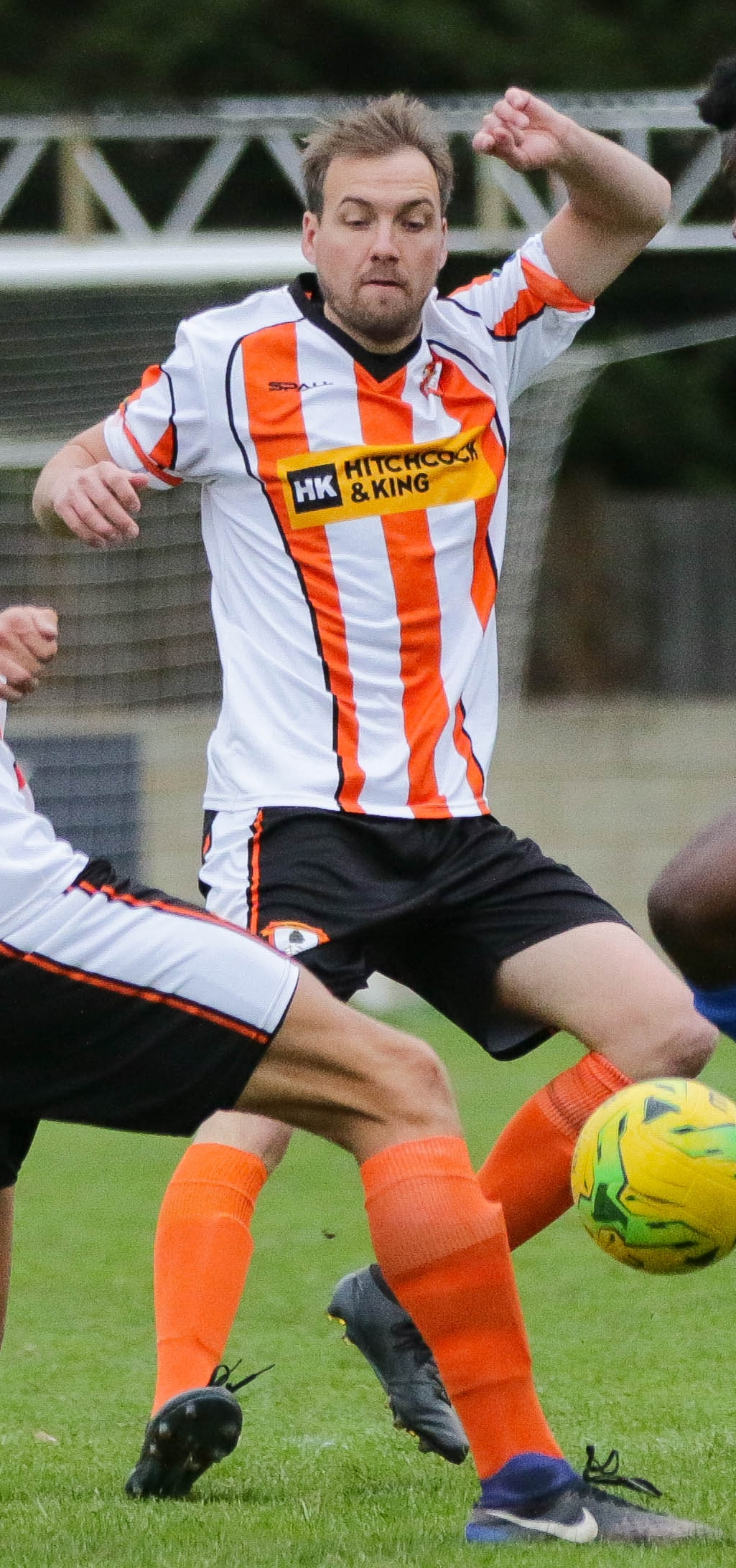
- Weight playing for Ashford Town (Middlesex) in October 2018.

Personal information
- Full name: Scott Aaron Weight
- Date of birth: 3 April 1987 (age 39)
- Place of birth: Hammersmith, England
- Positions: Midfielder; central defender

Team information
- Current team: Bedfont Sports (assistant manager)

Youth career
- 1997–2004: Brentford

Senior career*
Years	Team	Apps	(Gls)
2004–2005	Brentford	0	(0)
2005–2006	Hampton & Richmond Borough	1	(0)
2006–2014	Ashford Town (Middlesex)	124	(35)
2014	Egham Town	6	(0)
2015–2020	Ashford Town (Middlesex)	148	(6)
2020–2021	Bedfont Sports	4	(1)
2023–2024	Bedfont Sports	30	(1)
2025–	Bedfont Sports	3	(0)
- * Club domestic league appearances and goals as of 23:28, 14 June 2026 (UTC)

Scott Aaron Weight (born 3 April 1987) is an English semi-professional footballer who played as a midfielder or central defender.

Weight began his career at Brentford, for whom he made one professional appearance before dropping into non-League football upon his release in 2005. He joined Ashford Town (Middlesex) in 2006, held the captaincy and was one of the club's longest serving players before his departure in 2014. Weight had a second spell for the club between 2015 and 2020. Weight is described as a "tough tackling midfield player who can also revert to central defender as and when needed".

== Playing career ==
=== Brentford ===
Weight began his career as a youth at Brentford and joined the club's Centre Of Excellence at the age of 10. His maiden call into the first team squad came for a Football League Trophy first round match against Milton Keynes Dons on 28 September 2004. He made his professional debut in the match, coming on as a substitute for Ryan Peters after 82 minutes of the 3–0 defeat. It was Weight's only involvement for the first team and he was released at the end of the 2004–05 season.

=== Hampton & Richmond Borough ===
Weight signed for Isthmian League Premier Division club Hampton & Richmond Borough during the 2005 off-season. He made only one league appearance for the club, coming on as an injury time substitute for Francis Quarm in a 2–0 win over Hendon on 27 August.

=== Ashford Town (Middlesex) ===
Weight joined Southern League First Division West club Ashford Town (Middlesex) midway through the 2005–06 season and made four league appearances in February 2006. Following promotion to the Isthmian League Premier Division, Weight made 12 appearances during the 2006–07 season and helped the Tangerines win the Isthmian League Cup. He made 24 appearances and scored one goal during the 2007–08 season. Weight made only 12 appearances during the 2008–09 season, but won the Surrey Senior Cup with the team.

Weight made 35 appearances and was the 2009–10 Ashford Town Player Of Year, but the season ended on a sour note after the Tangerines suffered relegation to the Southern League First Division Central. He made sporadic appearances during the 2010–11 and 2011–12 seasons, due to work commitments, but won the Aldershot Senior Cup with the team. Weight was fully available during the 2012–13 season, making 39 appearances and scoring 2 goals. In a poor 2013–14 season (which saw the Tangerines relegated to the Combined Counties League Premier Division with a bottom-place finish), he won the Players' Player Of The Year award. Weight departed the club after the season.

=== Egham Town ===
Weight joined Southern League First Division Central club Egham Town during the 2014 off-season. He made just seven appearances during the opening month of the 2014–15 season, before suffering a broken ankle during a 1–0 defeat to Abingdon United on 30 August 2014.

=== Return to Ashford Town (Middlesex) ===
In July 2015, Weight returned to Combined Counties League Premier Division club Ashford Town (Middlesex) and made 32 appearances during the promotion-winning 2015–16 season. He played on through the 2016–17 and 2017–18 Southern League First Division seasons and as of September 2017, had made over 200 league appearances for the club. In May 2019, Weight was named as player-assistant to new manager Russell Canderton and he made 31 appearances during the abandoned 2019–20 season, which was his last with the club.

=== Bedfont Sports ===
Weight began the 2020–21 season with Isthmian League South Central Division club Bedfont Sports. As a result of the 2020–21 Isthmian League season being declared null and void in February 2021, Weight finished the campaign with six appearances and one goal. He resumed his career with the club in September 2023 and made 33 appearances during a 2023–24 Combined Counties League Premier Division North season which culminated in defeat in the promotion playoffs. Weight later returned to the club as assistant manager.

=== Sunday league football ===
Weight made appearances for Chiswick & District Sunday League Veterans Premier Division club Shire United Veterans First during the 2021–22 season.

== Career statistics ==
As of match played 2 May 2026

Appearances and goals by club, season and competition
Club	Season	League			FA Cup		League Cup		Other		Total	
Club	Season	Division	Apps	Goals	Apps	Goals	Apps	Goals	Apps	Goals	Apps	Goals
Brentford	2004–05	League One	0	0	0	0	0	0	1 (Note: Appearance in Football League Trophy)	0	1	0
Hampton & Richmond Borough	2005–06	Isthmian League Premier Division	1	0	—		—		—		1	0
Ashford Town (Middlesex)	2005–06	Southern League First Division West	4	1	—		—		—		4	1
Ashford Town (Middlesex)	2006–07	Isthmian League Premier Division	11	1	0	0	—		2 (Note: 1 appearance in Isthmian League Cup, 1 appearance in FA Trophy)	0	13	1
Ashford Town (Middlesex)	2007–08	Isthmian League Premier Division	14	1	0	0	—		2 (Note: Appearances in Isthmian League Cup)	0	16	1
Ashford Town (Middlesex)	2008–09	Isthmian League Premier Division	7	0	0	0	—		2	0	9	0
Ashford Town (Middlesex)	2009–10	Isthmian League Premier Division	32	2	2	0	—		1	0	35	2
Ashford Town (Middlesex)	Total		64	4	2	0	—		7	0	73	4
Egham Town	2014–15	Southern League First Division Central	6	0	1	0	—		0	0	7	0
Ashford Town (Middlesex)	2015–16	Combined Counties League Premier Division	33	2	0	0	—		5 (Note: 4 appearances in Combined Counties League Premier Challenge Cup, 1 appearance in Middlesex Senior Charity Cup)	0	38	2
Ashford Town (Middlesex)	2018–19	Isthmian League South Central Division	26	0	1	0	—		4 (Note: Appearance(s) in FA Trophy)	0	31	0
Ashford Town (Middlesex)	2019–20	Isthmian League South Central Division	25	0	1	0	—		5 (Note: 4 appearances in Isthmian League Cup, 1 appearance in FA Trophy)	0	31	0
Ashford Town (Middlesex)	Total		148	6	4	0	—		21	0	173	6
Bedfont Sports	2020–21	Isthmian League South Central Division	4	1	1	0	—		1	0	6	1
Bedfont Sports	2023–24	Combined Counties League Premier Division North	30	1	0	0	—		3 (Note: 2 appearances in Combined Counties League Premier Division North play-offs, 1 appearance in FA Vase)	0	33	1
Bedfont Sports	2025–26	Isthmian League South Central Division	3	0	0	0	—		1	0	4	0
Bedfont Sports	Total		37	2	1	0	—		5	0	43	2
Career total			192	8	6	0	0	0	27	0	225	8

== Honours ==
Ashford Town (Middlesex)

- Combined Counties League Premier Division second-place promotion: 2015–16
- Isthmian League Cup: 2006–07
- Surrey Senior Cup: 2008–09
- Aldershot Senior Cup: 2011–12

Individual

- Ashford Town (Middlesex) Player Of The Year: 2009–10
- Ashford Town (Middlesex) Players' Player Of The Year: 2013–14
