= Luke Muldowney =

English footballer (born 1986)

Personal information
- Full name: Luke John Muldowney
- Date of birth: 31 July 1986 (age 40)
- Place of birth: Ashford, England
- Height: 1.70 m (5 ft 7 in)
- Position: Midfielder

Team information
- Current team: Potters Bar Town (first team coach)

Youth career
- 2002–2004: Brentford

Senior career*
Years	Team	Apps	(Gls)
2004–2005	Brentford	0	(0)
2004–2005	→ Kingstonian (loan)	4	(0)
2005	→ Staines Town (loan)	2	(0)
2005	Staines Town	8	(0)
2005–2007	Chertsey Town	59	(8)
2007–2008	Wealdstone	13	(1)
2007–2008	→ Chertsey Town (loan)	22	(0)
2008–2009	Chertsey Town	33	(2)
2009–2015	Egham Town	207	(18)
2015–2018	Hanworth Villa	91	(3)
2018–2019	Abbey Rangers	7	(0)

Managerial career
- 2014–2015: Egham Town (player-manager)
- * Club domestic league appearances and goals

Luke John Muldowney (born 31 July 1986) is an English semi-professional footballer who is first team coach at Potters Bar Town. A midfielder, Muldowney began his career at Brentford, for whom he made one professional appearance before dropping into non-League football upon his release in 2005. He spent six years as a player, captain and latterly manager at non-League club Egham Town.

== Playing career ==
=== Brentford ===
Palmer began his career as a youth at Brentford and embarked on a scholarship at the beginning of the 2002–03 season. His maiden call into the first team squad came for a Football League Trophy first round match against Milton Keynes Dons on 28 September 2004. Muldowney made his only appearance for the club as a substitute for Stephen Hunt at half time during the 3–0 defeat. Muldowney was called into the first team squad again on 30 October and was an unused substitute for a 1–0 defeat to Tranmere Rovers. It was Muldowney's final involvement for the first team and he joined Isthmian League Premier Division club Kingstonian on a work experience loan in December 2004. He made six appearances for the club before returning to Griffin Park in March. After a further loan away, Muldowney was released at the end of the 2004–05 season.

=== Staines Town ===
In March 2005, Muldowney joined Isthmian League Premier Division club Staines Town on loan until the end of the 2004–05 season. He made just one appearance before returning to Brentford at the end of the season. After an unsuccessful trial at Championship club Reading, Muldowney signed for Staines Town permanently during the 2005 off-season, but managed only eight appearances before departing in October 2005.

=== Chertsey Town ===
Muldowney joined Isthmian League Second Division club Chertsey Town in October 2005. He made 18 appearances during the 2005–06 season. With the Curfews reassigned to the Combined Counties League Premier Division for the 2006–07 season, Muldowney was a virtual ever-present, making 49 appearances and scoring 9 goals.

=== Wealdstone ===
Muldowney transferred to Isthmian League Premier Division club Wealdstone in July 2007. He made 22 appearances during the 2007–08 season.

=== Return to Chertsey Town ===
Muldowney returned to Chertsey Town on loan in December 2007, a move which was later turned into a permanent signing. He made 22 appearances during the 2007–08 season and scored no goals. A broken toe disrupted the second half of Muldowney's 2008–09 season and he was denied the chance to win the first silverware of his career after Chertsey were removed from the Premier Challenge Cup Final, for fielding an ineligible player in their semi-final win over Worcester Park. Muldowney made 41 appearances during the 2008–09 season and scored four goals.

=== Egham Town ===
Muldowney transferred to Combined Counties League Premier Division club Egham Town during the 2009 off-season. He had a first successful first season with Egham, making 41 appearances and scoring three goals as the Sarnies achieved a fourth-place finish in the league. After a mediocre 2010–11 season which saw the Sarnies finish 13th (though Muldowney improved his goal tally to four), they made a challenge for the title in the 2011–12 season, with Muldowney making 47 appearances. Everything came right for the club in the 2012–13 season, with Muldowney making 45 appearances and scoring five goals on the way to the Combined Counties League Premier Division title. The winning goal and the man of the match award in the final day victory over Bedfont Sports capped Muldowney's season. He made 40 appearances and scored two goals during a mid-table 2013–14 season, before dropping to 24 appearances and one goal in 2014–15 and departing in February 2015.

=== Hanworth Villa ===
Muldowney joined Combined Counties League Premier Division club Hanworth Villa during the 2014–15 season. He played through to the 2017–18 season and was a part of the club's 2018 Middlesex Senior Charity Cup Final-winning squad.

=== Abbey Rangers ===
Muldowney made 8 appearances for Combined Counties League Premier Division club Abbey Rangers during the 2018–19 season.

== Managerial and coaching career ==
=== Egham Town ===
In October 2014, Muldowney was named as player-manager of Southern League First Division Central club Egham Town, with Richie Byrne as his assistant. He remained in charge until being replaced by Koo Dumbuya in February 2015.

=== Hanworth Villa ===
Muldowney was named as player-assistant manager at Combined Counties League Premier Division club Hanworth Villa in 2015. He and the entire management team stepped down after the club's Middlesex Senior Charity Cup win at the end of the 2015–16 season.

=== Potters Bar Town ===
During the 2019 off-season, Muldowney was appointed as first team coach at Isthmian League Premier Division club Potters Bar Town.

== Sunday League ==
Muldowney linked up with former Brentford youth teammates Mark Scotchford, Barry Marchena and brother Charlie Muldowney to make seven appearances for West Middlesex Sunday Football League club Green Man Rangers in 2011.

== Personal life ==
Muldowney's brother Jamie and cousin Charlie were also products of the Centre of Excellence at Brentford.

== Career statistics ==
Appearances and goals by club, season and competition
Club	Season	League			FA Cup		League Cup		Other		Total	
Club	Season	Division	Apps	Goals	Apps	Goals	Apps	Goals	Apps	Goals	Apps	Goals
Brentford	2004–05	League One	0	0	0	0	0	0	1 (Note: Appearances in Football League Trophy)	0	1	0
Kingstonian (loan)	2004–05	Isthmian League Premier Division	4	0	—		—		2 (Note: 1 appearance in Isthmian League Cup, 1 appearance in Surrey Senior Cup)	0	6	0
Staines Town (loan)	2004–05	Isthmian League Premier Division	2	0	—		—		—		2	0
Staines Town	2005–06	Isthmian League Premier Division	8	0	0	0	—		0	0	8	0
Staines Town	Total		10	0	0	0	—		0	0	10	0
Chertsey Town	2005–06	Isthmian League Second Division	17	0	—		—		1 (Note: Appearance in Isthmian League Associate Members Trophy)	0	18	0
Chertsey Town	2006–07	Combined Counties League Premier Division	42	8	2	0	—		5 (Note: Appearances in Combined Counties League Premier Challenge Cup)	1	49	9
Chertsey Town	Total		59	8	2	0	—		6	1	67	9
Wealdstone	2007–08	Isthmian League Premier Division	13	1	4	1	—		6 (Note: 3 appearances in FA Trophy, 2 appearances in Isthmian League Cup, 1 appearance in Middlesex Senior Cup)	0	23	2
Chertsey Town	2007–08	Combined Counties League Premier Division	22	0	—		—		—		22	0
Chertsey Town	2008–09	Combined Counties League Premier Division	34	2	3	1	—		4 (Note: 2 appearances and 1 goal in Surrey Senior Cup, 1 appearance in FA Vase, 1 appearance in Combined Counties League Premier Challenge Cup)	1	41	4
Chertsey Town	Total		115	10	5	1	—		10	2	130	13
Egham Town	2009–10	Combined Counties League Premier Division	39	3	—		—		2	0	41	3
Egham Town	2010–11	Combined Counties League Premier Division	37	4	—		—		3	0	40	4
Egham Town	2011–12	Combined Counties League Premier Division	40	3	3	0	—		4 (Note: 3 appearances in FA Vase, 1 appearance in Combined Counties League Premier Challenge Cup)	0	47	3
Egham Town	2012–13	Combined Counties League Premier Division	41	5	—		—		4	0	45	5
Egham Town	2013–14	Southern League First Division Central	32	2	1	0	—		7 (Note: 4 appearances in Surrey Senior Cup, 2 appearances in FA Trophy, 1 appearance in Southern League Cup)	0	40	2
Egham Town	2014–15	Southern League First Division Central	18	1	1	0	—		5 (Note: 2 appearances in FA Trophy, 2 appearances in Southern League Cup, 1 appearance in Surrey Senior Cup)	0	24	1
Egham Town	Total		207	18	5	0	—		25	0	237	18
Hanworth Villa	2014–15	Combined Counties League Premier Division	6	1	—		—		—		6	1
Hanworth Villa	2015–16	Combined Counties League Premier Division	37	2	1	0	—		7 (Note: 3 appearances in FA Vase, 2 appearances in Middlesex Senior Charity Cup, 1 appearance in Middlesex Senior Cup, 1 appearance in Southern Combination Cup)	0	45	2
Hanworth Villa	2016–17	Combined Counties League Premier Division	26	0	3	0	—		5 (Note: 1 appearance in FA Vase, 1 appearance in Middlesex Senior Cup, 1 appearance in Middlesex Senior Charity Cup, 1 appearance in Combined Counties League Premier Challenge Cup, 1 appearance in Southern Combination Cup)	0	34	0
Hanworth Villa	2017–18	Combined Counties League Premier Division	22	0	0	0	—		1	0	23	0
Hanworth Villa	Total		91	3	4	0	—		13	0	108	3
Abbey Rangers	2018–19	Combined Counties League Premier Division	7	0	0	0	—		1	0	8	0
Career total			447	32	18	2	0	0	58	2	523	36

== Honours ==
Egham Town

- Combined Counties League Premier Division: 2012–13

Hanworth Villa

- Middlesex Senior Charity Cup: 2017–18
