= Sean Hillier =

English footballer (born 1986)

Personal information
- Date of birth: 19 April 1986 (age 40)
- Place of birth: Hammersmith, England
- Position: Defender

Team information
- Current team: Maidenhead United Women (assistant)

Youth career
- 2002–2004: Brentford

Senior career*
| Years | Team | Apps | (Gls) |
| 2004–2005 | Brentford | 0 | (0) |
| 2004 | → Welling United (loan) | 1 | (0) |
| 2005 | → Hendon (loan) | 1 | (0) |
| 2005 | → North Greenford United (loan) | 11 | (2) |
| 2005–2006 | AFC Wimbledon | 1 | (0) |
| 2005–2006 | → North Greenford United (loan) | 25 | (4) |
| 2006–2007 | Hanwell Town | | |
| 2007–2008 | North Greenford United | 42 | (3) |
| 2008 | Chertsey Town | 8 | (0) |
| 2008–2013 | North Greenford United | 187 | (7) |
| 2015–2016 | New Hanford | 20 | (2) |
| 2017–2019 | North Greenford United | 50 | (1) |
- * Club domestic league appearances and goals

Sean Hillier (born 19 April 1986) is an English former semi-professional footballer who played as a defender.

Hillier began his playing career at Brentford and made one professional appearance before dropping into non-League football upon his release in 2005. He played the majority of his career for North Greenford United and made over 250 appearances across five spells with the club. He is currently assistant coach of Maidenhead United Women.

== Playing career ==
=== Brentford ===
Hillier began his career as a youth at Brentford and embarked on a scholarship at the beginning 2002–03 season. He played in the 2–0 2004 Supporters Direct Cup win over AFC Wimbledon on 20 July 2004 and replaced Chris Hargreaves after 87 minutes. Hillier received his maiden call into the first team squad for a Football League Trophy first round match against Milton Keynes Dons on 28 September 2004. Hillier made his professional debut when he started the match at right back and played the full 90 minutes of the 3–0 defeat. He was an unused substitute in two further first team matches during the 2004–05 season. Either side of his brief period of involvement with the first team squad, Hillier spent periods away on loan at non-League clubs Welling United, Hendon and North Greenford United. He was released at the end of the 2004–05 season.

=== AFC Wimbledon ===
Hillier signed for Isthmian League Premier Division club AFC Wimbledon on 30 July 2005. He made his only first team appearance for the club as a 51st-minute substitute for Michael Woolner in a 2–0 defeat to Bromley on 25 October 2005 and departed at the end of the 2005–06 season. Hillier rejoined Combined Counties League Premier Division club North Greenford United on loan in November 2005, until the end of the 2005–06 season. He made 28 appearances during his spell and scored a seasonal-best five goals.

=== Hanwell Town ===
Hillier signed for Southern League First Division South & West club Hanwell Town during the 2006 off-season. He left the club in early 2007.

=== Third spell with North Greenford United ===
Hillier rejoined North Greenford United for the third time in January 2007. He helped the Blues to the 2007 Premier Challenge Cup Final versus Merstham, but suffered a 4–1 defeat. He made 21 appearances and scored one goal during the 2006–07 season. He departed the Blues in February 2008, having made 46 appearances and scored three goals during his year with the club.

=== Chertsey Town ===
Hillier signed for Combined Counties League Premier Division club Chertsey Town on 27 February 2008 and made eight appearances during the remainder of the 2007–08 season, before departing the club.

=== Fourth and fifth spells with North Greenford United ===
Hillier signed for North Greenford United for the fourth time during the 2008 off-season and was a virtual ever-present during the 2008–09 season, making 42 appearances and helping the Blues to a second-place finish in the Combined Counties League Premier Division. Hillier won the first competitive silverware of his career during the 2009–10 season, with the Combined Counties League Premier Division title (which brought promotion to the Southern League First Division Central) and the Middlesex Senior Charity Cup. The cup win set up a match versus Middlesex Senior Cup winners Staines Town for the George Ruffell Memorial Shield in August 2010, but though Hillier got on the scoresheet, the Blues were denied more silverware after suffering a shootout defeat.

Playing Southern League First Division Central football for the 2010–11 season, Hillier made 50 appearances and scored one goal in a season of consolidation. Hillier played through until the end of the 2012–13 season, which was his last with the club until his return in 2017. In the interim, he played for Middlesex County League Premier Division club New Hanford and spent time recovering from a tendon injury.

== Coaching career ==
In April 2019, Hillier was named as assistant to Brentford Women head coach Karleigh Osborne. He served in the role until July 2025, when he became assistant to manager Dave Kitson at Maidenhead United Women. Hillier is also a coach alongside Osborne at 24 Football Academy in Northolt.

== Career statistics ==
Appearances and goals by club, season and competition
| Club | Season | League | | | FA Cup | | League Cup | | Other | | Total | |
| Club | Season | Division | Apps | Goals | Apps | Goals | Apps | Goals | Apps | Goals | Apps | Goals |
|---|---|---|---|---|---|---|---|---|---|---|---|---|
| Brentford | 2004–05 | League One | 0 | 0 | 0 | 0 | 0 | 0 | 1 (Note: Appearance in Football League Trophy) | 0 | 1 | 0 |
| Hendon (loan) | 2004–05 | Isthmian League Premier Division | 1 | 0 | — | | — | | 1 (Note: Appearance in Isthmian League Cup) | 0 | 2 | 0 |
| North Greenford United (loan) | 2004–05 | Combined Counties League Premier Division | 11 | 2 | — | | — | | — | | 11 | 2 |
| AFC Wimbledon | 2005–06 | Isthmian League Premier Division | 1 | 0 | 0 | 0 | — | | 0 | 0 | 1 | 0 |
| North Greenford United (loan) | 2005–06 | Combined Counties League Premier Division | 25 | 4 | — | | — | | 3 (Note: Appearances in Combined Counties League Premier Challenge Cup) | 1 | 28 | 5 |
| North Greenford United | 2006–07 | Combined Counties League Premier Division | 18 | 1 | — | | — | | 3 | 0 | 21 | 1 |
| North Greenford United | 2007–08 | Combined Counties League Premier Division | 24 | 2 | — | | — | | 1 | 0 | 25 | 2 |
| North Greenford United | Total | | 42 | 3 | — | | — | | 4 | 0 | 49 | 3 |
| Chertsey Town | 2007–08 | Combined Counties League Premier Division | 8 | 0 | — | | — | | — | | 8 | 0 |
| North Greenford United | 2008–09 | Combined Counties League Premier Division | 40 | 1 | — | | — | | 2 | 0 | 42 | 1 |
| North Greenford United | 2009–10 | Combined Counties League Premier Division | 42 | 1 | — | | — | | 5 (Note: 2 appearances in Combined Counties League Premier Challenge Cup, 1 appearance in FA Vase, 1 appearance in Middlesex Senior Cup, 1 appearance in Middlesex Senior Charity Cup) | 0 | 47 | 1 |
| North Greenford United | 2010–11 | Southern League First Division Central | 38 | 1 | 5 | 0 | — | | 7 (Note: 3 appearances in Southern League Cup, 2 appearances in FA Trophy, 1 appearance in Middlesex Senior Cup, 1 appearance in Middlesex Senior Charity Cup) | 0 | 50 | 1 |
| North Greenford United | 2011–12 | Southern League First Division Central | 30 | 3 | 5 | 0 | — | | 10 (Note: 4 appearances in Southern League Cup, 4 appearances in Middlesex Senior Cup, 1 appearance in FA Trophy, 1 appearance in Middlesex Senior Charity Cup) | 0 | 45 | 3 |
| North Greenford United | 2012–13 | Southern League First Division Central | 37 | 1 | 1 | 0 | — | | 5 (Note: 2 appearances in Southern League Cup, 2 appearances in Middlesex Senior Cup, 1 appearance in FA Trophy) | 0 | 43 | 1 |
| North Greenford United | Total | | 187 | 7 | 11 | 0 | — | | 29 | 0 | 227 | 7 |
| New Hanford | 2015–16 | Middlesex County League Premier Division | 20 | 2 | — | | — | | 2 (Note: 1 appearance in Middlesex Intermediate Cup, 1 appearance in Middlesex County League Premier Division Cup) | 0 | 22 | 2 |
| North Greenford United | 2017–18 | Combined Counties League Premier Division | 33 | 1 | 0 | 0 | — | | 5 (Note: 2 appearances in Combined Counties League Premier Challenge Cup, 1 appearance in FA Vase, 1 appearance in Middlesex Senior Cup, 1 appearance in Middlesex Senior Charity Cup) | 0 | 38 | 1 |
| North Greenford United | 2018–19 | Spartan South Midlands League Premier Division | 17 | 0 | 2 | 0 | — | | 3 (Note: 2 appearances in FA Vase, 1 appearance in Middlesex Senior Charity Cup) | 0 | 22 | 0 |
| North Greenford United | Total | | 315 | 17 | 13 | 0 | — | | 44 | 1 | 372 | 18 |
| Career total | | | 345 | 19 | 13 | 0 | 0 | 0 | 48 | 1 | 406 | 20 |

== Honours ==
Brentford

- Supporters Direct Cup: 2004

North Greenford United

- Combined Counties League Premier Division: 2009–10
- Middlesex Senior Charity Cup: 2009–10

Individual

- North Greenford United Player of the Year: 2010–11
