= Sam Sodje =

English-Nigerian footballer

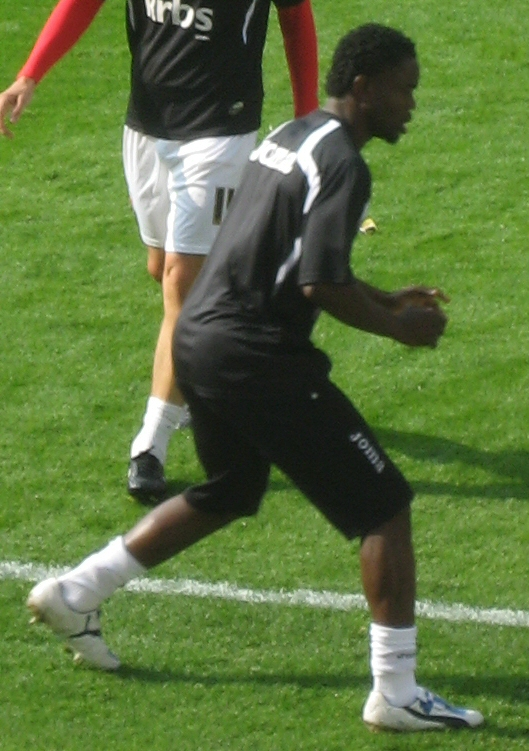
- Sodje training with Charlton Athletic in 2009.

Personal information
- Full name: Okeremute Samuel Sodje
- Date of birth: 25 May 1979 (age 47)
- Place of birth: Greenwich, London, England
- Position: Centre back

Senior career*
Years	Team	Apps	(Gls)
1998–2002	Stevenage Borough	29	(3)
2002–2004	Margate	68	(8)
2004–2006	Brentford	83	(12)
2006–2009	Reading	3	(0)
2007	→ West Bromwich Albion (loan)	7	(2)
2007–2008	→ Charlton Athletic (loan)	27	(2)
2008	→ Watford (loan)	1	(0)
2009	→ Leeds United (loan)	8	(0)
2009–2010	Charlton Athletic	27	(4)
2010	Skoda Xanthi	4	(0)
2010–2012	Notts County	27	(2)
2013	Portsmouth	9	(0)
Total		293	(32)

International career
2005–2009	Nigeria	5	(0)
- * Club domestic league appearances and goals

Okeremute Samuel Sodje (born 25 May 1979) is a former professional footballer who played as a centre back.

Born in England to Nigerian parents, Sodje represented Nigeria at international level.

== Club career ==
=== Early years ===
Sodje was born in Greenwich, London and joined Margate at the beginning of the 2002–03 season and scored on his debut with a header. He won the Supporters' Player of the Year award at the end of his first season with Margate.

In the summer of 2003, he went on trial at Yeovil Town and Chester City, but neither team signed him. He returned to Margate to play Conference football for the 2003–04 season and impressed once again.

=== Brentford ===
At the beginning of the 2004–05 season, he moved from Margate to League One side Brentford on a free transfer. He became popular with the Brentford fans through a combination of his goal-scoring, and his crazy hairstyles. At the end of that season he won a local newspaper award for player of the season, and at the end of the 2005–06 season he was honoured with a place in the PFA League One team of the year.

=== Reading ===
It was revealed Sodje had turned down a move to Southampton on 31 January 2006, the final day of the transfer window. Much transfer speculation followed until it was announced on 12 July 2006 that Sodje would join Reading, subject to a medical; the transfer was completed on 14 July 2006.

Sodje made his Reading début away to Wigan Athletic on 26 August 2006 because of a suspension to Ibrahima Sonko, and scored his first Reading goal against Burnley in the FA Cup on 9 January 2007. However, his first team opportunities in the 2006–07 proved to be limited, so on 16 March 2007 he signed a month's loan deal with West Bromwich Albion, which was subsequently extended to the end of the 2006–07 season. Whilst there, he helped The Baggies to a place in the Championship Playoff Final, which they lost 1–0 to Derby County. He scored once for West Brom, in a 2–1 win over Norwich City on 9 April 2007.

In the summer 2007 transfer window, Sheffield Wednesday agreed a fee with Reading for Sodje, with Sodje given the opportunity to think over the move. However, Sodje eventually joined Charlton Athletic on loan for the remainder of the 2007–08 season. He made his Charlton début in the club's 2–0 victory over Norwich City as a late substitute on 18 September 2007. His performance in Charlton's 3–1 home win over Ipswich Town on 8 December 2007 earned him a place in the Championship Team of the Week.

In September 2008, Sodje joined fellow Championship side Watford on a month's loan as cover for the team's injuries. He played in one game away at Sheffield United before returning to Reading after aggravating a knee injury.

=== Leeds United (loan) ===
On 26 March 2009, Sodje joined Leeds United on loan for a month with an option to extend the loan until the end of the 2008–09 season, after impressing in his first month the loan was extended until the end of the season. Sodje partnered Richard Naylor at centre back and formed a strong partnership with him during his loan spell, even though Sodje only played 8 times during his loan spell with Leeds including the playoff semi finals against Millwall

=== Second spell at Charlton Athletic ===
On 28 May 2009, Reading told Sodje that he was free to leave the club. Sodje returned on a free transfer to the club he was on loan with two-seasons prior, Charlton Athletic. Sodje made his full début in the 0–0 game at his former club Leeds United. The club being local to his birthplace of Greenwich, he stated that the club was 'in my blood'. On 14 November, Sodje's brother Akpo, joined him at the club on loan from Sheffield Wednesday. Sodje was part of the Charlton side which reached the League 1 playoffs, they were knocked out of the playoffs after losing on penalties to Swindon Town. Sodje missed the two semi finals after suffering an injury. In total Sodje scored four goals for Charlton during the 2009–10 season.

=== Skoda Xanthi ===
In July 2010, Sodje joined Greek club Skoda Xanthi, the club also signed George Boateng. However Sodje was released from his contract only a month after joining Xanthi.

On 18 August, Sodje joined Portsmouth on trial. After finishing his trial at Portsmouth, Milton Keynes Dons were linked with a move for the player. Then on 14 October, Sodje joined Sheffield Wednesday on trial, his brother Akpo Sodje used to play for the Owls. After picking up niggling injuries whilst on trial at Sheffield Wednesday, the Owl's decided not to sign Sodje.

=== Notts County ===
On 29 October 2010, Sodje became new manager Paul Ince's first signing at Notts County, joining them on a free transfer. He made his County début on 6 November in an FA Cup 1st round match against Gateshead.

In May 2012 he was released by the club, along with 12 other players.

=== Portsmouth ===
On 18 January 2013, he went on a trial at Portsmouth. Six days later, he signed a one-month deal with the club. He made his debut in a 3–2 home defeat to Colchester United on 2 February 2013.

== International career ==
Although born in England, Sodje's family originate from Nigeria so was eligible to represent both England and Nigeria national football team, he chose to represent Nigeria the same as his older brother Efe.

In November 2005, Sodje made his debut for Nigeria in a 3–0 friendly defeat to Romania in Bucharest, playing the full 90 minutes. After some impressive performances for Leeds United Sodje was recalled to the Nigerian squad for friendlies against the Republic of Ireland and France at the end of the 08/09 season. He started both games and played the full 90 minutes each. Sodje made his competitive debut for Nigeria in June 2009, starting in a 3–0 CAF third round 2010 FIFA World Cup qualifying win over Kenya in June 2009.

== Personal life ==
Born in Greenwich, London, his family originate from Warri, in Delta State, Nigeria. Sodje has four brothers who also play football; three of them professionally and one semi-professionally. Akpo, Efe, the eldest of the four, who also has represented Nigeria at international level. Steve, the third brother has never played a Football League game. Another brother, Bright, used to play rugby league and rugby union. His nephew Onome Sodje, also played professionally in England. Sodje is also related to current Leyton Orient midfielder Harrison Sodje. During the 2026 FIFA World Cup, Sodje worked as a football pundit, analyzing group stage matches and publicly commenting on African teams' tactical performances, including Cape Verde's defensive display against Spain and Tunisia's mid-tournament coaching change.

== Legal issues ==
=== Match fixing allegation ===
On 23 February 2013, Sodje was sent off for punching Oldham Athletic's Jose Baxter in the groin. In December 2013, a report by The Sun on Sunday suggested that Sodje intentionally attempted to get sent off to receive a cash payment. Sodje allegedly admitted to having been paid £70,000 to be sent off in the match.

=== Money laundering allegation ===
In January 2019, Sodje was alleged to have laundered money from a scam in 2013, in which companies in Colombia, India and Italy were tricked into handing over money by fraudsters who sent emails posing as the firms' suppliers. Later that month, after a trial at the Old Bailey in London, he was found not guilty of two charges and cleared of a further two charges.

== Honours ==
- PFA Team of the Year: 2005–06 Football League One
- Brentford Supporters' Player of the Year: 2004–05
