= Josh Lennie =

English footballer (born 1986)

Personal information
- Full name: Joshua Lennie
- Date of birth: 26 March 1986 (age 40)
- Place of birth: Oxford, England
- Position: Goalkeeper

Youth career
- 2002–2004: Brentford

Senior career*
Years	Team	Apps	(Gls)
2004–2005	Brentford	0	(0)
2004	→ Chertsey Town (loan)		
2004–2005	→ Carshalton Athletic (loan)	3	(0)
2005	→ Maidenhead United (loan)	1	(0)
2005–2006	AFC Wimbledon	2	(0)
2006–2007	Harrow Borough	1	(0)
2007	→ North Greenford United (loan)	19	(0)
2007	Harrow Borough	2	(0)
2007	Chalfont St Peter	1	(0)
2007	Molesey	0	(0)
2007–2008	Harrow Borough	9	(0)
2008	Chertsey Town	7	(0)
2008–2009	Carshalton Athletic	0	(0)
2010	Dorking Wanderers		
2010	Hayes & Yeading United	9	(0)
2010	Salford City		
2010–2011	Skelmersdale United		
2011	Chester	1	(0)
2011	Bedfont Town		
2012	Dorking Wanderers		
2013	Wingate & Finchley		
- * Club domestic league appearances and goals

Joshua Lennie (born 23 March 1986) is an English retired semi-professional footballer who played as a goalkeeper in non-League football. A product of the Brentford youth system, he made one professional appearance for the club in 2004.

== Career ==
=== Brentford ===
Lennie began his career as a junior at Brentford and embarked on a scholarship at the beginning of the 2002–03 season. He received his maiden call into the first team squad for a Football League Trophy first round match versus Barnet on 14 October 2003 and remained an unused substitute during the shootout win. Lennie was an unused substitute on another four occasions during the 2003–04 season. Lennie made his professional debut in a Football League Trophy first round match versus Milton Keynes Dons on 28 September 2004. With the game already lost at 3–0, Lennie came on as a half-time substitute for Alan Julian. He was called into the first team squad on another six occasions during the 2004–05 season, but did not play. Lennie was released at the end of the 2004–05 season.

=== Non-League football ===
After his release from Brentford, Lennie dropped into non-League football. He played for AFC Wimbledon, Harrow Borough, Molesey, Chalfont St Peter, Carshalton Athletic (two spells), Chertsey Town (two spells), Skelmersdale United, Hayes & Yeading United, Salford City, Dorking Wanderers, Bedfont Town, Chester and Wingate & Finchley.

== Personal life ==
Until June 2021, Lennie coached at Connecticut FC.

== Career statistics ==
Appearances and goals by club, season and competition
Club	Season	League			FA Cup		League Cup		Other		Total	
Club	Season	Division	Apps	Goals	Apps	Goals	Apps	Goals	Apps	Goals	Apps	Goals
Brentford	2003–04	Second Division	0	0	0	0	0	0	0	0	0	0
Brentford	2004–05	League One	0	0	0	0	0	0	1 (Note: Appearances in Football League Trophy)	0	1	0
Brentford	Total		0	0	0	0	0	0	1	0	1	0
Carshalton Athletic (loan)	2004–05	Conference South	3	0	—		—		—		3	0
Maidenhead United (loan)	2004–05	Conference South	1	0	—		—		—		1	0
AFC Wimbledon	2005–06	Isthmian League Premier Division	2	0	0	0	—		3 (Note: 1 appearance in Isthmian League Cup, 1 appearance in Surrey Senior Cup, 1 appearance in London Senior Cup)	0	5	0
AFC Wimbledon	2006–07	Isthmian League Premier Division	0	0	0	0	—		0	0	0	0
AFC Wimbledon	Total		2	0	0	0	—		3	0	5	0
Harrow Borough	2006–07	Isthmian League Premier Division	1	0	—		—		0	0	1	0
North Greenford United (loan)	2006–07	Combined Counties League Premier Division	19	0	—		—		3 (Note: Appearances in Combined Counties League Premier Challenge Cup)	0	22	0
Harrow Borough	2007–08	Isthmian League Premier Division	2	0	0	0	—		0	0	2	0
Chalfont St Peter	2007–08	Spartan South Midlands League Premier Division	1	0	—		—		3 (Note: 1 appearance in Spartan South Midlands League Premier Division Cup, 1 appearance in Berks & Bucks Senior Cup, 1 appearance in Wycombe Senior Cup)	0	4	0
Harrow Borough	2007–08	Isthmian League Premier Division	9	0	—		—		—		9	0
Harrow Borough	Total		12	0	0	0	—		0	0	12	0
Chertsey Town	2008–09	Combined Counties League Premier Division	7	0	0	0	—		0	0	7	0
Chertsey Town	Total		7	0	0	0	—		0	0	7	0
Hayes & Yeading United	2010–11	Conference Premier	9	0	0	0	—		0	0	9	0
Chester	2010–11	Northern Premier League First Division North	1	0	—		—		—		1	0
Career total			55	0	0	0	0	0	10	0	65	0
