= 2012–13 Millwall F.C. season =

Millwall
2012–13 season
- Chairman: John Berylson
- Manager: Kenny Jackett
- Football League Championship: 20th
- FA Cup: Semi-finals
- League Cup: First round
- Top goalscorer: League: Chris Wood (11); All: Chris Wood (11)
- Highest home attendance: 18,013 vs. Charlton Athletic, 1 December 2012
- Lowest home attendance: 4,050 vs. Crawley Town, 14 August 2012
- Average home league attendance: 10,559
Home colours	Away colours	Third colours

The 2012–13 Football League Championship was the 128th season in the history of Millwall Football Club. It was their 87th season as a Football League side and their 38th in the second tier of English football. This season marked Millwall's third continuous season in the Championship, after promotion from League One in 2010. This was manager Kenny Jackett's fifth and final season in charge of the club, he resigned at the end of the campaign on 7 May 2013.

Millwall reached the semi-final of the FA-Cup for only the fifth time in their history, losing to Wigan Athletic. In the league, Millwall flirted with the play-offs in the first half of the season, after a 13-game unbeaten run, but they finished poorly and narrowly avoided relegation by two points on the last day of the season.

== Matches ==
Millwall kicked off their pre-season campaign with a tour of Ireland, playing in the Republic of Ireland for two games before crossing the border to finish with a match in Northern Ireland. They returned to England for three more away games before the Football League Championship kicked off.

=== Pre-season ===
16 July 2012	Shelbourne	0 – 0	Millwall	Tolka Park
19:45		Report

18 July 2012	Longford Town	1 – 4	Millwall	Flancare Park
19:30	Raynor 54'	Report	Batt 23', 33'; O'Brien 79'; Marquis 83'

21 July 2012	Glenavon	0 – 3	Millwall	Mourneview Park
TBA

28 July 2012	Crawley Town	1 – 0	Millwall	Broadfield Stadium
15:00

4 August 2012	Exeter City	2 – 3	Millwall	St James Park
15:00	Davies, Gow		Feeney 5'; Taylor 76', 79'

7 August 2012	Southend United	1 – 2	Millwall	Roots Hall
19:45

=== Championship ===
18 August 2012 1	Millwall	0 – 2	Blackpool	The Den
15:00		Report	32', 60' Ince	Attendance: 11,010

21 August 2012 2	Peterborough United	1 – 2	Millwall	London Road Stadium
19:45	Boyd 11'	Report	43' Malone; 64' Henderson	Attendance: 6,188

25 August 2012 3	Sheffield Wednesday	3 – 2	Millwall	Hillsborough
15:00	J Johnson 19'; Llera 68', 90'	report	35' Henry; 43' Liam Trotter	Attendance: 24,752

1 September 2012 4	Millwall	3 – 1	Middlesbrough	The Den
12:45	Liam Trotter 25'; Keogh 35', 86'	Report	43' (pen.) Emnes	Attendance: 9,576

15 September 2012 5	Hull City	4 – 1	Millwall	KC Stadium
15:00	Koren 14'; Simpson 32'; Faye 36'; Aluko 40'	Report	63' Henderson	Attendance: 14,756

18 September 2012 6	Millwall	0 – 2	Cardiff City	The Den
19:45		Report	53' Whittingham; 55' Noone	Attendance: 9,295

22 September 2012 7	Millwall	1 – 2	Brighton & Hove Albion	The Den
15:00	C Taylor (yellow card) 68' (yellow-red card); Wood 79'	Report	17' Barnes; 50' El-Abd	Attendance: 12,191

29 September 2012 8	Burnley	2 – 2	Millwall	Turf Moor
15:00	Mee 19'; Austin 43'	Report	3' Trotter; 90+3' Henderson	Attendance: 11,192

2 October 2012 9	Bristol City	1 – 1	Millwall	Ashton Gate Stadium
19:45	Davies 28'	Report	38' Henderson	Attendance: 12,010

6 October 2012 10	Millwall	2 – 1	Bolton Wanderers	The Den
15:00	Henderson 17', 90'	Report	50' Eagles	Attendance: 10,116

20 October 2012 11	Crystal Palace	2 – 2	Millwall	Selhurst Park
15:00	Jedinak 35'; Delaney 39'; Moxey (yellow card) 43' (yellow-red card)	Report	42' (pen.) Trotter; 77' Beevers	Attendance: 16,124

23 October 2012 12	Millwall	3 – 3	Birmingham City	The Den
19:45	Wood 11', 18'; C Taylor 13'	Report	45+1', 49', 63' King	Attendance: 9,258

27 October 2012 13	Millwall	4 – 0	Huddersfield Town	The Den
15:00	Wood 28', 61'; Henry 79'; Trotter 88'	Report	(red card) 86' Hunt	Attendance: 11,066

3 November 2012 14	Nottingham Forest	1 – 4	Millwall	City Ground
15:00	Sharp 22'	Report	3' Trotter; 60' Henderson; 76' Wood; 84' Keogh	Attendance: 24,160

6 November 2012 15	Watford	0 – 0	Millwall	Vicarage Road
19:45		Report		Attendance: 11,293

10 November 2012 16	Millwall	2 – 1	Derby County	The Den
15:00	Feeney 33'; Keogh 76'	Report	53' Hughes	Attendance: 10,392

18 November 2012 17	Millwall	1 – 0	Leeds United	The Den
13:15	Wood 85'	Report	(red card) 48' Varney	Attendance: 13,117

24 November 2012 18	Blackburn Rovers	0 – 2	Millwall	Ewood Park
15:00		Report	Wood 71'; Henry 90'	Attendance: 13,898

27 November 2012 19	Wolverhampton Wanderers	0 – 1	Millwall	Molineux Stadium
19:45		Report	79' Keogh	Attendance: 18,174

1 December 2012 20	Millwall	0 – 0	Charlton Athletic	The Den
15:00		Report		Attendance: 18,013

8 December 2012 21	Ipswich Town	3 – 0	Millwall	Portman Road
15:00	Campbell 37', 64' (pen.); Murphy 50'	Report		Attendance: 17,830

15 December 2012 22	Millwall	1 – 0	Leicester City	The Den
15:00	C Taylor 67'	Report		Attendance: 10,189

18 December 2012 23	Brighton & Hove Albion	2 – 2	Millwall	Amex Stadium
19:45	LuaLua 61'; López 88' (pen.)	Report	25', 57' Wood	Attendance: 24,773

22 December 2012 24	Millwall	1 – 2	Barnsley	The Den
15:00	A Smith (red card) 56'; Wood 80'	Report	31' Dawson; 90+2' Tudgay	Attendance: 10,118

29 December 2012 25	Cardiff City	1 – 0	Millwall	Cardiff City Stadium
15:00	Gestede 8'	Report		Attendance: 24,263

1 January 2013 26	Millwall	2 – 1	Bristol City	The Den
15:00	N'Guessan 19'; A Smith 75'	Report	63' Stead	Attendance: 9,784

12 January 2013 27	Bolton Wanderers	1 – 1	Millwall	Reebok Stadium
15:00	Andrews 34' (pen.)	Report	9' (pen.) Keogh	Attendance: 16,985

19 January 2013 28	Millwall	0 – 2	Burnley	The Den
15:00		Report	19' Vokes; 59' Ings	Attendance: 9,384

29 January 2013 29	Barnsley	2 – 0	Millwall	Oakwell
19:45	Dagnall 56'; Scotland 67'	Report		Attendance: 7,844

2 February 2013 30	Millwall	0 – 1	Hull City	The Den
15:00		Report	1' Meyler	Attendance: 9,589

9 February 2013 31	Blackpool	2 – 1	Millwall	Bloomfield Road
15:00	Ince 61'; Delfouneso 90'	Report	32' Henry	Attendance: 12,653

19 February 2013 32	Millwall	1 – 5	Peterborough United	The Den
19:45	Henry 13'; Lowry (yellow card) 18' (yellow-red card) 69'	Report	7', 55' Tomlin; 32' Rowe; 59' Mendez-Laing; 88' Boyd	Attendance: 8,769

23 February 2013 33	Middlesbrough	1 – 2	Millwall	Riverside Stadium
15:00	Main 75'	Report	25' (o.g.) Friend; 40' Woolford	Attendance: 15,337

2 March 2013 34	Leeds United	1 – 0	Millwall	Elland Road
15:00	Warnock 72' (pen.)	Report		Attendance: 19,002

5 March 2013 35	Millwall	0 – 2	Wolverhampton Wanderers	The Den
19:45		Report	Edwards 9'; Ebanks-Blake 61'	Attendance: 8,727

16 March 2013 36	Charlton Athletic	0 – 2	Millwall	The Valley
15:00		Report	58' Easter; 64' Lowry	Attendance: 18,514

29 March 2013 37	Leicester City	0 – 1	Millwall	King Power Stadium
19:45	Morgan (red card) 3'	Report	87' Dunne	Attendance: 22,365

1 April 2013 38	Millwall	0 – 0	Ipswich Town	The Den
15:00		Report		Attendance: 10,141

6 April 2013 39	Birmingham City	1 – 1	Millwall	St Andrew's
15:00	Thomas 49'	Report	70' C Taylor	Attendance: 15,302

9 April 2013 40	Millwall	1 – 2	Sheffield Wednesday	The Den
19:45	Abdou 2'	Report	40' Llera; 90' Maguire	Attendance: 9,084

16 April 2013 41	Millwall	1 – 0	Watford	The Den
19:45	Batt 83'	Report		Attendance: 9,366

20 April 2013 42	Huddersfield Town	3 – 0	Millwall	John Smith's Stadium
15:00	Beckford 37', 62'; Vaughan 55'	Report		Attendance: 12,415

23 April 2013 43	Millwall	1 – 2	Blackburn Rovers	The Den
19:45	Osbourne 14'	Report	56' Jones; 78' (pen.) Rhodes	Attendance: 8,607

27 April 2013 44	Millwall	0 – 1	Nottingham Forest	The Den
15:00		Report	8' Halford	Attendance: 12,330

30 April 2013 45	Millwall	0 – 0	Crystal Palace	The Den
19:45		Report		Attendance: 12,745

4 May 2013 46	Derby County	1 – 0	Millwall	Pride Park Stadium
12:45	Sammon 85'	Report		Attendance: 25,021

=== FA Cup ===
5 January 2013 Round 3	Millwall	1 – 0	Preston North End	The Den
15:00	Feeney 31'	Report		Attendance: 5,364

25 January 2013 Round 4	Millwall	2 – 1	Aston Villa	The Den
19:45	Shittu 27'; Marquis 89'	Report	22' Bent	Attendance: 15,007

16 February 2013 Round 5	Luton Town	0 – 3	Millwall	Kenilworth Road
12:45			Henry 12'; Hulse 36'; N'Guessan 86'

10 March 2013 Quarter-Final	Millwall	0 – 0	Blackburn Rovers	The Den
13:00				Attendance: 14,885

13 March 2013 Quarter-Final Replay	Blackburn Rovers	0 – 1	Millwall	Ewood Park
19:30			Shittu 42'

13 April 2013 Semi-Final	Millwall	0 – 2	Wigan Athletic	Wembley Stadium
15:00		Report	25' Maloney; 78' McManaman	Attendance: 62,335

=== League Cup ===
14 August 2012 First round	Millwall	2 – 2 (a.e.t.) (1 – 4 p)	Crawley Town	The Den
19:45	Ward 23'; Batt 85'	Report	16' Hope Akpan; 56' Adams	Attendance: 4,050
	Penalties
	Henderson (penalty missed); Smith (penalty missed); Trotter (penalty scored)		(penalty scored) Alexander; (penalty scored) Bulman; (penalty scored) McFadzean; (penalty scored) Hunt

==== League table ====
Pos	Team	Pld	W	D	L	GF	GA	GD	Pts	Promotion or relegation
18	Sheffield Wednesday	46	16	10	20	53	61	−8	58	
19	Huddersfield Town	46	15	13	18	53	73	−20	58	
20	Millwall	46	15	11	20	51	62	−11	56	
21	Barnsley	46	14	13	19	56	70	−14	55	
22	Peterborough United (R)	46	15	9	22	66	75	−9	54	Relegation to Football League One

Updated to match(es) played on 4 May 2013. Source: BBC Sport
Rules for classification: 1) points; 2) goal difference; 3) number of goals scored.
(R) Relegated

==== Results summary ====
Overall								Home						Away					
Pld	W	D	L	GF	GA	GD	Pts	W	D	L	GF	GA	GD	W	D	L	GF	GA	GD
38	14	10	14	48	49	−1	52	7	3	8	21	24	−3	7	7	6	27	25	+2

Last updated: 7 April 2013.

==== Result round by round ====
Round	1	2	3	4	5	6	7	8	9	10	11	12	13	14	15	16	17	18	19	20	21	22	23	24	25	26	27	28	29	30	31	32	33	34	35	36	37	38	39	40	41	42	43	44	45	46
Ground	H	A	A	H	A	H	H	A	A	H	A	H	H	A	A	H	H	A	A	H	A	H	A	H	A	H	A	H	A	H	A	H	H	A	A	A	A	A	A	H	A	H	H	A	H	A
Result	L	W	L	W	L	L	L	D	D	W	D	D	W	W	D	W	W	W	W	D	L	W	D	L	L	W	D	L	L	L	L	L	W	L	L	W	W	D	D	L	W	L	L	L	D	L
Position	23	17	19	7	16	21	22	22	22	20	19	19	15	14	14	10	9	6	5	7	7	6	6	7	8	7	7	9	9	10	12	14	13	14	17	14	14	14	15	15	16	18	18	19	19	20

Updated to match(es) played on 4 May 2013. Source:
A = Away; H = Home; W = Win; D = Draw; L = Loss

== Squad statistics ==
=== Appearances and goals ===
As of 5 May 2013

No.	Pos	Nat	Player	Total		Championship		FA Cup		League Cup	
No.	Pos	Nat	Player	Apps	Goals	Apps	Goals	Apps	Goals	Apps	Goals
1	GK	(Republic of Ireland) IRL	David Forde	45	0	40	0	5	0	0	0
2	DF	(Republic of Ireland) IRL	Alan Dunne	27	1	22+2	1	3	0	0	0
3	DF	(Nigeria) NGR	Danny Shittu	43	1	38+1	0	3	1	0+1	0
4	MF	(England) ENG	Josh Wright	26	0	19+5	0	1	0	0+1	0
5	DF	(England) ENG	Paul Robinson	4	0	2+1	0	0	0	1	0
6	MF	(England) ENG	Liam Trotter	40	6	34+1	6	3+1	0	1	0
7	FW	(England) ENG	Rob Hulse (on loan from Queens Park Rangers)	14	1	7+4	0	2+1	1	0	0
8	MF	(Guadeloupe) GLP	Therry Racon	1	0	0+1	0	0	0	0	0
9	FW	(England) ENG	John Marquis	12	1	6+4	0	1+1	1	0	0
10	FW	(England) ENG	Nathan Tyson (on loan from Derby County)	4	0	1+3	0	0	0	0	0
11	FW	(England) ENG	Shaun Batt	18	2	4+11	1	0+2	0	0+1	1
12	DF	(Australia) AUS	Shane Lowry	44	1	37+2	1	4	0	1	0
14	MF	(England) ENG	James Henry	40	6	33+2	5	4	1	1	0
15	MF	(England) ENG	Liam Feeney	26	2	12+10	1	3	1	1	0
16	DF	(England) ENG	Mark Beevers	39	1	34	1	5	0	0	0
17	MF	(England) ENG	Tamika Mkandawire	0	0	0	0	0	0	0	0
18	MF	(England) ENG	Martyn Woolford	15	1	8+7	1	0	0	0	0
19	MF	(England) ENG	Chris Taylor	25	3	17+5	3	2	0	1	0
20	FW	(Republic of Ireland) IRL	Andy Keogh	40	6	24+12	6	4	0	0	0
21	DF	(England) ENG	Jack Smith	22	0	13+4	0	2+2	0	1	0
22	MF	(France) FRA	Dany N'Guessan	17	2	6+7	1	2+2	1	0	0
23	GK	(England) ENG	Steve Mildenhall	0	0	0	0	0	0	0	0
24	MF	(England) ENG	Jake Goodman	0	0	0	0	0	0	0	0
25	DF	(England) ENG	Adam Smith (on loan from Tottenham Hotspur)	28	1	24+1	1	2+1	0	0	0
26	MF	(Comoros) COM	Nadjim Abdou	44	1	36+3	1	4	0	1	0
27	DF	(England) ENG	Karleigh Osborne	14	1	13	1	1	0	0	0
28	MF	(England) ENG	Scott Malone	16	1	13+2	1	0	0	1	0
29	MF	(England) ENG	George Saville (on loan from Chelsea)	3	0	2+1	0	0	0	0	0
30	FW	(Republic of Ireland) IRL	Aiden O'Brien	0	0	0	0	0	0	0	0
31	FW	(Wales) WAL	Jermaine Easter (on loan from Crystal Palace)	9	1	5+4	1	0	0	0	0
32	MF	(England) ENG	Richard Chaplow (on loan from Southampton)	4	0	4	0	0	0	0	0
33	GK	(Northern Ireland) NIR	Maik Taylor	7	0	6	0	0	0	1	0
39	DF	(Republic of Ireland) IRL	Sean St Ledger (on loan from Leicester City)	7	0	5+1	0	1	0	0	0
Players who featured for club, who have left:
7	FW	(England) ENG	Darius Henderson	21	7	16+3	7	1	0	1	0
13	FW	(England) ENG	Benik Afobe (on loan from Arsenal)	5	0	5	0	0	0	0	0
18	DF	(England) ENG	Darren Ward	2	1	1	0	0	0	1	1
39	FW	(New Zealand) NZL	Chris Wood (on loan from West Bromwich Albion)	19	11	18+1	11	0	0	0	0

=== Top scorers ===
Place	Position	Nationality	Number	Name	Championship	FA Cup	League Cup	Total
1	FW	(New Zealand)	~~39~~	Chris Wood	11	0	0	11
2	FW	(England)	7	Darius Henderson	7	0	0	7
3	MF	(England)	6	Liam Trotter	6	0	0	6
3	MF	(England)	14	James Henry	5	1	0	6
3	FW	(Republic of Ireland)	20	Andy Keogh	6	0	0	6
4	MF	(England)	19	Chris Taylor	3	0	0	3
4	DF	(England)	27	Karleigh Osbourne	1	0	0	1
5	DF	(Nigeria)	3	Danny Shittu	0	2	0	2
5	MF	(England)	11	Shaun Batt	1	0	1	2
5	MF	(England)	15	Liam Feeney	1	1	0	2
5	FW	(France)	22	Dany N'Guessan	1	1	0	2
10	DF	(England)	2	Alan Dunne	1	0	0	1
10	FW	(England)	7	Rob Hulse	0	1	0	1
10	FW	(England)	9	John Marquis	0	1	0	1
10	DF	(Australia)	12	Shane Lowry	1	0	0	1
10	DF	(England)	16	Mark Beevers	1	0	0	1
10	DF	(England)	18	Darren Ward	0	0	1	1
10	MF	(England)	18	Martyn Woolford	1	0	0	1
10	MF	(England)	28	Scott Malone	1	0	0	1
10	DF	(England)	25	Adam Smith	1	0	0	1
10	MF	(Comoros)	26	Nadjim Abdou	1	0	0	1
10	FW	(Wales)	31	Jermaine Easter	1	0	0	1
10	Own Goals				1	0	0	1
				49	7	2	59	

=== Disciplinary record ===
Number	Nationality	Position	Name	Championship		FA Cup		League Cup		Total	
Number	Nationality	Position	Name	Yellow card	Red card	Yellow card	Red card	Yellow card	Red card	Yellow card	Red card
1	(Republic of Ireland)	GK	David Forde	4	0	1	0	0	0	5	0
2	(England)	DF	Alan Dunne	11	0	0	0	0	0	11	0
3	(Nigeria)	DF	Danny Shittu	4	0	0	0	0	0	4	0
4	(England)	MF	Josh Wright	2	0	0	0	0	0	2	0
5	(England)	DF	Paul Robinson	1	0	0	0	0	0	1	0
6	(England)	MF	Liam Trotter	5	0	0	0	0	0	5	0
7	(England)	FW	Rob Hulse	2	0	0	0	0	0	2	0
9	(England)	FW	John Marquis	3	0	0	0	0	0	3	0
11	(England)	MF	Shaun Batt	2	0	0	0	1	0	3	0
12	(Australia)	DF	Shane Lowry	13	1	2	0	0	0	15	1
14	(England)	MF	James Henry	8	0	0	0	0	0	8	0
15	(England)	MF	Liam Feeney	1	0	0	0	0	0	1	0
16	(England)	DF	Mark Beevers	7	0	2	0	0	0	9	0
18	(England)	MF	Martyn Woolford	2	0	0	0	0	0	2	0
19	(England)	MF	Chris Taylor	4	1	0	0	0	0	4	1'
20	(Republic of Ireland)	FW	Andy Keogh	3	0	2	0	0	0	5	0
21	(England)	DF	Jack Smith	1	0	0	0	0	0	1	0
25	(England)	DF	Adam Smith	4	1	1	0	0	0	5	1
26	(Comoros)	MF	Nadjim Abdou	6	0	0	0	1	0	7	0
27	(England)	DF	Karleigh Osborne	3	0	0	0	0	0	3	0
29	(England)	MF	George Saville	1	0	0	0	0	0	1	0
31	(Wales)	FW	Jermaine Easter	2	0	0	0	0	0	2	0
32	(England)	MF	Richard Chaplow	2	0	0	0	0	0	2	0
39	(Republic of Ireland)	DF	Sean St Ledger	0	0	1	0	0	0	1	0
39	(New Zealand)	FW	Chris Wood	1	0	0	0	0	0	1	0
			TOTALS	91	3	9	0	2	0	102	3

== Squad ==
=== Detailed overview ===
No.	Name	Nat.	Place of birth	Date of birth	Club apps.	Club goals	Int. caps	Int. goals	Previous club	Date joined	Fee
1	David Forde	(Republic of Ireland)	Galway	20 December 1979	192	0	2	0	Cardiff City	5 June 2008	Free
2	Alan Dunne	(Republic of Ireland)	Dublin	23 August 1982	287	20	-	-	N/A	1 June 2000	Trainee
4	Josh Wright	(England)	Tower Hamlets	6 November 1989	21	1	-	-	Free Agent	15 November 2011	Free
5	Paul Robinson	(England)	London	7 January 1982	331	23	-	-	N/A	1 August 2001	Trainee
6	Liam Trotter	(England)	Ipswich	24 August 1988	100	15	-	-	Ipswich Town	24 June 2010	Free
7	Rob Hulse	(England)	Crewe	25 October 1979	-	-	-	-	Queens Park Rangers	29 January 2013	Loan
8	Therry Racon	(Guadeloupe)	Villeneuve-Saint-Georges (France)	1 May 1984	1	0	3	0	Charlton Athletic	1 July 2011	Free
9	John Marquis	(England)	London	16 May 1992	34	5	-	-	N/A	1 August 2009	Trainee
10	Nathan Tyson	(England)	Reading	4 May 1982	-	-	-	-	Derby County	17 January 2013	Loan
11	Shaun Batt	(England)	Luton	22 February 1987	23	3	-	-	Peterborough United	16 June 2010	Undisclosed
12	Shane Lowry	(Australia)	Perth	12 June 1989	23	1	-	-	Aston Villa	27 January 2012	Undisclosed
14	James Henry	(England)	Reading	10 June 1989	118	13	-	-	Reading	28 July 2010	Undisclosed
16	Mark Beevers	(England)	Barnsley	21 November 1989	-	-	-	-	Sheffield Wednesday	1 January 2013	Undisclosed
17	Tamika Mkandawire	(England)	Mzuzu (Malawi)	28 May 1983	53	2	-	-	Leyton Orient	16 June 2010	Free
18	Martyn Woolford	(England)	Castleford	13 October 1985	-	-	-	-	Bristol City	9 January 2013	Undisclosed
19	Chris Taylor	(England)	Oldham	20 December 1986	-	-	-	-	Oldham Athletic	15 June 2012	Free
20	Andy Keogh	(Republic of Ireland)	Dublin	16 May 1986	19	10	22	1	Wolverhampton Wanderers	31 January 2012	Undisclosed
21	Jack Smith	(England)	Hemel Hempstead	14 October 1983	91	2	-	-	Swindon Town	2 August 2009	Undisclosed
22	Dany N'Guessan	(France)	Ivry-sur-Seine	11 August 1987	19	3	-	-	Leicester City	31 August 2011	Free
23	Steve Mildenhall	(England)	Swindon	13 May 1978	15	0	-	-	Southend United	13 July 2010	Free
25	Adam Smith	(England)	London	29 April 1991	-	-	-	-	Tottenham Hotspur	1 November 2012	Loan
26	Nadjim Abdou	(Comoros)	Martigues (France)	13 July 1984	177	5	1	0	Plymouth Argyle	3 July 2008	Free
27	Karleigh Osborne	(England)	Southall	19 March 1988	-	-	-	-	Brentford	13 July 2012	Free
28	Scott Malone	(England)	Rowley Regis	25 March 1991	-	-	-	-	Bournemouth	30 May 2012	£750,000
29	George Saville	(England)	Camberley	1 June 1994	-	-	-	-	Chelsea	28 February 2013	Loan
31	Jermaine Easter	(Wales)	Cardiff	15 January 1982	-	-	-	-	Crystal Palace	15 March 2013	Loan
32	Richard Chaplow	(England)	Accrington	2 February 1985	-	-	-	-	Southampton	15 March 2013	Loan
33	Maik Taylor	(Northern Ireland)	Hildesheim (West Germany)	4 September 1971	10	0	88	0	Leeds United	2 May 2012	Free
39	Sean St Ledger	(Republic of Ireland)	Solihull (England)	28 December 1984	-	-	33	3	Leicester City	28 March 2013	Loan
	Thomas Bender	(Wales)	Harlow (England)	19 January 1993	-	-	-	-	Free Agent	27 March 2013	Free

=== International Call-ups ===
Match Date	No.	P	Name	Country	Level	Matches	Caps	Goals
15 August	1	GK	David Forde	Ireland	Senior	vs. Serbia		
15 August	20	FW	Andy Keogh	Ireland	Senior	vs. Serbia		

== Transfers ==
=== In ===
No.	Pos.	Nat.	Name	Age	EU	Moving from	Type	Transfer window	Ends	Transfer fee	Source
33	GK	(Northern Ireland) (West Germany)	Maik Taylor	40	EU	Leeds United	Free Transfer	Summer	2013	Free	Yorkshire Evening Post
28	MF	(England)	Scott Malone	21	EU	Bournemouth	Cash plus Player deal	Summer	2015	£750,000	BBC Sport
19	MF	(England)	Chris Taylor	25	EU	Oldham Athletic	Free Transfer	Summer	2015	Free	Official Site
27	DF	(England)	Karleigh Osborne	24	EU	Brentford	Free Transfer	Summer	2014	Free	Sky Sports
16	DF	(England)	Mark Beevers	23	EU	Sheffield Wednesday	Transfer	Winter	2016	Undisclosed	BBC Sport
18	MF	(England)	Martyn Woolford	27	EU	Bristol City	Transfer	Winter	2015	Undisclosed	BBC Sport
	DF	(Wales) (England)	Thomas Bender	20	EU	Free agent	Free Transfer		2014	Free	BBC Sport

=== Loans in ===
No.	Pos.	Name	Country	Age	Loan club	Started	Ended	Start source	End source
39	FW	Chris Wood	(New Zealand)	21	West Bromwich Albion	17 September	28 December	BBC Sport	BBC Sport
16	DF	Mark Beevers	(England)	23	Sheffield Wednesday	5 October	1 January	BBC Sport	BBC Sport
25	DF	A Smith	(England)	35	Tottenham Hotspur	1 November		Tottenham Hotspur FC	
10	FW	Nathan Tyson	(England)	44	Derby County	17 January		Sky Sports	
7	FW	Rob Hulse	(England)	47	Queens Park Rangers	29 January	31 May	BBC Sport	
13	FW	Benik Afobe	(England)	20	Arsenal	8 February	7 March	BBC Sport	BBC Sport
29	MF	George Saville	(England)	19	Chelsea	28 February	4 May	BBC Sport	
32	MF	Richard Chaplow	(England)	28	Southampton	15 March	31 May	BBC Sport	
31	FW	Jermaine Easter	(Wales)	31	Crystal Palace	15 March	31 May	BBC Sport	
39	DF	Sean St Ledger	(Republic of Ireland) (England)	28	Leicester City	28 March	7 May	BBC Sport	BBC Sport

Sources: For loan start source see "Start source". For loan end source see "End source".
EU = if holds or not a European Union passport; Country: when 2 flags, 1st flag = country that plays for internationally, 2nd flag = country of birth; No. = number on jersey; P = Position (for position name, pause mouse pointer on abbreviation); Name = Name on jersey (for more extensive name, pause mouse pointer on name); In/Out = In: The player came in on loan, Out: The player went out on loan; Loan club = the club that the player moved on loan to or the club that the player came from on loan; Started = the date when the player's loan started; Ended = the date when the player's loan ended.

=== Out ===
No.	Pos.	Name	Country	Age	Type	Moving to	Transfer window	Transfer fee	Apps	Goals	Source
12	DF	Chris Hackett	(England)	29	Out of Contract	Northampton Town	Summer	Free	145	6	Official Site
29	DF	Jordan Stewart	(England)	30	Out of Contract		Summer	Free	7	0	Official Site
10	FW	Josh McQuoid	(Northern Ireland) (England)	22	Cash plus Player deal	Bournemouth	Summer	Free	19	1	BBC Sport
8	MF	Hamer Bouazza	(Algeria) (France)	27	Free Transfer	Omonia Nicosia (Cyprus)	Summer	Free	44	4	News at Den
3	DF	Tony Craig	(England)	27	Transfer	Brentford	Summer	Undisclosed	233	7	Brentford F.C.
16	DF	Scott Barron	(England)	26	Transfer	Brentford	Summer	Undisclosed	132	3	Brentford F.C.
18	DF	Ward	(England)	34	Transfer	Swindon Town	Winter	Free	270	7	BBC Sport
7	FW	Darius Henderson	(England)	31	Transfer	Nottingham Forest	Winter	Undisclosed	53	26	BBC Sport

EU = if holds or not a European Union passport; Country: when 2 flags, 1st flag = country that plays for internationally, 2nd flag = country of birth; N = number on jersey; P = Position (for position name, pause mouse pointer on abbreviation); Name = Name on jersey (for more extensive name, pause mouse pointer on name); Age = age on the day of the signing; Moving from = only indicate the club the player was playing before start playing for this club in this season, for the type of the moving see Status column; Moving to = only indicates the club the player is going to play next, for the type of the moving see Status column; Ends = when the player's current contract ends; n/a = Not applicable; Apps = Total number of competitive appearances (including substitute appearances) at the club prior to departure; Goals = Total number of competitive goals scored at the club prior to departure.

=== Loans Out ===
No.	Pos.	Name	Country	Age	Loan club	Started	Ended	Start source	End source
18	DF	Darren Ward	(England)	34	Swindon Town	30 August	4 January	BBC Sport	BBC Sport
17	MF	Tamika Mkandawire	(England)	43	Southend United	2 November		BBC Sport	
23	GK	Steve Mildenhall	(England)	33	Scunthorpe United	5 November	31 December	BBC Sport	BBC Sport
23	GK	Steve Mildenhall	(England)	47	Bristol Rovers	1 January		BBC Sport	

Sources: For loan start source see "Start source". For loan end source see "End source".
EU = if holds or not a European Union passport; Country: when 2 flags, 1st flag = country that plays for internationally, 2nd flag = country of birth; No. = number on jersey; P = Position (for position name, pause mouse pointer on abbreviation); Name = Name on jersey (for more extensive name, pause mouse pointer on name); In/Out = In: The player came in on loan, Out: The player went out on loan; Loan club = the club that the player moved on loan to or the club that the player came from on loan; Started = the date when the player's loan started; Ended = the date when the player's loan ended.

=== Contracts ===
No.	Pos.	Nat.	Name	Age	Status	Contract length	Expiry date	Source
44	MF	(England)	Josh Wright	22	Signed	3 years	June 2015	Official Site
21	DF	(England)	Jack Smith	28	Signed	2 years	June 2014	BBC Sport
14	MF	(England)	James Henry	23	Signed	1 year	June 2014	Official Site
5	DF	(England)	Robinson	30	Signed	3 years	June 2015	Sky Sports
26	MF	(Comoros)	Nadjim Abdou	28	Signed	2 years	June 2015	
