= Jamie Palmer =

English footballer

Personal information
- Full name: James Brian Palmer
- Date of birth: 25 November 1985 (age 40)
- Place of birth: Ashford, England
- Position: Right back

Youth career
- 1996–2004: Brentford

Senior career*
Years	Team	Apps	(Gls)
2004–2005	Brentford	0	(0)
2004–2005	→ Kingstonian (loan)	6	(1)
2005	→ Staines Town (loan)	2	(0)
2005	Staines Town	2	(0)
2005	→ Northwood (dual-reg)	1	(0)
2005–2006	Wealdstone	14	(0)
2006	North Greenford United	1	(0)
2006	Wealdstone	0	(0)
- * Club domestic league appearances and goals

James Brian Palmer (born 25 November 1985) is an English footballer who plays as a right back. He began his career at Brentford, for whom he made one professional appearance before dropping into non-League football upon his release in 2005. Palmer moved into Sunday League football in 2007 and served as player-manager of Bell on the Green Casuals. He has sometimes been known as Brian Palmer.

== Career ==
=== Brentford ===
Palmer began his career as a youth at Brentford and entered the club's Centre of Excellence at age 10. He progressed through the youth system to begin a scholarship in 2002. Palmer maiden call into the first team squad came on 24 August 2004, for a League Cup first round match versus Ipswich Town and he remained an unused substitute during the 2–0 defeat. Palmer received his second call into the first team squad for a Football League Trophy first round match against Milton Keynes Dons on 28 September 2004. Picked in a squad composed mostly of scholars, Palmer made his professional debut in the match and played the full 90 minutes of the 3–0 defeat. Palmer was an unused substitute on three further occasions during the 2004–05 season. Palmer joined Isthmian League Premier Division club Kingstonian on a work experience loan in December 2004. He remained at Kingsmeadow until March 2005 and made one appearance and scored one goal for the club. The goal would be the only senior strike of his career and it came in a 2–2 draw with Harrow Borough on 29 January 2005. Palmer was released at the end of the 2004–05 season.

=== Non-League football ===
Towards the end of the 2004–05 season, Palmer joined Isthmian League Premier Division club Staines Town on loan until the end of the campaign. He made two appearances for the club and his loan was made permanent during the 2005 off-season. He managed only two appearances during the 2005–06 season and spent a period with Southern League Premier Division club Northwood, whom he joined on a dual-registration basis. Palmer transferred to Isthmian League Premier Division club Wealdstone in December 2005 and made 16 appearances during the remainder of the 2005–06 season.

Palmer made an appearance for Combined Counties League Premier Division club North Greenford United on 11 April 2006, in a 3–0 defeat to Chessington & Hook United. He Palmer made a substitute appearance for Wealdstone in a Brian Collins Challenge Trophy shootout win over Harrow Borough on 6 August 2006.

=== Sunday league football ===
Palmer moved into Sunday League football in 2007 and joined Hayes Middlesex Sunday League Sixth Division club AFC Stanwell Athletic. He was appointed player-manager in the latter stages of the 2007–08 season. The club folded during the 2008 off-season, which led Palmer to approach The Bell on the Green pub in Bedfont, which agreed to provide funding for the club, on the condition that the new club was named Bell on the Green Sunday. Over the following decade, Palmer player-managed the club to promotions in the 2009–10, 2010–11 and 2013–14 seasons and victory in the Arthur White Memorial Shield in 2011. As of November 2016, Palmer was still player-manager of the club's Casuals team. He also had a spell as player-manager of Middlesex County League Third Division club AFC Bedfont during the 2014–15 season.

== Career statistics ==
Appearances and goals by club, season and competition
Club	Season	League			FA Cup		League Cup		Other		Total	
Club	Season	Division	Apps	Goals	Apps	Goals	Apps	Goals	Apps	Goals	Apps	Goals
Brentford	2004–05	League One	0	0	0	0	0	0	1 (Note: Appearance in Football League Trophy)	0	1	0
Kingstonian (loan)	2004–05	Isthmian League Premier Division	6	1	—		—		2 (Note: 1 appearance in Isthmian League Cup, 1 appearance in Surrey Senior Cup)	0	8	1
Staines Town (loan)	2004–05	Isthmian League Premier Division	2	0	—		—		—		2	0
Staines Town	2005–06	Isthmian League Premier Division	2	0	0	0	—		0	0	2	0
Staines Town	Total		4	0	0	0	—		0	0	4	0
Northwood (dual-registration)	2005–06	Southern League Premier Division	1	0	2	0	—		—		3	0
Wealdstone	2005–06	Isthmian League Premier Division	14	0	—		—		2 (Note: Appearances in Isthmian League Cup)	0	16	0
North Greenford United	2005–06	Combined Counties League Premier Division	1	0	—		—		—		1	0
Career total			26	1	2	0	0	0	6	0	34	1

== Honours ==
=== As a player ===
Wealdstone

- Brian Collins Challenge Trophy: 2006

Bell On The Green Casuals

- Chiswick & District Sunday League First Division second-place promotion: 2009–10, 2013–14
- Chiswick & District Sunday League Second Division third-place promotion: 2008–09
- Arthur White Memorial Shield: 2010–11

=== As a manager ===
Bell On The Green Casuals

- Chiswick & District Sunday League First Division second-place promotion: 2009–10, 2013–14
- Chiswick & District Sunday League Second Division third-place promotion: 2008–09
- Arthur White Memorial Shield: 2010–11
