= 2004–05 Brentford F.C. season =

English football team season

Brentford
2004–05 season
- Chairman: Eddie Rogers
- Manager: Martin Allen
- Stadium: Griffin Park
- League One: 4th
- Play-offs: Semi-finals
- FA Cup: Fifth round
- League Cup: First round
- Football League Trophy: First round
- Top goalscorer: League: Burton (10); All: Burton, Rankin (10)
- Highest home attendance: 9,604
- Lowest home attendance: 4,430
- Average home league attendance: 6,082
Home colours	Away colours	Third colours

During the 2004–05 English football season, Brentford competed in Football League One. In his first full season as manager of the club, Martin Allen's "two bob team" reached the 2005 Football League play-off semi-finals and the fifth round of the FA Cup.

== Season summary ==
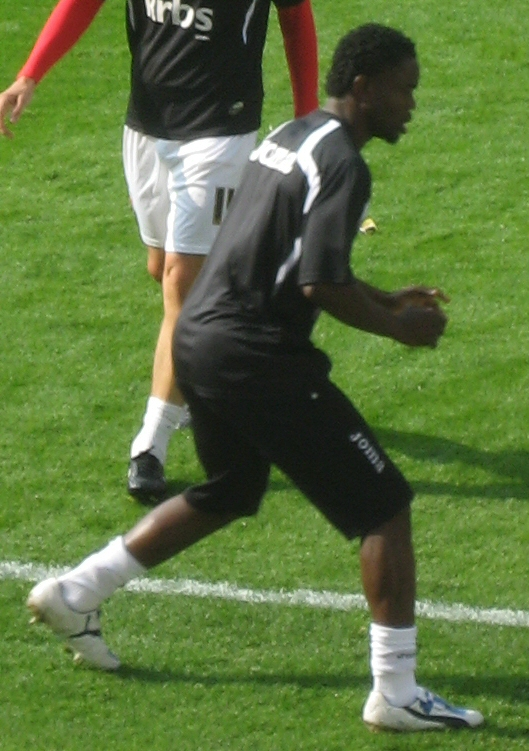
Centre back Sam Sodje's performances won him the Brentford Supporters' Player of the Year award.

After pulling off "The Great Escape" from relegation at the end of the 2003–04 season, Brentford manager Martin Allen signed a three-year contract and assembled a "two bob" squad of veterans, youngsters and non-League footballers on free transfers. The club was £7 million in debt and facing annual interest payments on its overdraft of £300,000. The season was punctuated by bizarre motivational challenges set by Allen, which stretched from ordering the players to prepare their own lunch to swimming in rivers before cup ties.

As the season got underway, Brentford suffered first round exits from the League Cup and the Football League Trophy, but a run of five wins in eight league matches through to mid-October 2004 saw the club rooted in the League One automatic promotion places. Though Brentford then won just four matches in all competitions during the final two months of 2004, the club managed to remain in the top 10 in League One. Victory over Walsall in the first match at Griffin Park of 2005 began a spell in which the Bees lost just three of the following 21 matches in all competitions. One of the defeats came in a FA Cup fifth round replay at home to Southampton, which ended a memorable run that earned the club over £500,000 in match revenues. Postponements due to the cup run gave Brentford up to three games in hand from February through March.

Brentford broke back into the playoff positions on 12 April, after a 1–0 win over Tranmere Rovers, still with a game in hand. Consecutive defeats to Bradford City, Huddersfield Town and Luton Town in April dropped the Bees outside the playoff places, but a late 2–1 comeback victory away to Wrexham in the penultimate match of the regular season (the final game in hand) confirmed a place in the playoffs. Martin Allen selected a predominantly youth and reserve lineup for the final match of the league season versus already-promoted Hull City. The experimental team secured a 2–1 victory and a 4th-place finish in League One. Despite finishing 4th, the 9 goals conceded during the three defeats in April saw Brentford finish the season with a goal difference of −3.

Brentford met 5th-place Sheffield Wednesday in the 2005 League One playoffs, but a 1–0 defeat in the first leg at Hillsborough left the Bees with a mountain to climb. Despite an improved performance in the second leg at Griffin Park, the team crumbled and conceded twice to effectively end the tie, before Andy Frampton grabbed a late consolation.

== League table ==
Pos	Team	Pld	W	D	L	GF	GA	GD	Pts	Promotion or relegation
2	Hull City (P)	46	26	8	12	80	53	+27	86	Promotion to Football League Championship
3	Tranmere Rovers	46	22	13	11	73	55	+18	79	Qualification for League One play-offs
4	Brentford	46	22	9	15	57	60	−3	75	Qualification for League One play-offs
5	Sheffield Wednesday (O, P)	46	19	15	12	77	59	+18	72	Qualification for League One play-offs
6	Hartlepool United	46	21	8	17	76	66	+10	71	Qualification for League One play-offs

Updated to match(es) played on May 2005. Source:
Rules for classification: 1) points; 2) goal difference; 3) number of goals scored.
(O) Play-off winners; (P) Promoted

== Results ==
Brentford's goal tally listed first.

=== Legend ===
Win	Draw	Loss

=== Pre-season ===
Date	Opponent	Venue	Result	Attendance	Scorer(s)
17 July 2004	Hampton & Richmond Borough	A	3–0	n/a	Burton, Hutchinson, Salako
20 July 2004	AFC Wimbledon	H	2–0	2,562	Burton, Peters
25 July 2004	Reading	H	1–0	3,230	Rankin
28 July 2004	Aldershot Town	A	3–2	1,400	Burton (2), Hargreaves
31 July 2004	Newmarket Town	A	5–0	n/a	Muldowney, Rhodes (3, 1 pen), Peters
2 August 2004	Arundel	A	3–0	471	Smith, Sodje, Moleski

=== Football League One ===
No.	Date	Opponent	Venue	Result	Attendance	Scorer(s)
1	7 August 2004	Chesterfield	A	1–3	4,651	Rhodes
2	10 August 2004	Doncaster Rovers	H	4–3	5,621	Rankin, Hargreaves, Burton, Tabb
3	14 August 2004	Wrexham	H	1–0	5,091	O'Connor
4	21 August 2004	Peterborough United	A	0–3	4,868	
5	28 August 2004	Stockport County	H	3–0	4,643	Dobson, Salako, Burton
6	30 August 2004	Bristol City	A	1–4	10,296	O'Connor
7	4 September 2004	Bournemouth	H	2–1	5,682	Talbot, Rankin
8	11 September 2004	Torquay United	A	2–2	3,458	Hargreaves, Sodje
9	18 September 2004	Port Vale	H	1–0	5,442	Salako (pen)
10	25 September 2004	Walsall	A	0–1	5,302	
11	2 October 2004	Oldham Athletic	H	2–0	5,818	Rankin, Burton
12	9 October 2004	Barnsley	A	0–0	8,453	
13	16 October 2004	Milton Keynes Dons	A	0–0	5,924	
14	19 October 2004	Hartlepool United	H	2–1	4,797	Rankin, Burton
15	23 October 2004	Blackpool	H	0–3	6,722	
16	30 October 2004	Tranmere Rovers	A	0–1	8,740	
17	7 November 2004	Huddersfield Town	A	1–1	10,810	Sodje
18	20 November 2004	Bradford City	H	1–2	5,909	Rhodes
19	27 November 2004	Hull City	A	0–2	15,710	
20	7 December 2004	Luton Town	H	2–0	6,393	Burton, May
21	11 December 2004	Sheffield Wednesday	A	2–1	21,592	Rhodes, Burton
22	18 December 2004	Colchester United	H	1–0	5,634	Salako
23	26 December 2004	Torquay United	H	1–3	6,419	Sodje
24	28 December 2004	Swindon Town	A	0–3	6,875	
25	1 January 2005	Bournemouth	A	2–3	8,072	Rankin (2)
26	3 January 2005	Walsall	H	1–0	5,084	Broad (og)
27	15 January 2005	Port Vale	A	1–0	4,230	Hutchinson
28	22 January 2005	Swindon Town	H	2–1	5,867	Burton, Hunt
29	25 January 2005	Barnsley	H	1–1	4,835	Sodje
30	5 February 2005	Milton Keynes Dons	H	1–0	5,077	Hunt (pen)
31	22 February 2005	Hartlepool United	A	1–3	4,206	Rankin
32	26 February 2005	Sheffield Wednesday	H	3–3	8,323	Burton, Peters, Hunt
33	5 March 2005	Colchester United	A	1–0	3,066	Tabb
34	12 March 2005	Doncaster Rovers	A	0–0	5,525	
35	15 March 2005	Oldham Athletic	A	2–0	4,291	S.P. Fitzgerald
36	19 March 2005	Chesterfield	H	2–2	6,097	Burton, Tabb
37	22 March 2005	Blackpool	A	1–2	5,478	Pratley
38	28 March 2005	Peterborough United	H	0–0	6,341	
39	2 April 2005	Stockport County	A	2–1	4,408	S.P. Fitzgerald, Sodje
40	9 April 2005	Bristol City	H	1–0	6,780	Sodje
41	12 April 2005	Tranmere Rovers	H	1–0	6,005	Turner
42	16 April 2005	Bradford City	A	1–4	6,743	Tabb
43	23 April 2005	Huddersfield Town	H	0–1	7,703	Owusu
44	30 April 2005	Luton Town	A	2–4	9,313	Sodje, Burton
45	3 May 2005	Wrexham	A	2–1	4,374	Rankin, S.P. Fitzgerald
46	7 May 2005	Hull City	H	2–1	9,604	Sobers, Tabb

=== Football League play-offs ===
Round	Date	Opponent	Venue	Result	Attendance	Scorer(s)
SF (1st leg)	12 May 2005	Sheffield Wednesday	A	0–1	28,625	
SF (2nd leg)	16 May 2005	Sheffield Wednesday	H	1–2 (lost 3–1 on aggregate)	10,823	Frampton

=== FA Cup ===
Round	Date	Opponent	Venue	Result	Attendance	Scorer(s)
R1	12 November 2004	Bristol City	A	1–1	7,547	Salako
R1 (replay)	25 November 2004	Bristol City	H	1–1 (a.e.t.), won 4–3 on pens)	3,706	Frampton
R2	5 December 2004	Hinckley United	A	0–0	2,661	
R2 (replay)	14 December 2004	Hinckley United	H	2–1	4,002	Rhodes, Talbot
R3	8 January 2005	Luton Town	A	2–0	6,861	Hargreaves, Tabb
R4	29 January 2005	Hartlepool United	H	0–0	8,967	
R4 (replay)	12 February 2005	Hartlepool United	A	1–0	7,580	Rankin
R5	19 February 2005	Southampton	A	2–2	24,741	Rankin, Sodje
R5 (replay)	1 March 2005	Southampton	H	1–3	11,720	Hutchinson

=== Football League Cup ===
Round	Date	Opponent	Venue	Result	Attendance
R1	24 August 2004	Ipswich Town	A	0–2	10,190

=== Football League Trophy ===
Round	Date	Opponent	Venue	Result	Attendance
SR1	28 September 2004	Milton Keynes Dons	H	0–3	1,679

- Sources: Soccerbase, 11v11

== Playing squad ==
Players' ages are as of the opening day of the 2004–05 season.

No	Position	Name	Nationality	Date of birth (age)	Signed from	Signed in	Notes
Goalkeepers
1	GK	Stuart Nelson	(England)	17 September 1981 (aged 22)	Hucknall Town	2004	
21	GK	Josh Lennie	(England)	26 March 1986 (aged 18)	Youth	2003	Loaned to Carshalton Athletic and Maidenhead United
31	GK	Ademola Bankole	(Nigeria)	9 September 1969 (aged 34)	Maidenhead United	2005	Goalkeeping coach
45	GK	Clark Masters	(England)	31 May 1987 (aged 17)	Youth	2005	
Defenders
2	DF	Michael Dobson	(England)	9 April 1981 (aged 23)	Youth	1999	
3	DF	Andy Myers	(England)	3 November 1973 (aged 30)	Colchester United	2004	
5	DF	Michael Turner	(England)	9 November 1983 (aged 20)	Charlton Athletic	2004	Loaned from Charlton Athletic before transferring permanently
6	DF	Scott B. Fitzgerald	(Republic of Ireland)	13 August 1969 (aged 34)	Colchester United	2004	
12	DF	Andy Frampton	(England)	3 September 1979 (aged 24)	Crystal Palace	2002	
16	DF	Kevin O'Connor	(Republic of Ireland)	24 February 1982 (aged 22)	Youth	2000	
17	DF	Sam Sodje	(Nigeria)	14 July 1980 (aged 24)	Margate	2004	
20	DF	Jamie Palmer	(England)	25 November 1985 (aged 18)	Youth	2005	Loaned to Kingstonian and Staines Town
22	DF	Sean Hillier	(England)	19 April 1986 (aged 18)	Youth	2004	Loaned to Welling United, Hendon and North Greenford United
37	DF	Darius Charles	(England)	10 December 1987 (aged 16)	Youth	2004	
38	DF	Karleigh Osborne	(England)	19 March 1988 (aged 16)	Youth	2004	
42	DF	Ahmet Rifat	(England)	3 January 1986 (aged 18)	Reading	2005	
44	DF	Ryan Watts	(England)	18 May 1988 (aged 16)	Youth	2005	
Midfielders
4	MF	Stewart Talbot (c)	(England)	14 June 1973 (aged 31)	Rotherham United	2004	
7	MF	Eddie Hutchinson	(England)	23 February 1982 (aged 22)	Sutton United	2000	
8	MF	Jay Tabb	(Republic of Ireland)	21 February 1984 (aged 20)	Crystal Palace	2000	
10	MF	Stephen Hunt	(Republic of Ireland)	1 August 1981 (aged 23)	Crystal Palace	2001	
11	MF	Chris Hargreaves	(England)	12 May 1972 (aged 32)	Northampton Town	2004	
15	MF	Alex Rhodes	(England)	23 January 1982 (aged 22)	Newmarket Town	2003	
19	MF	San Lee	(South Korea)	5 October 1985 (aged 18)	West Ham United	2004	Loaned to São Paulo
23	MF	Luke Muldowney	(England)	31 July 1986 (aged 18)	Youth	2004	Loaned to Kingstonian and Staines Town
24	MF	James Morrison	(England)	22 September 1985 (aged 18)	Youth	2004	Loaned to Hendon and Chertsey Town
25	MF	Ryan Peters	(England)	21 August 1987 (aged 16)	Youth	2004	Loaned to Windsor & Eton and Gravesend & Northfleet
26	MF	John Salako	(England)	11 February 1969 (aged 35)	Reading	2004	
28	MF	Jamie Lawrence	(Jamaica)	8 March 1970 (aged 34)	Grimsby Town	2004	
29	MF	Darren Pratley	(England)	22 April 1985 (aged 19)	Fulham	2005	On loan from Fulham
39	MF	Scott Weight	(England)	3 April 1987 (aged 17)	Youth	2004	
40	MF	George Moleski	(England)	27 July 1987 (aged 17)	Youth	2005	
43	MF	Aaron Steele	(England)	1 February 1987 (aged 17)	Youth	2004	
Forwards
9	FW	Isaiah Rankin	(England)	22 May 1978 (aged 26)	Grimsby Town	2004	
14	FW	Matt Harrold	(England)	24 July 1984 (aged 20)	Harlow Town	2003	Loaned to Dagenham & Redbridge and Grimsby Town
18	FW	Deon Burton	(Jamaica)	25 October 1976 (aged 27)	Portsmouth	2004	
30	FW	Scott P. Fitzgerald	(England)	18 November 1979 (aged 24)	Watford	2005	Loaned from Watford before transferring permanently
32	FW	Jerrome Sobers	(England)	18 April 1986 (aged 18)	Ipswich Town	2005	On loan from Ipswich Town
33	FW	Marcus Gayle	(Jamaica)	27 September 1970 (aged 33)	Watford	2005	
41	FW	Charlie Ide	(England)	10 May 1988 (aged 16)	Youth	2005	
Players who left the club mid-season
27	FW	Ben May	(England)	10 March 1984 (aged 20)	Millwall	2004	Returned to Millwall after loan expired
~~29~~	FW	Steve Claridge	(England)	10 April 1966 (aged 38)	Brighton & Hove Albion	2004	Loaned to Wycombe Wanderers, released
~~30~~	DF	Matt Somner	(Wales)	8 December 1982 (aged 21)	Youth	2001	Loaned to Cambridge United, transferred to Cambridge United
~~31~~	GK	Alan Julian	(Northern Ireland)	11 March 1983 (aged 21)	Youth	2001	Transferred to Stevenage Borough
~~32~~	FW	Richard Pacquette	(Dominica)	28 January 1983 (aged 21)	Fisher Athletic	2004	Non-contract
~~32~~	MF	Jay Smith	(England)	29 December 1981 (aged 22)	Youth	2001	Transferred to Farnborough Town

- Source: Soccerbase

== Coaching staff ==
Name	Role
(England) Martin Allen	Manager
(England) Adrian Whitbread	First Team Coach
(Nigeria) Ademola Bankole	Goalkeeping Coach
(England) Damien Doyle	Sports Therapist
(England) Matt Hirons	Physiotherapist
(England) John Griffin	Chief Scout

== Statistics ==
=== Appearances and goals ===
Substitute appearances in brackets.

No	Pos	Nat	Name	League		FA Cup		League Cup		FL Trophy		Play-offs		Total	
No	Pos	Nat	Name	Apps	Goals	Apps	Goals	Apps	Goals	Apps	Goals	Apps	Goals	Apps	Goals
1	GK	(England)	Stuart Nelson	43	0	9	0	1	0	0	0	2	0	55	0
2	DF	(England)	Michael Dobson	13 (5)	1	4	0	1	0	0	0	0	0	18 (5)	1
3	DF	(England)	Andy Myers	6 (4)	0	1	0	1	0	1	0	0	0	9 (4)	0
4	MF	(England)	Stewart Talbot	35 (2)	1	9	1	0 (1)	0	0	0	2	0	46 (3)	2
5	DF	(England)	Michael Turner	45	1	8	0	0	0	0	0	2	0	55	1
6	DF	(Republic of Ireland)	Scott B. Fitzgerald	12	0	1	0	1	0	1	0	0	0	15	0
7	MF	(England)	Eddie Hutchinson	14 (1)	1	5 (1)	1	0	0	0	0	2	0	21 (2)	2
8	MF	(Republic of Ireland)	Jay Tabb	29 (11)	5	5 (4)	1	0 (1)	0	1	0	1 (1)	0	36 (17)	6
9	FW	(England)	Isaiah Rankin	33 (8)	8	8 (1)	2	0 (1)	0	0	0	0 (2)	0	41 (12)	10
10	MF	(Republic of Ireland)	Stephen Hunt	13 (6)	3	1 (3)	0	0	0	1	0	0	0	15 (9)	3
11	MF	(England)	Chris Hargreaves	30	2	6	1	1	0	0	0	2	0	39	3
12	DF	(England)	Andy Frampton	34 (1)	0	6 (1)	1	1	0	0	0	2	1	43 (2)	2
14	FW	(England)	Matt Harrold	6 (13)	0	1 (3)	0	0	0	1	0	0	0	8 (16)	0
15	MF	(England)	Alex Rhodes	4 (18)	3	1 (3)	1	1	0	1	0	0	0	7 (21)	4
16	DF	(Republic of Ireland)	Kevin O'Connor	32 (5)	2	4 (1)	0	1	0	0	0	1	0	38 (6)	2
17	DF	(Nigeria)	Sam Sodje	40	7	8	1	0	0	0	0	2	0	50	8
18	MF	(Jamaica)	Deon Burton	38 (2)	10	7	0	1	0	0	0	2	0	50	10
20	DF	(England)	Jamie Palmer	0	0	0	0	0	0	1	0	0	0	1	0
21	GK	(England)	Josh Lennie	0	0	0	0	0	0	0 (1)	0	0	0	0 (1)	0
22	DF	(England)	Sean Hillier	0	0	0	0	0	0	1	0	0	0	1	0
23	MF	(England)	Luke Muldowney	0	0	0	0	0	0	1	0	0	0	1	0
25	MF	(England)	Ryan Peters	1 (8)	1	0 (1)	0	1	0	1	0	0	0	3 (9)	1
26	MF	(England)	John Salako	30 (5)	4	8 (1)	1	0	0	0	0	0 (1)	0	39 (7)	5
28	MF	(Jamaica)	Jamie Lawrence	8 (6)	0	3 (1)	0	—		1	0	0	0	12 (7)	0
~~29~~	FW	(England)	Steve Claridge	3 (1)	0	0	0	—		—		—		3 (1)	0
~~30~~	DF	(Wales)	Matt Somner	1 (1)	0	0	0	0	0	0	0	—		1 (1)	0
30	FW	(England)	Scott P. Fitzgerald	7 (5)	4	—		—		—		1	0	8 (5)	4
~~31~~	GK	(Northern Ireland)	Alan Julian	0	0	0	0	0	0	1	0	—		1	0
31	GK	(Nigeria)	Ademola Bankole	3	0	—		—		—		0	0	3	0
~~32~~	MF	(England)	Jay Smith	0 (2)	0	0	0	1	0	0	0	—		1 (2)	0
~~32~~	FW	(Dominica)	Richard Pacquette	1	0	0	0	—		—		—		1	0
33	FW	(Jamaica)	Marcus Gayle	4 (2)	0	—		—		—		1 (1)	0	5 (3)	0
37	DF	(England)	Darius Charles	1	0	0	0	0	0	0	0	0	0	1	0
38	DF	(England)	Karleigh Osborne	1	0	0	0	0	0	0	0	0	0	1	0
39	MF	(England)	Scott Weight	0	0	0	0	0	0	0 (1)	0	0	0	0 (1)	0
40	MF	(England)	George Moleski	0 (1)	0	0	0	0	0	0	0	0	0	0 (1)	0
41	FW	(England)	Charlie Ide	0 (1)	0	0	0	0	0	0	0	0	0	0 (1)	0
44	DF	(England)	Ryan Watts	0 (1)	0	0	0	0	0	0	0	0	0	0 (1)	0
	Players loaned in during the season														
27	FW	(England)	Ben May	7 (3)	1	4 (2)	0	—		—		—		11 (5)	1
29	MF	(England)	Darren Pratley	11 (3)	1	—		—		—		2	0	13 (3)	1
32	FW	(England)	Jerrome Sobers	1	1	—		—		—		0	0	1	1

- Players listed in italics left the club mid-season.
- Source: Soccerbase

=== Goalscorers ===
No	Pos	Nat	Player	FL1	FAC	FLC	FLT	FLP	Total
18	FW	(Jamaica)	Deon Burton	10	0	0	0	0	10
9	FW	(England)	Isaiah Rankin	8	2	0	0	0	10
17	DF	(Nigeria)	Sam Sodje	7	1	0	0	0	8
8	MF	(Republic of Ireland)	Jay Tabb	5	1	0	0	0	6
26	MF	(England)	John Salako	4	1	0	0	0	5
30	FW	(England)	Scott P. Fitzgerald	4	—	—	—	0	4
15	MF	(England)	Alex Rhodes	3	1	0	0	0	4
10	MF	(Republic of Ireland)	Stephen Hunt	3	0	0	0	0	3
11	MF	(England)	Chris Hargreaves	2	1	0	0	0	3
16	DF	(Republic of Ireland)	Kevin O'Connor	2	0	0	0	0	2
7	MF	(England)	Eddie Hutchinson	1	1	0	0	0	2
4	MF	(England)	Stewart Talbot	1	1	0	0	0	2
12	DF	(England)	Andy Frampton	0	1	0	0	1	2
27	FW	(England)	Ben May	1	0	—	—	—	1
29	MF	(England)	Darren Pratley	1	—	—	—	0	1
32	FW	(England)	Jerrome Sobers	1	—	—	—	0	1
2	DF	(England)	Michael Dobson	1	0	0	0	0	1
25	MF	(England)	Ryan Peters	1	0	0	0	0	1
5	DF	(England)	Michael Turner	1	0	0	0	0	1
Opponent				1	0	0	0	0	1
Total				57	10	0	0	1	68

- Players listed in italics left the club mid-season.
- Source: Soccerbase

=== Discipline ===
No	Pos	Nat	Player	FL1		FAC		FLC		FLT		FLP		Total		Pts
No	Pos	Nat	Player	Booked	Sent off (straight red)	Booked	Sent off (straight red)	Booked	Sent off (straight red)	Booked	Sent off (straight red)	Booked	Sent off (straight red)	Booked	Sent off (straight red)	Pts
11	MF	(England)	Chris Hargreaves	9	0	1	0	1	0	0	0	0	0	11	0	11
18	FW	(Jamaica)	Deon Burton	5	2	0	0	0	0	0	0	0	0	5	2	11
17	DF	(Nigeria)	Sam Sodje	8	0	1	0	0	0	0	0	1	0	10	0	10
4	MF	(England)	Stewart Talbot	8	0	2	0	0	0	0	0	0	0	10	0	10
9	FW	(England)	Isaiah Rankin	7	0	2	0	0	0	0	0	1	0	9	0	9
12	DF	(England)	Andy Frampton	6	0	1	0	0	0	0	0	1	0	8	0	8
5	DF	(England)	Michael Turner	4	1	0	0	0	0	0	0	1	0	5	1	8
28	MF	(Jamaica)	Jamie Lawrence	5	0	0	0	0	0	0	0	0	0	5	0	5
29	MF	(England)	Darren Pratley	4	0	—		—		—		1	0	5	0	5
3	DF	(England)	Andy Myers	1	1	0	0	0	0	1	0	0	0	2	1	5
8	MF	(Republic of Ireland)	Jay Tabb	4	0	0	0	0	0	0	0	0	0	4	0	4
7	MF	(England)	Eddie Hutchinson	3	0	0	0	0	0	0	0	1	0	4	0	4
27	FW	(England)	Ben May	2	0	1	0	—		—		—		3	0	3
10	MF	(Republic of Ireland)	Stephen Hunt	2	0	1	0	0	0	0	0	0	0	3	0	3
16	DF	(Republic of Ireland)	Kevin O'Connor	2	0	1	0	0	0	0	0	0	0	3	0	3
~~30~~	DF	(Wales)	Matt Somner	0	1	0	0	0	0	0	0	—		0	1	3
6	DF	(Republic of Ireland)	Scott B. Fitzgerald	2	0	0	0	0	0	0	0	0	0	2	0	2
2	DF	(England)	Michael Dobson	1	0	1	0	0	0	0	0	0	0	2	0	2
1	GK	(England)	Stuart Nelson	0	0	1	0	0	0	0	0	1	0	2	0	2
30	FW	(England)	Scott P. Fitzgerald	1	0	—		—		—		0	0	1	0	1
25	MF	(England)	Ryan Peters	1	0	0	0	0	0	0	0	0	0	1	0	1
15	MF	(England)	Alex Rhodes	1	0	0	0	0	0	0	0	0	0	1	0	1
Total				76	5	12	0	1	0	1	0	7	0	97	5	112

- Players listed in italics left the club mid-season.
- Source: ESPN FC

=== International caps ===
No	Pos	Nat	Player	Caps	Goals	Ref
18	FW	(Jamaica)	Deon Burton	1	0	
28	MF	(Jamaica)	Jamie Lawrence	3	0	

=== Management ===
Name	Nat	From	To	Record All Comps					Record League				
Name	Nat	From	To	P	W	D	L	W %	P	W	D	L	W %
Martin Allen	(England)	7 August 2004	16 May 2005	59	25	14	20	42.37|	46	22	9	15	47.83

=== Summary ===
Games played	59 (46 League One, 9 FA Cup, 1 League Cup, 1 Football League Trophy, 2 Football League play-offs)
Games won	25 (22 League One, 3 FA Cup, 0 League Cup, 0 Football League Trophy, 0 Football League play-offs)
Games drawn	14 (9 League One, 5 FA Cup, 0 League Cup, 0 Football League Trophy, 0 Football League play-offs)
Games lost	20 (15 League One, 1 FA Cup, 1 League Cup, 1 Football League Trophy, 2 Football League play-offs)
Goals scored	68 (57 League One, 10 FA Cup, 0 League Cup, 0 Football League Trophy, 1 Football League play-offs)
Goals conceded	76 (60 League One, 8 FA Cup, 2 League Cup, 3 Football League Trophy, 3 Football League play-offs)
Clean sheets	21 (17 League One, 4 FA Cup, 0 League Cup, 0 Football League Trophy, 0 Football League play-offs)
Biggest league win	3–0 versus Stockport County, 28 August 2004
Worst league defeat	3–0 on three occasions, 4–1 on two occasions
Most appearances	55, Stuart Nelson (43 League One, 9 FA Cup, 1 League Cup, 0 Football League Trophy, 2 Football League play-offs)
Top scorer (league)	10, Deon Burton
Top scorer (all competitions)	10, Deon Burton & Isaiah Rankin

== Transfers & loans ==
Players transferred in
Date	Pos.	Name	Previous club	Fee	Ref.
1 July 2004	DF	(Republic of Ireland) Scott B. Fitzgerald	(England) Colchester United	Free	
1 July 2004	MF	(England) Chris Hargreaves	(England) Northampton Town	Free	
1 July 2004	DF	(England) Andy Myers	(England) Colchester United	Free	
1 July 2004	FW	(England) Isaiah Rankin	(England) Grimsby Town	Free	
1 July 2004	DF	(Nigeria) Sam Sodje	(England) Margate	Free	
12 July 2004	MF	(South Korea) San Lee	(England) West Ham United	Free	
20 July 2004	MF	(England) John Salako	(England) Reading	Free	
1 August 2004	FW	(Jamaica) Deon Burton	(England) Portsmouth	Free	
17 September 2004	MF	(Jamaica) Jamie Lawrence	(England) Grimsby Town	Non-contract	
2 November 2004	DF	(England) Michael Turner	(England) Charlton Athletic	Undisclosed	
26 November 2004	FW	(Dominica) Richard Pacquette	(England) Fisher Athletic	Non-contract	
17 December 2004	FW	(England) Steve Claridge	(England) Brighton & Hove Albion	Free	
4 February 2005	GK	(Nigeria) Ademola Bankole	(England) Maidenhead United	Free	
24 March 2005	FW	(England) Scott P. Fitzgerald	(England) Watford	Undisclosed	
24 March 2005	FW	(Jamaica) Marcus Gayle	(England) Watford	Non-contract	
March 2005	DF	(England) Ahmet Rifat	(England) Reading	Non-contract	
Players loaned in
Date from	Pos.	Name	From	Date to	Ref.
4 August 2004	DF	(England) Michael Turner	(England) Charlton Athletic	1 November 2004	
3 December 2004	FW	(England) Ben May	(England) Millwall	23 February 2005	
22 February 2005	DF	(England) Darren Pratley	(England) Fulham	End of season	
4 March 2005	FW	(England) Scott P. Fitzgerald	(England) Watford	23 March 2005	
24 March 2005	FW	(England) Jerrome Sobers	(England) Ipswich Town	End of season	
Players transferred out
Date	Pos.	Name	Subsequent club	Fee	Ref.
5 July 2004	DF	(Senegal) Ibrahima Sonko	(England) Reading	Free	
22 October 2004	MF	(England) Jay Smith	(England) Farnborough Town	Free	
2 February 2005	DF	(Wales) Matt Somner	(England) Cambridge United	Free	
4 February 2005	GK	(Northern Ireland) Alan Julian	(England) Stevenage Borough	Undisclosed	
10 February 2005	GK	(England) Steve Claridge	(England) Wycombe Wanderers	Free	
Players loaned out
Date from	Pos.	Name	To	Date to	Ref.
3 September 2004	MF	(England) Sean Hillier	(England) Welling United	27 September 2004	
September 2004	MF	(England) Ryan Peters	(England) Windsor & Eton	October 2004	
October 2004	GK	(England) Josh Lennie	(England) Carshalton Athletic	January 2005	
1 December 2004	DF	(Wales) Matt Somner	(England) Cambridge United	1 February 2005	
10 December 2004	MF	(England) Ryan Peters	(England) Gravesend & Northfleet	10 January 2005	
17 December 2004	FW	(England) Matt Harrold	(England) Dagenham & Redbridge	17 January 2005	
23 December 2004	MF	(England) Luke Muldowney	(England) Kingstonian	16 March 2005	
23 December 2004	DF	(England) Jamie Palmer	(England) Kingstonian	16 March 2005	
13 January 2005	FW	(England) Steve Claridge	(England) Wycombe Wanderers	9 February 2005	
January 2005	MF	(England) Sean Hillier	(England) Hendon	February 2005	
January 2005	MF	(England) James Morrison	(England) Hendon	February 2005	
February 2005	MF	(England) Sean Hillier	(England) North Greenford United	End of season	
February 2005	GK	(England) Josh Lennie	(England) Maidenhead United	n/a	
February 2005	MF	(England) James Morrison	(England) Chertsey Town	2005	
4 March 2005	FW	(England) Matt Harrold	(England) Grimsby Town	4 May 2005	
March 2005	MF	(England) Luke Muldowney	(England) Staines Town	End of season	
March 2005	DF	(England) Jamie Palmer	(England) Staines Town	End of season	
April 2005	MF	(South Korea) San Lee	(Brazil) São Paulo	30 June 2005	
Players released
Date	Pos.	Name	Subsequent club	Join date	Ref.
3 December 2004	MF	(Dominica) Richard Pacquette	(England) Farnborough Town	7 December 2004	
30 June 2005	FW	(Jamaica) Deon Burton	(England) Rotherham United	11 July 2005	
30 June 2005	DF	(Republic of Ireland) Scott B. Fitzgerald	Retired		
30 June 2005	MF	(England) Sean Hillier	(England) AFC Wimbledon	30 July 2005	
30 June 2005	MF	(Republic of Ireland) Stephen Hunt	(England) Reading	1 July 2005	
30 June 2005	FW	(Jamaica) Jamie Lawrence	(England) Fisher Athletic	2005	
30 June 2005	GK	(England) Josh Lennie	(England) AFC Wimbledon	1 July 2005	
30 June 2005	MF	(England) James Morrison	(England) Chertsey Town	2005	
30 June 2005	MF	(England) Luke Muldowney	(England) Staines Town	2005	
30 June 2005	DF	(England) Andy Myers	Retired		
30 June 2005	DF	(England) Jamie Palmer	(England) Staines Town	2005	
30 June 2005	DF	(England) Ahmet Rifat	(England) Wingate & Finchley	2005	
30 June 2005	MF	(England) John Salako	Retired		
30 June 2005	MF	(England) Scott Weight	(England) Hampton & Richmond Borough	2005	

== Kit ==
Supplier: TFG
Sponsor(s): St. George

Home	Away	Third

Source: Brentford F.C.

== Awards ==
- Supporters' Player of the Year: Sam Sodje
- Players' Player of the Year: Michael Turner
- Most Improved Player of the Year: Kevin O'Connor
- Football League One Manager of the Month: Martin Allen (September 2004)
- Evening Standard Player of the Month: Sam Sodje (February 2005)
- FA Cup Goal of the Round: Isaiah Rankin (fifth round)
