= Jerrome Sobers =

English footballer (born 1986)

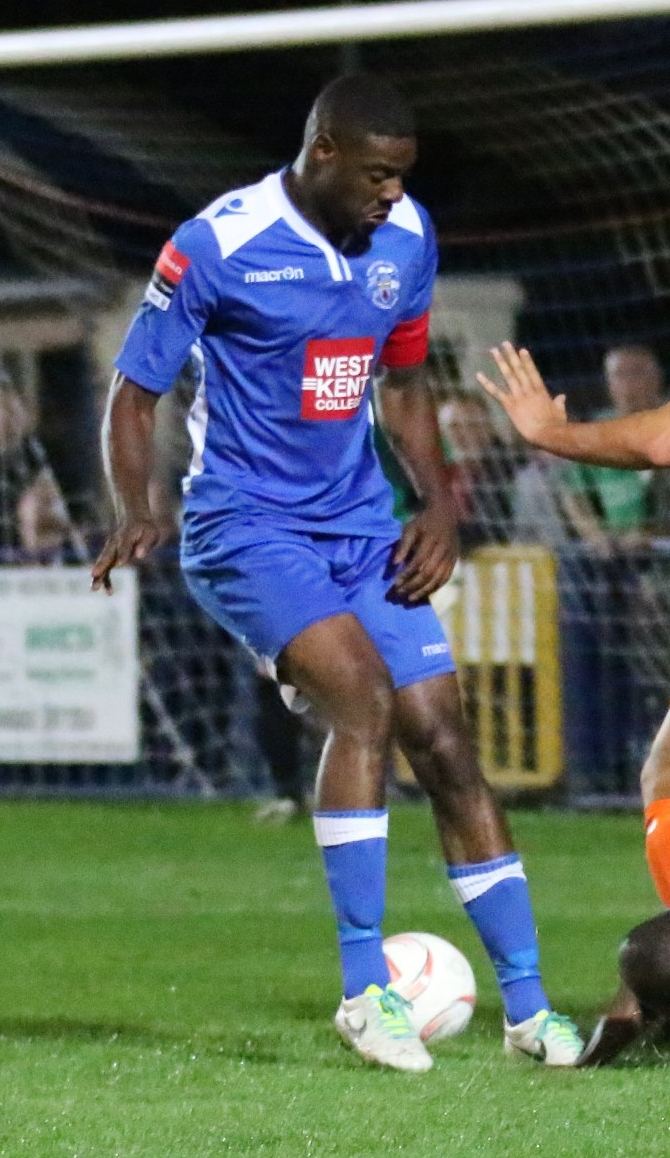
- Sobers playing for Tonbridge Angels in 2014.

Personal information
- Full name: Jerrome Roxin Sobers
- Date of birth: 18 April 1986 (age 40)
- Place of birth: Whitechapel, England
- Height: 1.88 m (6 ft 2 in)
- Position: Centre-back

Senior career*
Years	Team	Apps	(Gls)
–2004	Ford United		
2004–2005	Ipswich Town	0	(0)
2005	→ Brentford (loan)	1	(1)
2005–2007	Chelmsford City	41	(0)
2007	Bromley	19	(0)
2007–2008	Braintree Town	10	(0)
2008–2012	Bromley	101	(4)
2012	Billericay Town	15	(1)
2012–2013	Bromley	3	(0)
2012–2013	→ Kingstonian (dual-reg)	2	(0)
2013–2014	Maidstone United	25	(1)
2014–2017	Tonbridge Angels	43	(5)
2017	Hastings United	16	(2)
2017–2018	Canvey Island	15	(0)
2018	Walthamstow	0	(0)
- * Club domestic league appearances and goals as of 14:17, 26 July 2019 (UTC)

Jerrome Roxin Sobers (born 18 April 1986) is an English former footballer who played as a centre-back.

== Career ==
After beginning his career at Ford United, making his first team debut aged 17, Sobers was spotted and signed by Ipswich Town for £10,000 in the summer of 2004.

He was sent on loan to Brentford in March 2005 and scored on his only appearance as the Bees beat Hull City 2–1 in League One. It was to be Sobers' only appearance on loan at Brentford and he was then released by Ipswich at the end of the 2004–05 season.

Sobers then signed for Chelmsford City, spending two years at the Essex club, before joining Bromley. He then quickly moved onto Braintree Town, but returned to Bromley in 2008, spending nearly four years at the club before signing for Billericay Town in 2011, helping them to win the 2011–12 Isthmian League Premier Division.

Sobers then returned to Bromley in the summer of 2012, but joined Kingstonian on dual-registration in November 2012. He then signed for Isthmian League Division One South promotion-chasers Maidstone United on 16 February 2013. Sobers left Maidstone at the end of the 2013–14 season. Sobers completed a full season with the Stones having joined the season before from Bromley. During this campaign he made 32 appearances in the 2013–14 season.

Sobers joined Tonbridge Angels in June 2014.

== Career statistics ==
Appearances and goals by club, season and competition
Club	Season	League			FA Cup		League Cup		Other		Total	
Club	Season	Division	Apps	Goals	Apps	Goals	Apps	Goals	Apps	Goals	Apps	Goals
Ipswich Town	2004–05	Championship	0	0	0	0	0	0	―		0	0
Brentford (loan)	2004–05	League One	1	1	―		―		0	0	1	1
Chelmsford City	2005–06	Isthmian League Premier Division	32	1	0	0	―		2 (Note: Appearances in Isthmian League Cup)	0	34	1
Chelmsford City	2006–07	Isthmian League Premier Division	3	0	0	0	―		2	0	5	0
Chelmsford City	Total		35	1	0	0	―		4	0	39	1
Bromley	2006–07	Isthmian League Premier Division	19	0	0	0	―		2 (Note: Appearances in Isthmian League Premier Division play-offs)	0	21	0
Braintree Town	2007–08	Conference South	10	0	0	0	―		0	0	10	0
Bromley	2007–08	Conference South	26	0	―		―		0	0	26	0
Bromley	2008–09	Conference South	27	0	0	0	―		0	0	33	0
Bromley	2009–10	Conference South	19	1	0	0	―		0	0	21	1
Bromley	2010–11	Conference South	28	3	3	0	―		3 (Note: Two appearances and one goal in Kent Senior Cup; one appearance in FA Trophy)	1	34	4
Bromley	2011–12	Conference South	1	0	0	0	―		0	0	1	0
Bromley	Total		101	4	3	0	―		3	1	107	5
Billericay Town	2011–12	Isthmian League Premier Division	15	1	―		―		―		15	1
Bromley	2012–13	Conference South	3	0	2	0	―		2 (Note: One appearance in Kent Senior Cup; one appearance in London Senior Cup)	0	7	0
Maidstone United	2013–14	Isthmian League Premier Division	25	1	2	0	―		5 (Note: Three appearances in FA Trophy; two appearances in Isthmian League Cup)	0	32	1
Tonbridge Angels	2014–15	Isthmian League Premier Division	14	2	1	0	―		3 (Note: Appearances in FA Trophy)	0	18	2
Tonbridge Angels	2015–16	Isthmian League Premier Division	24	3	0	0	―		6 (Note: Two appearances in FA Trophy; two appearances in Isthmian League Cup; one appearance in Isthmian League Premier Division play-offs; one appearance in Kent Senior Cup)	0	33	3
Tonbridge Angels	2016–17	Isthmian League Premier Division	5	0	2	0	―		4 (Note: Three appearances and one goal in FA Trophy; one appearance in Kent Senior Cup)	1	11	1
Tonbridge Angels	Total		43	5	3	0	―		13	1	59	6
Hastings United	2016–17	Isthmian League First Division South	16	2	―		―		1 (Note: Appearance in Isthmian League First Division South play-offs)	0	17	2
Canvey Island	2017–18	Isthmian League North Division	15	0	0	0	―		1	0	16	0
Walthamstow	2018–19	Essex Senior League	0	0	1	0	―		1 (Note: One appearance in FA Vase)	0	2	0
Career total			264	14	11	0	0	0	30	2	305	16

== Honours ==
Bromley

- Isthmian League Premier Division play-offs: 2007

Billericay Town

- Isthmian League Premier Division: 2011–12

Maidstone FC

Isthmian league division one south playoffs
