= Karleigh Osborne =

English footballer

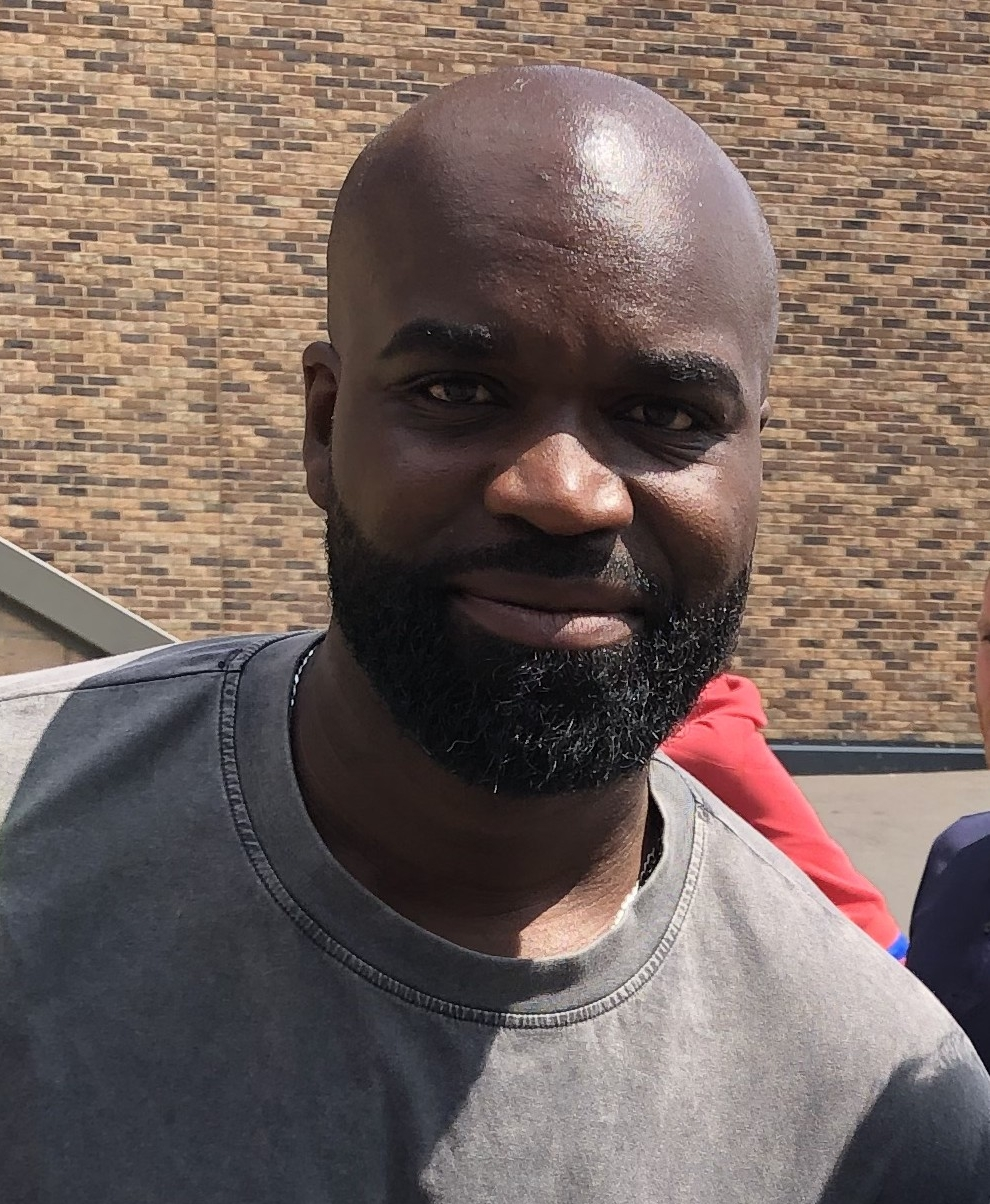
- Osborne in 2025.

Personal information
- Full name: Karleigh Anthony Jonathan Osborne
- Date of birth: 19 March 1988 (age 38)
- Place of birth: Southall, England
- Height: 6 ft 2 in (1.88 m)
- Position: Central defender

Team information
- Current team: Brentford (club ambassador)

Youth career
- South Ruislip Rangers
- –2004: Queens Park Rangers
- 2004–2005: Brentford

Senior career*
Years	Team	Apps	(Gls)
2005–2012	Brentford	161	(6)
2006	→ Hayes (loan)	9	(2)
2008	→ Oxford United (loan)	6	(0)
2008	→ Eastbourne Borough (loan)	3	(1)
2012–2014	Millwall	14	(1)
2013–2014	→ Bristol City (loan)	7	(0)
2014–2016	Bristol City	21	(1)
2015	→ Colchester United (loan)	4	(0)
2015–2016	→ AFC Wimbledon (loan)	23	(0)
2016–2017	Plymouth Argyle	1	(0)
2017	Kilmarnock	1	(0)
2017–2018	Grimsby Town	10	(0)
2018–2019	Aldershot Town	8	(0)
2019	Braintree Town	1	(0)
Total		269	(11)

Managerial career
- 2018–2025: Brentford Women
- * Club domestic league appearances and goals

Karleigh Anthony Jonathan Osborne (born 19 March 1988) is an English former professional footballer and manager, who is an ambassador of Premier League club Brentford.

As a player, Osborne was a central defender and made over 160 Football League appearances for Brentford between 2005 and 2012. In his subsequent nomadic Football League career, he played for Millwall, Bristol City, Colchester United, AFC Wimbledon, Plymouth Argyle and Grimsby Town. Osborne also played in the Scottish Premiership for Kilmarnock and in non-League football for Hayes, Oxford United, Eastbourne Borough, Aldershot Town and Braintree Town. After retiring as a player, Osborne managed Brentford Women between 2018 and 2025.

== Playing career ==
=== Brentford ===
==== Early years (2004–2006) ====
A central defender, Osborne began his career with amateur club South Ruislip Rangers and spent a period with Queens Park Rangers, before trialling with youth system at Brentford at the age of 15, on the recommendation of Bobby Ross. Osborne embarked on a scholarship at the beginning of the 2004–05 season and progressed sufficiently to be named as a substitute in a youthful squad for a Football League Trophy first round match versus Milton Keynes Dons on 28 September 2004. Osborne remained unused during the 3–0 defeat and was named on the bench on two further occasions, before making his debut on the final day of the 2004–05 regular season versus Hull City. He played the full 90 minutes of the 2–1 comeback victory, but did not appear during the Bees' 2005 League One play-off campaign. Osborne signed a professional contract and made three appearances during the 2005–06 season. He spent the final two months of the season on loan at Conference South club Hayes.

==== Breakthrough (2006–2009) ====
An injury crisis early in 2006–07 season under new manager Leroy Rosenior saw Osborne make regular substitute appearances in youthful matchday squads through the first six weeks of the season, before he broke into the starting lineup at right back in late September 2006. He made 24 appearances during a disastrous season, which ended with Brentford's relegation to League Two. Osborne signed a new two-year contract in June 2007 and he made semi-regular appearances during the 2007–08 and 2008–09 League Two seasons.

Though Osborne captained the team on occasion during the 2007–08 and 2008–09 seasons, a lack of confidence meant that he spent periods out of favour with manager Andy Scott, which necessitated spells away on loan at Conference Premier clubs Oxford United and Eastbourne Borough. Osborne scored the first senior goal of his career in a 1–0 win over Shrewsbury Town on 5 January 2008, when he converted a header from a Ryan Dickson corner. He followed up with four further goals during the 2008–09 season, which included a header in a 2–0 victory over Luton Town on the final day, which crowned Brentford's League Two title-winning season and gave Osborne the first silverware of his career.

==== Final years (2009–2012) ====
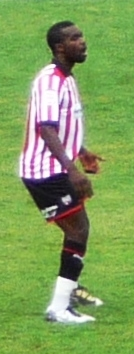
Osborne playing for Brentford in August 2011

Back in League One, Osborne began the 2009–10 season out of favour and made sporadic appearances from the bench as cover in central defence and full back. He spurned opportunities to move away on loan and finally broke into the starting lineup in March 2010. After being challenged by manager Andy Scott to hold onto his starting spot, Osborne started in 11 of Brentford's 13 remaining matches of the season and signed a new two-year contract in May 2010. Osborne fully established himself in the team and made a career-high 51 appearances during the 2010–11 season, which featured a run to the 2011 Football League Trophy Final.

Talks over a new three-year contract began in January 2011, which went unresolved after the sacking of manager Andy Scott and the appointment of interim manager Nicky Forster a matter of weeks later. Injury problems meant that Osborne was in and out of the team under new manager Uwe Rösler during the 2011–12 season and he made just 27 appearances. In a U-turn, he rejected a new contract and was released in June 2012. During eight seasons at Griffin Park, Osborne made 185 appearances and scored six goals.

=== Millwall ===
On 13 July 2012, Osborne signed a two-year contract with Championship club Millwall on a two-year contract. He suffered with injury during his first season at The Den and finished 2012–13 with 16 appearances and one goal, which came in a 2–1 defeat to Blackburn Rovers on 23 April 2013. Osborne was surplus to requirements during the early months of the 2013–14 season and made just one appearance before departing the club on loan on 31 October 2013, which was later extended and turned into a permanent deal on 7 January 2014. He made 17 appearances and scored one goal during 18 months with Millwall.

=== Bristol City ===
==== 2013–14 ====
On 31 October 2013, Osborne joined League One club Bristol City on a one-month loan, which was later extended to 5 January 2014. He was signed as cover for injured loanee Lewis Dunk and immediately went into the starting lineup. Despite missing almost a month after incurring a suspension for a red card received at the end of November, Osborne regained his place upon his return and joined the club on a 2 1/2 year contract for an undisclosed fee on 7 January 2014. He scored his first goal for the Robins against his former club Brentford, in a 3–1 defeat at Griffin Park on 28 January. Osborne remained a regular starter through to the end of the 2013–14 season and finished the campaign with 29 appearances and one goal.

==== 2014–15 and loan to Colchester United ====
After suffering a "horrific injury" to his shin during the 2014–15 pre-season, Osborne returned to fitness in mid-August 2014, but thereafter was entirely out of favour with manager Steve Cotterill and made just three appearances during the club's League One title-winning season, though he did receive a promotion medal. He did not feature at all in the club's Football League Trophy-winning campaign. On 26 February 2015, Osborne joined League One club Colchester United on loan until the end of the 2014–15 season. He made four appearances before suffering an injury, which led to his recall to Ashton Gate on 4 April 2015.

==== 2015–16 and loan to AFC Wimbledon ====
On 2 July 2015, Osborne joined League Two club AFC Wimbledon on a season-long loan. He was a regular pick until his season was ended by a medial ligament injury suffered in training in February 2016. The injury meant that Osborne sat out the Dons' 2016 victorious League Two play-off campaign, though he received a winners' medal. He made 25 appearances during the 2015–16 season and was released by Bristol City in June 2016, when his contract expired. He made 32 appearances and scored one goal during 2 1/2 seasons with the Robins.

=== Plymouth Argyle ===
On 24 June 2016, Osborne joined League Two club Plymouth Argyle on a free transfer. A thigh injury suffered early during the 2016–17 pre-season kept Osborne out until October 2016 and as manager Derek Adams' fourth-choice central defender, he made just two appearances before being released from his contract on 16 January 2017.

=== Kilmarnock ===
Osborne moved to Scotland to join Premiership club Kilmarnock on a two-year contract on 16 January 2017. Five days later, he made his debut versus Hamilton Academical in the Scottish Cup fourth round and conceded a last-minute penalty, which resulted in a 1–0 defeat. Osborne was substituted due to injury in the following match and would not appear for the club again before his departure in July 2017.

=== Grimsby Town ===
On 26 July 2017, Osborne returned to England to join League Two club Grimsby Town on a one-year contract, with the option of a further year. Aside from a run of starts in January and February 2018, Osborne was barely utilised by manager Russell Slade and was released at the end of the 2017–18 season. He made 13 appearances for the Mariners.

=== Aldershot Town ===
On 1 August 2018, Osborne signed a one-year contract with National League club Aldershot Town and was named as captain of the team. Calf, achilles and quad injuries saw him make just 9 appearances before his contract was terminated by mutual consent on 4 February 2019.

=== Braintree Town ===
On 1 March 2019, Osborne joined National League strugglers Braintree Town on a free transfer and made just one appearance before the end of the 2018–19 season. He announced his retirement from football in June 2019.

== Coaching career ==
Osborne has a UEFA B Licence and began his coaching career during the 2015–16 season with Brentford Women. He was appointed to the role of head coach on a permanent basis in July 2018. Assisted by former Brentford youth teammate Sean Hillier, Osborne coached the team to three promotions and three cup wins before stepping down at the end of the 2024–25 season. To mark his achievements, he was presented with a Special Recognition Award by the club.

Ahead of the 2020–21 season, Osborne was appointed first team coach and defensive strategist at Southern League Premier Division South club Walton Casuals. The club was dissolved in June 2022.

== Other roles ==
In July 2025, Osborne was appointed a club ambassador of Brentford.

== Personal life ==
Osborne lives in Isleworth and is an Arsenal supporter. Former Brentford teammate Ryan Peters is godfather to his son.

== Career statistics ==
Appearances and goals by club, season and competition
Club	Season	League			National cup (Note: Includes FA Cup, Scottish Cup)		League cup (Note: Includes EFL Cup)		Other		Total	
Club	Season	Division	Apps	Goals	Apps	Goals	Apps	Goals	Apps	Goals	Apps	Goals
Brentford	2004–05	League One	1	0	0	0	0	0	0	0	1	0
Brentford	2005–06	League One	1	0	0	0	1	0	1 (Note: Appearance(s) in EFL Trophy)	0	3	0
Brentford	2006–07	League One	21	0	0	0	2	0	1	0	24	0
Brentford	2007–08	League Two	29	1	1	0	0	0	1	0	31	1
Brentford	2008–09	League Two	23	4	2	0	0	0	1	0	26	4
Brentford	2009–10	League One	19	0	1	0	1	0	1	0	22	0
Brentford	2010–11	League One	42	1	1	0	4	0	4	0	51	1
Brentford	2011–12	League One	25	0	0	0	1	0	1	0	27	0
Brentford	Total		161	6	5	0	9	0	10	0	185	6
Hayes (loan)	2005–06	Conference South	9	2	—		—		—		9	2
Oxford United (loan)	2008–09	Conference Premier	6	0	—		—		—		6	0
Eastbourne Borough (loan)	2008–09	Conference Premier	3	1	—		—		—		3	1
Millwall	2012–13	Championship	13	1	3	0	0	0	—		16	1
Millwall	2013–14	Championship	1	0	—		0	0	—		1	0
Millwall	Total		14	1	3	0	0	0	—		17	1
Bristol City	2013–14	League One	27	1	2	0	—		—		29	1
Bristol City	2014–15	League One	1	0	1	0	1	0	0	0	3	0
Bristol City	Total		28	1	3	0	1	0	0	0	32	1
Colchester United (loan)	2014–15	League One	4	0	—		—		—		4	0
AFC Wimbledon (loan)	2015–16	League Two	23	0	1	0	0	0	1	0	25	0
Plymouth Argyle	2016–17	League Two	1	0	0	0	0	0	1	0	2	0
Kilmarnock	2016–17	Scottish Premiership	1	0	1	0	—		—		2	0
Grimsby Town	2017–18	League Two	10	0	0	0	0	0	3	0	13	0
Aldershot Town	2018–19	National League	8	0	0	0	—		1 (Note: Appearance in FA Trophy)	0	9	0
Braintree Town	2018–19	National League	1	0	—		—		—		1	0
Career total			269	11	13	0	10	0	16	0	308	11

== Honours ==
=== Player ===
Brentford

- Football League Two: 2008–09
- Football League Trophy runner-up: 2010–11

Bristol City

- Football League One: 2014–15

AFC Wimbledon

- Football League Two play-offs: 2016

=== Manager ===
Brentford Women

- Greater London Women's League First Division: 2019–20
- Greater London Women's League Premier Division promotion: 2020–21
- London and South East Women's Regional League First Division North: 2024–25
- Capital Women's Intermediate Cup: 2023–24, 2024–25
- Trophy Cup: 2023–24

=== Individual ===
- Brentford Special Recognition Award
