= Ryan Peters (footballer) =

English footballer (born 1987)

Personal information
- Full name: Ryan Vincent Peters
- Date of birth: 21 August 1987 (age 39)
- Place of birth: Wandsworth, England
- Height: 5 ft 8 in (1.73 m)
- Positions: Right back; utility player

Team information
- Current team: Maidenhead United (manager)

Youth career
- –2004: Brentford

Senior career*
Years	Team	Apps	(Gls)
2004–2008	Brentford	36	(2)
2004–2005	→ Gravesend & Northfleet (loan)	1	(0)
2006	→ Crawley Town (loan)	3	(1)
2007	→ AFC Wimbledon (loan)	5	(0)
2007–2008	→ Margate (loan)	15	(1)
2008–2009	Margate	48	(8)
2009–2015	Braintree Town	186	(2)
2015–2019	Maidenhead United	62	(0)
Total		356	(14)

International career
- England Futsal

Managerial career
- 2015–2017: Brentford Women
- 2025–: Maidenhead United
- * Club domestic league appearances and goals

Ryan Vincent Peters (born 21 August 1987) is an English retired semi-professional footballer who played as a right back. He is currently manager of National League South club Maidenhead United.

A product of the Brentford youth system, Peters began his senior career with the club in the Football League. After his release in 2008, he dropped into non-League football. Peters played for Margate, Braintree Town and Maidenhead United until his retirement in 2019. Beginning in 2015, he served Maidenhead United as first team coach and then assistant manager. He became interim manager of the club in November 2025 and was appointed to the role permanently in May 2026.

== Playing career ==
=== Brentford ===
After beginning his career as a forward and winger, Peters graduated from the Brentford youth team to the first team during the 2004–05 League One season and made his senior debut as a 51st-minute substitute for Jay Tabb in a 3–0 defeat to Peterborough United on 21 August 2004. He made his first start for the club in the following match, lasting 54 minutes of a 2–0 League Cup first round defeat to Ipswich Town, before being substituted for Jay Tabb. After a period away on loan in late 2004, Peters returned to the team in early 2005 and signed a one-year professional contract, with the option of a further year, effective from the end of the 2004–05 season. He scored the first senior goal of his career in a 3–3 draw with Sheffield Wednesday on 25 February 2005. Peters finished the 2004–05 season with 12 appearances and one goal.

Over the course of the 2005–06 and 2006–07 seasons, Peters failed to break through into the first team and after Brentford's relegation to League Two and the appointment of new manager Terry Butcher in 2007, he fell out of favour. He made six appearances in the first two months of the 2007–08 season before leaving on loan and then being released in January 2008. During 3 1/2 seasons at Griffin Park, Peters made 47 appearances and scored two goals.

=== Non-League football ===
While a Brentford player, Peters had loan spells at Conference Premier clubs Gravesend & Northfleet, Crawley Town and Isthmian League Premier Division club AFC Wimbledon. He joined Isthmian League Premier Division club Margate on loan in October 2007 and joined the club on a permanent transfer in January 2008. He moved up to the Conference South to join Braintree Town in 2009 and one season later, he won the first silverware of his career when the Iron won the 2010–11 Conference South title. He played on for four further seasons at Braintree Town before leaving Cressing Road at the end of the 2014–15 season, by which time he had made 202 appearances and scored two goals for the club. Peters dropped back down to the National League South to follow former Braintree Town manager Alan Devonshire to Maidenhead United in May 2015. In his second season with the Magpies, he helped the club to the National League South title. He played on into the 2018–19 season, which was his last as a player.

== International career ==
Peters was capped by England Futsal in 2008.

== Coaching career ==
In 2012, Peters returned to Brentford to work in the club's Community Sports Trust and as of October 2020, he was the Trust's Elite Development Programme coach. From 2015 to May 2017, he coached Brentford Women. In May 2015, Peters joined National League South club Maidenhead United as player-first team coach and he was promoted into the role of assistant manager at the end of the 2018–19 season. Peters was appointed interim manager on 30 November 2025 following the retirement of his predecessor Alan Devonshire. He guided the team to a seventh-place finish in the 2025–26 National League South, with the club's season ending in a playoff quarter final defeat. In May 2026, Peters signed a two-year contract to manage the team on a permanent basis.

== Personal life ==
Peters is godfather to former Brentford teammate Karleigh Osborne's son.

== Career statistics ==
Appearances and goals by club, season and competition
Club	Season	League			FA Cup		League Cup		Other		Total	
Club	Season	Division	Apps	Goals	Apps	Goals	Apps	Goals	Apps	Goals	Apps	Goals
Brentford	2004–05	League One	9	1	1	0	1	0	1 (Note: Appearances in Football League Trophy)	0	12	1
Brentford	2005–06	League One	10	1	2	0	1	0	1	0	14	1
Brentford	2006–07	League One	13	0	0	0	0	0	2	0	15	0
Brentford	2007–08	League Two	4	0	—		1	0	1	0	6	0
Brentford	Total		36	2	3	0	3	0	5	0	47	2
Gravesend & Northfleet (loan)	2004–05	Conference Premier	1	0	—		—		—		1	0
Crawley Town (loan)	2006–07	Conference Premier	3	1	—		—		1 (Note: Appearance(s) in FA Trophy)	0	4	1
AFC Wimbledon (loan)	2006–07	Isthmian League Premier Division	5	0	—		—		—		5	0
Margate	2007–08	Isthmian League Premier Division	30	2	—		—		1 (Note: Appearance in Isthmian League Cup)	0	31	2
Margate	2008–09	Isthmian League Premier Division	33	7	0	0	—		1	0	34	7
Margate	Total		63	9	0	0	—		2	0	65	9
Braintree Town	2009–10	Conference South	38	0	0	0	—		0	0	38	0
Braintree Town	2010–11	Conference South	21	0	0	0	—		1	0	22	0
Braintree Town	2011–12	Conference Premier	26	0	1	0	—		1	0	28	0
Braintree Town	2012–13	Conference Premier	31	0	1	0	—		1	0	33	0
Braintree Town	2013–14	Conference Premier	39	1	3	0	—		2	0	44	1
Braintree Town	2014–15	Conference Premier	31	1	3	0	—		3	0	37	1
Braintree Town	Total		186	2	8	0	—		8	0	202	2
Maidenhead United	2015–16	National League South	18	0	3	0	—		2	0	23	0
Maidenhead United	2016–17	National League South	31	0	0	0	—		1 (Note: Appearance in Berks & Bucks Senior Cup)	0	32	0
Maidenhead United	2017–18	National League	13	0	1	0	—		2 (Note: 1 appearance in FA Trophy, 1 appearance in Berks & Bucks Senior Cup)	0	16	0
Maidenhead United	2018–19	National League	0	0	0	0	—		1	0	1	0
Maidenhead United	Total		62	0	4	0	—		6	0	72	0
Career total			356	14	15	0	3	0	22	0	396	14

== Managerial statistics ==
As of match played 29 April 2026

Managerial record by team and tenure
Team	Nat	From	To	Record					Ref
Team	Nat	From	To	G	W	D	L	Win %	Ref
Maidenhead United (interim)	(England)	30 November 2025	Present	28	14	8	6	50.00	
Total				28	14	8	6	50.00	―

== Honours ==
Braintree Town

- Conference South: 2010–11

Maidenhead United

- National League South: 2016–17
