= Middlesex Senior Charity Cup =

- Sport: Football
- Founded: 1901
- No. of teams: 16
- Country: England
- Most recent champion: Uxbridge

The Middlesex Senior Charity Cup is a knock-out system football competition that has been running since 1901. It was presented in 1901 by C.S. Goldmann, Esq. and was first played for in the 1901–02 season, the first winners being Clapton Orient. The competition is run mainly for non-league clubs in the region, although league sides have been known to enter the competition, such as Barnet, Brentford Chelsea Tottenham Hotspur and Q.P.R. Hayes have won the competition the most times, with 15 wins (their first victory came in 1932 and their most recent in 1991).

In 1988, the final, sponsored by Russell Grant in which Hendon beat Wembley 2–0, was played at Wembley Stadium.

On 25 April 2007, Harrow Borough retained the Cup for a second year by beating Brook House at Staines Town's Wheatsheaf Park 5–4 on penalties after the match had finished 0–0 after extra time. The 2009–10 season holders were North Greenford United, who beat the previous holders, Enfield Town, 1–0 in the final at Hampton and Richmond Borough's Beveree Stadium. Enfield Town had beaten Hillingdon Borough 4–1 after extra time on 30 April 2008 at Hayes and Yeading's Church Road stadium. In the 2008–09 season, the competition was cancelled after one first round match had been played.

The 2011/12 final was contested between two sides from the Southern Football League, as Northwood played Ashford Town. Northwood overcame rivals Uxbridge 3–2 in the semi-final, whilst Ashford Town comprehensively beat Rayners Lane 4–0 to also progress to the final. The game was played on Bank Holiday Monday, 7 May at Grosvenor Vale in Ruislip, home of Wealdstone.

Ashford won the game 4–2 on penalties after it had finished 4–4 at the end of 90 minutes. Town had battled back from 3–0 down against Northwood to lead 4–3 but Romaine Walker's equaliser took the game to spot kicks.

Uxbridge won back to back editions of the cup. in 2012–13 they defeated a youthful Brentford side 5–2, after trailing 2–0 at half time. They retained the trophy in 2013–14 with a hard-fought 3–1 victory over Wembley at Vale Farm.

The 2014–15 final saw Harrow Borough, who had already won the 2014-15 Middlesex Senior Cup, beat Cockfosters 3–0 in the final on Saturday 1 August to complete the 'Middlesex double'.

The 2015–16 final saw Cockfosters, in the final for a second straight season, face Hanworth Villa. However Hanworth Villa would claim a 2–0 win on 2 May 2016 in the final played at Chestnut Avenue, the home of Northwood FC.

Since then, Ashford Town (Middlesex) in 2016–17, Hanworth Villa (2017–18) and Uxbridge (2018–19 and 2021–22) have won the competition, either side of COVID-19 disruptions that saw the 2019–20 competition abandoned, and the 2020–21 competition cancelled.

The 2022–23 final saw Broadfields United win the competition for the very first time, beating Northwood 1–0 in the final played at Honeycroft - the home of Uxbridge.

Uxbridge regained the trophy in the 2023–24 season defeating North Greenford United 2–1 in the final at Bedfont Sports FC.

Broadfields United won the competition for the second time (and second time in three seasons) in 2024–25, with a 1–0 victory over Southall. The final was again held at Bedfont Sports FC.

Uxbridge would regain the trophy again in 2026-26, by beating Holders Broadfields United 4-2 in the final held once more at Bedfont Sports FC.

== Winners ==
1901–02 Clapton Orient
1902–03 West Hampstead
1903–04 Ealing
1904–05 Ealing
1905–06 West Hampstead
1906–07 Shepherds Bush
1907–08 Uxbridge
1908–09 Hounslow
1909–10 Enfield
1910–11 Southall
1911–12 Southall
1912–13 Uxbridge
1913–14 Southall
1914–19 No Competition
1919–20 Enfield
1920–21 Botwell Mission
1921–22 Hampstead Town
1922–23 Southall & Botwell Mission (joint holders)
1923–24 Southall & Botwell Mission (joint holders)
1924–25 Barnet
1925–26 Botwell Mission
1926–27 Barnet & Hampstead Town (joint holders)
1927–28 Southall
1928–29 Botwell Mission
1929–30 Wealdstone
1930–31 Wealdstone
1931–32 Enfield
1932–33 Hayes
1933–34 Hayes
1934–35 Uxbridge Town
1935–36 Golders Green
1936–37 Southall
1937–38 Wealdstone
1938–39 Wealdstone
1939–40 Wealdstone
1940–41* Wealdstone
1941–42* Wealdstone
1942–43* Finchley
1943–44* Tufnell Park
1944–45* Golders Green
1945–46 Golders Green
1946–47 Hendon
1947–48 Hendon
1948–49 Hayes
1949–50 Wealdstone
1950–51 Finchley
1951–52 Southall
1952–53 Hounslow Town
1953–54 Hendon
1954–55 Hayes
1955–56 Hounslow Town
1956–57 Hendon
1957–58 Finchley
1958–59 Enfield
1959–60 Hounslow Town
1960–61 Enfield
1961–62 Enfield & Hounslow Town (joint holders)
1962–63 Hayes
1963–64 Wealdstone
1964–65 Finchley
1965–66 Hounslow Town
1966–67 No Competition
1967–68 Wealdstone & Wembley (joint holders)
1968–69 Southall
1969–70 Hampton
1970–71 Hayes
1971–72 Hayes
1972–73 Hayes
1973–74 Finchley
1974–75 Hayes
1975–76 Hendon
1976–77 Hendon
1977–78 Hillingdon Borough
1978–79 Hendon
1979–80 Harrow Borough
1980–81 Wembley & Wealdstone (joint winners)
1981–82 Uxbridge
1982–83 Wembley
1983–84 Southall
1984–85 Hendon
1985–86 Kingsbury Town
1986–87 Wembley
1987–88 Hendon
1988–89 Chelsea
1989–90 Chelsea
1990–91 Hayes
1991–92 Chelsea
1992–93 Harrow Borough
1993–94 Staines Town
1994–95 Wembley
1995–96 Hampton
1996–97 Edgware Town
1997–98 Hampton
1998–99 Hampton
1999–00 Ashford Town (Middlesex)
2000–01 No Competition
2001–02 Enfield Town
2002–03 Feltham
2003–04 Wealdstone
2004–05 Yeading
2005–06 Harrow Borough
2006–07 Harrow Borough
2007–08 Enfield Town
2008–09 No Competition
2009–10 North Greenford United
2010–11 Wealdstone
2011–12 Ashford Town (Middlesex)
2012–13 Uxbridge
2013–14 Uxbridge
2014–15 Harrow Borough
2015–16 Hanworth Villa
2016–17 Ashford Town (Middlesex)
2017–18 Hanworth Villa
2018–19 Uxbridge
2019–20 Competition abandoned due to the Covid pandemic
2020–21 No Competition
2021–22 Uxbridge
2022–23 Broadfields United
2023–24 Uxbridge
2024–25 Broadfields United
2025–26 Uxbridge

== See also ==
- Middlesex County Football Association
- Middlesex Senior Cup
- George Ruffell Memorial Shield
