= 2011–12 Brentford F.C. season =

English football team season

Brentford
2011–12 season
- Chairman: Greg Dyke
- Manager: Uwe Rösler
- Stadium: Griffin Park
- League One: 9th
- FA Cup: Second round
- Football League Cup: First round
- Football League Trophy: Semi-final
- Top goalscorer: League: Gary Alexander (12); All: Gary Alexander (14)
- Highest home attendance: 8,095
- Lowest home attendance: 3,015
- Average home league attendance: 5,643
Home colours	Away colours

During the 2011–12 English football season, Brentford competed in Football League One. In a season of transition under new manager Uwe Rösler, the Bees finished in 9th place.

== Season summary ==
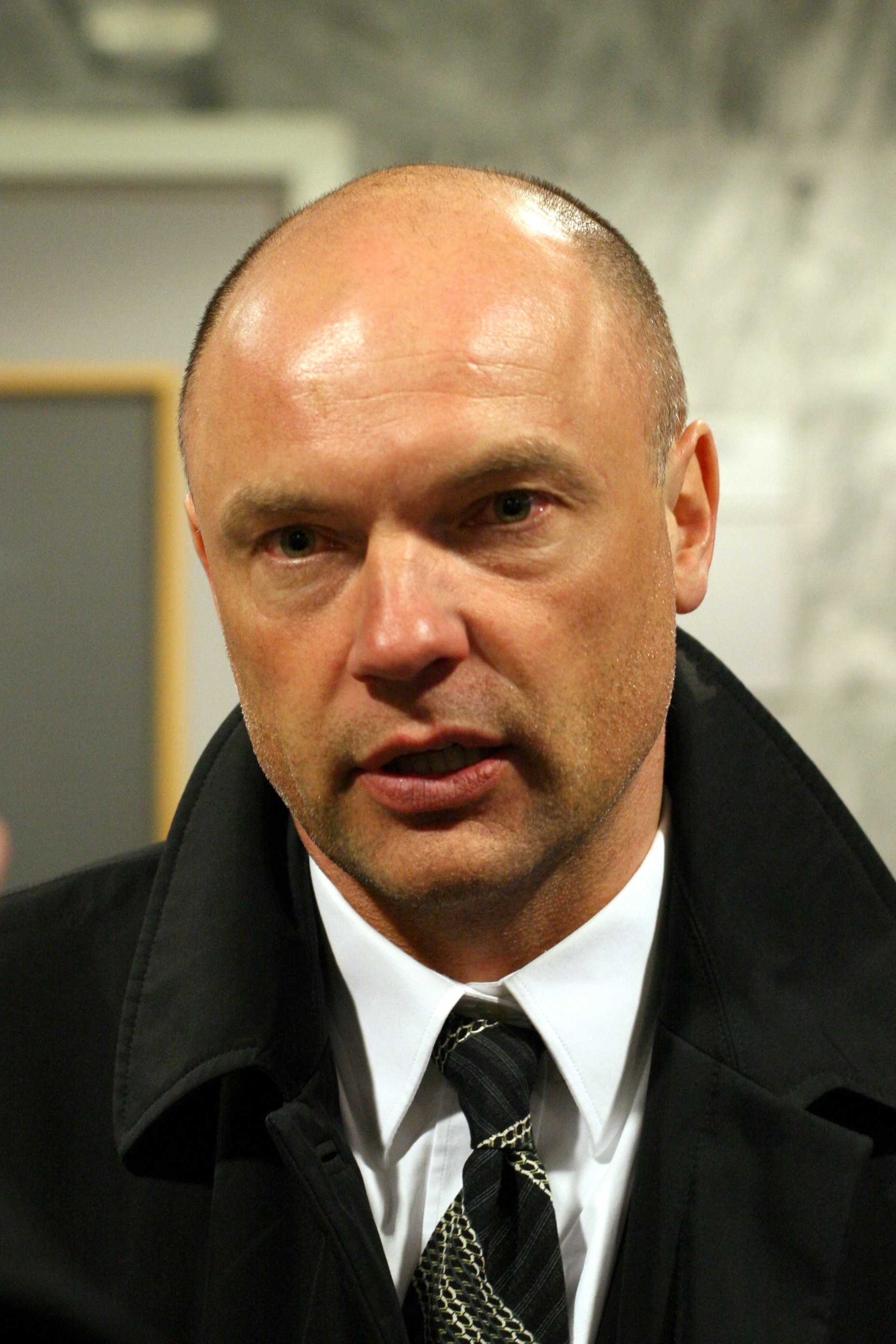
Uwe Rösler was announced as Brentford manager on 10 June 2011.

After guiding Brentford away from the League One relegation zone and securing a mid-table finish at the end of the 2010–11 season, Nicky Forster was passed over for the full-time manager's job in favour of Uwe Rösler. Rösler's appointment was part of an overhaul behind the scenes at Griffin Park, with Forster's first team coach Mark Warburton retained by the club and installed in the newly created role of sporting director. Medical and analysis teams were added to the backroom staff and a Development Squad was introduced to replace the reserve team. Manager Rösler brought in six new players before the beginning of the season – defenders Marcel Eger and Shay Logan, midfielders Jonathan Douglas and Harry Forrester, loan winger Niall McGinn and forward Clayton Donaldson. Two more players would arrive before the end of the summer transfer window, defender Adam Thompson and forward Mike Grella. Grella was a late replacement for Charlie MacDonald, who transferred to Milton Keynes Dons.

Despite falling at the first hurdle to League Two club Hereford United in the first round of the League Cup, Brentford enjoyed a strong start to the league season, winning five of the opening seven matches to climb as high as 4th place. By the end of 2011, the Bees were on the edge of the playoff places and had exited all the cup competitions, having been knocked out of the FA Cup and Football League Trophy at the second round and Southern Area semi-final stages respectively. Manager Uwe Rösler spent much of the first half of the season overhauling the squad, loaning out Pim Balkestein, Ryan Blake, Michael Spillane and Sam Wood, with six loan players arriving between 8 September and 24 November as cover during an injury crisis. Leading goalscorer Gary Alexander was loaned out for the final two months of the season.

Just 3 wins from a 16-match spell between 17 December 2011 and 20 March 2012 dropped Brentford back into mid-table. Though the team finished the season strongly (winning six and drawing two of the final 9 matches), too many dropped points at home saw the Bees finish in 9th place, six points below the playoff zone. The season proved to be one of transition and the loan signings of left back Jake Bidwell, centre back Harlee Dean and midfielder Adam Forshaw proved to be shrewd, with the trio returning for the 2012–13 season (Bidwell on loan, Dean and Forshaw on permanent transfers) and all playing a major part in Brentford's future success. Teenage Development Squad midfielder Jake Reeves was blooded during the season and was described as "a big option" by Rösler.

== League table ==
Pos	Team	Pld	W	D	L	GF	GA	GD	Pts
7	Notts County	46	21	10	15	75	63	+12	73
8	Carlisle United	46	18	15	13	65	66	−1	69
9	Brentford	46	18	13	15	63	52	+11	67
10	Colchester United	46	13	20	13	61	66	−5	59
11	AFC Bournemouth	46	15	13	18	48	52	−4	58

Updated to match(es) played on 5 May 2012. Source: BBC Sport
Rules for classification: 1) Points; 2) Goal difference; 3) Number of goals scored

== Results ==
=== Pre-season friendlies ===
12 July 2011 Practice match	Strømmen IF	0–0	Brentford	Strømmen Stadion
		Report

16 July 2011	Tonbridge Angels	0–10	Brentford	Longmead Stadium
		Report	MacDonald; Alexander; Norris; Spillane

19 July 2011	Hampton & Richmond Borough	1–6	Brentford	Beveree Stadium
19:45	Duff	Report	Eger; Wood; Alexander; Norris pen.' McGinn; Spillane	Attendance: 1,027

22 July 2011	Brentford	1–0	Stoke City	Griffin Park
19:45	MacDonald 72'	Report		Attendance: 2,946

26 July 2011	Brentford	0–0	Watford	Griffin Park
19:45		Report		Attendance: 2,491

30 July 2011	Aldershot Town	1–2	Brentford	Recreation Ground
15:00	Rankine 32' (pen.)	Report	Alexander 38' (pen.); MacDonald 76'	Attendance: 1,147; Referee: Danny McDermid

=== League One ===
==== Results by round ====
Round	1	2	3	4	5	6	7	8	9	10	11	12	13	14	15	16	17	18	19	20	21	22	23	24	25	26	27	28	29	30	31	32	33	34	35	36	37	38	39	40	41	42	43	44	45	46
Ground	H	A	A	H	H	A	A	H	H	A	H	A	H	A	H	H	A	H	A	H	A	H	H	A	A	H	A	H	A	H	A	H	A	A	H	H	A	A	H	A	H	A	H	A	H	A
Result	W	L	W	W	L	W	W	D	L	W	L	D	D	D	L	W	D	L	W	W	D	D	D	D	D	D	L	W	L	W	L	W	D	L	W	L	L	L	W	W	W	D	D	L	L	W
Position	4	9	5	4	7	4	4	5	8	6	9	7	8	10	11	8	9	9	7	6	7	8	7	8	8	9	9	9	10	9	9	9	9	9	9	9	9	9	9	9	9	9	9	9	9	9

Source: Statto
A = Away; H = Home; W = Win; D = Draw; L = Loss

==== Results summary ====
Overall								Home						Away					
Pld	W	D	L	GF	GA	GD	Pts	W	D	L	GF	GA	GD	W	D	L	GF	GA	GD
46	18	13	15	63	52	+11	67	10	6	7	36	24	+12	8	7	8	27	28	−1

Source: Statto

==== Results ====
6 August 2011 1	Brentford	2–0	Yeovil Town	Griffin Park
15:00	Alexander 30' (pen.); Logan 76'	Report		Attendance: 6,278; Referee: Pat Miller

13 August 2011 2	Sheffield United	2–0	Brentford	Bramall Lane
15:00	Slew 49'; Cresswell 70'	Report		Attendance: 17,769; Referee: David Webb

16 August 2011 3	Exeter City	1–2	Brentford	St James Park
19:45	Bauza 66' (pen.)	Report	Dunne 18' (o.g.); Donaldson 37'	Attendance: 4,344

20 August 2011 4	Brentford	5–0	Leyton Orient	Griffin Park
15:00	McGinn 6'; Legge 52'; Saunders 54', 75'; Bean 89'	Report		Attendance: 5,399

27 August 2011 5	Brentford	0–2	Tranmere Rovers	Griffin Park
15:00		Report	Weir 28'; Robinson 46'	Attendance: 5,381

3 September 2011 6	Walsall	0–1	Brentford	Bescot Stadium
15:00	Nicholls (yellow card) 70'	Report	Donaldson 27' Spillane (yellow card) 90+1'	Attendance: 3,972; Referee: Chris Foy

10 September 2011 7	Wycombe Wanderers	0–1	Brentford	Adams Park
15:00		Report	O'Connor 36' (pen.)	Attendance: 5,045; Referee: Stroud

13 September 2011 8	Brentford	1–1	Colchester United	Griffin Park
19:45	Donaldson 56'	Report	Wordsworth 90+1'	Attendance: 4,714; Referee: Ward

17 September 2011 9	Brentford	1–3	Preston North End	Griffin Park
15:00	McGinn 21'	Report	Mellor 10', 73'; Hume 32'	Attendance: 6,090; Referee: D'Urso

24 September 2011 10	Oldham Athletic	0–2	Brentford	Boundary Park
15:00		Report	Douglas 38'; Weston 73'	Attendance: 3,777; Referee: Geoff Eltringham

1 October 2011 11	Brentford	0–4	Huddersfield Town	Griffin Park
15:00		Report	Rhodes 36', 76'; Novak 70'; Roberts 78'	Attendance: 6,101; Referee: Graham

8 October 2011 12	Carlisle United	2–2	Brentford	Brunton Park
15:00	Berrett 23'; Clarkson 63' (o.g.)	Report	Clarkson 9'; Diagouraga 88'	Attendance: 4,184; Referee: Lewis

15 October 2011 13	Brentford	0–0	Scunthorpe United	Griffin Park
15:00		Report		Attendance: 4,907; Referee: East

22 October 2011 14	Notts County	1–1	Brentford	Meadow Lane
15:00	J Hughes 38' (pen.)	Report	Donaldson 46'	Attendance: 6,735; Referee: Mark Haywood

25 October 2011 15	Brentford	0–1	Stevenage	Griffin Park
19:45		Report	Beardsley 73'	Attendance: 4,771; Referee: Simon Hooper

29 October 2011 16	Brentford	2–1	Chesterfield	Griffin Park
15:00	Saunders 24'; Bennett 82'	Report	Clarke 27'	Attendance: 4,566; Referee: Ian Williamson

5 November 2011 17	Sheffield Wednesday	0–0	Brentford	Hillsborough Stadium
15:00		Report		Attendance: 18,107; Referee: D'Urso

19 November 2011 18	Brentford	0–1	Charlton Athletic	Griffin Park
15:00		Report	Wright-Phillips 64'	Attendance: 8,095; Referee: Ilderton

26 November 2011 19	Rochdale	1–2	Brentford	Spotland Stadium
15:00	Holness 65'	Report	Alexander 11' (pen.); Saunders 78'	Attendance: 2,466; Referee: Sutton

10 December 2011 20	Brentford	2–1	Hartlepool United	Griffin Park
15:00	McGinn 80'; Alexander 85'	Report	Collins 83'	Attendance: 6,352; Referee: Carl Berry

17 December 2011 21	Bury	1–1	Brentford	Gigg Lane
15:00	John-Lewis 85'	Report	Alexander 61' (pen.)	Attendance: 4,008; Referee: Carl Boyeson

26 December 2011 22	Brentford	1–1	Bournemouth	Griffin Park
15:00	Legge 90+4'	Report	Sheringham 19'	Attendance: 6,338; Referee: Dean Whitestone

31 December 2011 23	Brentford	3–3	Milton Keynes Dons	Griffin Park
15:00	Alexander 65' (75), pen.' Legge 90+2'	Report	Potter 4'; Balanta 6'; MacDonald 41'	Attendance: 5,397; Referee: Gavin Ward

2 January 2012 24	Charlton Athletic	2–0	Brentford	The Valley
15:15	Morrison 31'; Green 90'	Report		Attendance: 17,506; Referee: Graham Scott

7 January 2012 25	Tranmere Rovers	2–2	Brentford	Prenton Park
15:00	Devaney 4'; Dean 55' (o.g.)	Report	Alexander 22'; Donaldson 32'	Attendance: 4,432; Referee: Dean Mohareb

14 January 2012 26	Brentford	0–0	Walsall	Griffin Park
15:00		Report		Attendance: 4,867; Referee: Mark Brown

21 January 2012 27	Huddersfield Town	3–2	Brentford	Kirklees Stadium
17:20	Lee 41'; McCombe 45+2'; Rhodes 50'	Report	Alexander 21', pen.', 29'	Attendance: 14,405; Referee: C Webster

28 January 2012 28	Brentford	5–2	Wycombe Wanderers	Griffin Park
15:00	Alexander 10', 29', 81'; Saunders 22'; Diagouraga 73'	Report	Winfield 47'; Strevens 76'	Attendance: 5,560; Referee: Mark Heywood

14 February 2012 29	Colchester United	2–1	Brentford	Colchester Community Stadium
19:45	Gillespie 83', 85'	Report	McGinn 57'	Attendance: 2,923; Referee: James Linington

20 February 2012 30	Brentford	4–0	Carlisle United	Griffin Park
19:45	Dean 28'; Saunders 32'; Berahino 41', 53'	Report		Attendance: 4,292; Referee: Anthony Bates

25 February 2012 31	Scunthorpe United	0–0	Brentford	Glanford Park
15:00	Reid (yellow card) 16'	Report	Bean (yellow card) 39'; Legge (yellow card) 90+2'	Attendance: 3,844; Referee: Steve Rushton

3 March 2012 32	Yeovil Town	2–1	Brentford	Huish Park
15:00	Upson (yellow card) 42'; Williams 49' 87'	Report	Saunders 25'; Douglas (yellow card) 76'	Attendance: 3,930; Referee: Roger East

6 March 2012 33	Brentford	2–0	Exeter City	Griffin Park
19:45	Saido Berahino 41' 69'	Report	Logan (yellow card) 38'; O'Brien (yellow card) 40'; Noble (red card) 67'	Attendance: 4,124; Referee: Darren Deadman

10 March 2012 34	Brentford	0–2	Sheffield United	Griffin Park
15:00	Diagouraga (yellow card) 22'	Report	Evans 6' 51'; Maguire (yellow card) 61'; Cresswell (yellow card) 90+1'	Attendance: 7,414; Referee: Chris Sarginson

17 March 2012 35	Leyton Orient	2–0	Brentford	Brisbane Road
15:00	Lisbie 29'; Smith 45'; Forbes (yellow card) 83'	Report	Logan (yellow card) 40'; Donaldson (yellow card) 64'	Attendance: 4,173; Referee: Paul Tierney

20 March 2012 36	Bournemouth	1–0	Brentford	Dean Court
19:45	Fogden 45'; Francis (yellow card) 49'	Report	Thompson (yellow card) 44'	Attendance: 4,563; Referee: Dean Mohareb

24 March 2012 37	Brentford	2–0	Rochdale	Griffin Park
15:00	Diagouraga 32'; Donaldson 85'	Report	Jordan (yellow card) 33'	Attendance: 4,919; Referee: Brendan Malone

27 March 2012 38	Preston North End	1–3	Brentford	Deepdale
19:45	Procter (yellow card) 26'; Parry 42' (pen.); Robertson (yellow card) 45+1'; Coutts (yellow card) 65'	Report	Logan 9'; Donaldson 22' (pen.) 53'; Forrester (yellow card) 44'; Bidwell (yellow card) 81'	Attendance: 9,148; Referee: James Adcock

31 March 2012 39	Milton Keynes Dons	1–2	Brentford	Stadium mk
15:00	Smith (yellow card) 34'; Flanagan (yellow card) 59'; MacDonald (yellow card) 61'; Lewington (yellow card) 81'; Williams 88' (pen.)	Report	Donaldson 12'; Douglas 26'; Thompson (yellow card) 75'; Bean (yellow card) 81'; Diagouraga (yellow card) 86'; Osborne (yellow card) 89'	Attendance: 11,570; Referee: Gary Sutton

3 April 2012 40	Brentford	2–0	Oldham Athletic	Griffin Park
19:45	Bean 2'; McGinn 67'; Dean (yellow card) 85'	Report	Simpson (yellow card) 28'; Filipe Morais (yellow card) 45+2'; Furman (yellow card) 90+2'	Attendance: 4,593; Referee: Nigel Miller

7 April 2012 41	Brentford	3–0	Bury	Griffin Park
15:00	Saunders 44' 63'; Logan (yellow card) 60' (goal) 68'	Report	Schmacher (yellow card) 51'; Jones (yellow card) 70'; Clarke (yellow card) 80'	Attendance: 5,192; Referee: Simon Hooper

9 April 2012 42	Hartlepool United	0–0	Brentford	Victoria Park, Hartlepool
15:00	Austin (yellow card) 83'	Report	Douglas (yellow card) 42'; Saunders (yellow card) 51'; Morrison (yellow card) 81'	Attendance: 4,292; Referee: Rob Lewis

14 April 2012 43	Brentford	0–0	Notts County	Griffin Park
15:00	Bidwell (yellow card) 73'; Logan (yellow card) 77'	Report	Hughes (yellow card) 29'; Chilvers (yellow card) 38'; Stewart (yellow card) 86'	Attendance: 7,079; Referee: Lee Collins

21 April 2012 44	Stevenage	2–1	Brentford	Broadhall Way
15:00	Lascelles (yellow card) 33'; Reid 52'; Freeman 61' (yellow card) 89'	Report	Douglas (yellow card) 72'; Saunders (yellow card) 82' (goal) 90+1'; Bidwell (yellow card) 90+1'	Attendance: 4,256; Referee: Carl Berry

28 April 2012 45	Brentford	1–2	Sheffield Wednesday	Griffin Park
15:00	Douglas (yellow card) 33'; Donaldson 62' (pen.)	Report	Beevers (yellow card) 27'; Treacy 38'; Miguel Llera (yellow card) 58' (goal) 66'; Buxton (yellow card) 90+3'	Attendance: 7,381; Referee: Chris Sarginson

5 May 2012 46	Chesterfield	2–3	Brentford	B2net Stadium
15:00	Moussa 69'; Darikwa (yellow card) 76'; Allott 90+3'	Report	Legge 12'; Diagouraga 59'; Donaldson 80'	Attendance: 5,699; Referee: Danny McDermid

=== FA Cup ===
12 November 2011 1st Round	Brentford	1–0	Basingstoke Town	Griffin Park
13:00	Saunders 9'	Report		Attendance: 3,553; Referee: Masaaki Toma

3 December 2011 2nd Round	Brentford	0–1	Wrexham	Griffin Park
15:00		Report	Tolley 33'	Attendance: 3,452; Referee: Roger East

=== Football League Cup ===
9 August 2011 1st Round	Hereford United	1–0	Brentford	Edgar Street
19:45	Arquin 90+2'	Report		Attendance: 1,767; Referee: Phil Gibbs

=== Football League Trophy ===
30 August 2011 Round 1	Milton Keynes Dons	3–3 (3–4 p)	Brentford	Stadium:mk
19:45	MacDonald 19'; Chadwick 30'; Douglas 86' (o.g.)	Report	Thompson 27'; Alexander 56', 82'	Attendance: 4,175; Referee: L. Collins
	Penalties
	Smith (penalty scored); Lewington (penalty scored); Potter (penalty missed); Bowditch (penalty scored); Gleeson (penalty missed)		(penalty scored) Alexander; (penalty scored) Douglas; (penalty scored) Reeves; (penalty scored) Grella

5 October 2011 Round 2	Charlton Athletic	0–3	Brentford	The Valley
19:45		Report	Adams 2'; O'Connor 24' (pen.); Diagouraga 61'	Attendance: 3,486; Referee: James Linington

8 November 2011 Southern QF	Brentford	6–0	Bournemouth	Griffin Park
19:45	Saunders 5'; Grella 23', 48', 82', 84'; Logan 77'	Report		Attendance: 3,015; Referee: Andy Woolmer

6 December 2011 Southern SF	Barnet	0–0 (5–3 p)	Brentford	Underhill Stadium
19:45		Report		Attendance: 1,970; Referee: Oliver Langford
	Penalties
	Hughes (penalty scored); Holmes (penalty scored); Deering (penalty scored); McLeod (penalty scored); Senda (penalty scored)		(penalty scored) Alexander; (penalty missed) Douglas; (penalty scored) Reeves; (penalty scored) Sam Saunders

- Sources: Statto, brentfordfc.co.uk, brentfordfc.co.uk

== Playing squad ==
Players' ages are as of the opening day of the 2011–12 season.

No	Position	Name	Nationality	Date of birth (age)	Signed from	Signed in	Notes
Goalkeepers
1	GK	Richard Lee	(England)	5 October 1982 (aged 28)	Watford	2010	
21	GK	Antoine Gounet	(France)	16 October 1988 (aged 22)	Unattached	2012	
31	GK	Simon Moore	(England)	19 May 1990 (aged 21)	Farnborough	2009	
Defenders
3	DF	Craig Woodman	(England)	22 December 1982 (aged 28)	Wycombe Wanderers	2010	
5	DF	Marcel Eger	(Germany)	23 March 1983 (aged 28)	St. Pauli	2011	
6	DF	Pim Balkestein	(Netherlands)	29 April 1987 (aged 24)	Ipswich Town	2010	Loaned to Rochdale and AFC Wimbledon
14	DF	Shay Logan	(England)	29 January 1988 (aged 23)	Manchester City	2011	
17	DF	Ryan Blake	(Northern Ireland)	8 December 1991 (aged 18)	Youth	2009	Loaned to Farnborough and Hampton & Richmond Borough
22	DF	Karleigh Osborne	(England)	19 March 1988 (aged 23)	Youth	2004	
23	DF	Adam Thompson	(Northern Ireland)	28 September 1992 (aged 18)	Watford	2012	On loan from Watford
24	DF	Jake Bidwell	(England)	21 March 1993 (aged 18)	Everton	2011	On loan from Everton
25	DF	Harlee Dean	(England)	26 July 1991 (aged 20)	Southampton	2011	On loan from Southampton
30	DF	Alfie Mawson	(England)	19 January 1994 (aged 17)	Youth	2011	
32	DF	Leon Legge	(England)	1 July 1985 (aged 26)	Tonbridge Angels	2009	
Midfielders
2	MF	Kevin O'Connor (c)	(Republic of Ireland)	24 February 1982 (aged 29)	Youth	2000	
4	MF	Marcus Bean	(Jamaica)	2 November 1984 (aged 26)	Blackpool	2008	
7	MF	Sam Saunders	(England)	29 August 1983 (aged 27)	Dagenham & Redbridge	2009	
8	MF	Jonathan Douglas	(Republic of Ireland)	22 November 1981 (aged 29)	Swindon Town	2011	
11	MF	Myles Weston	(Antigua and Barbuda)	12 March 1988 (aged 23)	Notts County	2009	
16	MF	Sam Wood	(England)	9 August 1986 (aged 24)	Bromley	2008	Loaned to Rotherham United
18	MF	Niall McGinn	(Northern Ireland)	20 July 1987 (aged 24)	Celtic	2011	On loan from Celtic
19	MF	Harry Forrester	(England)	2 January 1991 (aged 20)	Aston Villa	2011	
20	MF	Toumani Diagouraga	(France)	20 June 1987 (aged 24)	Peterborough United	2010	
27	MF	Manny Oyeleke	(England)	24 December 1992 (aged 18)	Youth	2011	
40	MF	Jake Reeves	(England)	30 May 1993 (aged 18)	Youth	2011	
Forwards
9	FW	Clayton Donaldson	(Jamaica)	7 February 1984 (aged 27)	Crewe Alexandra	2011	
17	FW	Clinton Morrison	(Republic of Ireland)	14 May 1979 (aged 32)	Sheffield Wednesday	2012	On loan from Sheffield Wednesday
28	FW	Antonio German	(Grenada)	2 January 1991 (aged 20)	Bromley	2012	
29	FW	Gary Alexander	(England)	15 August 1979 (aged 31)	Millwall	2010	Loaned to Crawley Town
33	FW	Luke Norris	(England)	30 June 1993 (aged 18)	Youth	2011	
Players who left the club mid-season
10	FW	Saido Berahino	(Burundi)	4 August 1993 (aged 18)	West Bromwich Albion	2012	Returned to West Bromwich Albion after loan
~~10~~	FW	Mike Grella	(United States)	23 January 1987 (aged 24)	Leeds United	2011	Loaned from Leeds United before transferring permanently Released
~~10~~	FW	Charlie MacDonald	(England)	13 February 1981 (aged 30)	Southend United	2008	Transferred to Milton Keynes Dons
12	MF	Adam Forshaw	(England)	8 October 1991 (aged 19)	Everton	2012	Returned to Everton after loan
~~12~~	DF	Michael Spillane	(Republic of Ireland)	23 March 1989 (aged 22)	Norwich City	2010	Loaned to Dagenham & Redbridge; Transferred to Dagenham & Redbridge
~~17~~	FW	Kirk Hudson	(England)	12 December 1986 (aged 24)	Aldershot Town	2010	Released
~~21~~	GK	Conor Devlin	(Northern Ireland)	23 September 1991 (aged 19)	Unattached	2011	Released
~~21~~	GK	Simon Royce	(England)	9 September 1971 (aged 39)	Gillingham	2010	Retired
~~23~~	GK	Dale Bennett	(England)	6 January 1990 (aged 21)	Watford	2012	Returned to Watford after loan
~~24~~	DF	Blair Adams	(England)	8 September 1991 (aged 19)	Sunderland	2011	Returned to Sunderland after loan
~~25~~	DF	Miguel Llera	(Spain)	7 August 1979 (aged 31)	Blackpool	2011	Returned to Blackpool after loan
~~26~~	FW	David Clarkson	(Scotland)	10 September 1985 (aged 25)	Bristol City	2011	Returned to Bristol City after loan
26	FW	Piero Mingoia	(England)	20 October 1991 (aged 19)	Watford	2011	Returned to Watford after loan

- Source: Soccerbase

== Coaching staff ==
Name	Role
(Germany) Uwe Rösler	Manager
(Republic of Ireland) Alan Kernaghan	Assistant Manager
(England) Peter Farrell	First team Coach
(England) Simon Royce	Goalkeeping Coach
(England) Ben Wood	Physiotherapist
(England) Chris Haslam	Head of Conditioning
(England) Darren Glenister	Sports Therapist
(England) Chris Domoney	Masseur
(England) Bob Oteng	Kit Man

== Statistics ==
=== Appearances and goals ===
Substitute appearances in brackets.

No	Pos	Nat	Name	League		FA Cup		League Cup		FL Trophy		Total	
No	Pos	Nat	Name	Apps	Goals	Apps	Goals	Apps	Goals	Apps	Goals	Apps	Goals
1	GK	(England)	Richard Lee	37	0	2	0	0	0	3	0	42	0
2	MF	(Republic of Ireland)	Kevin O'Connor	9 (5)	1	1	0	1	0	2	1	13 (5)	2
3	DF	(England)	Craig Woodman	18	0	1	0	0	0	3	0	22	0
4	MF	(Jamaica)	Marcus Bean	22 (10)	2	0 (1)	0	1	0	3	0	26 (11)	2
5	DF	(Germany)	Marcel Eger	13 (3)	0	1	0	1	0	4	0	19 (3)	0
6	DF	(Netherlands)	Pim Balkestein	2 (3)	0	—		0	0	—		2 (3)	0
7	MF	(England)	Sam Saunders	29 (8)	10	2	1	1	0	2 (1)	1	34 (9)	12
8	MF	(Republic of Ireland)	Jonathan Douglas	46	2	1	0	1	0	3	0	51	2
9	FW	(Jamaica)	Clayton Donaldson	40 (6)	11	0 (2)	0	1	0	2	0	43 (8)	11
~~10~~	FW	(United States)	Mike Grella	1 (10)	0	2	0	—		1 (3)	4	4 (13)	4
~~10~~	FW	(England)	Charlie MacDonald	0 (3)	0	—		1	0	—		1 (3)	0
11	MF	(Antigua and Barbuda)	Myles Weston	11 (15)	1	1	0	0 (1)	0	3	0	15 (16)	1
~~12~~	DF	(Republic of Ireland)	Michael Spillane	0 (1)	0	0	0	0	0	0	0	0 (1)	0
14	DF	(England)	Shay Logan	26 (1)	3	2	0	1	0	2	1	31 (1)	4
16	MF	(England)	Sam Wood	3 (2)	0	0	0	1	0	0 (2)	0	4 (4)	0
19	MF	(England)	Harry Forrester	7 (12)	0	0	0	0	0	1	0	8 (12)	0
20	MF	(France)	Toumani Diagouraga	30 (5)	4	2	0	0	0	3	1	35 (5)	3
22	DF	(England)	Karleigh Osborne	22 (3)	0	0	0	1	0	1	0	24 (3)	0
27	MF	(England)	Manny Oyeleke	1	0	0 (1)	0	0	0	0	0	1 (1)	0
28	FW	(Grenada)	Antonio German	0 (2)	0	—		—		—		0 (2)	0
29	FW	(England)	Gary Alexander	20 (4)	12	2	0	0 (1)	0	1 (2)	2	23 (7)	14
31	GK	(England)	Simon Moore	9 (1)	0	0	0	1	0	1	0	11 (1)	0
32	DF	(England)	Leon Legge	23 (5)	4	1 (1)	0	0	0	0 (1)	0	24 (7)	4
33	FW	(England)	Luke Norris	0 (1)	0	0	0	0	0	0	0	0 (1)	0
40	MF	(England)	Jake Reeves	7 (1)	0	0	0	0 (1)	0	0 (2)	0	7 (4)	0
Players loaned in during the season
10	FW	(Burundi)	Saido Berahino	5 (3)	4	—		—		—		5 (3)	4
12	MF	(England)	Adam Forshaw	6 (1)	0	—		—		—		6 (1)	0
17	FW	(Republic of Ireland)	Clinton Morrison	4 (4)	0	—		—		—		4 (4)	0
18	MF	(Northern Ireland)	Niall McGinn	27 (10)	5	1 (1)	0	0	0	1 (1)	0	29 (12)	5
~~23~~	DF	(England)	Dale Bennett	5	1	0	0	—		0	0	5	1
23	DF	(Northern Ireland)	Adam Thompson	16 (4)	0	—		—		2	1	18 (4)	1
~~24~~	DF	(England)	Blair Adams	6 (1)	0	1	0	—		0 (1)	1	7 (2)	1
24	DF	(England)	Jake Bidwell	24	0	—		—		1	0	25	0
25	DF	(England)	Harlee Dean	23 (3)	1	1	0	—		1	0	25 (3)	1
~~25~~	DF	(Spain)	Miguel Llera	10 (1)	0	1	0	—		2	0	13 (1)	0
~~26~~	FW	(Scotland)	David Clarkson	4	1	—		—		1	0	5	1

- Players listed in italics left the club mid-season.
- Source: Soccerbase

=== Goalscorers ===
No	Pos	Nat	Player	FL1	FAC	FLC	FLT	Total
29	FW	(England)	Gary Alexander	12	0	0	2	14
7	MF	(England)	Sam Saunders	10	1	0	1	12
9	FW	(Jamaica)	Clayton Donaldson	11	0	0	0	11
18	MF	(Northern Ireland)	Niall McGinn	5	0	0	0	5
10	FW	(Burundi)	Saido Berahino	4	—	—	—	4
32	DF	(England)	Leon Legge	4	0	0	0	4
14	DF	(England)	Shay Logan	3	0	0	1	4
~~10~~	FW	(United States)	Mike Grella	0	0	—	4	4
20	MF	(France)	Toumani Diagouraga	2	0	0	1	3
4	MF	(Jamaica)	Marcus Bean	2	0	0	0	2
8	MF	(Republic of Ireland)	Jonathan Douglas	2	0	0	0	2
2	MF	(Republic of Ireland)	Kevin O'Connor	1	0	0	1	2
~~23~~	DF	(England)	Dale Bennett	1	0	—	0	1
~~26~~	FW	(Scotland)	David Clarkson	1	—	—	0	1
25	DF	(England)	Harlee Dean	1	0	—	0	1
11	MF	(Antigua and Barbuda)	Myles Weston	1	0	0	0	1
23	DF	(Northern Ireland)	Adam Thompson	0	—	—	1	1
~~24~~	DF	(England)	Blair Adams	0	0	—	1	1
Total				63	1	0	9	72

- Players listed in italics left the club mid-season.
- Source: Soccerbase

=== Discipline ===
No	Pos	Nat	Player	FL1		FAC		FLC		FLT		Total		Pts
No	Pos	Nat	Player	Booked	Sent off (straight red)	Booked	Sent off (straight red)	Booked	Sent off (straight red)	Booked	Sent off (straight red)	Booked	Sent off (straight red)	Pts
8	MF	(Republic of Ireland)	Jonathan Douglas	8	0	0	0	1	0	2	0	11	0	11
4	MF	(Jamaica)	Marcus Bean	5	0	1	0	0	0	1	0	7	0	7
20	MF	(France)	Toumani Diagouraga	5	0	0	0	0	0	1	0	6	0	6
5	DF	(Germany)	Marcel Eger	5	0	0	0	0	0	0	0	5	0	5
7	MF	(England)	Sam Saunders	4	0	1	0	0	0	0	0	5	0	5
~~25~~	DF	(Spain)	Miguel Llera	1	1	0	0	—		1	0	2	1	5
23	DF	(Northern Ireland)	Adam Thompson	4	0	—		—		0	0	4	0	4
24	DF	(England)	Jake Bidwell	4	0	—		—		0	0	4	0	4
14	DF	(England)	Shay Logan	4	0	0	0	0	0	0	0	4	0	4
25	DF	(England)	Harlee Dean	3	0	0	0	—		0	0	3	0	3
29	FW	(England)	Gary Alexander	3	0	0	0	0	0	0	0	3	0	3
32	DF	(England)	Leon Legge	3	0	0	0	0	0	0	0	3	0	3
22	DF	(England)	Karleigh Osborne	3	0	0	0	0	0	0	0	3	0	3
9	FW	(Jamaica)	Clayton Donaldson	2	0	0	0	0	0	0	0	2	0	2
~~10~~	FW	(United States)	Mike Grella	1	0	0	0	—		1	0	2	0	2
17	FW	(Republic of Ireland)	Clinton Morrison	1	0	—		—		—		1	0	1
19	MF	(England)	Harry Forrester	1	0	0	0	0	0	0	0	1	0	1
1	GK	(England)	Richard Lee	1	0	0	0	0	0	0	0	1	0	1
2	MF	(Republic of Ireland)	Kevin O'Connor	1	0	0	0	0	0	0	0	1	0	1
~~12~~	DF	(Republic of Ireland)	Michael Spillane	1	0	0	0	0	0	0	0	1	0	1
11	MF	(Antigua and Barbuda)	Myles Weston	1	0	0	0	0	0	0	0	1	0	1
3	DF	(England)	Craig Woodman	1	0	0	0	0	0	0	0	1	0	1
Total				62	1	2	0	1	0	6	0	71	1	74

- Players listed in italics left the club mid-season.
- Source: ESPN FC

=== International caps ===
No	Pos	Nat	Player	Caps	Goals	Ref
4	MF	(Jamaica)	Marcus Bean	1	0	

=== Management ===
Name	Nat	From	To	Record All Comps					Record League				
Name	Nat	From	To	P	W	D	L	W %	P	W	D	L	W %
Uwe Rösler	(Germany)	6 August 2011	5 May 2012	53	21	15	17	39.62|	46	18	13	15	39.13

=== Summary ===
Games played	53 (46 League One, 2 FA Cup, 4 League Cup, 7 Football League Trophy)
Games won	21 (18 League One, 1 FA Cup, 0 League Cup, 2 Football League Trophy)
Games drawn	15 (13 League One, 0 FA Cup, 0 League Cup, 2 Football League Trophy)
Games lost	17 (15 League One, 1 FA Cup, 1 League Cup, 0 Football League Trophy)
Goals scored	76 (63 League One, 1 FA Cup, 0 League Cup, 12 Football League Trophy)
Goals conceded	57 (52 League One, 1 FA Cup, 1 League Cup, 3 Football League Trophy)
Clean sheets	20 (16 League One, 1 FA Cup, 0 League Cup, 3 Football League Trophy)
Biggest league win	5–0 versus Leyton Orient, 20 August 2011
Worst league defeat	4–0 versus Huddersfield Town, 1 October 2011
Most appearances	51, Clayton Donaldson (46 League One, 2 FA Cup, 1 League Cup, 2 Football League Trophy), Jonathan Douglas (46 League One, 1 FA Cup, 1 League Cup, 3 Football League Trophy)
Top scorer (league)	12, Gary Alexander
Top scorer (all competitions)	14, Gary Alexander

== Transfers & loans ==
Players transferred in
Date	Pos.	Name	Previous club	Fee	Ref.
1 July 2011	MF	(England) Liam Bellamy	(England) Charlton Athletic	Free	
1 July 2011	FW	(Jamaica) Clayton Donaldson	(England) Crewe Alexandra	Free	
1 July 2011	MF	(Republic of Ireland) Jonathan Douglas	(England) Swindon Town	Free	
1 July 2011	DF	(Germany) Marcel Eger	(Germany) St. Pauli	Free	
1 July 2011	DF	(England) Sam Griffiths	(England) Wolverhampton Wanderers	Free	
1 July 2011	DF	(England) Michael Kamau	(England) Fulham	Free	
1 July 2011	DF	(England) Shay Logan	(England) Manchester City	Free	
1 July 2011	DF	(Grenada) Aaron Pierre	(England) Fulham	Free	
4 August 2011	MF	(England) Harry Forrester	(England) Aston Villa	Free	
26 August 2011	FW	(United States) Mike Grella	(England) Leeds United	Free	
29 September 2011	MF	(England) Josh Ekim	Unattached	Free	
3 November 2011	GK	(Northern Ireland) Conor Devlin	Unattached	Free	
8 January 2012	MF	(Northern Ireland) Jack Warburton	(England) Leicester City	Free	
26 January 2012	FW	(Grenada) Antonio German	(England) Bromley	Free	
28 January 2012	GK	(France) Antoine Gounet	Unattached	Free	
Players loaned in
Date from	Pos.	Name	From	Date to	Ref.
12 July 2011	MF	(Northern Ireland) Niall McGinn	(Scotland) Celtic	End of season	
25 August 2011	DF	(Northern Ireland) Adam Thompson	(England) Watford	25 October 2011	
26 August 2011	FW	(United States) Mike Grella	(England) Leeds United	31 August 2011	
8 September 2011	DF	(England) Blair Adams	(England) Sunderland	24 November 2011	
8 September 2011	DF	(Spain) Miguel Llera	(England) Blackpool	22 November 2011	
16 September 2011	FW	(Scotland) David Clarkson	(England) Bristol City	16 October 2011	
27 October 2011	DF	(England) Dale Bennett	(England) Watford	28 November 2011	
24 November 2011	DF	(England) Jake Bidwell	(England) Everton	End of season	
24 November 2011	DF	(England) Harlee Dean	(England) Southampton	End of season	
1 January 2012	DF	(England) Dale Bennett	(England) Watford	1 February 2012	
5 January 2012	MF	(England) Piero Mingoia	(England) Watford	23 January 2012	
9 February 2012	FW	(Burundi) Saido Berahino	(England) West Bromwich Albion	3 April 2012	
9 February 2012	DF	(Northern Ireland) Adam Thompson	(England) Watford	End of season	
22 February 2012	MF	(England) Adam Forshaw	(England) Everton	April 2012	
22 March 2012	FW	(Republic of Ireland) Clinton Morrison	(England) Sheffield Wednesday	End of season	
Players transferred out
Date	Pos.	Name	Subsequent club	Fee	Ref.
26 August 2011	FW	(England) Charlie MacDonald	(England) Milton Keynes Dons	£35,000	
Players loaned out
Date from	Pos.	Name	To	Date to	Ref.
19 August 2011	DF	(Netherlands) Pim Balkestein	(England) Rochdale	1 January 2012	
28 October 2011	DF	(Northern Ireland) Ryan Blake	(England) Farnborough	2 December 2011	
17 November 2011	DF	(Republic of Ireland) Michael Spillane	(England) Dagenham & Redbridge	6 January 2012	
24 November 2011	MF	(England) Sam Wood	(England) Rotherham United	3 May 2012	
19 January 2012	DF	(Northern Ireland) Ryan Blake	(England) Hampton & Richmond Borough	27 February 2012	
9 March 2012	FW	(England) Gary Alexander	(England) Crawley Town	End of season	
9 March 2012	DF	(Netherlands) Pim Balkestein	(England) AFC Wimbledon	9 April 2012	
12 March 2012	MF	(England) Liam Bellamy	(England) Ebbsfleet United	End of season	
13 March 2012	GK	(England) Tom Warren	(England) Dover Athletic	End of season	
Players released
Date	Pos.	Name	Subsequent club	Join date	Ref.
18 August 2011	FW	(England) Nicky Forster	(England) Lingfield	August 2011	
5 December 2011	GK	(Northern Ireland) Conor Devlin	(Republic of Ireland) Cliftonville	May 2012	
5 January 2012	DF	(Republic of Ireland) Michael Spillane	(England) Dagenham & Redbridge	6 January 2012	
31 January 2012	FW	(United States) Mike Grella	(England) Bury	27 February 2012	
12 March 2012	FW	(England) Kirk Hudson	(England) Canvey Island	21 August 2012	
18 May 2012	DF	(Germany) Marcel Eger	Retired		
30 June 2012	FW	(England) Gary Alexander	(England) Crawley Town	1 July 2012	
30 June 2012	MF	(Jamaica) Marcus Bean	(England) Colchester United	1 July 2012	
30 June 2012	MF	(England) Liam Bellamy	(England) Ebbsfleet United	1 July 2012	
30 June 2012	DF	(Northern Ireland) Ryan Blake	(England) Ebbsfleet United	1 August 2012	
30 June 2012	MF	(England) Josh Ekim	(England) Hayes & Yeading	15 August 2012	
30 June 2012	DF	(England) Karleigh Osborne	(England) Millwall	13 July 2012	
30 June 2012	MF	(England) Sam Wood	(England) Wycombe Wanderers	3 July 2012	

== Kit ==
Supplier: Puma
Sponsor(s): Hertings (home), Bathwise (away)

Home	Away

Source: brentfordfc.co.uk, brentfordfc.co.uk

== Development Squad ==
=== Playing squad ===
Players' ages are as of the opening day of the 2011–12 senior season.

#	Position	Name	Nationality	Date of birth (age)	Signed from	Signed in	Notes
Defenders
17	DF	Ryan Blake	(Northern Ireland)	8 December 1991 (aged 19)	Youth	2009	Loaned to Farnborough and Hampton & Richmond Borough
—	DF	Sam Griffiths	(England)	2 November 1992 (aged 18)	Wolverhampton Wanderers	2011	
—	DF	Michael Kamau	(England)	22 January 1993 (aged 18)	Fulham	2011	
—	DF	Aaron Pierre	(Grenada)	17 February 1993 (aged 18)	Fulham	2011	
Midfielders
—	MF	Liam Bellamy	(England)	16 October 1991 (aged 19)	Charlton Athletic	2011	Loaned to Ebbsfleet United
—	MF	Josh Ekim	(England)	17 January 1991 (aged 20)	Unattached	2011	
40	MF	Jake Reeves	(England)	30 May 1993 (aged 18)	Youth	2011	
—	MF	Jack Warburton	(Northern Ireland)	27 April 1993 (aged 18)	Leicester City	2012	
Forwards
28	FW	Antonio German	(Grenada)	2 January 1991 (aged 20)	Unattached	2012	

- Source: brentfordfc.co.uk

=== Summary ===
Games played	18
Games won	3
Games drawn	5
Games lost	10
Goals scored	30
Goals conceded	42
Clean sheets	1
Biggest win	7–0 versus Nike Academy, 22 February 2012
Worst league defeat	3–0 on two occasions; 4–1 versus Northwood, 30 July 2011
Most appearances	18, Aaron Pierre
Top scorer	4, Antonio German, Luke Norris, Manny Oyeleke, Sam Wood

- Source: brentfordfc.co.uk

== Awards ==
- Supporters' Player of the Year: Jonathan Douglas
- Community Player of the Year: Marcus Bean
- Football League Family Excellence Award
