= Richard Lee (footballer) =

English footballer (born 1982)

Personal information
- Full name: Richard Anthony Lee
- Date of birth: 5 October 1982 (age 44)
- Place of birth: Oxford, England
- Height: 1.83 m (6 ft 0 in)
- Position: Goalkeeper

Youth career
- 1989–1994: Bedgrove Dynamos
- 1994–2002: Watford

Senior career*
Years	Team	Apps	(Gls)
2002–2010	Watford	92	(0)
2005–2006	→ Blackburn Rovers (loan)	0	(0)
2010–2015	Brentford	66	(0)
2015	→ Fulham (loan)	0	(0)
2015	Hampton & Richmond Borough	0	(0)
2017	Dunstable Town	1	(0)
Total		159	(0)

International career
- England U18
2002–2003	England U20	2	(0)
- * Club domestic league appearances and goals

Richard Anthony Lee (born 5 October 1982) is an English retired professional footballer who played as a goalkeeper. He played in the Premier League and Football League with Watford and Brentford. He was capped by England at U18 and U20 level.

== Club career ==
=== Watford ===
==== 2002–2004 ====
Born in Oxford, Lee joined the academy at Watford at the age of 11 from Bedgrove Dynamos and progressed through the ranks to become a reserve team regular during the 2001–02 season, learning from player-goalkeeping coach Kevin Hitchcock. Lee received his maiden first team call up for a First Division match versus Barnsley on 23 March 2002 and he remained an unused substitute during the 2–0 defeat.

Incoming manager Ray Lewington promoted Lee to second-choice goalkeeper ahead of Espen Baardsen for the 2002–03 season and he made his senior debut in a 1–0 defeat to Preston North End on 4 March 2003. He made three further appearances (keeping a clean sheet in each match) before the Hornets closed out a mid-table season. Lee began the 2003–04 season as second-choice behind Alec Chamberlain, but a broken arm and the form of loanee Lenny Pidgeley saw Lee fail to make a single appearance during the season.

==== 2004–2007 ====
Lee went on to establish himself as Watford's first choice goalkeeper during the 2004–05 Championship season, making 38 appearances and signing a new 3 1/2-year contract, before a ruptured biceps and a torn cartilage prematurely ended his season. He played in every match of the Hornets' run to the League Cup semi-finals, but he missed the two-legged tie against Liverpool due to a broken cheekbone suffered in a defeat to Coventry City a month previously.

Out of favour with Watford manager Aidy Boothroyd, Lee joined Premier League club Blackburn Rovers on loan until the end of the 2005–06 season on 25 August 2005. He was only called into the first team squad once, when he was unused substitute for a 4–1 victory over Charlton Athletic on 5 November 2005. In his absence, Watford were victorious in the 2006 Championship playoff Final and sealed a place in the Premier League.

Behind Ben Foster and Alec Chamberlain in the pecking order, Lee made just 14 appearances during the 2006–07 season and the Hornets were relegated straight back to the Championship. In January 2007, Lee signed a one-year extension to his contract, which would keep him at Vicarage Road until the end of the 2008–09 season.

==== 2007–2010 ====
Lee was undisputed first choice back in the Championship and made 41 appearances during the 2007–08 season, though Watford fell to Hull City in the playoff semi-finals. In Jay DeMerit's absence, manager Aidy Boothroyd made Lee captain for a period. Save for a run of 11 matches from September through to November 2008, Lee spent the 2008–09 season battling with Mart Poom for the position of second-choice goalkeeper behind Scott Loach. He signed a new one-year contract extension in May 2009, but spent the entire 2009–10 season behind Scott Loach in the pecking order and made just two League Cup appearances in August 2009.

Lee turned down the offer of a new contract and departed Vicarage Road on 31 May 2010, after making 110 appearances in eight years as a first team player with Watford. In 2015, Lee stated that failure to be seen as a consistent first-choice at Watford was down to being "seen as a good back up. I backed up Alec Chamberlain and he won player of the season, I backed up Ben Foster and he won an England cap, I backed up Scott Loach and he got an England cap. I guess because I never kicked up much of a fuss and I wanted those guys to do well, it didn't help my cause".

=== Brentford ===
==== 2010–2012 ====
On 31 May 2010, Lee signed for a two-year contract with League One club Brentford on a free transfer. He had a "car crash" beginning to the 2010–11 season, after being dropped by manager Andy Scott due to a poor performance during pre-season. He spent the early months of the season behind Simon Moore and loanees Alex McCarthy and Ben Hamer in the pecking order and appeared only in cup matches. After starting his first league game of the season against Bournemouth on 2 November 2010, he cemented his place in the team. Brentford's League Cup and Football League Trophy runs were the highlights of his season, helping the Bees to win four penalty shootouts to send them to the fourth round of the League Cup and the final of the Football League Trophy. He missed the Football League Trophy Final at Wembley Stadium and the rest of the season with a dislocated right shoulder suffered in March 2011. Lee made 33 appearances during the 2010–11 season and won the club's Player of the Year award.

Under new manager Uwe Rösler, Lee was first choice goalkeeper during the 2011–12 season and made 42 appearances, but his season ended early after further problems with his right shoulder. He signed a contract extension in October 2011, which would keep him at Griffin Park until the end of the 2012–13 season.

==== 2012–2015 ====
Lee began the 2012–13 season out injured and due to the form of Simon Moore, he made just six appearances. He signed a new one-year contract extension in December 2012 and underwent a shoulder reconstruction operation in March 2013, which kept him out of first team action for six months. He made just five appearances during Brentford's promotion-winning 2013–14 season and spent much of the season as backup to new signing David Button, though he won a promotion medal by virtue of being an unused substitute on the final day of the season versus Stevenage.

Lee signed a new one-year contract extension in February 2014, but after just one appearance during the first month of the 2014–15 season, he made the decision to retire at the end of the campaign. Lee's persistent shoulder injury could be traced back to the ruptured biceps he suffered in 2005 and he admitted in 2011 that playing through injuries had caused lasting damage. Lee spent the 2014–15 season as third-choice goalkeeper behind David Button and Jack Bonham and after falling to fourth-choice behind Development Squad goalkeeper Mark Smith, he joined Brentford's West London Championship rivals Fulham on loan in late March 2015. The move provoked a Twitter spat between the two clubs and Lee moved to tell a Brentford fan blog that he made the move in a search for first team football in the final months of his career. He failed to win a call into a Fulham squad before the end of the season. At the 2014–15 end-of-season awards dinner, Lee was presented with a long-service award for his five seasons at the club. He made 87 appearances during his time at Griffin Park.

=== Post-retirement ===
==== Hampton & Richmond Borough ====
On 27 November 2015, it was announced that Lee had come out of retirement to sign for Isthmian League Premier Division club Hampton & Richmond Borough. He stated that the move was purely on an emergency basis and manager Alan Dowson later commented that Lee had "not committed to training and is just looking after himself in his spare time".

==== Dunstable Town ====
In late November 2017, Lee came out of retirement to join Southern League Premier Division club Dunstable Town as one-match cover for loan goalkeeper Nick Hayes. Lee's single appearance ended in a 4–1 defeat to Bishop's Stortford.

== International career ==
Lee was capped by England at U18 and U20 level and made two substitute appearances for the latter team. He was called up to the U21 squad, but did not make an appearance.

== Coaching and mentoring career ==
Since June 2009, Lee has been a director of GK Icon, a goalkeeper training franchise. In 2012, Lee gained part one of his UEFA 'B' coaching license. Together with amateur footballer Rob Lovesey, in April 2011 Lee co-founded Sporting Connect, a football social network. Through the network, Lee is involved in youth coaching. He also mentors and acts as an agent for goalkeepers through sports management company Refuel Performance Management, in which he is a partner with former Brentford teammate Scott Barron.

== Personal life ==
Lee grew up in Aylesbury and is a Manchester United supporter. In January 2012, Lee published Graduation: Life Lessons of a Professional Footballer, a book detailing his experiences with Brentford during the 2010–11 season. The same year, Lee enrolled on a two-year PFA degree in Professional Sports Writing and Broadcasting at Staffordshire University, from which he graduated with honours in July 2014. Throughout 2013, Lee contributed to the Footballers' Football Column in the Daily Mail. He appeared on Channel 4's Couples Come Dine With Me with his then fiancée Marina Nigrelli on 7 May 2015. After retiring from professional football in May 2015, Lee began contributing to Sky Sports' Soccer Saturday as a pundit and reporter and working as a motivational speaker.

=== Business interests ===
On 31 August 2006, Lee appeared on the BBC programme Dragons' Den, where he and a partner managed to sell 50% of the equity in their company Dr. Cap to the entrepreneur Duncan Bannatyne for an investment of £150,000. The investment deal later collapsed. Lee resigned as a director of the company in September 2015. In 2012, Lee set up the social media platform The Goalkeeper's Union (GKU), which features goalkeeping-related news, interviews, podcasts and blogs. In December 2014, Lee set up dickieleecoffee.com, through which he initially distributed Organo Gold coffee products. He co-founded the Bean Team (a multi-level marketing product distribution group) with former Brentford teammate David Hunt in 2015, distributing Organo Gold in the UK and overseas. In 2017, together with Adam Woodage, Lee authored a book, So, You Want To Become a Professional Footballer?.

== Career statistics ==
Appearances and goals by club, season and competition
Club	Season	League			FA Cup		League Cup		Other		Total	
Club	Season	Division	Apps	Goals	Apps	Goals	Apps	Goals	Apps	Goals	Apps	Goals
Watford	2001–02	First Division	0	0	0	0	0	0	—		0	0
Watford	2002–03	First Division	4	0	0	0	0	0	—		4	0
Watford	2003–04	First Division	0	0	0	0	0	0	—		0	0
Watford	2004–05	Championship	33	0	5	0	0	0	—		38	0
Watford	2005–06	Championship	0	0	—		0	0	0	0	0	0
Watford	2006–07	Premier League	10	0	2	0	2	0	—		14	0
Watford	2007–08	Championship	35	0	2	0	2	0	2 (Note: Appearances in Championship play-offs)	0	41	0
Watford	2008–09	Championship	10	0	1	0	0	0	—		11	0
Watford	2009–10	Championship	0	0	2	0	0	0	—		2	0
Watford	Total		92	0	12	0	4	0	2	0	110	0
Blackburn Rovers (loan)	2005–06	Premier League	0	0	0	0	0	0	—		0	0
Brentford	2010–11	League One	22	0	3	0	2	0	6 (Note: Appearances in Football League Trophy)	0	33	0
Brentford	2011–12	League One	37	0	0	0	2	0	3	0	42	0
Brentford	2012–13	League One	3	0	0	0	2	0	1	0	6	0
Brentford	2013–14	League One	4	0	1	0	0	0	0	0	5	0
Brentford	2014–15	Championship	0	0	0	0	1	0	—		1	0
Brentford	Total		66	0	4	0	7	0	10	0	87	0
Dunstable Town	2017–18	Southern League Premier Division	1	0	—		—		—		1	0
Career total			159	0	16	0	11	0	12	0	198	0

== Honours ==
Brentford

- Football League One second-place promotion: 2013–14

Individual

- Brentford Supporters' Player of the Year: 2010–11
