= 2010–11 Brentford F.C. season =

English football team season

Brentford
2010–11 season
- Chairman: Greg Dyke
- Manager: Andy Scott (until 3 February 2011); Nicky Forster (from 3 February 2011)
- Stadium: Griffin Park
- League One: 11th
- FA Cup: First round
- Football League Cup: Fourth round
- Football League Trophy: Runners-up
- Top goalscorer: League: Alexander, MacDonald (9); All: Alexander (12)
- Average home league attendance: 5,172
Home colours	Away colours	Third colours

During the 2010–11 English football season, Brentford competed in Football League One. The mid-table season was memorable for runs to the final of the Football League Trophy and the fourth round of the League Cup.

== Season summary ==
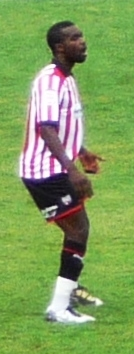
Homegrown central defender Karleigh Osborne made a career-high 51 appearances during the season.

After an impressive 9th-place finish at the end of the Brentford's first season in League One since 2006–07, manager Andy Scott signed almost an entirely new team. Released were centre back Mark Phillips and forward Steve Kabba and six players were transferred out during the off-season, with the most notable departures being left back Ryan Dickson to Championship club Southampton and captain Alan Bennett to League Two Wycombe Wanderers. 11 players were transferred in before the end of the summer transfer window, including two goalkeepers (Richard Lee, Simon Royce), four defenders (Pim Balkestein, David McCracken, Michael Spillane, Craig Woodman), two midfielders (Nicky Adams, Toumani Diagouraga) and forwards Gary Alexander and Kirk Hudson, with Nicky Forster returning to Griffin Park for the first time since his departure in 1997. Huddersfield Town forward Robbie Simpson was signed on a season-long loan.

Brentford opened the league season with a run of just two wins from the opening 11 matches, which left the club bottom of the table by late September 2010. However, some cheer was had in the League Cup, with the Bees progressing to the fourth round to equal the club record for its furthest progression in the competition. After seeing off League Two club Cheltenham Town in the first round, the Bees beat Championship side Hull City 2–1 at Griffin Park in the second round, clinching victory with an 88th-minute diving header from Marcus Bean. The victory set up a third round tie at with Premier League club Everton at Griffin Park. Gary Alexander cancelled out Séamus Coleman's early goal and the teams were locked together until full-time and through the extra time period. Goalkeeper Richard Lee was Brentford's hero in the penalty shootout, helping the club win the first of the four shootouts it would compete in during the season. The Bees took Premier League club Birmingham City to a shootout at St Andrew's in the fourth round after a 1–1 draw, but were knocked out.

Brentford recovered its form in League One between 2 October 2010 and 1 January 2011, winning 8 and losing just two matches of an 11-match spell, but manager Andy Scott was moved to complain to the press of the "negativity" surrounding the club, despite the run being achieved with players missing through injury and including a club-record equalling five consecutive away league wins. By early January the Bees had also progressed to the Southern Area finals of the Football League Trophy, but a draw in the first leg versus Exeter City was one of only two draws secured during an 8-match winless run which kicked off 2011. A 4–1 away defeat to bottom-place club Dagenham & Redbridge on 1 February led to calls from the Brentford supporters for the removal of Andy Scott as manager. Two days after the match, Scott and assistant manager Terry Bullivant were sacked. Captain Kevin O'Connor remarked that the blame led with the players, for "making far too many individual mistakes".

Forward Nicky Forster was named as caretaker manager on 3 February 2011 and Brentford owner Matthew Benham brought in Mark Warburton as first team coach. An unbeaten run in his first six matches in all competitions led to Forster being named as manager until the end of the season. The run included a 2–1 away victory over Exeter City in the Football League Trophy Southern Area final second leg, which set up a Wembley final versus Carlisle United on 3 April. The Bees won four and lost three of the seven league matches preceding the final, which included a 2–1 victory over Carlisle United at Griffin Park. Brentford's third Football League Trophy final appearance ended with a 1–0 defeat, in which the Bees' "domination failed to yield a single shot on target" and midfielder Toumani Diagouraga was sent off for two bookable offences. In the aftermath of the defeat, Brentford meandered through the remainder of the league season to finish in 11th place.

== League table ==
Pos	Team	Pld	W	D	L	GF	GA	GD	Pts
9	Rochdale	46	18	14	14	63	55	+8	68
10	Colchester United	46	16	14	16	57	63	−6	62
11	Brentford	46	17	10	19	55	62	−7	61
12	Carlisle United	46	16	11	19	60	62	−2	59
13	Charlton Athletic	46	15	14	17	62	66	−4	59

Updated to match(es) played on 2 May 2011. Source: BBC
Rules for classification: 1) points; 2) goal difference; 3) number of goals scored.

== Results ==
=== Pre-season ===
14 July 2010 Kevin O'Connor testimonial	Brentford	0–5	Fulham	Griffin Park
20:00		Report	Baird 14'; Elm 24'; Duff 29'; Johnson 49'; Davies 67'	Attendance: 4136

17 July 2010	Tonbridge Angels	0–0	Brentford	Longmead Stadium
15:00		Report		Attendance: 486

20 July 2010	Brentford	1–1	Wycombe Wanderers	Griffin Park
20:00	Betsy	Report	Hunt	Attendance: 984

22 July 2010	Staines Town	3–2	Brentford	Wheatsheaf Park
19:30	Butler; Ifura; Griffiths	Report	Spillane; Saunders	Attendance: 694

27 July 2010	Woking	0–4	Brentford	Kingfield Stadium
19:45		Report	Forster; Spillane; Weston; Weston	Attendance: 658

28 July 2010	Hendon	0–1	Brentford	Vale Farm
19:45		Report	Bush

30 July 2010	Brentford	1–1	Crystal Palace	Griffin Park
20:00	Forster	Report	Cagogan	Attendance: 2166

=== League One ===
==== Results by round ====
Round	1	2	3	4	5	6	7	8	9	10	11	12	13	14	15	16	17	18	19	20	21	22	23	24	25	26	27	28	29	30	31	32	33	34	35	36	37	38	39	40	41	42	43	44	45	46
Ground	A	H	A	H	H	A	H	A	A	H	H	A	H	A	H	H	A	A	A	H	A	A	A	H	A	H	A	H	A	H	H	H	A	H	A	H	H	H	A	H	A	A	H	A	H	A
Result	L	L	D	L	W	D	D	L	L	W	L	W	W	W	D	L	W	W	W	W	L	L	L	D	L	L	L	W	D	W	W	D	L	L	W	L	W	W	W	L	L	W	D	D	L	D
Position	21	23	22	24	22	19	19	22	24	23	24	21	19	15	14	18	13	13	10	9	10	13	13	12	16	17	19	14	15	15	14	14	14	16	14	15	11	10	9	11	11	10	10	10	10	11

A = Away; H = Home; W = Win; D = Draw; L = Loss

==== Results summary ====
Overall								Home						Away					
Pld	W	D	L	GF	GA	GD	Pts	W	D	L	GF	GA	GD	W	D	L	GF	GA	GD
46	17	10	19	55	62	−7	61	9	5	9	24	28	−4	8	5	10	31	34	−3

==== League position graph ====
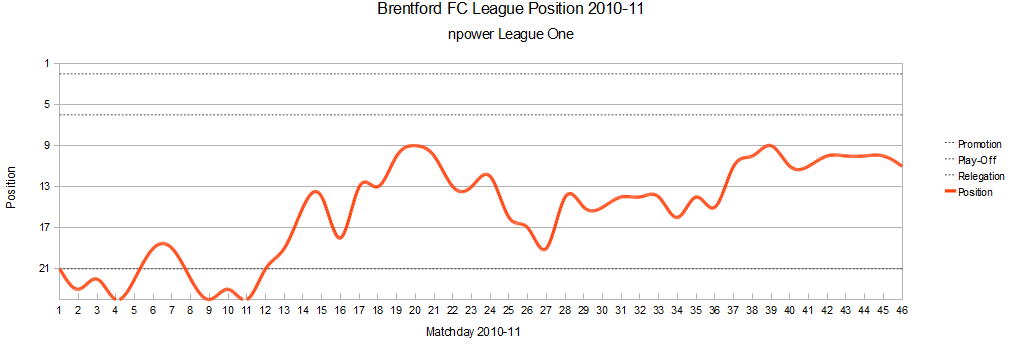

==== Matches ====
7 August 2010 1	Carlisle United	2–0	Brentford	Brunton Park
15:00	Madine 22'; Harte 45+1' (pen.)	Report		Attendance: 5913; Referee: A. Haynes

14 August 2010 2	Brentford	1–2	Walsall	Griffin Park
15:00	Alexander 44' Bean (yellow card) 90'	Report	Nicholls 12'; Gray 54' Brain (yellow card) 29'	Attendance: 4544; Referee: G. Sutton

21 August 2010 3	Swindon Town	1–1	Brentford	The County Ground
15:00	Prutton 40' Prutton (yellow card) 24'; Douglas (yellow card) 43'	Report	MacDonald 8'	Attendance: 8132; Referee: S. Rushton

28 August 2010 4	Brentford	1–3	Rochdale	Griffin Park
15:00	Simpson 27' Simpson (yellow card) 79'	Report	Elding 11'; O'Grady 60'; Kennedy 62' Kennedy (yellow card) 18'; Holness (yellow card) 51'; Kennedy (red card) 62'	Attendance: 4636; Referee: S. Hooper

5 September 2010 5	Brentford	1–0	Sheffield Wednesday	Griffin Park
12:00	MacDonald 41'	Report	Purse (yellow card) 79'	Attendance: 5396; Referee: G. Hegley

11 September 2010 6	Bristol Rovers	0–0	Brentford	Memorial Stadium
15:00	Campbell (yellow card) 30'; Lines (yellow card) 38'; Sawyer (yellow card) 60'; Sawyer (red card) 70'	Report	Osborne (yellow card) 19'	Attendance: 5609; Referee: S. Mathieson

18 September 2010 7	Brentford	0–0	Hartlepool United	Griffin Park
15:00		Report	Haslam (yellow card) 90'	Attendance: 4710; Referee: K. Wright

24 September 2010 8	Leyton Orient	1–0	Brentford	Brisbane Road
19:45	McGleish 25' Omozusi (yellow card) 13'; Spring (yellow card) 45+2'; Dawson (yellow card) 51'	Report	Spillane (yellow card) 51'	Attendance: 4485; Referee: G. Scott

28 September 2010 9	Brighton & Hove Albion	1–0	Brentford	Withdean Stadium
19:45	LuaLua 78' El-Abd (yellow card) 63'	Report	Bean (yellow card) 19'; Osborne (yellow card) 80'	Attendance: 6740; Referee: G. Ward

2 October 2010 10	Brentford	2–1	Charlton Athletic	Griffin Park
15:00	Alexander 13'; Diagouraga 31' Spillane (yellow card) 83'	Report	Wagstaff 74'	Attendance: 6342; Referee: A. Penn

9 October 2010 11	Brentford	1–3	Oldham Athletic	Griffin Park
15:00	Weston 4' Legge (yellow card) 64'	Report	Furman 14'; Taylor 46'; Stephens pen.' (65) Alessandra (yellow card) 54'; Lee (yellow card) 59'; Taylor (yellow card) 61'; Evina (yellow card) 78'; Tounkara (yellow card) 83'	Attendance: 5339; Referee: Keith Stroud

16 October 2010 12	Tranmere Rovers	0–3	Brentford	Prenton Park
15:00	Darville (yellow card) 18'	Report	O'Connor pen' (7); O'Connor 67'; Bean 81' MacDonald (yellow card) 67'; Alexander (yellow card) 77'	Attendance: 4929; Referee: D. Webb

23 October 2010 13	Brentford	2–1	Peterborough United	Griffin Park
15:00	Woodman 39'; Alexander 58' Spillane (yellow card) 85'	Report	McCann pen.' (19) Mackail-Smith (yellow card) 85'; Zakuani (yellow card) 86'	Attendance: 6543; Referee: D. Phillips

30 October 2010 14	Exeter City	2–4	Brentford	St James Park
15:00	Cureton 28', 58' Duffy (yellow card) 89'	Report	Legge 4'; Alexander 62'; Wood 64'; MacDonald 72' Bean (yellow card) 48'; Spillane (yellow card) 56'; Hamer (yellow card) 67'	Attendance: 5510; Referee: Darren Deadman

2 November 2010 15	Brentford	1–1	Bournemouth	Griffin Park
19:45	Grabban pen.' (68) Legge (yellow card) 44'	Report	Hollands 64' Bradbury (yellow card) 31'; Wiggins (yellow card) 90'	Attendance: 5278; Referee: A. Woolmer

13 November 2010 16	Brentford	0–2	Milton Keynes Dons	Griffin Park
15:00	Woodman (yellow card) 27'; Osborne (yellow card) 62'; Balkestein (yellow card) 86'; Balkestein (yellow card) 87' (red card)	Report	Doumbé 57'; Balanta 59' Leven (yellow card) 58'; Guy (yellow card) 85'	Attendance: 4789; Referee: F. Graham

20 November 2010 17	Plymouth Argyle	1–2	Brentford	Home Park
15:00	Fallon 38'	Report	Bean 26'; MacDonald 67'	Attendance: 6939; Referee: P. Gibbs

23 November 2010 18	Colchester United	0–2	Brentford	Colchester Community Stadium
19:45		Report	Alexander 26'; MacDonald 90' Woodman (yellow card) 83'	Attendance: 3172; Referee: D. Foster

4 December 2010 Postponed	Brentford	P–P	Notts County	Griffin Park
19:45

11 December 2010 19	Southampton	0–2	Brentford	St Mary's Stadium
15:00	Seaborne (yellow card) 16'; Hammond (yellow card) 50'	Report	Alexander 13'; MacDonald 28' Diagouraga (yellow card) 67'	Attendance: 19641; Referee: O. Langford

18 December 2010 Postponed	Brentford	P–P	Huddersfield Town	Griffin Park
15:00

26 December 2010 Postponed	Yeovil Town	P–P	Brentford	Huish Park
15:00

28 December 2010 Postponed	Brentford	P–P	Tranmere Rovers	Griffin Park
15:00

1 January 2011 20	Brentford	2–1	Dagenham & Redbridge	Griffin Park
15:00	Simpson 10'; Alexander 87' Wood (yellow card) 13'	Report	Vincelot 34' Antwi (yellow card) 31'	Attendance: 5405; Referee: G. Horwood

3 January 2011 21	Bournemouth	3–1	Brentford	Dean Court
19:45	Feeney 11'; Bartley 70'; Fletcher 88' Smith (yellow card) 67'	Report	Bradbury 65' (o.g.)	Attendance: 6877; Referee: J. Linington

8 January 2011 22	Yeovil Town	2–0	Brentford	Huish Park
15:00	Huntington 32'; A.Williams 59' S.Williams (yellow card) 70'; Smith (yellow card) 90'	Report	Woodman (yellow card) 14'; Forster (yellow card) 70'; Wright (yellow card) 79'	Attendance: 3688; Referee: A. Woolmer

11 January 2011 23	Peterborough United	2–1	Brentford	London Road
19:45	McCann 5' (pen.); Obika 90+3'	Report	Laird 74' Laird (yellow card) 30'; Osborne (yellow card) 88'	Attendance: 4667; Referee: R. Madley

14 January 2011 24	Brentford	1–1	Exeter City	Griffin Park
19:45	Forster 90+4'	Report	O'Flynn 2' Duffy (yellow card) 32'; Nardiello (yellow card) 63'; Noble (yellow card) 90+3'	Attendance: 4767; Referee: R. East

22 January 2011 25	Oldham Athletic	2–1	Brentford	Boundary Park
15:00	Tounkara 40'; Morais 70'	Report	Simpson 82'	Attendance: 3759; Referee: C. Sarginson

29 January 2011 26	Brentford	1–2	Yeovil Town	Griffin Park
15:00	MacDonald 39' Alexander (yellow card) 42'; Spillane (yellow card) 64'; Woodman (yellow card) 70'; Lee (red card) 81'	Report	Johnson 22'; Wotton 83' Johnson (yellow card) 23'; Kalala (yellow card) 76'; Wooton (yellow card) 78'	Attendance: 4753; Referee: P. Quinn

1 February 2011 27	Dagenham & Redbridge	4–1	Brentford	Victoria Road
19:45	Nurse 19', 66'; Osborne 56' (o.g.); Vincelot 67'	Report	MacDonald 90+4'	Attendance: 1907; Referee: S. Hooper

5 February 2011 28	Brentford	2–0	Plymouth Argyle	Griffin Park
15:00	Weston 35', 56' Osborne (yellow card) 37'	Report	Arnason (yellow card) 83'	Attendance: 5613; Referee: D. Drysdale

12 February 2011 29	Milton Keynes Dons	1–1	Brentford	Stadium:mk
15:00	Marsh-Brown 48'	Report	Grabban 50' Bean (yellow card) 27'; Saunders (yellow card) 48'; Alexander (yellow card) 58'	Attendance: 8636; Referee: D. Coote

22 February 2011 30	Brentford	2–1	Tranmere Rovers	Griffin Park
19:45	MacDonald 2'; Legge 90+1' Simpson (yellow card) 90'	Report	Labadie 65' Labadie (yellow card) 43'; Akins (yellow card) 62'; Kay (yellow card) 84'	Attendance: 4192; Referee: P. Miller

26 February 2011 31	Brentford	1–0	Bristol Rovers	Griffin Park
15:00	Alexander pen.20'	Report	Lines (yellow card) 15'; Logan (yellow card) 18'; Sawyer (yellow card) 37'	Attendance: 5944; Referee: C. Pawson

1 March 2011 32	Brentford	1–1	Notts County	Griffin Park
19:45	Osborne 74' Bean (yellow card) 55'; Byrne (yellow card) 80'	Report	Westcarr 44' Harley (yellow card) 19'; Harley (red card) 24'; Regan (yellow card) 28'; Edwards (yellow card) 75'; Gobern (yellow card) 87'; Edwards (red card) 90'; Pearce (yellow card) 90+3'	Attendance: 3795; Referee: I. Williamson

5 March 2011 33	Hartlepool United	3–0	Brentford	Victoria Park
15:00	Monkhouse 36'; Monkhouse 57'; Liddle 83' Murray (yellow card) 51'; Brown (yellow card) 90+2'	Report	Reed (yellow card) 61'; Legge (yellow card) 76'	Attendance: 2936; Referee: K. Evans

8 March 2011 34	Brentford	0–1	Brighton & Hove Albion	Griffin Park
19:45	Legge (yellow card) 40'; Reed (yellow card) 73'	Report	Osborne 74' (o.g.) Bridcutt (yellow card) 43'; Elphick (yellow card) 66'; Dicker (yellow card) 90+3'	Attendance: 5694; Referee: S. Hooper

12 March 2011 35	Charlton Athletic	0–1	Brentford	The Valley
15:00	Dailly (yellow card) 45'	Report	Legge 89' Weston (yellow card) 59'	Attendance: 14985; Referee: M. Russell

15 March 2011 36	Brentford	0–1	Huddersfield Town	Griffin Park
19:45		Report	Clarke 90+2'	Attendance: 4402; Referee: D. Whitestone

19 March 2011 37	Brentford	2–1	Leyton Orient	Griffin Park
15:00	Bean 6'; Alexander 24'	Report	McGleish 55'	Attendance: 6368; Referee: D. Phillips

25 March 2011 38	Brentford	2–1	Carlisle United	Griffin Park
19:45	Schlupp 74', 83' Legge (yellow card) 85'	Report	Michalík 88' Arter (yellow card) 38'	Attendance: 4365; Referee: R. East

29 March 2011 39	Sheffield Wednesday	1–3	Brentford	Hillsborough
19:45	Jones 12' Osbourne (yellow card) 84'	Report	Spillane 3'; Schlupp 18', 82'	Attendance: 14797; Referee: A. Haines

9 April 2011 40	Brentford	0–1	Swindon Town	Griffin Park
15:00	Legge (yellow card) 71'	Report	Andrew 80' Jean-François (yellow card) 61'; Andrew (yellow card) 80'	Attendance: 4593; Referee: R. Madley

12 April 2011 41	Walsall	3–2	Brentford	Bescot Stadium
19:45	Macken 40', 64'; Cook 57'	Report	Balkestein 30'; Grabban 62'	Attendance: 3154; Referee: C. Boyeson

16 April 2011 42	Rochdale	0–1	Brentford	Spotland Stadium
15:00	Jones (yellow card) 64'	Report	Simpson 79'	Attendance: 2963; Referee: D. Drysdale

22 April 2011 43	Brentford	1–1	Colchester United	Griffin Park
15:00	Saunders 74' Reed (yellow card) 88'	Report	Henderson 15' Izzet (yellow card) 72'; Wilson (yellow card) 88'	Attendance: 4480; Referee: G. Horwood

25 April 2011 44	Notts County	1–1	Brentford	Meadow Lane
15:00	Hughes 82' (pen.) Chilvers (yellow card) 45+1'; Bishop (yellow card) 51'; Craig Westcarr (yellow card) 65'	Report	Schlupp 90+5' Bean (yellow card) 51'; Simpson (yellow card) 61'; O'Connor (yellow card) 75'; Saunders (yellow card) 75'; Moore (yellow card) 82'; Wood (yellow card) 90+5'	Attendance: 6879; Referee: D. Foster

30 April 2011 45	Brentford	0–3	Southampton	Griffin Park
15:00		Report	Lallana 16'; Connolly 30'; Gobern 90+1' Fonte (yellow card) 81'	Attendance: 7015; Referee: T. Kettle

7 May 2011 46	Huddersfield Town	4–4	Brentford	Kirkless Stadium
15:00	Ward 14', 15'; Novak 52'; Afobe 63' Naysmith (yellow card) 80'	Report	Schlupp 45+1', 50'; Grabban 58', 68' Grabban (yellow card) 37'; Neilson (yellow card) 58'	Attendance: 13977; Referee: A. Bates

=== FA Cup ===
6 November 2010 1st Round	Brentford	1–1	Aldershot Town	Griffin Park
15:00	MacDonald 20' Weston (yellow card) 61'; Diagouraga (yellow card) 75'	Report	Small 13'	Attendance: 4090; Referee: R. Booth

16 November 2010 1st Round Replay	Aldershot Town	1–0	Brentford	Recreation Ground
19:45	Small 8' Harding (yellow card) 73'	Report	Legge (yellow card) 58'	Attendance: 3627; Referee: S. Tanner

=== Football League Cup ===
10 August 2010 1st Round	Brentford	2–1	Cheltenham Town	Griffin Park
19:45	Simpson 31'; Woodman 35'	Report	Jeffers 61'	Attendance: 2049; Referee: P. Miller

24 August 2010 2nd Round	Brentford	2–1	Hull City	Griffin Park
19:45	Simpson 20'; Bean 88' Bean (yellow card) 69'	Report	Cullen 6' Cullen (yellow card) 40'; Devitt (yellow card) 58'	Attendance: 3335; Referee: I. Williamson

21 September 2010 3rd Round	Brentford	1–1 (a.e.t.) (4–3 p)	Everton	Griffin Park
19:45	Alexander 41'	Report	Coleman 9' Coleman (yellow card) 59'; Fellaini (yellow card) 84'	Attendance: 8960; Referee: Oliver
	Penalties
	Weston (penalty scored); Forster (penalty scored); Spillane (penalty scored); MacDonald (penalty scored)		(penalty scored) Baines; (penalty scored) Neville; (penalty scored) Arteta; (penalty missed) Beckford; (penalty missed) Jagielka

26 October 2010 4th Round	Birmingham City	1–1 (a.e.t.) (4–3 p)	Brentford	St Andrew's
19:45	Phillips 90+2'	Report	Wood 68' MacDonald (yellow card) 86'; Lee (yellow card) 89'; Osborne (yellow card) 92'	Attendance: 15166 (3123 Brentford Fans); Referee: D. Whitestone
	Penalties
	Phillips (penalty scored); Gardner (penalty scored); Dann (penalty scored); Bowyer (penalty missed); Carr (penalty scored)		(penalty scored) O'Connor; (penalty scored) Hunt; (penalty missed) Spillane; (penalty scored) Grabban; (penalty missed) Woodman

=== Football League Trophy ===
31 August 2010 1st Round	Stevenage	0–1	Brentford	Broadhall Way
19:45		Report	Simpson 29'	Attendance: 1916; Referee: O. Langford

5 October 2010 2nd Round	Leyton Orient	0–0 (4–5 p)	Brentford	Brisbane Road
19:15	Omozusi (yellow card) 45'	Report	Wood (yellow card) 73'	Attendance: 1152; Referee: P. Crossley
	Penalties
	Dawson (penalty scored); Omozusi (penalty scored); Chorley (penalty scored); Daniels (penalty scored); Spring (penalty missed)		(penalty scored) Forster; (penalty scored) Hunt; (penalty scored) Saunders; (penalty scored) Alexander; (penalty scored) Woodman

9 November 2010 Southern QF	Swindon Town	1–1 (2–4 p)	Brentford	The County Ground
19:00	Austin 12'	Report	Simpson 38' Legge (yellow card) 65'	Attendance: 3469; Referee: J. Moss
	Penalties
	Austin (penalty scored); Ball (penalty missed); Timlin (penalty missed); Rose (penalty scored)		(penalty scored) O'Connor; (penalty scored) MacDonald; (penalty scored) Spillane; (penalty missed) Woodman; (penalty scored) Simpson

14 December 2010 Southern SF	Brentford	0–0 (3–1 p)	Charlton Athletic	Griffin Park
	Wright (yellow card) 3'; Bean (yellow card) 54'; O'Connor (yellow card) 58'	Report	Abbott (yellow card) 32'	Attendance: 2783; Referee: K. Hill
	Penalties
	O'Connor (penalty scored); MacDonald (penalty scored); Spillane (penalty missed); Alexander (penalty scored)		(penalty missed) Jackson; (penalty missed) Racon; (penalty missed) Reid; (penalty scored) Doherty

17 January 2011 Southern Final (1st leg)	Brentford	1–1	Exeter City	Griffin Park
	Alexander 64' Alexander (yellow card) 20'; Diagouraga (yellow card) 84'	Report	Cureton 39'	Attendance: 3093; Referee: M. Haywood

7 February 2011 Southern Final (2nd leg)	Exeter City	1–2	Brentford	St James Park
	Nardiello 90+5' Noble (yellow card) 73'	Report	Saunders 20'; Alexander 26' Alexander (yellow card) 76'; Bignall (yellow card) 87'	Attendance: 5322; Referee: K. Wright

3 April 2011 Final	Brentford	0–1	Carlisle United	Wembley
	Reed (yellow card) 19'; Legge (yellow card) 23'; Diagouraga (yellow card) 84'; Diagouraga (red card) 86'	Report	Murphy 12' Michalík (yellow card) 57'; Robson (yellow card) 76'	Attendance: 40476; Referee: G. Salisbury

== Playing squad ==
Players' ages are as of the opening day of the 2010–11 season.

No	Position	Name	Nationality	Date of birth (age)	Signed from	Signed in	Notes
Goalkeepers
1	GK	Richard Lee	(England)	5 October 1982 (aged 27)	Watford	2010	
21	GK	Simon Royce	(England)	9 September 1971 (aged 38)	Gillingham	2010	
31	GK	Simon Moore	(England)	19 May 1990 (aged 20)	Farnborough	2009	Loaned to Basingstoke Town
Defenders
3	DF	Craig Woodman	(England)	22 December 1982 (aged 27)	Wycombe Wanderers	2010	
5	DF	David McCracken	(Scotland)	16 October 1981 (aged 28)	Milton Keynes Dons	2010	Loaned to Bristol Rovers
6	DF	Pim Balkestein	(Netherlands)	29 April 1987 (aged 23)	Ipswich Town	2010	
12	DF	Michael Spillane	(Republic of Ireland)	23 March 1989 (aged 21)	Norwich City	2010	
17	DF	Ryan Blake	(Northern Ireland)	8 December 1991 (aged 18)	Youth	2009	Loaned to Woking & Ebbsfleet United
22	DF	Karleigh Osborne	(England)	19 March 1988 (aged 22)	Youth	2004	
24	DF	Stephen Wright	(England)	8 February 1980 (aged 30)	Unattached	2010	
25	DF	Chris Bush	(England)	12 June 1992 (aged 18)	Youth	2010	Loaned to Woking, AFC Wimbledon and Thurrock
27	DF	Robbie Neilson	(Scotland)	19 June 1980 (aged 30)	Leicester City	2011	On loan from Leicester City
32	DF	Leon Legge	(England)	1 July 1985 (aged 25)	Tonbridge Angels	2009	
33	DF	Nathan Byrne	(England)	5 June 1992 (aged 18)	Tottenham Hotspur	2011	On loan from Tottenham Hotspur
Midfielders
2	MF	Kevin O'Connor (c)	(Republic of Ireland)	24 February 1982 (aged 28)	Youth	2000	
4	MF	Marcus Bean	(Jamaica)	2 November 1984 (aged 25)	Blackpool	2008	
7	MF	Sam Saunders	(England)	29 August 1983 (aged 26)	Dagenham & Redbridge	2009	
11	MF	Myles Weston	(Antigua and Barbuda)	12 March 1988 (aged 22)	Notts County	2009	
13	MF	David Hunt	(England)	10 September 1982 (aged 27)	Shrewsbury Town	2009	Loaned to Crawley Town
16	MF	Sam Wood	(England)	9 August 1986 (aged 23)	Bromley	2008	
20	MF	Toumani Diagouraga	(France)	20 June 1987 (aged 23)	Peterborough United	2010	
26	MF	Adam Reed	(Philippines)	8 May 1991 (aged 19)	Sunderland	2011	On loan from Sunderland
34	MF	Jake Reeves	(England)	30 May 1993 (aged 17)	Youth	2011	Loaned to St Albans City
36	MF	Charlie Adams	(England)	30 May 1993 (aged 17)	Youth	2011	
37	MF	Manny Oyeleke	(England)	24 December 1992 (aged 17)	Youth	2011	
Forwards
8	FW	Nicky Forster	(England)	8 September 1973 (aged 36)	Brighton & Hove Albion	2010	Manager
10	FW	Charlie MacDonald	(England)	13 February 1981 (aged 29)	Southend United	2008	
14	FW	Kirk Hudson	(England)	12 December 1986 (aged 23)	Aldershot Town	2010	Loaned to AFC Wimbledon
19	FW	Lewis Grabban	(England)	12 January 1988 (aged 22)	Millwall	2009	Loaned from Millwall before transferring permanently
23	FW	Robbie Simpson	(England)	15 March 1985 (aged 25)	Huddersfield Town	2010	On loan from Huddersfield Town
29	FW	Gary Alexander	(England)	15 August 1979 (aged 30)	Millwall	2010	
30	FW	Jeffrey Schlupp	(Ghana)	23 December 1992 (aged 17)	Leicester City	2011	On loan from Leicester City
35	FW	Luke Hacker	(England)	30 June 1993 (aged 17)	Youth	2011	
Players who left the club mid-season
9	FW	Carl Cort	(Guyana)	1 November 1977 (aged 32)	Norwich City	2009	Retired
~~18~~	MF	Nicky Adams	(Wales)	16 October 1986 (aged 23)	Leicester City	2010	Loaned to Rochdale, transferred to Rochdale
18	FW	Nicholas Bignall	(England)	11 July 1990 (aged 20)	Reading	2011	Returned to Reading after loan
~~27~~	MF	Marc Laird	(Scotland)	23 January 1986 (aged 24)	Millwall	2011	Returned to Millwall after loan
~~27~~	FW	Rowan Vine	(England)	21 September 1982 (aged 27)	Queens Park Rangers	2010	Returned to Queens Park Rangers after loan
28	MF	Owain Tudur Jones	(Wales)	15 October 1984 (aged 25)	Norwich City	2011	Returned to Norwich City after loan
41	GK	Trevor Carson	(Northern Ireland)	5 March 1988 (aged 22)	Sunderland	2011	Returned to Sunderland after loan
~~41~~	GK	Alex McCarthy	(England)	3 December 1989 (aged 20)	Reading	2010	Returned to Reading after loan
51	GK	Ben Hamer	(England)	20 November 1987 (aged 22)	Reading	2010	Returned to Reading after loan

- Source: Soccerbase

== Coaching staff ==
=== Andy Scott (7 August 2010 – 3 February 2011) ===
Name	Role
(England) Andy Scott	Manager
(England) Terry Bullivant	Assistant Manager
(England) Simon Royce	Goalkeeping Coach

=== Nicky Forster (3 February – 7 May 2011) ===
Name	Role
(England) Nicky Forster	Manager
(England) Mark Warburton	First Team Coach
(England) Simon Royce	Goalkeeping Coach

== Statistics ==
=== Appearances and goals ===
Substitute appearances in brackets.

No	Pos	Nat	Name	League		FA Cup		League Cup		FL Trophy		Total	
No	Pos	Nat	Name	Apps	Goals	Apps	Goals	Apps	Goals	Apps	Goals	Apps	Goals
1	GK	(England)	Richard Lee	22	0	2	0	3	0	6	0	33	0
2	MF	(Republic of Ireland)	Kevin O'Connor	39 (2)	2	1 (1)	0	4	0	5 (1)	0	49 (4)	2
3	DF	(England)	Craig Woodman	40 (1)	1	2	0	4	1	7	0	53 (1)	2
4	MF	(Jamaica)	Marcus Bean	32 (5)	3	1	0	3 (1)	1	4 (1)	0	40 (7)	4
5	DF	(Scotland)	David McCracken	1 (1)	0	0	0	0	0	1	0	2 (1)	0
6	DF	(Netherlands)	Pim Balkestein	17 (3)	1	1	0	2	0	4	0	24 (3)	1
7	MF	(England)	Sam Saunders	18 (3)	2	1	0	0 (1)	0	3 (1)	1	22 (5)	3
8	FW	(England)	Nicky Forster	6 (12)	1	1 (1)	0	1 (1)	0	4	0	12 (14)	1
9	FW	(Guyana)	Carl Cort	0 (3)	0	0	0	0	0	0 (1)	0	0 (4)	0
10	FW	(England)	Charlie MacDonald	28 (2)	9	2	1	3 (1)	0	2 (1)	0	35 (4)	10
11	MF	(Antigua and Barbuda)	Myles Weston	33 (9)	3	1 (1)	0	3	0	4 (1)	0	41 (11)	3
12	DF	(Republic of Ireland)	Michael Spillane	18 (6)	1	1	0	2	0	3 (1)	0	24 (7)	1
13	MF	(England)	David Hunt	0 (3)	0	0	0	0 (1)	0	0 (1)	0	0 (5)	0
14	FW	(England)	Kirk Hudson	0 (2)	0	0 (1)	0	0	0	0 (1)	0	0 (4)	0
16	MF	(England)	Sam Wood	13 (7)	1	1	0	2	1	2 (2)	0	18 (9)	2
~~18~~	MF	(Wales)	Nicky Adams	3 (4)	0	—		1	0	2	0	6 (4)	0
19	FW	(England)	Lewis Grabban	13 (9)	5	—		0 (1)	0	0 (2)	0	13 (12)	5
20	MF	(France)	Toumani Diagouraga	32	1	2	0	2	0	6 (1)	0	42 (1)	1
21	GK	(England)	Simon Royce	1 (1)	0	0	0	0	0	0	0	1 (1)	0
22	DF	(England)	Karleigh Osborne	41 (1)	1	1	0	4	0	4	0	50 (1)	1
24	DF	(England)	Stephen Wright	9 (2)	0	2	0	—		1	0	12 (2)	0
29	FW	(England)	Gary Alexander	37 (1)	9	0	0	4	1	5	2	46 (1)	12
31	GK	(England)	Simon Moore	9 (1)	0	—		1	0	1	0	11 (1)	0
32	DF	(England)	Leon Legge	27 (3)	3	1	0	3	0	6	0	37 (3)	3
34	MF	(England)	Jake Reeves	0 (1)	0	0	0	0	0	0	0	0 (1)	0
35	FW	(England)	Luke Hacker	0 (1)	0	0	0	0	0	0	0	0 (1)	0
Players loaned in during the season
18	MF	(England)	Nicholas Bignall	1 (5)	0	—		—		0 (1)	0	1 (6)	0
23	FW	(England)	Robbie Simpson	11 (16)	4	2	0	2 (1)	2	3 (1)	2	18 (18)	8
26	MF	(Philippines)	Adam Reed	8 (3)	0	—		—		1	0	9 (3)	0
~~27~~	MF	(Scotland)	Marc Laird	4	1	—		—		1	0	5	1
27	DF	(Scotland)	Robbie Neilson	15	0	—		—		1	0	16	0
28	MF	(Wales)	Owain Tudur Jones	4 (2)	0	—		—		0	0	4 (2)	0
30	FW	(Ghana)	Jeffrey Schlupp	6 (3)	6	—		—		1	0	7 (3)	6
33	DF	(England)	Nathan Byrne	4 (7)	0	—		—		0	0	4 (7)	0
41	GK	(Northern Ireland)	Trevor Carson	1	0	—		—		0	0	1	0
~~41~~	GK	(England)	Alex McCarthy	3	0	—		—		—		3	0
51	GK	(England)	Ben Hamer	10	0	0	0	0	0	0	0	10	0

- Players listed in italics left the club mid-season.
- Source: Soccerbase

=== Goalscorers ===
No	Pos	Nat	Player	FL1	FAC	FLC	FLT	Total
29	FW	(England)	Gary Alexander	9	0	1	2	12
10	FW	(England)	Charlie MacDonald	9	1	0	0	10
23	FW	(England)	Robbie Simpson	4	0	2	2	8
30	FW	(Ghana)	Jeffrey Schlupp	6	—	—	0	6
19	FW	(England)	Lewis Grabban	5	—	0	0	5
4	MF	(Jamaica)	Marcus Bean	3	0	1	0	4
32	DF	(England)	Leon Legge	3	0	0	0	3
11	MF	(Antigua and Barbuda)	Myles Weston	3	0	0	0	3
7	MF	(England)	Sam Saunders	2	0	0	1	3
2	MF	(Republic of Ireland)	Kevin O'Connor	2	0	0	0	2
16	MF	(England)	Sam Wood	1	0	1	0	2
3	DF	(England)	Craig Woodman	1	0	1	0	2
~~27~~	MF	(Scotland)	Marc Laird	1	—	—	0	1
6	DF	(Netherlands)	Pim Balkestein	1	0	0	0	1
20	MF	(France)	Toumani Diagouraga	1	0	0	0	1
8	FW	(England)	Nicky Forster	1	0	0	0	1
22	DF	(England)	Karleigh Osborne	1	0	0	0	1
12	DF	(Republic of Ireland)	Michael Spillane	1	0	0	0	1
Total				55	1	6	5	67

- Players listed in italics left the club mid-season.
- Source: Soccerbase

=== Discipline ===
No	Pos	Nat	Player	FL1		FAC		FLC		FLT		Total		Pts
No	Pos	Nat	Player	Booked	Sent off (straight red)	Booked	Sent off (straight red)	Booked	Sent off (straight red)	Booked	Sent off (straight red)	Booked	Sent off (straight red)	Pts
4	MF	(Jamaica)	Marcus Bean	6	0	0	0	1	0	1	0	8	0	8
32	DF	(England)	Leon Legge	5	0	1	0	0	0	2	0	8	0	8
20	MF	(France)	Toumani Diagouraga	2	0	1	0	0	0	2	1	5	1	8
22	DF	(England)	Karleigh Osborne	5	0	0	0	1	0	0	0	6	0	6
12	DF	(Republic of Ireland)	Michael Spillane	5	0	0	0	0	0	0	0	5	0	5
3	DF	(England)	Craig Woodman	5	0	0	0	0	0	0	0	5	0	5
29	FW	(England)	Gary Alexander	3	0	0	0	0	0	2	0	5	0	5
6	DF	(Netherlands)	Pim Balkestein	1	1	0	0	0	0	0	0	1	1	4
1	GK	(England)	Richard Lee	0	1	0	0	1	0	0	0	1	1	4
26	MF	(Philippines)	Adam Reed	2	0	—		—		1	0	3	0	3
16	MF	(England)	Sam Wood	2	0	0	0	0	0	1	0	3	0	3
7	MF	(England)	Sam Saunders	2	0	0	0	0	0	0	0	2	0	2
23	FW	(England)	Robbie Simpson	2	0	0	0	0	0	0	0	2	0	2
24	DF	(England)	Stephen Wright	1	0	0	0	—		1	0	2	0	2
10	FW	(England)	Charlie MacDonald	1	0	0	0	1	0	0	0	2	0	2
2	MF	(Republic of Ireland)	Kevin O'Connor	1	0	0	0	0	0	1	0	2	0	2
11	MF	(Antigua and Barbuda)	Myles Weston	1	0	1	0	0	0	0	0	2	0	2
33	DF	(England)	Nathan Byrne	1	0	—		—		0	0	1	0	1
~~27~~	MF	(Scotland)	Marc Laird	1	0	—		—		0	0	1	0	1
27	DF	(Scotland)	Robbie Neilson	1	0	—		—		0	0	1	0	1
19	FW	(England)	Lewis Grabban	1	0	—		0	0	0	0	1	0	1
31	GK	(England)	Simon Moore	1	0	—		0	0	0	0	1	0	1
8	FW	(England)	Nicky Forster	1	0	0	0	0	0	0	0	1	0	1
51	GK	(England)	Ben Hamer	1	0	0	0	0	0	0	0	1	0	1
18	MF	(England)	Nicholas Bignall	0	0	—		—		1	0	1	0	1
Total				51	2	3	0	4	0	12	1	70	3	82

- Players listed in italics left the club mid-season.
- Source: ESPN FC

=== Management ===
Name	Nat	From	To	Record All Comps					Record League				
Name	Nat	From	To	P	W	D	L	W %	P	W	D	L	W %
Andy Scott	(England)	11 August 2012	19 May 2013	38	16	7	15	42.11	27	9	5	13	33.33
Nicky Forster	(England)	3 February 2011	7 May 2011	21	9	5	7	42.86	19	8	5	6	42.11

=== Summary ===
Games played	59 (46 League One, 2 FA Cup, 4 League Cup, 7 Football League Trophy)
Games won	21 (17 League One, 0 FA Cup, 2 League Cup, 2 Football League Trophy)
Games drawn	17 (10 League One, 1 FA Cup, 2 League Cup, 4 Football League Trophy)
Games lost	21 (19 League One, 1 FA Cup, 0 League Cup, 1 Football League Trophy)
Goals scored	67 (55 League One, 1 FA Cup, 6 League Cup, 5 Football League Trophy)
Goals conceded	72 (62 League One, 2 FA Cup, 4 League Cup, 4 Football League Trophy)
Clean sheets	13 (10 League One, 0 FA Cup, 0 League Cup, 3 Football League Trophy)
Biggest league win	3–0 versus Tranmere Rovers, 16 October 2010
Worst league defeat	3–0 on two occasions
Most appearances	53, Kevin O'Connor (41 League One, 2 FA Cup, 4 League Cup, 6 Football League Trophy)
Top scorer (league)	9, Gary Alexander, Charlie MacDonald
Top scorer (all competitions)	12, Gary Alexander

== Transfers & loans ==
Players transferred in
Date	Pos.	Name	Previous club	Fee	Ref.
1 July 2010	FW	(England) Nicky Forster	(England) Brighton & Hove Albion	Free	
1 July 2010	FW	(England) Kirk Hudson	(England) Aldershot Town	Undisclosed	
1 July 2010	GK	(England) Richard Lee	(England) Watford	Free	
1 July 2010	GK	(England) Simon Royce	(England) Gillingham	Free	
1 July 2010	DF	(England) Craig Woodman	(England) Wycombe Wanderers	Undisclosed	
2 July 2010	DF	(Republic of Ireland) Michael Spillane	(England) Norwich City	Undisclosed	
5 July 2010	DF	(Scotland) David McCracken	(England) Milton Keynes Dons	Undisclosed	
16 July 2010	MF	(France) Toumani Diagouraga	(England) Peterborough United	Undisclosed	
5 August 2010	FW	(England) Gary Alexander	(England) Millwall	Undisclosed	
5 August 2010	DF	(Netherlands) Pim Balkestein	(England) Ipswich Town	Undisclosed	
19 August 2010	MF	(Wales) Nicky Adams	(England) Leicester City	Undisclosed	
29 October 2010	DF	(England) Stephen Wright	Unattached	Free	
25 January 2011	FW	(England) Lewis Grabban	(England) Millwall	Free	
Players loaned in
Date from	Pos.	Name	From	Date to	Ref.
6 August 2010	FW	(England) Robbie Simpson	(England) Huddersfield Town	End of season	
12 August 2010	GK	(England) Alex McCarthy	(England) Reading	31 August 2010	
31 August 2010	GK	(England) Ben Hamer	(England) Reading	5 January 2011	
8 October 2010	FW	(England) Lewis Grabban	(England) Millwall	8 November 2010	
25 November 2010	FW	(England) Rowan Vine	(England) Queens Park Rangers	5 January 2011	
4 January 2011	MF	(Scotland) Marc Laird	(England) Millwall	30 January 2011	
21 January 2011	MF	(Wales) Owain Tudur Jones	(England) Norwich City	27 April 2011	
31 January 2011	FW	(England) Nicholas Bignall	(England) Reading	20 April 2011	
16 February 2011	DF	(Scotland) Robbie Neilson	(England) Leicester City	End of season	
21 February 2011	DF	(England) Nathan Byrne	(England) Tottenham Hotspur	End of season	
21 February 2011	MF	(Philippines) Adam Reed	(England) Sunderland	End of season	
14 March 2011	FW	(Ghana) Jeffrey Schlupp	(England) Leicester City	End of season	
24 March 2011	GK	(Northern Ireland) Trevor Carson	(England) Sunderland	20 April 2011	
24 March 2011	FW	(Northern Ireland) Jonathan Cosgrove	(England) Fulham	n/a	
Players transferred out
Date	Pos.	Name	Subsequent club	Fee	Ref.
1 July 2010	GK	(England) Nikki Bull	(England) Wycombe Wanderers	Free	
1 July 2010	DF	(England) Ryan Dickson	(England) Southampton	£125,000	
1 July 2010	DF	(England) Danny Foster	(England) Wycombe Wanderers	Free	
1 July 2010	FW	(England) Ben Strevens	(England) Wycombe Wanderers	Free	
1 July 2010	MF	(Jamaica) Cleveland Taylor	(Scotland) St Johnstone	Free	
23 July 2010	DF	(Republic of Ireland) Alan Bennett	(England) Wycombe Wanderers	Free	
1 January 2011	MF	(Wales) Nicky Adams	(England) Rochdale	Undisclosed	
Players loaned out
Date from	Pos.	Name	To	Date to	Ref.
31 August 2010	DF	(England) Chris Bush	(England) Woking	20 September 2010	
21 September 2010	DF	(England) Chris Bush	(England) AFC Wimbledon	10 January 2011	
23 September 2010	MF	(Spain) Pelayo Gomez Pico	(England) St Albans City	24 January 2011	
1 October 2010	DF	(Northern Ireland) Ryan Blake	(England) Woking	n/a	
1 October 2010	FW	(Northern Ireland) Kyle Vassell	(England) Woking	n/a	
9 October 2010	GK	(England) Simon Moore	(England) Basingstoke Town	5 January 2011	
14 October 2010	MF	(Wales) Nicky Adams	(England) Rochdale	1 January 2011	
1 January 2010	FW	(England) Kirk Hudson	(England) AFC Wimbledon	End of season	
1 January 2010	MF	(England) David Hunt	(England) Crawley Town	End of season	
10 January 2011	DF	(Northern Ireland) Ryan Blake	(England) Ebbsfleet United	End of season	
18 January 2011	DF	(Scotland) David McCracken	(England) Bristol Rovers	End of season	
February 2011	MF	(England) Jake Reeves	(England) St Albans City	n/a	
February 2011	FW	(Northern Ireland) Kyle Vassell	(England) St Albans City	n/a	
22 March 2011	DF	(England) Chris Bush	(England) Thurrock	n/a	
Players released
Date	Pos.	Name	Subsequent club	Join date	Ref.
24 January 2011	FW	(Guyana) Carl Cort	(United States) Tampa Bay Rowdies	10 August 2012	
22 June 2011	DF	(Scotland) David McCracken	(Scotland) St Johnstone	1 July 2011	
30 June 2011	DF	(England) Chris Bush	(England) AFC Wimbledon	1 July 2011	
30 June 2011	MF	(England) David Hunt	(England) Crawley Town	1 July 2011	
30 June 2011	FW	(England) Lewis Grabban	(England) Rotherham United	4 July 2011	
30 June 2011	GK	(England) Simon Royce	Retired		
30 June 2011	FW	(Northern Ireland) Kyle Vassell	(England) St Albans City	12 October 2011	
30 June 2011	DF	(England) Stephen Wright	(England) Hartlepool United	2 September 2011	

== Kit ==
The 2010–11 Brentford kit designs were chosen by the club's supporters and launched on 9 July 2010.

Supplier: Puma
Sponsor(s): Hertings (home), Bathwise (away & third)

Home	Away	Third

Source: brentfordfc.co.uk

Goalkeeper	Goalkeeper

Source: brentfordfc.co.uk

== Awards ==
- Supporters' Player of the Year: Richard Lee
- Community Player of the Year: Leon Legge
- Football League One Manager of the Month: Andy Scott (October 2010)
- Football League Family Excellence Award
