= Michael Spillane (footballer) =

Jersey footballer (born 1989)

Personal information
- Full name: Michael Edward Spillane
- Date of birth: 23 March 1989 (age 37)
- Place of birth: St Helier, Jersey
- Height: 6 ft 3 in (1.91 m)
- Positions: Defender; midfielder

Team information
- Current team: Cambridge City (manager)

Youth career
- –2006: Norwich City

Senior career*
Years	Team	Apps	(Gls)
2006–2010	Norwich City	26	(1)
2008–2009	→ Luton Town (loan)	38	(3)
2010–2012	Brentford	25	(1)
2011–2012	→ Dagenham & Redbridge (loan)	7	(1)
2012–2013	Dagenham & Redbridge	46	(7)
2013	Southend United	9	(0)
2013–2014	Cambridge United	16	(0)
2014–2015	Sutton United	53	(4)
2015–2016	Lowestoft Town	25	(4)
2016–2023	Chelmsford City	110	(13)
2021	→ Chelmsford City Reserves	2	(2)
Total		357	(36)

International career
2005–2006	Republic of Ireland U17	7	(0)
2007	Republic of Ireland U18	4	(2)
2006–2008	Republic of Ireland U19	22	(2)
2007–2009	Republic of Ireland U21	6	(1)

Managerial career
- 2025–: Cambridge City
- * Club domestic league appearances and goals

Michael Edward Spillane (born 23 March 1989) is a former professional footballer, who played as a defender, currently managing Cambridge City. Born in Jersey, he represented the Republic of Ireland at youth international level.

== Club career ==
Spillane signed a full, professional, three-year contract with Norwich City on 30 June 2006. He had already made his first team debut by this time against West Ham United in the 2006 FA Cup third round, making him the youngest ever player for Norwich City to play in the FA Cup.

Spillane was given his first extended run in the Norwich side by manager Peter Grant towards the end of the 2006–07 season. He got his chance in the centre of midfield due to injuries to Youssef Safri, Simon Lappin and Mark Fotheringham. This was after he initially played at right back under Nigel Worthington.

Spillane signed on loan for Luton Town for the 2008–09 season in August 2008. He scored his first Luton goal in the match against Aldershot Town on 13 September. Spillane made a total of 38 league appearances for Luton, scoring three goals. He was also part of the Luton side that won the Football League Trophy, beating Scunthorpe United 3–2 at Wembley.

In April 2009, Spillane signed a two-year contract extension with Norwich City. Spillane went on to play a bigger part in Norwich's 2009–10 League One winning season playing 13 times and scoring once against Leyton Orient, although he missed around half the season with injury. In July 2010, he transferred to Brentford for an undisclosed fee. In September 2010, he scored his penalty as Brentford knocked Everton out of the League Cup on penalties. Spillane scored his first and what turned out to be only Brentford goal in a 3–1 win at Sheffield Wednesday.

He signed on loan for Dagenham & Redbridge, on 17 November 2011, turning this into a permanent deal on 6 January 2012.

On 17 January 2013, Spillane signed for Southend United.

On 23 August 2013, Spillane signed a one-year deal with Cambridge United. He left the club on 31 January 2014 by mutual consent and joined Sutton United.

On 26 September 2015, Spillane signed for Lowestoft Town, becoming the eighth former Norwich player at the club. In December 2016, Spillane moved a tier higher to join Chelmsford City. On 30 March 2019, Spillane made his 100th appearance in all competitions for Chelmsford, captaining and scoring for the club in a 2–1 home win against Oxford City.

== Managerial career ==
On 30 January 2020, Spillane was confirmed as assistant to interim manager Robbie Simpson alongside Chris Whelpdale following the sacking of Rod Stringer at Chelmsford City. On 28 April 2020, Spillane was named as Chelmsford's Head of academy. On 12 October 2025, Spillane left Chelmsford City as assistant manager, following an approach from another club regarding their vacant managerial position.

On 13 October 2025, Spillane was announced as manager of Cambridge City.

== International career ==
Spillane has represented Republic of Ireland U17s, for whom he was the captain. Spillane also captained the Republic of Ireland U18s to an international tournament win, scoring twice in the Portugal tournament; netting in a 2–2 draw with Belgium and then striking a late winner against Portugal. The squad also recorded a 3–1 win against Georgia.

He has played six times for Republic of Ireland U21s, scoring the equaliser in a 1–1 draw against Germany in February 2009. Spillane won the Republic of Ireland Under-19 Player of the Year Award in March 2009.

== Personal life ==
Spillane was born in Jersey as a result of his mother being hospitalised on the island for the final eight weeks of her pregnancy. Spillane's uncle, Terry, has previously managed Stansted, Aveley and Maldon & Tiptree.

== Career statistics ==
As of match played 15 February 2021

Appearances and goals by club, season and competition
Club	Season	League			FA Cup		League Cup		Other		Total	
Club	Season	Division	Apps	Goals	Apps	Goals	Apps	Goals	Apps	Goals	Apps	Goals
Norwich City	2005–06	Championship	2	0	1	0	0	0	—		3	0
Norwich City	2006–07	Championship	5	0	0	0	2	0	—		7	0
Norwich City	2007–08	Championship	6	0	1	0	1	0	—		8	0
Norwich City	2009–10	League One	13	1	0	0	2	0	1 (Note: Appearance(s) in Football League Trophy)	0	16	1
Norwich City	Total		26	1	2	0	5	0	1	0	34	1
Luton Town (loan)	2008–09	League Two	39	3	3	1	1	0	6	0	49	4
Brentford	2010–11	League One	24	1	1	0	2	0	4	0	31	1
Brentford	2011–12	League One	1	0	—		0	0	0	0	1	0
Brentford	Total		25	1	1	0	2	0	4	0	32	1
Dagenham & Redbridge	2011–12	League Two	29	4	4	0	—		—		33	4
Dagenham & Redbridge	2012–13	League Two	24	4	1	0	1	0	1	1	27	5
Dagenham & Redbridge	Total		53	8	5	0	1	0	1	1	60	9
Southend United	2012–13	League Two	9	0	—		—		—		9	0
Cambridge United	2013–14	Conference Premier	16	0	0	0	—		4 (Note: Appearance(s) in FA Trophy)	0	20	0
Sutton United	2013–14	Conference South	11	1	—		—		2 (Note: Appearance(s) in Conference South play-offs)	0	13	1
Sutton United	2014–15	Conference South	35	1	2	2	—		2	0	39	3
Sutton United	2015–16	National League South	7	2	—		—		—		7	2
Sutton United	Total		53	4	2	2	—		4	0	59	6
Lowestoft Town	2015–16	National League South	25	4	1	0	—		1	0	27	4
Chelmsford City	2016–17	National League South	16	3	0	0	—		2 (Note: Appearance(s) in Essex Senior Cup)	0	18	3
Chelmsford City	2017–18	National League South	35	7	5	1	—		4 (Note: Three appearances in Essex Senior Cup, one appearance in National League South play-offs)	0	44	7
Chelmsford City	2018–19	National League South	35	3	1	0	—		6 (Note: Four appearances and one goal in Essex Senior Cup, one appearance in FA Trophy, one appearance in National League South play-offs)	1	42	4
Chelmsford City	2019–20	National League South	11	0	1	0	—		1	0	13	0
Chelmsford City	2020–21	National League South	6	0	1	0	—		0	0	7	0
Chelmsford City	Total		103	13	8	1	—		13	1	124	15
Career total			349	34	22	4	9	0	34	2	414	40

== Honours ==
Luton Town

- Football League Trophy: 2008–09

Norwich City

- Football League One: 2009–10
