= 2011 Football League Trophy final =

2011 Football League Trophy Final
- Event: 2010–11 Football League Trophy
Brentford	Carlisle United
0	1
- Date: 3 April 2011
- Venue: Wembley Stadium, London
- Referee: Graham Salisbury (Lancashire)
- Attendance: 40,476

The 2011 Football League Trophy Final was the 28th final of the domestic football cup competition for teams from Football Leagues One and Two, the Football League Trophy. The final was played at Wembley Stadium in London on 3 April 2011. The match was contested between Brentford and Carlisle United. Carlisle United won the match 1–0. Peter Murphy scored the winning goal, turning in a corner kick in the twelfth minute. It was the Cumbrians' second win in six attempts.

== Match details ==
3 April 2011
13:30 BST

Brentford	0–1	Carlisle United
	Report	Murphy 12'

Wembley Stadium, London
Attendance: 40,476
Referee: Graham Salisbury (Lancashire)

Brentford	Carlisle United

GK	31	(England) Simon Moore
RB	27	(Scotland) Robbie Neilson
CB	22	(England) Karleigh Osborne
CB	32	(England) Leon Legge	(yellow card) 24'
LB	3	(England) Craig Woodman		(substituted off) 88'
RM	7	(England) Sam Saunders
CM	20	(France) Toumani Diagouraga	(yellow card) 85' (yellow-red card) 87'
CM	26	(England) Adam Reed	(yellow card) 20'	(substituted off) 46'
LM	11	(England) Myles Weston		(substituted off) 78'
FW	29	(England) Gary Alexander
FW	30	(Germany) Jeffrey Schlupp
Substitutes:
GK	41	(Northern Ireland) Trevor Carson
MF	2	(Republic of Ireland) Kevin O'Connor		(substituted on) 88'
MF	4	(Jamaica) Marcus Bean		(substituted on) 46'
MF	33	(England) Nathan Byrne
FW	19	(England) Lewis Grabban		(substituted on) 78'
Manager:
(England) Nicky Forster

GK	1	(England) Adam Collin
RB	2	(United States) Frank Simek
CB	6	(Republic of Ireland) Peter Murphy
CB	25	(Slovakia) Ľubomír Michalík	(yellow card) 58'
LB	10	(England) Matty Robson	(yellow card) 77'
RM	14	(England) Ben Marshall		(substituted off) 23'
CM	11	(England) Paul Thirlwell (c)
CM	12	(England) Tom Taiwo		(substituted off) 88'
LM	21	(Republic of Ireland) James Berrett
CF	13	(Ivory Coast) François Zoko		(substituted off) 67'
CF	15	(England) Craig Curran
Substitutes:
GK	23	(England) Tony Caig
DF	5	(England) Danny Livesey
MF	17	(England) Liam Noble		(substituted on) 23'
FW	18	(Scotland) Rory Loy		(substituted on) 88'
FW	19	(Republic of Ireland) Paddy Madden		(substituted on) 67'
Manager:
(England) Greg Abbott

MATCH OFFICIALS

- Assistant referees:
  - Russell Fletcher (Derbyshire)
  - Richard West (East Yorkshire)
- Fourth official: Russell Booth (Nottinghamshire)

MATCH RULES

- 90 minutes
- Penalty shoot-out if scores still level
- Five named substitutes
- Maximum of three substitutions
