= Craig Woodman =

English footballer (born 1982)

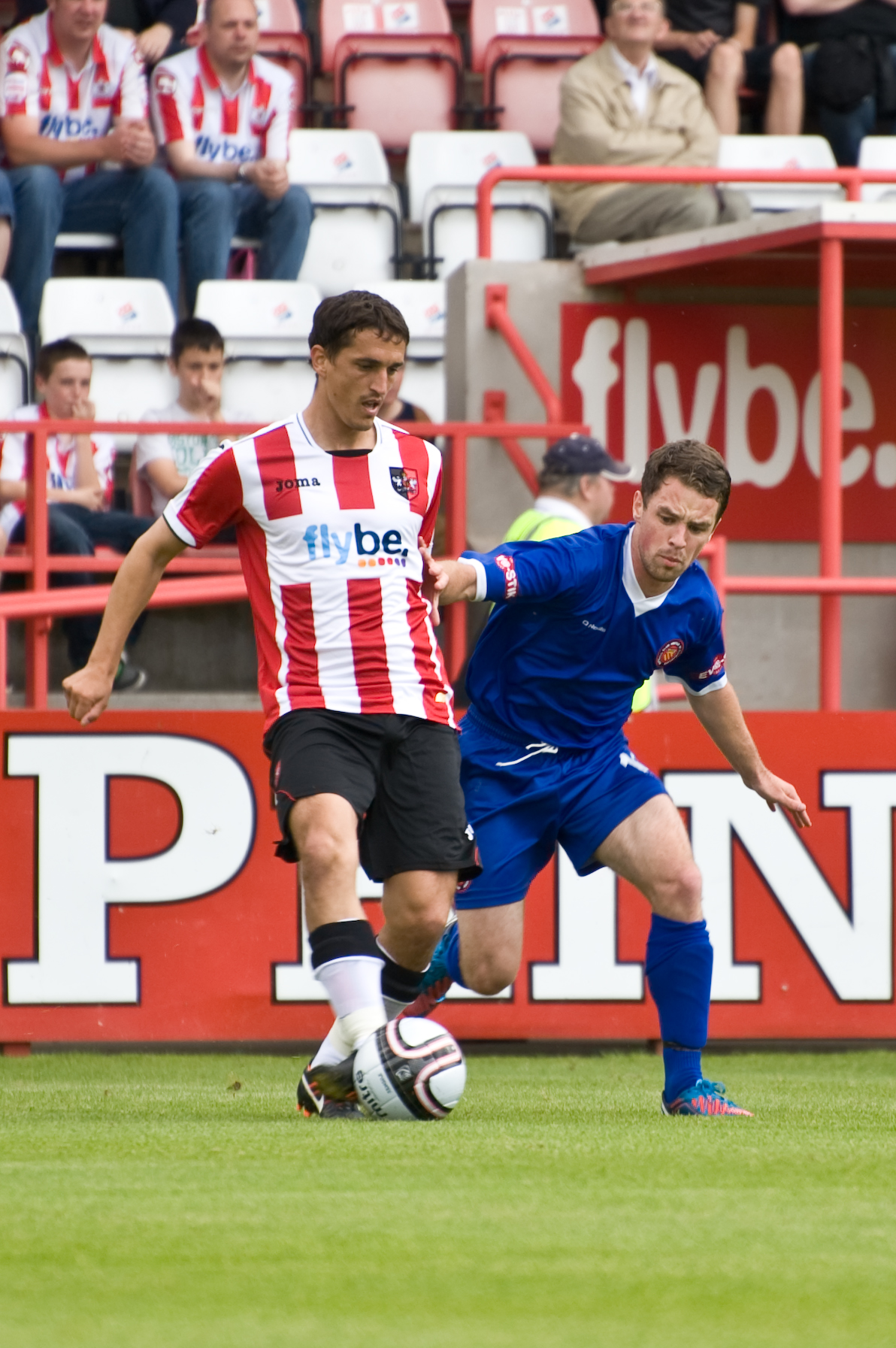
- Woodman in 2012

Personal information
- Full name: Craig Alan Woodman
- Date of birth: 22 December 1982 (age 43)
- Place of birth: Tiverton, England
- Position: Defender

Team information
- Current team: Cullompton Rangers

Youth career
- 1999–2000: Bristol City

Senior career*
Years	Team	Apps	(Gls)
2000–2007	Bristol City	93	(1)
2004	→ Mansfield Town (loan)	8	(1)
2004–2005	→ Torquay United (loan)	22	(1)
2005	→ Torquay United (loan)	2	(0)
2007–2010	Wycombe Wanderers	119	(2)
2010–2012	Brentford	59	(1)
2012–2020	Exeter City	246	(1)
2020–2023	Tiverton Town	67	(0)
2024	Willand Rovers	5	(0)
2024	Bridgwater United	3	(0)
2025–	Cullompton Rangers	14	(0)
Total		530	(7)
- * Club domestic league appearances and goals as of 17:26, 20 September 2025 (UTC)

Craig Alan Woodman (born 22 December 1982) is an English former professional footballer who plays as a defender for South West Peninsula League Premier Division East club Cullompton Rangers.

== Playing career ==
=== Bristol City ===
Woodman began his career with Bristol City as a trainee, turning professional in June 2000. His first team debut came on 5 December 2000 in the Football League Trophy defeat away to Plymouth Argyle. His league debut came on 24 February 2001, in a 4–0 defeat away to Colchester United.

He struggled to establish himself at City and in September 2004 joined Mansfield Town on loan, scoring his first professional goal there in a game against Notts County.

In December 2004 he joined Torquay United on loan making 22 appearances and scoring 1 goal against Colchester United. His goal came on the last day of the season but could not prevent his side losing 2–1 and being relegated.

Woodman returned to Torquay on loan in November 2005. Woodman made just four appearances before being recalled by Bristol City. Woodman scored his first and only goal for Bristol City in April 2006 against Tranmere Rovers.

Woodman was released from his contract at Bristol City on 9 May 2007. He signed with League Two side Wycombe Wanderers two weeks later.

=== Wycombe Wanderers ===
Woodman was a key player during the team's promotion season in 2008/09, missing just ten minutes of league action all year. His good form was rewarded when he won the Supporters' Player of the Year and the Players' Player of the Year awards at the end of the season.

Woodman was named the club captain in January 2010 following the release of Michael Duberry. Woodman retained his captaincy until March when manager Gary Waddock replaced him with Adam Hinshelwood.

=== Brentford ===
On 30 June 2010, Woodman moved to Brentford for an undisclosed fee. Woodman made 79 appearances and scored 2 goals for The Bees during his two seasons at Griffin Park; his two goals coming against Cheltenham Town in a League Cup tie and against Peterborough United in the league.

=== Exeter City ===
Woodman signed for League Two side Exeter City in July 2012 on a free transfer after his contract with Brentford was terminated by mutual consent. He went on to play over 250 games for the Grecians, and following Jordan Tillson's departure in January 2020, became the longest-serving player at the club. His first and only league goal for the Grecians came in 2014, when he netted a 30-yard thunderbolt free kick against Scunthorpe United to help Exeter avoid relegation from the Football League. Woodman was released by Exeter at the end of his contract in July 2020 after struggling with injury during the season, making only 3 league appearances in the 2019–20 campaign.

=== Non-League football ===
Woodman signed for hometown Southern League club Tiverton Town on 8 August 2020. On 29 November 2023, Woodman announced his retirement from football. He returned to non-League match play with spells at Willand Rovers, Bridgwater United and Cullompton Rangers.

== Career statistics ==
As of match played 20 September 2025

Appearances and goals by club, season and competition
Club	Season	League			National cup (Note: Includes FA Cup)		League cup (Note: Includes EFL Cup, Southern League Cup, South West Peninsula League Cup)		Other		Total	
Club	Season	Division	Apps	Goals	Apps	Goals	Apps	Goals	Apps	Goals	Apps	Goals
Bristol City	2000–01	Second Division	2	0	0	0	0	0	1 (Note: Appearance(s) in EFL Trophy)	0	3	0
Bristol City	2001–02	Second Division	6	0	0	0	0	0	3	0	9	0
Bristol City	2002–03	Second Division	10	0	0	0	1	0	2	0	13	0
Bristol City	2003–04	Second Division	21	0	3	0	1	0	4 (Note: One appearance in Football League Trophy, three appearances in Football League Second Division play-offs)	0	29	0
Bristol City	2004–05	League One	3	0	0	0	1	0	0	0	4	0
Bristol City	2005–06	League One	37	1	—		0	0	1	0	38	1
Bristol City	2006–07	League One	11	0	3	0	0	0	2	0	16	0
Bristol City	Total		90	1	6	0	3	0	13	0	112	1
Mansfield Town (loan)	2004–05	League Two	8	1	0	0	0	0	1	0	9	1
Torquay United (loan)	2004–05	League One	22	1	0	0	0	0	0	0	22	1
Torquay United (loan)	2005–06	League Two	2	0	2	0	—		0	0	4	0
Torquay United (loan)	Total		24	1	2	0	0	0	0	0	26	1
Wycombe Wanderers	2007–08	League Two	29	0	0	0	1	0	3 (Note: One appearance in Football League Trophy, two appearances in Football League Two play-offs)	0	33	0
Wycombe Wanderers	2008–09	League Two	46	1	2	0	1	0	1	0	50	1
Wycombe Wanderers	2009–10	League Two	44	1	2	0	1	0	1	0	48	1
Wycombe Wanderers	Total		119	2	4	0	3	0	5	0	131	2
Brentford	2010–11	League One	41	1	2	0	4	1	7	0	54	2
Brentford	2011–12	League One	18	0	1	0	0	0	3	0	22	0
Brentford	Total		59	1	3	0	4	1	10	0	76	2
Exeter City	2012–13	League Two	44	0	1	0	0	0	1	0	46	0
Exeter City	2013–14	League Two	41	1	1	0	1	0	1	0	44	1
Exeter City	2014–15	League Two	32	0	1	0	1	0	0	0	34	0
Exeter City	2015–16	League Two	25	0	3	0	1	0	1	0	30	0
Exeter City	2016–17	League Two	33	0	1	0	1	0	4 (Note: One appearance in EFL Trophy, three appearances in EFL League Two play-offs)	0	39	0
Exeter City	2017–18	League Two	33	0	2	0	0	0	3 (Note: Two appearances in EFL Trophy, one appearance in EFL League Two play-offs)	0	38	0
Exeter City	2018–19	League Two	32	0	1	0	1	0	2	0	36	0
Exeter City	2019–20	League Two	6	0	2	0	1	0	3	0	12	0
Exeter City	Total		246	1	12	0	6	0	15	0	274	1
Tiverton Town	2020–21	Southern League Premier Division South	7	0	2	0	0	0	1 (Note: Appearances in FA Trophy)	0	10	0
Tiverton Town	2021–22	Southern League Premier Division South	32	0	0	0	1	0	5 (Note: Three appearances in FA Trophy, two appearances in Devon St Luke's Bowl)	0	38	0
Tiverton Town	2022–23	Southern League Premier Division South	26	0	0	0	0	0	5 (Note: Four appearances in Devon St Luke's Bowl, one appearance in FA Trophy)	0	31	0
Tiverton Town	2023–24	Southern League Premier Division South	3	0	0	0	0	0	0	0	3	0
Tiverton Town	Total		68	0	2	0	1	0	11	0	82	0
Willand Rovers	2023–24	Southern League First Division South	5	0	0	0	—		1 (Note: Appearance in Devon St Luke's Bowl)	0	6	0
Bridgwater United	2024–25	Western League Premier Division	3	0	—		—		—		3	0
Cullompton Rangers	2024–25	South West Peninsula League Premier Division East	9	0	—		3	0	—		12	0
Cullompton Rangers	2025–26	South West Peninsula League Premier Division East	5	0	0	0	0	0	0	0	0	0
Cullompton Rangers	Total		14	0	0	0	3	0	0	0	12	0
Career total			530	7	24	0	16	1	39	0	601	8

== Honours ==
Wycombe Wanderers

- Football League Two third-place promotion: 2008–09

Brentford

- Football League Trophy runner-up: 2010–11

Tiverton Town

- Devon St Luke's Bowl: 2022–23
