= Simon Moore (footballer) =

English footballer (born 1990)

- Moore in 2026

Personal information
- Full name: Simon William Moore
- Date of birth: 19 May 1990 (age 36)
- Place of birth: Sandown, England
- Height: 6 ft 3 in (1.91 m)
- Position: Goalkeeper

Team information
- Current team: Sunderland
- Number: 21

Youth career
- Brading Town
- Southampton
- 2004–2006: Brading Town

Senior career*
Years	Team	Apps	(Gls)
2006–2008	Brading Town	47	(0)
2008–2009	Farnborough		
2009–2013	Brentford	64	(0)
2010–2011	→ Basingstoke Town (loan)	7	(0)
2013–2016	Cardiff City	17	(0)
2014	→ Bristol City (loan)	11	(0)
2016–2021	Sheffield United	63	(0)
2021–2024	Coventry City	44	(0)
2024–	Sunderland	4	(0)

International career
2009	Isle of Wight	5	(0)
- * Club domestic league appearances and goals as of 15:52, 9 November 2024 (UTC)

Simon William Moore (born 19 May 1990) is an English professional footballer who plays as a goalkeeper for Premier League club Sunderland.

After playing in Southampton's academy, he started his senior career with Isle of Wight based club Brading Town, and after a spell with Farnborough, he joined Football League One club Brentford in 2009. After a loan spell with Basingstoke Town during the 2010–11 season, he became first choice goalkeeper at Brentford for the 2012–13 season. He signed for Premier League club Cardiff City in summer 2013, though made just 25 appearances over three years at the club. He also had a loan spell with Bristol City in 2014. In summer 2016, he joined League One club Sheffield United and was named in the PFA League One Team of the Season in his debut season at the club as they were promoted to the Championship. He lost his place as first-choice goalkeeper at the club following this, and made 20 league appearances over his following four years at the club. He transferred to Coventry City in 2021 and joined current club Sunderland in 2024.

== Club career ==
=== Early career ===
Born in Sandown on the Isle of Wight, Moore started at Brading Town, before signing for the academy of Premier League side Southampton. Moore said he was released by the club for being too small. He returned to Isle of Wight based side Brading Town where his father was manager, making his first team debut at just 16 years old. He subsequently joined Farnborough.

=== Brentford ===
Moore taking a goalkeeper for Brentford during a match against Chelsea on 17 February 2013.

Moore signed with Brentford in August 2009 after spending the summer at the club on trial, but had to wait until May 2010 to make his debut, when he appeared against Hartlepool United as a substitute for regular number one goalkeeper Wojciech Szczęsny.

He was loaned out in October 2010 to Basingstoke Town and played until January 2011, in 10 games for the club.

The 2012–13 season was Moore's breakthrough season at Brentford. He started the season as an understudy to goalkeeper Richard Lee. During Lee's time out injured Moore put in some good performances and cemented his place in the Brentford team under Uwe Rösler. He helped Brentford reach the FA Cup fourth round, this included a 2–2 draw with European Champions Chelsea, and finish third in the league missing out on promotion on the final day of the season after a dramatic game with Doncaster Rovers. Brentford entered the play-offs, where they were drawn in the semi-final against Swindon Town. Brentford reached the playoff final defeating Swindon in the semi-finals on penalties (Moore saved Miles Storeys' spotkick in the shootout), but they lost the final to Yeovil Town 2–1.

=== Cardiff City ===
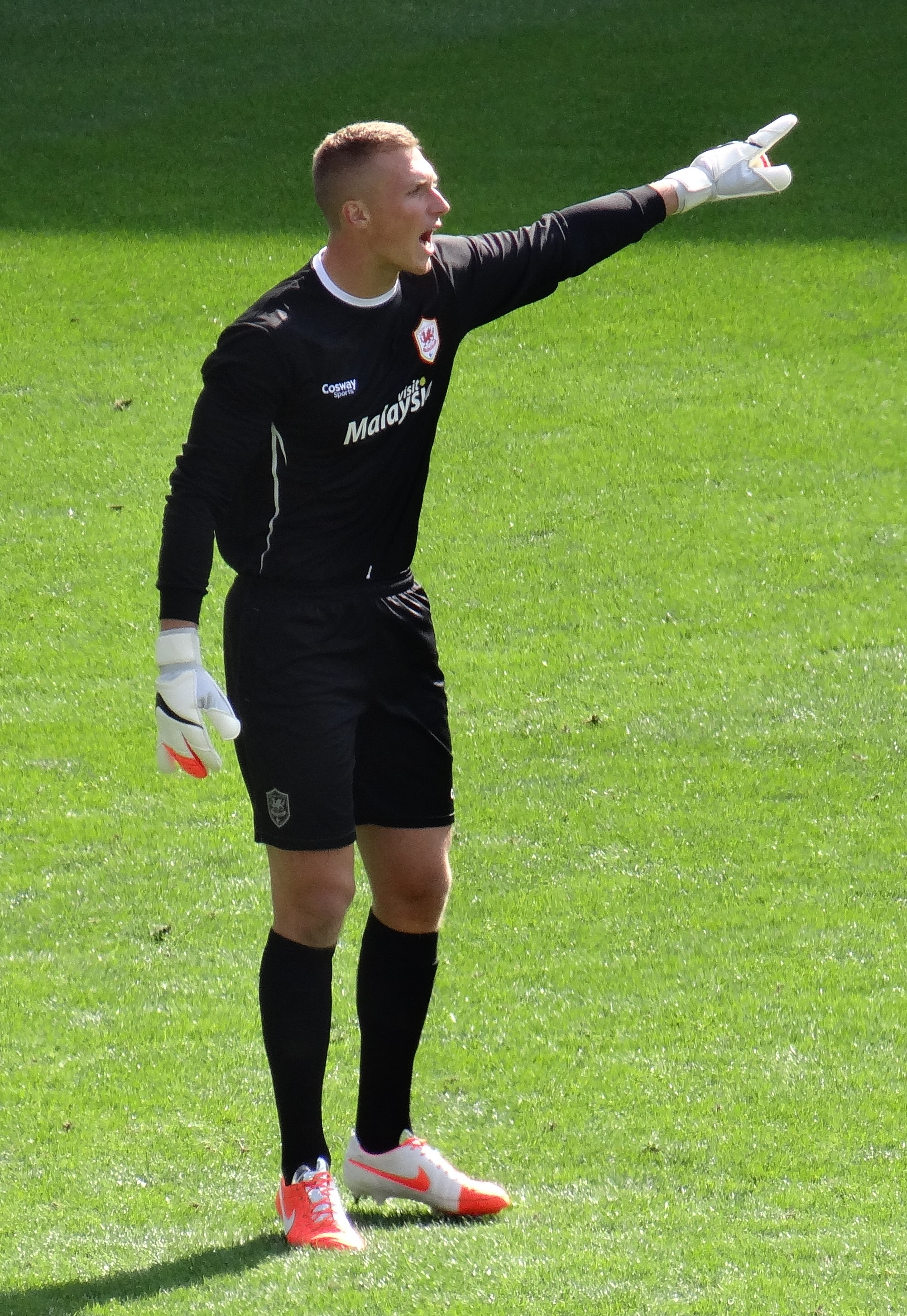
Moore playing for Cardiff City in 2014

On 29 July 2013, Moore was signed by Malky Mackay a four-year deal with newly promoted Premier League side Cardiff City. After failing to displace David Marshall, Moore was sent out on loan to Bristol City for the rest of the season on 30 January 2014, not long after new manager Ole Gunnar Solskjær took charge of Cardiff. He made his debut on 1 February in a 2–1 win against Carlisle United, going on to make 11 appearances for the side. Whilst out on loan to Bristol City, Cardiff were relegated from the Premier League.

Moore had to wait until the following season, 2014–15, to make his debut for Cardiff City in a 2–1 victory away to Coventry City in the League Cup. He made his league debut for Cardiff City keeping a clean sheet in a 1–0 victory in the Championship at home to Fulham on 10 January 2015. Towards the end of the 2014–15 season, Moore had a regular run of games for Cardiff under manager Russell Slade, including an impressive performance in a 2–1 victory against his old club Brentford.

Moore started the 2015–16, due to the suspension of David Marshall. He gifted Fulham their opening goal in a 1–1 game on the opening day but was praised the following game against Queens Park Rangers, where he put in a man of the match performance.

=== Sheffield United ===
In August 2016, Moore entered talks with League One club Sheffield United over a move, worth around £500,000. He signed a three-year contract with the club on 19 August. He made 45 appearances for Sheffield United in his debut season, and was named in the PFA League One Team of the Year for 2016–17 after winning promotion with Sheffield United.

He lost his starting spot at the start of the 2017–18 season, with Jamal Blackman starting the season as first-choice after Moore suffered a knee injury during pre-season. He made his appearance of the season on 31 October 2017 as a 10th-minute substitute in a 1–0 defeat to Queens Park Rangers, after Blackman suffered a back injury. He made 18 Championship appearances in total across the 2017–18 season, 10 of which came in a run of starts between 8 December and 3 February.

He signed a new three-year contract with the club in July 2018. He was back-up to Dean Henderson during the 2018–19 and 2019–20 seasons. Moore did not play in the league during the former as Sheffield United were promoted to the Premier League, and he made two league appearances in the latter against Manchester United as Henderson was unable to play against them under the terms of his loan deal. He was not registered in Sheffield United's Premier League squad for the first half of the 2020–21 season after suffering a ruptured ligament in his hand in September 2020, and he was released by the club at the end of the season, having failed to play in his final year at the club.

=== Coventry City ===
In July 2021, Moore joined Coventry City on a three-year deal. He established himself as the club's first-choice goalkeeper in his debut season at the club, in which he made 42 appearances. However, he was dropped after three league appearances in the 2022–23 season, following a series of mistakes, and became backup to Ben Wilson. He played just once more following this during the 2022–23 season, starting in a 4–3 FA Cup defeat to Wrexham. Manager Robins was critical of Moore's performance, stating that it's "not acceptable" to concede four goals at home. He did not play for the club during the 2023–24 season and on 9 May 2024, the club said Moore would be released in the summer when his contract expired.

=== Sunderland ===
On 21 June 2024, Moore agreed to join Championship side Sunderland on a two-year deal with the option for a further season. He made his first league appearance on 26 October 2024 against Oxford United.

== International career ==
Moore played for the Isle of Wight in the 2009 Island Games.

== Personal life ==
Moore is the brother of Wycombe Wanderers goalkeeper Stuart Moore. Their father and grandfather were also goalkeepers.

== Career statistics ==
As of match played on 11 January 2025

Appearances and goals by club, season and competition
Club	Season	League			FA Cup		League Cup		Europe		Other		Total	
Club	Season	Division	Apps	Goals	Apps	Goals	Apps	Goals	Apps	Goals	Apps	Goals	Apps	Goals
Brading Town	2006–07	Wessex League Premier Division	4	0	—		—		—		—		4	0
Brading Town	2007–08	Wessex League Premier Division	37	0	—		—		—		2 (Note: Appearances in Wessex League Cup)	0	39	0
Brading Town	2008–09	Wessex League Premier Division	6	0	0	0	—		—		0	0	6	0
Brading Town	Total		47	0	0	0	—		—		2	0	49	0
Brentford	2009–10	League One	1	0	0	0	0	0	—		0	0	1	0
Brentford	2010–11	League One	10	0	—		1	0	—		1 (Note: Appearances Football League Trophy)	0	12	0
Brentford	2011–12	League One	10	0	0	0	1	0	—		1	0	12	0
Brentford	2012–13	League One	43	0	4	0	1	0	—		4 (Note: One appearance in Football League Trophy, three appearances in League One play-offs)	0	52	0
Brentford	Total		64	0	4	0	3	0	—		6	0	77	0
Basingstoke Town (loan)	2010–11	Conference South	7	0	1	0	—		—		2 (Note: Appearances in FA Trophy)	0	10	0
Cardiff City	2013–14	Premier League	0	0	0	0	0	0	—		—		0	0
Cardiff City	2014–15	Championship	10	0	2	0	3	0	—		—		15	0
Cardiff City	2015–16	Championship	7	0	1	0	1	0	—		—		9	0
Cardiff City	2016–17	Championship	0	0	—		1	0	—		—		1	0
Cardiff City	Total		17	0	3	0	5	0	—		—		25	0
Bristol City (loan)	2013–14	League One	11	0	—		—		—		—		11	0
Sheffield United	2016–17	League One	43	0	0	0	—		—		2	0	45	0
Sheffield United	2017–18	Championship	18	0	1	0	0	0	—		—		19	0
Sheffield United	2018–19	Championship	0	0	1	0	1	0	—		—		2	0
Sheffield United	2019–20	Premier League	2	0	0	0	2	0	—		—		4	0
Sheffield United	2020–21	Premier League	0	0	0	0	0	0	—		—		0	0
Sheffield United	Total		63	0	2	0	3	0	—		2	0	70	0
Coventry City	2021–22	Championship	41	0	1	0	0	0	—		—		42	0
Coventry City	2022–23	Championship	3	0	1	0	0	0	—		0	0	4	0
Coventry City	2023–24	Championship	0	0	0	0	0	0	—		—		0	0
Coventry City	Total		44	0	2	0	0	0	—		0	0	46	0
Sunderland	2024–25	Championship	4	0	1	0	1	0	—		0	0	6	0
Sunderland	2025–26	Premier League	0	0	0	0	0	0	—		—		0	0
Sunderland	2026–27	Premier League	0	0	0	0	0	0	0	0	—		0	0
Sunderland	Total		4	0	1	0	1	0	0	0	0	0	6	0
Career total			257	0	13	0	12	0	0	0	12	0	294	0

== Honours ==
Brentford

- Football League Trophy runner-up: 2010–11

Sheffield United

- EFL League One: 2016–17

Sunderland

- EFL Championship play-offs: 2025

Individual

- PFA Team of the Year: 2016–17 League One
