= Robbie Simpson =

English footballer (born 1985)

Personal information
- Full name: Robbie Simpson
- Date of birth: 15 March 1985 (age 41)
- Place of birth: Poole, England
- Position: Forward

Youth career
- 1995–2002: Norwich City

Senior career*
Years	Team	Apps	(Gls)
2002–2006	Cambridge City	118	(33)
2006–2007	Cambridge United	33	(17)
2007–2009	Coventry City	61	(4)
2009–2012	Huddersfield Town	13	(0)
2010–2011	→ Brentford (loan)	27	(4)
2011	→ Oldham Athletic (loan)	14	(3)
2012	→ Oldham Athletic (loan)	2	(0)
2012–2013	Oldham Athletic	50	(5)
2013–2014	Leyton Orient	14	(0)
2014–2016	Cambridge United	67	(12)
2016–2018	Exeter City	37	(3)
2018–2019	Milton Keynes Dons	21	(2)
2019–2023	Chelmsford City	21	(4)
Total		478	(87)

Managerial career
- 2020–2025: Chelmsford City
- * Club domestic league appearances and goals as of 16:00, 26 August 2022 (UTC)

Robbie Simpson (born 15 March 1985 in Poole, Dorset) is an English former professional footballer who played as a forward.

His previous clubs include Cambridge City, Cambridge United, Coventry City, Huddersfield Town, Brentford, Oldham Athletic, Leyton Orient, Exeter City and Milton Keynes Dons.

== Playing career ==
=== Norwich City ===
Simpson began his footballing career with Norwich City at the age of nine where he spent six years on schoolboy terms. He was signed by Jez George, then head of youth development at Cambridge City, following his release by Norwich.

=== Cambridge City ===
Simpson went to Stanborough School in Welwyn Garden City until he was 16. Whilst playing for Cambridge City, Simpson obtained good A-levels, and decided to follow this by studying for a degree in Sports Science and Mathematics at Loughborough University (graduating in 2007) whilst remaining tied to the club though coaching in their 'Youth in the Community' scheme. Robbie won the British Universities Sport Association trophy all three years when he was there playing for the student team, now Loughborough University F.C.

Simpson made his first team debut for Cambridge City in October 2002. He made 154 appearances and scored 42 goals over five seasons with the Lilywhites.

When City offered him terms of re-engagement at the end of 2005/06, it was discovered that his original contract had been secretly amended in February 2006 by Jez George. The effect was to allow Simpson and two other players (Josh Simpson and Michael Gash) a free transfer at the end of the season, instead of the usual position where City would have been entitled to a fee under the Bosman ruling requirements for players under the age of 24. The contract amendments were discovered by new Directors (from the Cambridge City Supporters Trust) who had taken over after George and other Directors resigned amidst wider accusations of financial impropriety, which were later to lead to a High Court case. George subsequently moved to Cambridge United and City received no compensation for the three players.

=== Cambridge United ===
Simpson signed for Cambridge United in June 2006. Despite an inauspicious start to his United career, hampered by studying full-time in Loughborough and a knee injury, he eventually became a fans' favourite due to his all-action style and goal scoring ability. By the end of the 2006–07 season he had 17 goals from 33 appearances, 15 of which came in the second half of the season. The end of the season saw Simpson win a multitude of club awards, including the Supporters' Player of the Year, Cambridge Evening News Player of the Year and official website goal of the season. Although Cambridge offered Simpson a new contract at the end of the season, this was turned down amid interest from a number of larger clubs.

=== Coventry City ===
Simpson joined Coventry City at the start of the 2007–08 season along with a host of other new players for the Sky Blues, and was immediately touted as a future star by manager Iain Dowie.

Simpson scored five minutes into his competitive debut for the club in a League Cup tie against Notts County on 14 August 2007. Ex-Coventry assistant manager Tim Flowers praised the youngster's performance, describing his acquisition from Cambridge as "a bargain" and tipping him to be a success at the club.

=== Huddersfield Town ===
On 18 June 2009, after intensive speculation, Simpson joined League One side Huddersfield Town for a fee believed to be around £300,000 on a three-year deal. He made his debut in the 2–2 draw against Southend United at Roots Hall on 8 August 2009. On 1 September 2009, he scored his first goal for the Terriers, the second goal in Town's 2–1 win over Rotherham United in the Football League Trophy. Most of Simpson's first season with the Terriers was disrupted by injury.

==== Brentford (loan) ====
Simpson joined Brentford on loan for the entire 2010–11 season on 6 August 2010, making 18 starts, scoring 8 goals.

==== Oldham Athletic (loan) ====
After being isolated from the Huddersfield squad at the start of the following season, Simpson joined Oldham Athletic on loan on 10 September 2011. Simpson made his debut for the club coming on as a substitute at the start of the second half against Stevenage. Simpson scored his first goal for the club on his 13th appearance, with a free kick that was fumbled by the Burton Albion goalkeeper in a 3–1 win for the Latics in the first round of the FA Cup. Simpson scored a hat-trick the following game in a League One game against Chesterfield in a 5–2 win for the Latics.

His loan ended on 12 December 2011, but Huddersfield allowed him to stay there in a training capacity and he later signed on loan until the end of the season with a view to a permanent move. He signed just in time to play against Chesterfield in a 1–1 draw, Matt Smith scoring the equaliser. Simpson's permanent move was pretty much completed in the same week, Simpson himself stating that he is close to completing the move on Twitter, as well as Paul Dickov and Lee Clark both stating that the permanent deal was near completion. On 6 January 2012, Simpson scored a spectacular volleyed strike from 25 yards against Premier League Liverpool in an FA Cup 3rd Round encounter. The lead lasted just 67 seconds before Jonjo Shelvey's shot deflected off of Craig Bellamy and into the net. Liverpool went on to win the game 5–1.

=== Oldham Athletic ===
On 30 January 2012, Simpson joined the club on a permanent deal until the end of the season. At the end of the 2012–13 season, Simpson was released by the club along with 4 other players.

=== Leyton Orient ===
On 11 November 2013, Simpson joined League One club Leyton Orient on a two-month deal. His contract was extended to the end of the season, but he was unable to score during his time at the club. At the end of the season, after appearing on the bench for the 2014 Football League One play-off final, he was released by Orient along with four other players.

=== Cambridge United ===
On 9 June 2014, Simpson re-joined newly promoted League Two side Cambridge United on a two-year deal. Simpson left Cambridge United by mutual consent at the end of the 2015–16 season.

=== Exeter City ===
On 25 May 2016 Simpson signed with League Two club Exeter City. He was released by Exeter at the end of the 2017–18 season.

=== Milton Keynes Dons ===
On 9 July 2018, Simpson signed a short-term deal to join newly-relegated League Two club Milton Keynes Dons. He scored his first goal for the club within a minute of coming on as a second-half substitute in a 1–1 home league fixture against Grimsby Town on 21 August 2018. On 22 November 2018 manager Paul Tisdale revealed Simpson's contract with the club had been extended until the end of the season. Simpson was later one of ten players released by the club at the end of the 2018–19 season.

=== Chelmsford City ===
On 15 August 2019, Simpson signed for National League South club Chelmsford City.

== Managerial career ==
On 30 January 2020, Simpson was confirmed as interim manager of Chelmsford following the sacking of Rod Stringer. On 11 March 2020, Simpson was appointed manager of Chelmsford City on a permanent basis. On 11 January 2025, Simpson confirmed he would be stepping down as manager of Chelmsford at the end of the 2024–25 season and subsequently retiring from management.

== Career statistics ==
As of match played 21 December 2019

Appearances and goals by club, season and competition
Club	Season	Division	League		FA Cup		League Cup		Other		Total	
Club	Season	Division	Apps	Goals	Apps	Goals	Apps	Goals	Apps	Goals	Apps	Goals
Cambridge City	2001–02	Southern League Premier Division	0	0	0	0	—		1 (Note: Appearances in FA Trophy)	0	1	0
Cambridge City	2002–03	Southern League Premier Division	22	8	0	0	—		4 (Note: Two appearances in Cambridgeshire Invitation Cup, one appearance and one goal in Southern League Cup, one appearance in FA Trophy)	1	26	9
Cambridge City	2003–04	Southern League Premier Division	35	6	3	1	—		8 (Note: Five appearances and one goal in Southern League Cup, two appearances in FA Trophy, one appearance in Cambridgeshire Invitation Cup)	1	46	8
Cambridge City	2004–05	Conference South	22	8	5	1	—		7 (Note: Five appearances and three goals in FA Trophy, one appearance and one goal in Cambridgeshire Invitation Cup, one appearance in Conference South play-offs)	4	34	13
Cambridge City	2005–06	Conference South	39	11	4	0	—		4	1	47	12
Cambridge City	Total		118	33	12	2	—		24	7	154	42
Cambridge United	2006–07	Conference National	33	17	1	0	—		1	0	35	17
Coventry City	2007–08	Championship	28	1	2	0	4	1	—		34	2
Coventry City	2008–09	Championship	33	3	2	0	2	2	—		37	5
Coventry City	Total		61	4	4	0	6	3	—		71	7
Huddersfield Town	2009–10	League One	13	0	0	0	2	0	1 (Note: Appearances in EFL Trophy)	1	16	1
Huddersfield Town	2010–11	League One	0	0	—		—		—		0	0
Huddersfield Town	2011–12	League One	0	0	—		0	0	—		0	0
Huddersfield Town	Total		13	0	0	0	2	0	1	1	16	1
Brentford (loan)	2010–11	League One	27	4	2	0	3	2	4	2	36	8
Oldham Athletic	2011–12	League One	29	6	3	2	—		4	1	36	9
Oldham Athletic	2012–13	League One	37	2	5	2	1	0	1	0	44	4
Oldham Athletic	Total		66	8	8	4	1	0	5	1	80	13
Leyton Orient	2013–14	League One	14	0	1	0	0	0	1	0	16	0
Cambridge United	2014–15	League Two	35	8	4	1	1	0	1	0	41	9
Cambridge United	2015–16	League Two	32	4	2	0	1	0	1	0	36	4
Cambridge United	Total		100	29	7	1	2	0	3	0	112	30
Exeter City	2016–17	League Two	26	1	1	0	1	0	1	0	29	1
Exeter City	2017–18	League Two	11	2	0	0	0	0	2 (Note: Appearances in League Two play-offs)	0	13	2
Exeter City	Total		37	3	1	0	1	0	3	0	42	3
Milton Keynes Dons	2018–19	League Two	21	2	1	0	0	0	2	0	24	2
Chelmsford City	2019–20	National League South	15	4	1	0	—		4 (Note: Three appearances and one goal in FA Trophy, one appearance in Essex Senior Cup)	1	20	5
Chelmsford City	2020–21	National League South	4	0	0	0	—		0	0	4	
Chelmsford City	Total		19	4	1	0	—		4	1	24	5
Career total			476	87	37	7	15	5	47	12	575	111

== Honours ==
=== As a player ===
Milton Keynes Dons

- EFL League Two third-place promotion: 2018–19

=== As a manager ===
Individual

- National League South Manager of the Month: January 2024, September 2024
