= 2006–07 Brentford F.C. season =

English football team season

Brentford
2006–07 season
- Chairman: Greg Dyke
- Manager: Leroy Rosenior (until 18 November 2006); Scott B. Fitzgerald (18 November 2006 – 10 April 2007); Barry Quin (from 10 April 2007)
- Stadium: Griffin Park
- League One: 24th (relegated)
- FA Cup: First round
- League Cup: Second round
- Football League Trophy: Second round
- Top goalscorer: League: Kuffour (12); All: Kuffour (14)
- Highest home attendance: 7,023
- Lowest home attendance: 4,296
- Average home league attendance: 5,600
Home colours	Away colours

During the 2006–07 English football season, Brentford competed in Football League One. The club finished bottom of the league and was relegated to Football League Two.

== Season summary ==
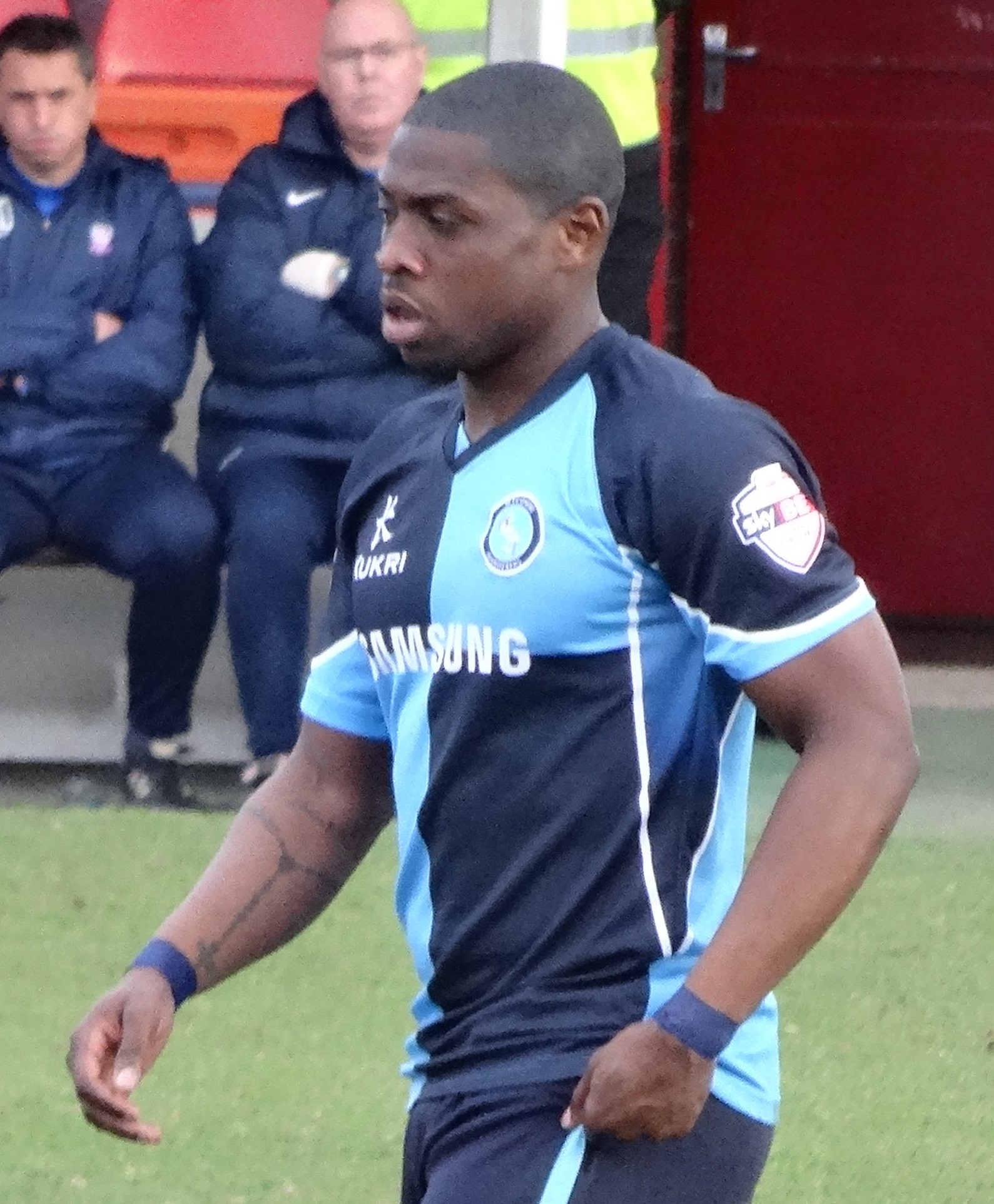
Jo Kuffour top-scored in his single season with Brentford.

After defeat in the 2006 League One play-off semi-finals, Brentford were rocked by the resignation of popular manager Martin Allen on 30 May 2006, who stated he "had taken the club as far as I could and felt it was right for me to leave". Chairman Greg Dyke revealed that, despite an FA Cup run and the £500,000 sale of forward DJ Campbell during 2005–06 season, Allen's departure was due to the reduction of the cash-strapped club's wage budget for 2006–07. Chief scout John Griffin handled first team affairs until the appointment of Leroy Rosenior as manager on 14 June. Despite the off-season sales of star players Jay Tabb, Michael Turner and Sam Sodje generating upwards of £1,000,000, Rosenior was forced to bring in players on free transfers. A new spine for the team was assembled from central defenders Adam Griffiths and Matthew Heywood, midfielder Thomas Pinault and forwards Jo Kuffour and Chris Moore. Goalkeeper Stuart Nelson, full backs Andy Frampton and Kevin O'Connor, midfielders Ólafur Ingi Skúlason, Paul Brooker, Alex Rhodes and forwards Lloyd Owusu and Calum Willock remained from the previous season's squad, though Owusu would miss much of the campaign with a groin injury.

Brentford enjoyed a good start to the season, going undefeated in eight matches and rising as high as fourth in the table. A 2–0 league defeat to Swansea City on 12 September began a sharp downturn in fortunes, with injuries to eight senior players forcing Rosenior to turn to inexperienced youngsters John Mousinho, Clark Masters, Darius Charles, Ryan Peters, Karleigh Osborne and Karle Carder-Andrews. After injury to Calum Willock and a loss of form from Chris Moore, incoming forwards Clyde Wijnhard and Fola Onibuje failed to readdress the team's goalscoring problems. After a winless run of 16 games which dropped Brentford into the League One relegation zone, Leroy Rosenior was sacked as manager after a 4–0 home defeat to Crewe Alexandra on 18 November.

Youth team manager Scott B. Fitzgerald took over as caretaker manager and was later given the job on a permanent basis until the end of the season. Off the field there was a glimmer of hope in January 2007, when supporter Matthew Benham paid out nearly £3 million to take over some of the club's loans. Despite a clear-out of the squad, an influx of new signings and an additional goal threat from emerging youngster Charlie Ide, rookie manager Fitzgerald fared little better than his predecessor, winning just four of 24 matches before his departure after Brentford's relegation was confirmed on 9 April. Head of Youth Barry Quin took caretaker charge for the final four matches of the season and despite a first win in over two months, Brentford finished the campaign bottom of League One.

As of April 2026, 2006–07 is the only season in which Brentford has finished bottom of a division of the Football League. The club finished with the worst away, overall attacking, overall defensive and home defensive records in League One, in addition to the lowest overall and lowest home goal differences. Club records set during the season included those of:

- Fewest Football League wins in a season: 8
- Fewest Football League home wins in a season: 5 (tied with 1946–47)
- Most home Football League goals conceded in a season: 41
- Lowest negative home goal difference in a Football League season: -17
- Fewest points in a Football League season (3 points for a win): 37
- Lowest winning percentage in a Football League season: 17.39%
- Lowest winning percentage in a Football League season (all competitions): 15.686% (Note: "All competitions" comprises Football League, FA Cup, Football League Cup and Football League Trophy.)

== League table ==
Pos	Team	Pld	W	D	L	GF	GA	GD	Pts	Promotion, qualification or relegation
20	Leyton Orient	46	12	15	19	61	77	−16	51	
21	Chesterfield (R)	46	12	11	23	45	53	−8	47	Relegation to Football League Two
22	Bradford City (R)	46	11	14	21	47	65	−18	47	Relegation to Football League Two
23	Rotherham United (R)	46	13	9	24	58	75	−17	38 (Note: Rotherham United had 10 points deducted for entering financial administration.)	Relegation to Football League Two
24	Brentford (R)	46	8	13	25	40	79	−39	37	Relegation to Football League Two

Rules for classification: In the Football League goals scored (GF) takes precedence over goal difference (GD).
(R) Relegated

== Results ==
Brentford's goal tally listed first.

=== Legend ===
Win	Draw	Loss

=== Pre-season and friendlies ===
Date	Opponent	Venue	Result	Attendance	Scorer(s)
8 July 2006	Staines Town	A	1–3	1,249	Rhodes
13 July 2006	Ilfracombe Town	A	6–0	250	Standing, Brooker, Moore, Griffiths, Willock, Fitzgerald
15 August 2006	Bideford AFC	A	0–0	n/a	
19 July 2006	Yeading	A	2–2	n/a	Trialist, Moore (pen)
22 July 2006	Hampton & Richmond Borough	A	1–0	n/a	Tomlin
25 July 2006	Basingstoke Town	A	1–0	n/a	O'Connor (pen)
28 July 2006	Crawley Town	A	0–0	n/a	
31 July 2006	Harrow Borough	A	3–0	5,420	Ide, Trialist, Dimitrov
October 2006	Hampton & Richmond Borough	A	1–1	301	Tomlin

=== Football League One ===
No.	Date	Opponent	Venue	Result	Attendance	Scorer(s)	Notes
1	5 August 2006	Blackpool	H	1–0	6,048	Skúlason	
2	8 August 2006	Northampton Town	A	1–0	5,707	Moore	
3	12 August 2006	Brighton & Hove Albion	A	2–2	6,745	O'Connor, Moore	
4	19 August 2006	Huddersfield Town	H	2–2	5,709	Kuffour (2)	
5	26 August 2006	Scunthorpe United	A	1–1	3,942	Kuffour	
6	2 September 2006	Bradford City	H	2–1	5,471	O'Connor, Kuffour	
7	9 September 2006	Leyton Orient	A	1–1	5,420	Tillen	
8	12 September 2006	Swansea City	H	0–2	5,392		
9	16 September 2006	Bournemouth	H	0–0	6,272		
10	23 September 2006	Chesterfield	A	1–3	3,877	Griffiths	
11	26 September 2006	Millwall	A	1–1	7,618	Willock	
12	30 September 2006	Yeovil Town	H	1–2	5,770	Kuffour	
13	7 October 2006	Bristol City	H	1–1	6,740	O'Connor (pen)	
14	14 October 2006	Rotherham United	A	0–2	4,722		
15	21 October 2006	Gillingham	H	2–2	5,759	Heywood, Willock	
16	28 October 2006	Oldham Athletic	A	0–3	4,708		
17	4 November 2006	Nottingham Forest	A	0–2	18,003		
18	18 November 2006	Crewe Alexandra	H	0–4	4,771		
19	24 November 2006	Cheltenham Town	A	0–2	3,646		
20	5 December 2006	Doncaster Rovers	H	0–4	4,296		
21	9 December 2006	Tranmere Rovers	H	1–1	4,878	Ide	
22	16 December 2006	Port Vale	A	0–1	4,166		
23	23 December 2006	Carlisle United	A	0–2	6,805		
24	26 December 2006	Millwall	H	1–4	6,925	O'Connor (pen)	
25	30 December 2006	Chesterfield	H	2–1	4,540	Kuffour (2)	
26	1 January 2007	Swansea City	H	0–2	12,554		
27	6 January 2007	Bournemouth	A	0–1	5,782		
28	13 January 2007	Leyton Orient	H	2–2	6,765	Ide (2)	
29	20 January 2007	Yeovil Town	A	0–1	5,373		
30	27 January 2007	Carlisle United	H	0–0	5,381		
31	3 February 2007	Blackpool	A	3–1	6,086	Frampton, Kuffour (2)	
32	10 February 2007	Brighton & Hove Albion	H	1–0	7,023	Kuffour	
33	17 February 2007	Huddersfield Town	A	2–0	10,520	Ide, Kuffour	
34	19 February 2007	Northampton Town	H	0–1	5,164		
35	24 February 2007	Bradford City	A	1–1	7,627	O'Connor (pen)	
36	3 March 2007	Scunthorpe United	H	0–2	5,645		
37	10 March 2007	Bristol City	A	0–1	11,826		
38	17 March 2007	Rotherham United	H	0–1	4,937		
39	25 March 2007	Oldham Athletic	H	2–2	4,720	Richards, Keith	
40	31 March 2007	Gillingham	A	1–2	6,113	Kuffour	
41	7 April 2007	Cheltenham Town	H	0–2	4,831	Owusu	
42	9 April 2007	Crewe Alexandra	A	1–3	4,667	O'Connor (pen)	
43	14 April 2007	Nottingham Forest	H	2–4	6,637	Pinault, Ide	
44	21 April 2007	Doncaster Rovers	A	0–3	8,713		
45	28 April 2007	Port Vale	H	4–3	5,125	Ide (2), Keith (pen), Charles	(Note: Brentford wore the upcoming 2007–08 season's away colours.)
46	5 May 2007	Tranmere Rovers	A	1–3	6,529	Willock	

=== FA Cup ===
Round	Date	Opponent	Venue	Result	Attendance
R1	11 November 2006	Doncaster Rovers	H	0–1	3,607

=== Football League Cup ===
Round	Date	Opponent	Venue	Result	Attendance	Scorer(s)
R1	22 August 2006	Swindon Town	A	2–2 (a.e.t.), won 4–3 on pens)	5,582	O'Connor, Kuffour
R2	19 September 2006	Luton Town	H	0–3	3,005	

=== Football League Trophy ===
Round	Date	Opponent	Venue	Result	Attendance	Scorer(s)
SR1	17 October 2006	Northampton Town	A	0–0 (a.e.t.), won 4–2 on pens)	2,088	
SR2	31 October 2006	Nottingham Forest	A	1–2	2,031	Kuffour

- Sources: Soccerbase, 11v11

== Playing squad ==
Players' ages are as of the opening day of the 2006–07 season.

No	Position	Name	Nationality	Date of birth (age)	Signed from	Signed in	Notes
Goalkeepers
1	GK	Stuart Nelson	(England)	17 September 1981 (aged 24)	Hucknall Town	2004	
21	GK	Clark Masters	(England)	31 May 1987 (aged 19)	Youth	2005	Loaned to AFC Wimbledon
26	GK	Seb Brown	(England)	24 November 1989 (aged 16)	Youth	2006	
28	GK	Nathan Abbey	(England)	11 July 1978 (aged 28)	Torquay United	2006	Loaned from Torquay United before transferring permanently
Defenders
2	DF	Kevin O'Connor (c)	(Republic of Ireland)	24 February 1982 (aged 24)	Youth	2000	
3	DF	Andy Frampton	(England)	3 September 1979 (aged 26)	Crystal Palace	2002	
5	DF	Matthew Heywood	(England)	26 August 1979 (aged 26)	Bristol City	2006	Loaned from Bristol City before transferring permanently
6	DF	Adam Griffiths	(Australia)	21 August 1979 (aged 26)	Bournemouth	2006	
16	DF	Joe Keith	(England)	1 October 1978 (aged 27)	Leyton Orient	2007	
18	DF	Sam Tillen	(England)	16 April 1985 (aged 21)	Chelsea	2005	
23	DF	Darius Charles	(England)	10 December 1987 (aged 18)	Youth	2004	Loaned to Staines Town and Crawley Town
24	DF	Karleigh Osborne	(England)	19 March 1988 (aged 18)	Youth	2004	
35	DF	Bradley Falco	(England)	18 September 1989 (aged 16)	Youth	2007	
Midfielders
4	MF	Thomas Pinault	(France)	4 December 1981 (aged 24)	Unattached	2006	
7	MF	Paul Brooker	(England)	25 November 1976 (aged 29)	Reading	2005	
14	MF	Karle Carder-Andrews	(England)	13 March 1989 (aged 17)	Youth	2006	
17	MF	Alex Rhodes	(England)	23 January 1982 (aged 24)	Newmarket Town	2003	Loaned to Swindon Town and Grays Athletic
20	MF	Ryan Peters	(England)	21 August 1987 (aged 18)	Youth	2004	Loaned to Crawley Town and AFC Wimbledon
22	MF	John Mousinho	(England)	30 April 1986 (aged 20)	Unattached	2005	
30	MF	Lewis Dark	(England)	10 April 1989 (aged 17)	Youth	2007	
32	MF	Michael Leary	(England)	17 April 1983 (aged 23)	Luton Town	2007	On loan from Luton Town
Forwards
9	FW	Lloyd Owusu	(Ghana)	12 November 1976 (aged 29)	Reading	2005	
10	FW	Jo Kuffour	(England)	17 November 1981 (aged 24)	Torquay United	2006	
12	FW	Neil Shipperley	(England)	30 October 1974 (aged 31)	Sheffield United	2007	
19	FW	Calum Willock	(Saint Kitts and Nevis)	29 October 1981 (aged 24)	Peterborough United	2006	
25	FW	Charlie Ide	(England)	10 May 1988 (aged 18)	Youth	2005	Loaned to Sutton United
29	FW	Ross Montague	(England)	1 November 1988 (aged 17)	Youth	2007	
Players who left the club mid-season
~~8~~	MF	Ólafur Ingi Skúlason	(Iceland)	1 April 1983 (aged 23)	Arsenal	2005	Released
8	FW	Scott Taylor	(England)	5 May 1976 (aged 30)	Milton Keynes Dons	2007	Returned to Milton Keynes Dons after loan
11	MF	Gavin Tomlin	(England)	21 August 1983 (aged 22)	Windsor & Eton	2006	Released
~~12~~	FW	Scott P. Fitzgerald	(England)	18 November 1979 (aged 26)	Watford	2005	Loaned to AFC Wimbledon, released
~~15~~	FW	Chris Moore	(Wales)	13 January 1980 (aged 26)	Dagenham & Redbridge	2006	Released
15	DF	Garry Richards	(England)	11 June 1986 (aged 20)	Colchester United	2007	Returned to Colchester United after loan
~~16~~	MF	Simon Cox	(Republic of Ireland)	28 April 1987 (aged 19)	Reading	2006	Returned to Reading after loans
~~16~~	FW	Fola Onibuje	(England)	25 September 1984 (aged 21)	Swindon Town	2006	Returned to Swindon Town after loan
27	MF	Jamie England	(England)	27 May 1988 (aged 18)	Unattached	2006	Released
~~28~~	FW	Clyde Wijnhard	(Netherlands)	1 November 1973 (aged 32)	Unattached	2006	Released
31	DF	David Partridge	(Wales)	26 November 1978 (aged 27)	Bristol City	2007	Returned to Bristol City after loan
33	DF	Che Wilson	(England)	17 January 1979 (aged 27)	Southend United	2007	Returned to Southend United after loan

- Source: Soccerbase

== Coaching staff ==
=== Leroy Rosenior (5 August – 18 November 2006) ===
Name	Role
(Sierra Leone) Leroy Rosenior	Manager
(England) John Griffin	Assistant Manager, Chief Scout
(England) Paul Mortimer	First Team Coach
(England) Jim Stannard	Goalkeeping Coach
(England) Brett Hutchinson	Physiotherapist

=== Scott B. Fitzgerald (18 November 2006 – 10 April 2007) ===
=== Name ===	Role
(Republic of Ireland) Scott B. Fitzgerald	Manager
(England) John Griffin	Assistant Manager, Chief Scout
(England) Alan Reeves	First Team Coach
(England) Jim Stannard	Goalkeeping Coach
(England) Brett Hutchinson	Physiotherapist

=== Barry Quin (10 April – 5 May 2007) ===
=== Name ===	Role
(England) Barry Quin	Caretaker Manager
(England) John Griffin	Assistant Manager, Chief Scout
(England) Jim Stannard	Goalkeeping Coach
(England) Brett Hutchinson	Physiotherapist

== Statistics ==
=== Appearances and goals ===
Substitute appearances in brackets.

No	Pos	Nat	Name	League		FA Cup		League Cup		FL Trophy		Total	
No	Pos	Nat	Name	Apps	Goals	Apps	Goals	Apps	Goals	Apps	Goals	Apps	Goals
1	GK	(England)	Stuart Nelson	19	0	0	0	2	0	0	0	21	0
2	DF	(Republic of Ireland)	Kevin O'Connor	38 (1)	6	1	0	1	1	2	0	42 (1)	7
3	DF	(England)	Andy Frampton	32	1	1	0	0	0	2	0	35	1
4	MF	(France)	Thomas Pinault	24 (3)	1	0 (1)	0	2	0	1	0	27 (4)	1
5	DF	(England)	Matthew Heywood	25 (3)	1	0	0	2	0	2	0	29 (3)	1
6	DF	(Australia)	Adam Griffiths	32 (5)	1	1	0	1	0	0	0	34 (5)	1
7	MF	(England)	Paul Brooker	24 (10)	0	1	0	2	0	1 (1)	0	28 (11)	0
~~8~~	MF	(Iceland)	Ólafur Ingi Skúlason	10	1	1	0	0	0	2	0	13	1
9	FW	(Ghana)	Lloyd Owusu	4 (3)	0	0	0	0	0	0	0	4 (3)	0
10	FW	(England)	Jo Kuffour	38 (1)	12	1	0	2	1	2	1	43 (1)	14
11	MF	(England)	Gavin Tomlin	6 (6)	0	0	0	1	0	1 (1)	0	8 (7)	0
12	FW	(England)	Neil Shipperley	11	0	—		—		—		11	0
14	MF	(England)	Karle Carder-Andrews	2 (3)	0	0	0	0	0	1	0	3 (3)	0
~~15~~	FW	(Wales)	Chris Moore	8 (8)	2	0 (1)	0	1 (1)	0	1	0	10 (10)	2
16	DF	(England)	Joe Keith	17 (1)	2	—		—		—		17 (1)	2
17	MF	(England)	Alex Rhodes	8 (7)	0	0	0	1	0	—		9 (7)	0
18	DF	(England)	Sam Tillen	28 (6)	1	1	0	2	0	1	0	32 (6)	1
19	FW	(Saint Kitts and Nevis)	Calum Willock	18 (10)	3	0	0	0 (1)	0	0	0	18 (11)	3
20	MF	(England)	Ryan Peters	0 (13)	0	0	0	0	0	1 (1)	0	1 (14)	0
21	GK	(England)	Clark Masters	11	0	1	0	0	0	2	0	14	0
22	MF	(England)	John Mousinho	29 (5)	0	1	0	2	0	1 (1)	0	33 (6)	0
23	DF	(England)	Darius Charles	9 (8)	1	—		1 (1)	0	—		10 (9)	1
24	DF	(England)	Karleigh Osborne	17 (4)	0	0	0	1 (1)	0	1	0	19 (5)	0
25	FW	(England)	Charlie Ide	24 (2)	7	1	0	0 (1)	0	1	0	26 (3)	7
27	MF	(England)	Jamie England	0	0	—		0 (1)	0	—		0 (1)	0
~~28~~	FW	(Netherlands)	Clyde Wijnhard	7 (2)	0	0 (1)	0	—		0 (2)	0	7 (5)	0
28	GK	(England)	Nathan Abbey	16	0	—		—		—		16	0
29	FW	(England)	Ross Montague	0 (4)	0	0	0	0	0	0	0	0 (4)	0
30	MF	(England)	Lewis Dark	2 (1)	0	0	0	0	0	0	0	2 (1)	0
	Players loaned in during the season												
8	FW	(England)	Scott Taylor	3 (3)	0	—		—		—		3 (3)	0
15	DF	(England)	Garry Richards	10	1	—		—		—		10	1
~~16~~	FW	(Republic of Ireland)	Simon Cox	11 (2)	0	—		1	0	—		12 (2)	0
~~16~~	FW	(England)	Fola Onibuje	0 (2)	0	1	0	—		—		1 (2)	0
31	DF	(Wales)	David Partridge	3	0	—		—		—		3	0
32	MF	(England)	Michael Leary	17	0	—		—		—		17	0
33	DF	(England)	Che Wilson	3	0	—		—		—		3	0

- Players listed in italics left the club mid-season.
- Source: Soccerbase

=== Goalscorers ===
No	Pos	Nat	Player	FL1	FAC	FLC	FLT	Total
10	FW	(England)	Jo Kuffour	12	0	1	1	14
25	FW	(England)	Charlie Ide	7	0	0	0	7
2	DF	(Republic of Ireland)	Kevin O'Connor	6	0	1	0	7
19	FW	(Saint Kitts and Nevis)	Calum Willock	3	0	0	0	3
16	DF	(England)	Joe Keith	2	—	—	—	2
~~15~~	FW	(Wales)	Chris Moore	2	0	0	0	2
15	DF	(England)	Garry Richards	1	—	—	—	1
23	DF	(England)	Darius Charles	1	—	0	—	1
3	DF	(England)	Andy Frampton	1	0	0	0	1
6	DF	(Australia)	Adam Griffiths	1	0	0	0	1
5	DF	(England)	Matthew Heywood	1	0	0	0	1
4	MF	(France)	Thomas Pinault	1	0	0	0	1
~~8~~	MF	(Iceland)	Ólafur Ingi Skúlason	1	0	0	0	1
18	DF	(England)	Sam Tillen	1	0	0	0	1
Total				40	0	2	1	43

- Players listed in italics left the club mid-season.
- Source: Soccerbase

=== Discipline ===
No	Pos	Nat	Player	FL1		FAC		FLC		FLT		Total		Pts
No	Pos	Nat	Player	Booked	Sent off (straight red)	Booked	Sent off (straight red)	Booked	Sent off (straight red)	Booked	Sent off (straight red)	Booked	Sent off (straight red)	Pts
6	DF	(Australia)	Adam Griffiths	10	0	0	0	1	0	0	0	11	0	11
32	MF	(England)	Michael Leary	10	0	—		—		—		10	0	10
24	DF	(England)	Karleigh Osborne	6	1	0	0	1	0	0	0	7	1	10
~~15~~	FW	(Wales)	Chris Moore	3	0	1	0	0	1	1	0	5	1	8
4	MF	(France)	Thomas Pinault	6	0	0	0	1	0	0	0	7	0	7
10	FW	(England)	Jo Kuffour	3	1	0	0	0	0	0	0	3	1	6
25	FW	(England)	Charlie Ide	2	1	0	0	1	0	0	0	3	1	6
3	DF	(England)	Andy Frampton	4	0	0	0	0	0	1	0	5	0	5
22	MF	(England)	John Mousinho	4	0	0	0	1	0	0	0	5	0	5
31	DF	(Wales)	David Partridge	1	1	—		—		—		1	1	4
~~16~~	FW	(Republic of Ireland)	Simon Cox	3	0	—		1	0	—		4	0	4
5	DF	(England)	Matthew Heywood	4	0	0	0	0	0	0	0	4	0	4
7	MF	(England)	Paul Brooker	2	0	1	0	1	0	0	0	4	0	4
33	DF	(England)	Che Wilson	0	1	—		—		—			1	3
21	GK	(England)	Clark Masters	0	1	0	0	0	0	0	0		1	3
15	DF	(England)	Garry Richards	2	0	—		—		—		2	0	2
23	DF	(England)	Darius Charles	2	0	—		0	0	—		2	0	2
~~8~~	MF	(Iceland)	Ólafur Ingi Skúlason	2	0	0	0	0	0	0	0	2	0	2
2	DF	(Republic of Ireland)	Kevin O'Connor	1	0	1	0	0	0	0	0	2	0	2
20	MF	(England)	Ryan Peters	1	0	0	0	0	0	1	0	2	0	2
28	GK	(England)	Nathan Abbey	1	0	—		—		—		1	0	1
12	FW	(England)	Neil Shipperley	1	0	—		—		—		1	0	1
8	FW	(England)	Scott Taylor	1	0	—		—		—		1	0	1
14	MF	(England)	Karle Carder-Andrews	1	0	0	0	0	0	0	0	1	0	1
29	FW	(England)	Ross Montague	1	0	0	0	0	0	0	0	1	0	1
1	GK	(England)	Stuart Nelson	1	0	0	0	0	0	0	0	1	0	1
18	DF	(England)	Sam Tillen	1	0	0	0	0	0	0	0	1	0	1
19	FW	(Saint Kitts and Nevis)	Calum Willock	1	0	0	0	0	0	0	0	1	0	1
Total				74	6	3	0	7	1	3	0	87	7	108

- Players listed in italics left the club mid-season.
- Source: ESPN FC

=== International caps ===
No	Pos	Nat	Player	Caps	Goals	Ref
~~8~~	MF	(Iceland)	Ólafur Ingi Skúlason	1	0	

- Players listed in italics left the club mid-season.

=== Management ===
Name	Nat	From	To	Record All Comps					Record League				
Name	Nat	From	To	P	W	D	L	W %	P	W	D	L	W %
Leroy Rosenior	(Sierra Leone)	5 August 2006	18 November 2006	23	3	10	10	13.04|	18	3	8	7	16.67
Scott B. Fitzgerald	(Republic of Ireland)	18 November 2006	10 April 2007	25	4	5	16	16.00|	25	4	5	16	16.00
Barry Quin (caretaker)	(England)	10 April 2007	5 May 2007	4	1	0	3	25.00|	4	1	0	3	25.00

=== Summary ===
Games played	50 (46 League One, 1 FA Cup, 2 League Cup, 2 Football League Trophy)
Games won	8 (8 League One, 0 FA Cup, 0 League Cup, 0 Football League Trophy)
Games drawn	15 (13 League One, 0 FA Cup, 1 League Cup, 1 Football League Trophy)
Games lost	28 (25 League One, 1 FA Cup, 1 League Cup, 1 Football League Trophy)
Goals scored	43 (40 League One, 0 FA Cup, 2 League Cup, 1 Football League Trophy)
Goals conceded	87 (79 League One, 1 FA Cup, 5 League Cup, 2 Football League Trophy)
Clean sheets	7 (6 League One, 0 FA Cup, 0 League Cup, 1 Football League Trophy)
Biggest league win	2–0 versus Huddersfield Town, 17 February 2007; 3–1 versus Blackpool, 3 February 2007
Worst league defeat	4–0 on two occasions
Most appearances	44, Jo Kuffour (39 League One, 1 FA Cup, 2 League Cup, 2 Football League Trophy)
Top scorer (league)	12, Jo Kuffour
Top scorer (all competitions)	14, Jo Kuffour

== Transfers & loans ==
Players transferred in
Date	Pos.	Name	Previous club	Fee	Ref.
1 July 2006	FW	(England) Jo Kuffour	(England) Torquay United	Free	
6 July 2006	FW	(Wales) Chris Moore	(England) Dagenham & Redbridge	Free	
11 July 2006	DF	(Australia) Adam Griffiths	(England) Bournemouth	Free	
18 July 2006	MF	(France) Thomas Pinault	Unattached	Free	
25 July 2006	MF	(England) Gavin Tomlin	(England) Windsor & Eton	Free	
18 August 2006	DF	(England) Matthew Heywood	(England) Bristol City	Undisclosed	
18 September 2006	MF	Jamie England	Unattached	Non-contract	
25 September 2006	FW	(Netherlands) Clyde Wijnhard	Unattached	Free	
3 January 2007	DF	(England) Joe Keith	(England) Leyton Orient	Undisclosed	
26 January 2007	GK	(England) Nathan Abbey	(England) Torquay United	Free	
23 January 2007	FW	(England) Neil Shipperley	(England) Sheffield United	Free	
Players loaned in
Date from	Pos.	Name	From	Date to	Ref.
27 July 2006	DF	(England) Matthew Heywood	(England) Bristol City	17 August 2006	
11 September 2006	FW	(Republic of Ireland) Simon Cox	(England) Reading	27 September 2006	
10 November 2006	FW	(England) Fola Onibuje	(England) Swindon Town	8 December 2006	
22 November 2006	FW	(Republic of Ireland) Simon Cox	(England) Reading	7 January 2007	
29 December 2006	GK	(England) Nathan Abbey	(England) Torquay United	25 January 2006	
3 January 2007	DF	(Wales) David Partridge	(England) Bristol City	14 February 2007	
4 January 2007	MF	(England) Michael Leary	(England) Luton Town	End of season	
15 January 2007	DF	(England) Che Wilson	(England) Southend United	13 February 2007	
9 February 2007	DF	(England) Garry Richards	(England) Colchester United	9 April 2007	
8 March 2007	FW	(England) Scott Taylor	(England) Milton Keynes Dons	10 April 2007	
Players transferred out
Date	Pos.	Name	Subsequent club	Fee	Ref.
3 July 2006	MF	(Republic of Ireland) Jay Tabb	(England) Coventry City	Undisclosed	
5 July 2006	DF	(England) Michael Turner	(England) Hull City	£350,000	
14 July 2006	DF	(Nigeria) Sam Sodje	(England) Reading	£350,000	
Players loaned out
Date from	Pos.	Name	To	Date to	Ref.
25 August 2006	FW	(England) Scott P. Fitzgerald	(England) AFC Wimbledon	September 2006	
12 September 2006	FW	(England) Charlie Ide	(England) Sutton United	30 October 2006	
10 October 2006	MF	(England) Alex Rhodes	(England) Swindon Town	10 November 2006	
16 October 2006	DF	(England) Darius Charles	(England) Staines Town	13 November 2006	
10 November 2006	FW	(England) Scott P. Fitzgerald	(England) AFC Wimbledon	January 2007	
14 November 2006	MF	(England) Ryan Peters	(England) Crawley Town	18 December 2006	
9 February 2007	DF	(England) Darius Charles	(England) Crawley Town	8 April 2007	
9 March 2007	MF	(England) Alex Rhodes	(England) Grays Athletic	April 2007	
16 March 2007	GK	(England) Clark Masters	(England) AFC Wimbledon	20 April 2007	
22 March 2007	MF	(England) Ryan Peters	(England) AFC Wimbledon	April 2007	
Players released
Date	Pos.	Name	Subsequent club	Join date	Ref.
10 October 2006	MF	Jamie England	(England) Crawley Town	31 January 2007	
23 December 2006	FW	(Netherlands) Clyde Wijnhard	Retired		
15 January 2007	FW	(England) Scott P. Fitzgerald	(England) Basingstoke Town	January 2007	
29 January 2007	FW	(Wales) Chris Moore	(England) Dagenham & Redbridge	30 January 2007	
30 January 2007	MF	(England) Gavin Tomlin	(England) Fisher Athletic	9 February 2007	
22 February 2007	MF	(Iceland) Ólafur Ingi Skúlason	(Sweden) Helsingborgs IF	22 February 2007	
30 June 2007	GK	(England) Nathan Abbey	(England) Milton Keynes Dons	1 August 2007	
30 June 2007	DF	(Australia) Adam Griffiths	(Australia) Newcastle Jets	16 May 2007	
30 June 2007	DF	(England) Joe Keith	(England) A.F.C. Hornchurch	18 June 2007	
30 June 2007	GK	(England) Stuart Nelson	(England) Leyton Orient	1 July 2007	
30 June 2007	FW	(Ghana) Lloyd Owusu	(England) Yeovil Town	6 July 2007	
30 June 2007	MF	(France) Thomas Pinault	(England) Crawley Town	13 July 2007	
30 June 2007	MF	(England) Alex Rhodes	(England) Bradford City	9 August 2007	
30 June 2007	FW	(England) Neil Shipperley	Retired		
30 June 2007	FW	(Saint Kitts and Nevis) Calum Willock	(England) Port Vale	1 August 2007	

== Kit ==
Supplier: Lonsdale
Sponsor(s): Samvo

Home	Away

Source: Brentford F.C.

== Awards ==
- Supporters' Player of the Year: Jo Kuffour
- Football League Best Sponsorship: Samvo
