= Barry Quin (football coach) =

English football manager

Managerial career
- Years: Team
- 2007: Brentford (caretaker)
- 2014: Watford (reserves)

Barry Quin is an English football youth coach. He previously spent two decades working in the youth setup at Brentford and served as first team caretaker manager for the final four games of the 2006–07 season. He served in a number of academy roles at Watford between 2010 and 2021.

== Coaching career ==
=== Brentford ===
Quin began working in the youth setup at Brentford in the early 1990s and was later named as Head Of Youth Development in 1996. In October 2004, Quin's role was extended and he was appointed youth team manager, assisted by Richard Dobson and Scott Fitzgerald. Fitzgerald replaced Quin as youth team manager in May 2005, with Quin continuing in his role as Head Of Youth Development. Throughout his tenure, Quin ran Brentford's Centre Of Excellence on a limited budget. After 20 years with the Bees, Quin left Griffin Park in July 2010 and was replaced by Ose Aibangee.

==== Caretaker manager ====
With Brentford already relegated to League Two, Quin served as caretaker manager for the final four matches of the 2006–07 season. Quin's first match was against Nottingham Forest on 14 April 2007, which resulted in a 4–2 defeat. The Bees picked up a surprise win in the penultimate match of the season, beating Port Vale 4–3 at Griffin Park. Quin's final match in charge was a 3–1 defeat to Tranmere Rovers and he was unable to keep Brentford from finishing bottom of League One. Quin picked squads with a heavy emphasis on youth, giving professional debuts to Lewis Dark and Ross Montague and including other youth products Karleigh Osborne, Darius Charles, Charlie Ide, Karle Carder-Andrews, Ryan Peters, Clark Masters, Seb Brown and Bradley Falco. After the season, Terry Butcher took over as first team manager.

=== Watford ===
Quin coached at the Harefield Academy as part of Watford's coaching scheme during the 2010–11 season, before being named U12-U16 academy manager in June 2011. Quin took charge of Watford's Mayo International Cup team in 2012. Quin managed Watford's U15 teams in 2012 and 2013 editions of the Milk Cup and oversaw a third-place finish in 2013. Quin was named Head of Academy – Coaching and Development in 2013 and served in the role until May 2021. He managed the club's reserve team between August and December 2014.

== Personal life ==
In January 2022, as part of the Premier League's Elite Heads of Coaching programme, Quin completed a postgraduate diploma in Elite Coach Development.

== Managerial statistics ==
Managerial record by team and tenure
Team	From	To	Record				
Team	From	To	G	W	D	L	Win %
Brentford (caretaker)	10 April 2007	5 May 2007	4	1	0	3	25.00
Total			4	1	0	3	25.00
