= 2007–08 Brentford F.C. season =

English football team season

Brentford
2007–08 season
- Chairman: Greg Dyke
- Manager: Terry Butcher (until 11 December 2007); Andy Scott (from 11 December 2007)
- Stadium: Griffin Park
- League Two: 14th
- FA Cup: First round
- League Cup: First round
- Football League Trophy: First round
- Top goalscorer: League: Poole (14); All: Poole (14)
- Highest home attendance: 6,246
- Lowest home attendance: 3,155
- Average home league attendance: 4,469
Home colours	Away colours

During the 2007–08 English football season, Brentford competed in Football League Two. With a second-successive relegation looking a possibility, manager Terry Butcher was replaced by his assistant Andy Scott in December 2007 and the club finished the season comfortably in mid-table.

== Season summary ==
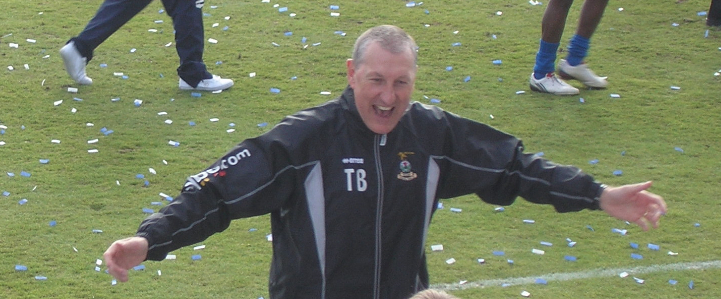
With Brentford heading towards a second-successive relegation, manager Terry Butcher was sacked in December 2007.

In April 2007, with two matches of the 2006–07 season still to play, Terry Butcher was announced as the new Brentford manager. He officially took charge on 7 May of a club newly-relegated to League Two and two days later he installed former Bees player Andy Scott as his assistant, citing the need "to appoint someone who has knowledge of the lower divisions". Aside from a number of released players, the previous season's top scorer Jo Kuffour and regular left back Andy Frampton departed the club and Butcher and Scott brought in goalkeeper Simon Brown, defenders John Mackie and Craig Pead, midfielders Gary Smith and Glenn Poole and forwards Alan Connell and Lee Thorpe on free transfers, in addition to five loanees to cover for lack of numbers in the squad. Despite Brentford supporter Matthew Benham spending £3,000,000 in January 2007 to take over the club's loans from previous chairman Ron Noades' company Altonwood, the management team would be forced to work to a tight budget during the 2007–08 season.

Two wins from the opening four matches of the season put Brentford into the play-off places, though it would prove to be a false dawn. Five defeats from six matches in September and October dropped the Bees down to 17th and five consecutive defeats in November without scoring a goal led Butcher to leave Griffin Park by mutual consent on 11 December. Andy Scott took over as caretaker manager and immediately galvanised the team, with 8 wins from his first 12 matches lifting Brentford from 19th to 11th. Scott was given the job on a permanent basis on 4 January 2008 and in a bid to reduce the average age of the squad, he released seven players and signed left back Ryan Dickson and striker Nathan Elder on permanent deals. Scott would loan eight players between January and the end of the season, to cover for injuries to Kevin O'Connor, Simon Brown, Matthew Heywood, John Mousinho and for loanees who had returned to their clubs. The team stalled in the final months of the season and lost 10 of the last 15 matches to finish in 14th place.

== League table ==
Pos	Team	Pld	W	D	L	GF	GA	GD	Pts
12	Barnet	46	16	12	18	56	63	−7	60
13	Bury	46	16	11	19	58	61	−3	59
14	Brentford	46	17	8	21	52	70	−18	59
15	Lincoln City	46	18	4	24	61	77	−16	58
16	Grimsby Town	46	15	10	21	55	66	−11	55

Updated to match(es) played on 3 May 2008. Source: The Football League
Rules for classification: 1) points; 2) goal difference; 3) number of goals scored.

== Results ==
Brentford's goal tally listed first.

=== Legend ===
Win	Draw	Loss

=== Pre-season and friendlies ===
Date	Opponent	Venue	Result	Attendance	Scorer(s)
12 July 2007	Staines Town	A	2–2	1,227	Thorpe, Ide
14 July 2007	Harrow Borough	A	0–1	n/a	
17 July 2007	Hampton & Richmond Borough	A	0–1	n/a	
18 July 2007	Basingstoke Town	A	2–2	n/a	Montague (2)
25 July 2007	Reading	H	1–6	n/a	Moore
28 July 2007	Sutton United	A	1–3	427	Ide
31 July 2007	Chelsea XI	H	1–0	n/a	Connell
4 August 2007	Southampton	H	0–1	n/a	
26 September 2007	Leyton Orient	H	0–2	0	

=== Football League Two ===
No.	Date	Opponent	Venue	Result	Attendance	Scorer(s)
1	11 August 2007	Mansfield Town	H	1–1	4,909	Connell
2	18 August 2007	Notts County	A	1–1	4,670	O'Connor
3	25 August 2007	Barnet	H	2–1	4,744	O'Connor (pen), Mousinho
4	1 September 2007	Bury	A	2–1	2,301	Poole, Shakes
5	9 September 2007	Wycombe Wanderers	A	0–1	4,711	
6	15 September 2007	Milton Keynes Dons	H	0–3	4,476	
7	22 September 2007	Chester City	A	2–0	2,453	Thorpe, Moore
8	29 September 2007	Stockport County	H	1–3	4,449	Connell
9	2 October 2007	Dagenham & Redbridge	H	2–3	3,662	Mousinho, Thorpe
10	6 October 2007	Hereford United	A	0–2	2,942	
11	12 October 2007	Rotherham United	H	1–1	3,841	Thorpe
12	20 October 2007	Rochdale	A	1–1	2,424	Poole
13	27 October 2007	Lincoln City	H	1–0	4,368	Moore
14	3 November 2007	Bradford City	A	2–1	13,326	Poole, Thorpe
15	6 November 2007	Macclesfield Town	A	0–1	1,378	
16	17 November 2007	Darlington	H	0–2	4,657	
17	24 November 2007	Peterborough United	A	0–7	4,865	
18	4 December 2007	Morecambe	H	0–1	3,155	
19	8 December 2007	Grimsby Town	H	0–1	3,999	
20	15 December 2007	Wrexham	A	3–1	3,811	Connell (2), Evans (og)
21	21 December 2007	Milton Keynes Dons	A	1–1	8,445	Connell
22	26 December 2007	Wycombe Wanderers	H	1–3	5,841	Poole
23	29 December 2007	Chester City	H	3–0	4,323	Connell, Montague, Poole
24	1 January 2008	Dagenham & Redbridge	A	2–1	2,353	Poole (2)
25	5 January 2008	Shrewsbury Town	A	1–0	5,083	Osborne
26	12 January 2008	Chesterfield	H	2–1	4,882	Smith, Poole
27	29 January 2008	Notts County	H	0–0	4,332	
28	2 February 2008	Mansfield Town	A	3–2	2,511	O'Connor, Connell, Elder
29	9 February 2008	Shrewsbury Town	H	1–1	5,353	Connell
30	12 February 2008	Barnet	A	2–1	2,522	Poole (2, 1 pen)
31	16 February 2008	Accrington Stanley	H	3–1	4,635	Poole, Heywood, Connell
32	23 February 2008	Chesterfield	A	0–1	3,728	
33	26 February 2008	Accrington Stanley	A	0–1	1,149	
34	1 March 2008	Darlington	A	1–3	3,508	Reid
35	4 March 2008	Bury	H	1–4	3,333	Poole (pen)
36	8 March 2008	Macclesfield Town	H	1–0	3,863	Poole
37	11 March 2008	Peterborough United	H	1–2	4,049	Connell
38	15 March 2008	Morecambe	A	1–3	2,180	Elder
39	22 March 2008	Wrexham	H	2–0	4,448	Shakes (2)
40	24 March 2008	Grimsby Town	A	2–1	4,620	Connell, W. Brown
41	29 March 2008	Rochdale	H	0–2	4,896	
42	5 April 2008	Rotherham United	A	2–1	2,979	Elder, Connell
43	12 April 2008	Bradford City	H	2–2	4,336	Poole, Bennett
44	19 April 2008	Lincoln City	A	1–3	3,699	Elder
45	26 April 2008	Hereford United	H	0–3	6,246	
46	3 May 2008	Stockport County	A	0–1	6,284	

=== FA Cup ===
Round	Date	Opponent	Venue	Result	Attendance	Scorer(s)
R1	10 November 2007	Luton Town	A	1–1	4,167	Ide
R1 (replay)	27 November 2007	Luton Town	H	0–2	2,643	

=== Football League Cup ===
Round	Date	Opponent	Venue	Result	Attendance
R1	14 August 2007	Bristol City	H	0–3	2,213

=== Football League Trophy ===
Round	Date	Opponent	Venue	Result	Attendance	Scorer(s)
SR1	4 September 2007	Swindon Town	A	1–4	3,118	Shakes

- Sources: Soccerbase, 11v11

== Playing squad ==
Players' ages are as of the opening day of the 2007–08 season.

No	Position	Name	Nationality	Date of birth (age)	Signed from	Signed in	Notes
Goalkeepers
1	GK	Simon Brown	(England)	12 March 1976 (aged 31)	Hibernian	2007	
27	GK	Ben Hamer	(England)	20 November 1987 (aged 19)	Reading	2007	On loan from Reading
28	GK	Seb Brown	(England)	24 November 1989 (aged 17)	Youth	2006	Loaned to St Albans City and Windsor & Eton
Defenders
5	DF	Alan Bennett	(Republic of Ireland)	4 October 1981 (aged 25)	Reading	2007	On loan from Reading
6	DF	Osei Sankofa	(England)	19 March 1985 (aged 22)	Charlton Athletic	2007	On loan from Charlton Athletic
15	DF	Matthew Heywood (c)	(England)	26 August 1979 (aged 27)	Bristol City	2006	
18	DF	Darius Charles	(England)	10 December 1987 (aged 19)	Youth	2004	Loaned to Sutton United and Ebbsfleet United
19	DF	Ryan Dickson	(England)	14 December 1986 (aged 20)	Plymouth Argyle	2007	Loaned from Plymouth Argyle before transferring permanently
22	DF	Karleigh Osborne	(England)	19 March 1988 (aged 19)	Youth	2004	
31	DF	Lanre Oyebanjo	(Republic of Ireland)	27 April 1990 (aged 17)	Waltham Forest	2007	Non-contract
Midfielders
2	MF	Kevin O'Connor	(Republic of Ireland)	24 February 1982 (aged 25)	Youth	2000	
7	MF	Gary Smith	(England)	30 January 1984 (aged 23)	Milton Keynes Dons	2007	
8	MF	Craig Pead	(England)	15 September 1981 (aged 25)	Walsall	2007	
11	MF	Glenn Poole	(England)	3 February 1981 (aged 26)	Grays Athletic	2007	
12	MF	John Mousinho	(England)	30 April 1986 (aged 21)	Unattached	2005	
21	MF	Wayne Brown	(England)	8 August 1988 (aged 19)	Fulham	2008	On loan from Fulham
24	MF	Lewis Dark	(England)	10 April 1989 (aged 18)	Youth	2007	Loaned to Farnborough and Ramsgate
29	MF	Ricky Shakes	(Guyana)	25 January 1985 (aged 22)	Swindon Town	2007	
Forwards
10	FW	Alan Connell	(England)	5 February 1983 (aged 24)	Hereford United	2007	
14	FW	Nathan Elder	(England)	5 April 1985 (aged 22)	Brighton & Hove Albion	2008	
16	FW	Charlie Ide	(England)	10 May 1988 (aged 19)	Youth	2005	Loaned to Lewes
23	FW	Ross Montague	(England)	1 November 1988 (aged 18)	Youth	2007	Loaned to Sutton United and Welling United
Players who left the club mid-season
~~3~~	DF	Grant Basey	(Wales)	30 November 1988 (aged 18)	Charlton Athletic	2007	Returned to Charlton Athletic after loan
3	DF	Lewis Emanuel	(England)	14 October 1983 (aged 23)	Luton Town	2007	Returned to Luton Town after loan
~~4~~	MF	Sammy Moore	(England)	7 September 1987 (aged 19)	Ipswich Town	2007	Returned to Ipswich Town after loan
4	MF	Jordan Parkes	(England)	26 July 1989 (aged 18)	Watford	2008	Returned to Watford after loan
~~5~~	DF	John Mackie	(England)	5 July 1976 (aged 31)	Leyton Orient	2007	Released
~~6~~	DF	David Partridge	(Wales)	26 November 1978 (aged 28)	Bristol City	2007	Released
9	FW	Lee Thorpe	(England)	14 December 1975 (aged 31)	Torquay United	2007	Released
~~14~~	DF	Sam Tillen	(England)	16 April 1985 (aged 22)	Chelsea	2005	Released
~~17~~	MF	Karle Carder-Andrews	(England)	13 March 1989 (aged 18)	Youth	2006	Loaned to Margate, released
17	FW	Reuben Reid	(England)	26 July 1988 (aged 19)	Plymouth Argyle	2008	Returned to Plymouth Argyle after loan
~~19~~	MF	Paul Brooker	(England)	25 November 1976 (aged 30)	Reading	2005	Released
20	MF	Robert Milsom	(England)	2 January 1987 (aged 20)	Fulham	2008	Returned to Fulham after loan
~~20~~	MF	Ryan Peters	(England)	21 August 1987 (aged 19)	Youth	2004	Loaned to Margate, transferred to Margate
~~21~~	GK	Clark Masters	(England)	31 May 1987 (aged 20)	Youth	2005	Loaned to Welling United, transferred to Southend United
~~25~~	DF	Ben Starosta	(Poland)	7 January 1987 (aged 20)	Sheffield United	2007	Returned to Sheffield United after loan
25	MF	Craig Stone	(England)	29 December 1988 (aged 18)	Gillingham	2008	Returned to Gillingham after loan
~~26~~	DF	Adrian Pettigrew	(England)	12 November 1986 (aged 20)	Chelsea	2007	Returned to Chelsea after loan
26	FW	Emile Sinclair	(England)	29 December 1987 (aged 19)	Nottingham Forest	2007	Returned to Nottingham Forest after loan

- Source: Soccerbase

== Coaching staff ==
=== Terry Butcher (11 August – 11 December 2007) ===
Name	Role
(England) Terry Butcher	Manager
(England) Andy Scott	Assistant Manager
(England) Steve Marsella	Goalkeeping Coach
(England) Brett Hutchinson	Physiotherapist

=== Andy Scott (11 December 2007 – 3 May 2008) ===
=== Name ===	Role
(England) Andy Scott	Manager
(England) Terry Bullivant	Assistant Manager
(England) Steve Marsella	Goalkeeping Coach
(England) Brett Hutchinson	Physiotherapist

== Statistics ==
=== Appearances and goals ===
Substitute appearances in brackets.

No	Pos	Nat	Name	League		FA Cup		League Cup		FL Trophy		Total	
No	Pos	Nat	Name	Apps	Goals	Apps	Goals	Apps	Goals	Apps	Goals	Apps	Goals
1	GK	(England)	Simon Brown	26	0	1	0	0	0	1	0	28	0
2	MF	(Republic of Ireland)	Kevin O'Connor	36 (1)	3	2	0	1	0	1	0	40 (1)	3
~~5~~	DF	(England)	John Mackie	14	0	1	0	1	0	0	0	16	0
7	MF	(England)	Gary Smith	26 (3)	1	0 (1)	0	0 (1)	0	1	0	27 (5)	1
8	MF	(England)	Craig Pead	27 (5)	0	2	0	0	0	0 (1)	0	29 (6)	0
9	FW	(England)	Lee Thorpe	17 (2)	4	2	0	0	0	0	0	19 (2)	4
10	FW	(England)	Alan Connell	35 (7)	12	1	0	1	0	1	0	38 (7)	12
11	MF	(England)	Glenn Poole	42 (3)	14	2	0	0	0	1	0	45 (3)	14
12	MF	(England)	John Mousinho	13 (10)	2	0	0	1	0	0	0	14 (10)	2
~~14~~	DF	(England)	Sam Tillen	0 (1)	0	0	0	0 (1)	0	0	0	0 (2)	0
14	FW	(England)	Nathan Elder	16 (1)	4	—		—		—		16 (1)	4
15	DF	(England)	Matthew Heywood	30 (2)	1	2	0	0	0	1	0	33 (2)	1
16	FW	(England)	Charlie Ide	16 (3)	0	2	1	1	0	0 (1)	0	19 (4)	1
18	DF	(England)	Darius Charles	8 (9)	0	1 (1)	0	—		—		9 (10)	0
~~19~~	MF	(England)	Paul Brooker	0 (1)	0	—		0	0	—		0 (1)	0
19	DF	(England)	Ryan Dickson	30 (1)	0	0	0	—		—		30 (1)	0
~~20~~	MF	(England)	Ryan Peters	0 (4)	0	0	0	0 (1)	0	0 (1)	0	0 (6)	0
~~21~~	GK	(England)	Clark Masters	0 (1)	0	1	0	0	0	—		1 (1)	0
22	DF	(England)	Karleigh Osborne	25 (4)	1	0 (1)	0	0	0	1	0	26 (5)	1
23	FW	(England)	Ross Montague	7 (3)	1	—		—		—		7 (3)	1
29	MF	(Guyana)	Ricky Shakes	25 (14)	3	1 (1)	0	—		1	1	27 (15)	4
	Players loaned in during the season												
~~3~~	DF	(Wales)	Grant Basey	8	0	—		1	0	1	0	10	0
3	DF	(England)	Lewis Emanuel	3	0	0	0	—		—		3	0
~~4~~	MF	(England)	Sammy Moore	13 (7)	2	2	0	1	0	1	0	17 (7)	2
4	MF	(England)	Jordan Parkes	0 (1)	0	—		—		—		0 (1)	0
5	DF	(Republic of Ireland)	Alan Bennett	11	1	—		—		—		11	1
6	DF	(England)	Osei Sankofa	10 (1)	0	—		—		—		10 (1)	0
17	FW	(England)	Reuben Reid	1 (9)	1	—		—		—		1 (9)	1
20	MF	(England)	Robert Milsom	5 (1)	0	—		—		—		5 (1)	0
21	MF	(England)	Wayne Brown	7 (4)	1	—		—		—		7 (4)	1
~~25~~	DF	(Poland)	Ben Starosta	20 (1)	0	1	0	1	0	0	0	22 (1)	0
25	MF	(England)	Craig Stone	5 (1)	0	—		—		—		5 (1)	0
~~26~~	DF	(England)	Adrian Pettigrew	9 (2)	0	1	0	1	0	1	0	12 (2)	0
26	FW	(England)	Emile Sinclair	1 (3)	0	—		—		—		1 (3)	0
27	GK	(England)	Ben Hamer	20	0	—		1	0	0	0	21	0

- Players listed in italics left the club mid-season.
- Source: Soccerbase

=== Goalscorers ===
No	Pos	Nat	Player	FL2	FAC	FLC	FLT	Total
11	MF	(England)	Glenn Poole	14	0	0	0	14
10	FW	(England)	Alan Connell	12	0	0	0	12
14	FW	(England)	Nathan Elder	4	—	—	—	4
9	FW	(England)	Lee Thorpe	4	0	0	0	4
29	MF	(Guyana)	Ricky Shakes	3	0	—	1	4
2	MF	(Republic of Ireland)	Kevin O'Connor	3	0	0	0	3
~~4~~	MF	(England)	Sammy Moore	2	0	0	0	2
12	MF	(England)	John Mousinho	2	0	0	0	2
5	DF	(Republic of Ireland)	Alan Bennett	1	—	—	—	1
21	MF	(England)	Wayne Brown	1	—	—	—	1
23	FW	(England)	Ross Montague	1	—	—	—	1
17	FW	(England)	Reuben Reid	1	—	—	—	1
15	DF	(England)	Matthew Heywood	1	0	0	0	1
7	MF	(England)	Gary Smith	1	0	0	0	1
16	FW	(England)	Charlie Ide	0	1	0	0	1
Opponents				1	0	0	0	1
Total				52	1	0	1	54

- Players listed in italics left the club mid-season.
- Source: Soccerbase

=== Discipline ===
No	Pos	Nat	Player	FL2		FAC		FLC		FLT		Total		Pts
No	Pos	Nat	Player	Booked	Sent off (straight red)	Booked	Sent off (straight red)	Booked	Sent off (straight red)	Booked	Sent off (straight red)	Booked	Sent off (straight red)	Pts
7	MF	(England)	Gary Smith	5	1	0	0	0	0	0	0	5	1	8
~~4~~	MF	(England)	Sammy Moore	3	1	0	0	1	0	0	0	4	1	7
9	FW	(England)	Lee Thorpe	3	1	0	0	0	0	0	0	3	1	6
~~5~~	DF	(England)	John Mackie	5	0	0	0	0	0	0	0	5	0	5
22	DF	(England)	Karleigh Osborne	5	0	0	0	0	0	0	0	5	0	5
15	DF	(England)	Matthew Heywood	3	0	1	0	0	0	0	0	4	0	4
~~25~~	DF	(Poland)	Ben Starosta	0	0	0	0	0	0	0	0	1	1	4
19	DF	(England)	Ryan Dickson	3	0	0	0	—		—		3	0	3
20	MF	(England)	Robert Milsom	3	0	—		—		—		3	0	3
27	GK	(England)	Ben Hamer	3	0	—		0	0	0	0	3	0	3
10	FW	(England)	Alan Connell	3	0	0	0	0	0	0	0	3	0	3
2	MF	(Republic of Ireland)	Kevin O'Connor	3	0	0	0	0	0	0	0	3	0	3
1	GK	(England)	Simon Brown	0	1	0	0	0	0	0	0	0	1	3
14	FW	(England)	Nathan Elder	2	0	—		—		—		2	0	2
18	DF	(England)	Darius Charles	2	0	0	0	—		—		2	0	2
12	MF	(England)	John Mousinho	2	0	0	0	0	0	0	0	2	0	2
~~26~~	DF	(England)	Adrian Pettigrew	2	0	0	0	0	0	0	0	2	0	2
6	DF	(England)	Osei Sankofa	1	0	—		—		—		1	0	1
~~3~~	DF	(Wales)	Grant Basey	1	0	—		0	0	0	0	1	0	1
~~21~~	GK	(England)	Clark Masters	0	0	1	0	0	0	—		1	0	1
16	FW	(England)	Charlie Ide	1	0	0	0	0	0	0	0	1	0	1
8	MF	(England)	Craig Pead	1	0	0	0	0	0	0	0	1	0	1
11	MF	(England)	Glenn Poole	1	0	0	0	0	0	0	0	1	0	1
Total				52	4	2	0	1	0	0	0	55	4	67

- Players listed in italics left the club mid-season.
- Source: ESPN FC

=== Management ===
Name	Nat	From	To	Record All Comps					Record League				
Name	Nat	From	To	P	W	D	L	W %	P	W	D	L	W %
Terry Butcher	(England)	11 August 2007	11 December 2007	23	5	5	13	21.74|	19	5	4	10	26.32
Andy Scott	(England)	11 December 2007	3 May 2008	27	12	4	11	44.44|	27	12	4	11	44.44

=== Summary ===
Games played	50 (46 League Two, 2 FA Cup, 1 League Cup, 1 Football League Trophy)
Games won	20 (17 League Two, 1 FA Cup, 1 League Cup, 1 Football League Trophy)
Games drawn	9 (8 League Two, 1 FA Cup, 0 League Cup, 0 Football League Trophy)
Games lost	24 (21 League Two, 1 FA Cup, 1 League Cup, 1 Football League Trophy)
Goals scored	54 (52 League Two, 1 FA Cup, 0 League Cup, 1 Football League Trophy)
Goals conceded	80 (70 League Two, 3 FA Cup, 3 League Cup, 4 Football League Trophy)
Clean sheets	7 (7 League Two, 0 FA Cup, 0 League Cup, 0 Football League Trophy)
Biggest league win	3–0 versus Chester City, 29 December 2007
Worst league defeat	7–0 versus Peterborough United, 24 November 2007
Most appearances	48, Glenn Poole (45 League Two, 2 FA Cup, 0 League Cup, 1 Football League Trophy)
Top scorer (league)	14, Glenn Poole
Top scorer (all competitions)	14, Glenn Poole

== Transfers & loans ==
Players transferred in
Date	Pos.	Name	Previous club	Fee	Ref.
1 July 2007	GK	(England) Simon Brown	(Scotland) Hibernian	Free	
1 July 2007	DF	(England) John Mackie	(England) Leyton Orient	Free	
1 July 2007	MF	(England) Glenn Poole	(England) Grays Athletic	Free	
2 July 2007	FW	(England) Alan Connell	(England) Hereford United	Free	
2 July 2007	DF	(England) Craig Pead	(England) Walsall	Free	
3 July 2007	FW	(England) Lee Thorpe	(England) Torquay United	Free	
1 August 2007	MF	(England) Gary Smith	(England) Milton Keynes Dons	Free	
31 August 2007	MF	(Guyana) Ricky Shakes	(England) Swindon Town	Free	
20 December 2007	DF	(Wales) David Partridge	Unattached	Free	
11 January 2008	DF	(England) Ryan Dickson	(England) Plymouth Argyle	Undisclosed	
11 January 2008	DF	(Republic of Ireland) Lanre Oyebanjo	(England) Waltham Forest	Non-contract	
31 January 2008	FW	(England) Nathan Elder	(England) Brighton & Hove Albion	£35,000	
Players loaned in
Date from	Pos.	Name	From	Date to	Ref.
18 July 2007	DF	(Wales) Grant Basey	(England) Charlton Athletic	18 October 2007	
25 July 2007	MF	(England) Sammy Moore	(England) Ipswich Town	6 January 2008	
1 August 2007	DF	(Poland) Ben Starosta	(England) Sheffield United	1 January 2008	
10 August 2007	GK	(England) Ben Hamer	(England) Reading	13 October 2007	
10 August 2007	DF	(England) Adrian Pettigrew	(England) Chelsea	11 November 2007	
25 October 2007	DF	(England) Lewis Emanuel	(England) Luton Town	25 November 2007	
16 November 2007	DF	(England) Ryan Dickson	(England) Plymouth Argyle	10 January 2008	
22 November 2007	FW	(England) Emile Sinclair	(England) Nottingham Forest	6 January 2008	
1 January 2008	GK	(England) Ben Hamer	(England) Reading	End of season	
17 January 2008	MF	(England) Jordan Parkes	(England) Watford	15 February 2008	
17 January 2008	MF	(England) Craig Stone	(England) Gillingham	12 March 2008	
21 January 2008	DF	(England) Osei Sankofa	(England) Charlton Athletic	End of season	
31 January 2008	FW	(England) Reuben Reid	(England) Plymouth Argyle	30 April 2008	
11 February 2008	MF	(England) Robert Milsom	(England) Fulham	12 March 2008	
25 February 2008	MF	(England) Wayne Brown	(England) Fulham	End of season	
7 March 2008	DF	(Republic of Ireland) Alan Bennett	(England) Reading	End of season	
Players transferred out
Date	Pos.	Name	Subsequent club	Fee	Ref.
1 July 2007	FW	(England) Jo Kuffour	(England) Bournemouth	Free	
1 July 2007	DF	(England) Andy Frampton	(England) Millwall	Undisclosed	
Players loaned out
Date from	Pos.	Name	To	Date to	Ref.
3 August 2007	DF	(England) Darius Charles	(England) Sutton United	20 September 2007	
3 August 2007	FW	(England) Ross Montague	(England) Sutton United	20 September 2007	
31 August 2007	GK	(England) Clark Masters	(England) Welling United	31 October 2007	
20 September 2007	FW	(England) Ross Montague	(England) Welling United	20 October 2007	
25 September 2007	MF	(England) Karle Carder-Andrews	(England) Margate	26 October 2007	
5 October 2007	GK	(England) Seb Brown	(England) St Albans City	October 2007	
26 October 2007	MF	(England) Lewis Dark	(England) Farnborough	26 November 2007	
October 2007	MF	(England) Ryan Peters	(England) Margate	January 2008	
1 December 2007	GK	(England) Seb Brown	(England) Windsor & Eton	End of season	
14 January 2008	MF	(England) Lewis Dark	(England) Ramsgate	14 February 2008	
7 March 2008	FW	(England) Charlie Ide	(England) Lewes	End of season	
20 March 2008	DF	(England) Darius Charles	(England) Ebbsfleet United	End of season	
Players released
Date	Pos.	Name	Subsequent club	Join date	Ref.
30 August 2007	MF	(England) Paul Brooker	(England) Chertsey Town	March 2008	
11 January 2008	MF	(England) Karle Carder-Andrews	(England) Egham Town	August 2008	
11 January 2008	DF	(England) John Mackie	(England) A.F.C. Hornchurch	11 January 2008	
11 January 2008	GK	(England) Clark Masters	(England) Southend United	11 January 2008	
11 January 2008	DF	(England) Sam Tillen	(Iceland) Fram	February 2008	
24 January 2008	MF	(England) Ryan Peters	(England) Margate	24 January 2008	
30 January 2008	DF	(Wales) David Partridge	(Republic of Ireland) St Patrick's Athletic	31 January 2008	
31 January 2008	FW	(England) Lee Thorpe	(England) Rochdale	31 January 2008	
30 June 2008	MF	(England) Lewis Dark	(England) Wivenhoe Town	26 September 2008	
30 June 2008	FW	(England) Charlie Ide	(England) Grays Athletic	1 July 2008	
30 June 2008	MF	(England) John Mousinho	(England) Wycombe Wanderers	1 July 2008	
30 June 2008	DF	(Republic of Ireland) Lanre Oyebanjo	(England) Histon	30 July 2008	
30 June 2008	MF	(Guyana) Ricky Shakes	(England) Ebbsfleet United	10 July 2008	

== Kit ==
Supplier: Puma
Sponsor(s): Samvo

Home	Away

Source: Brentford F.C.

== Awards ==
- Supporters' Player of the Year: Matthew Heywood
- Football League Two PFA Team of the Year: Craig Pead
- Football League Family Excellence Award
