= Lewis Dark =

Footballer (born 1989)

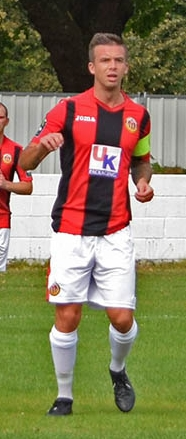
- Dark captaining Heybridge Swifts in 2017.

Personal information
- Full name: Lewis Kenneth Dark
- Date of birth: 11 April 1989 (age 37)
- Place of birth: Harlow, England
- Height: 1.73 m (5 ft 8 in)
- Positions: Central midfielder; defender

Youth career
- Tottenham Hotspur
- 2005–2007: Brentford

Senior career*
Years	Team	Apps	(Gls)
2007–2008	Brentford	3	(0)
2007	→ Farnborough (loan)	6	(1)
2008	→ Ramsgate (loan)	2	(0)
2008	Wivenhoe Town	1	(0)
2008	Crawley Town	1	(0)
2008	Fisher Athletic (London)	5	(0)
2009	Grays Athletic	0	(0)
2009–2011	Stansted		
2011–2012	Redbridge	34	(4)
2012–2014	Maldon & Tiptree	32	(1)
2014–2015	Grays Athletic	4	(0)
2015	Witham Town	22	(0)
2015	VCD Athletic	0	(0)
2015–2016	Thamesmead Town		
2016–2018	Heybridge Swifts	62	(0)
2018	Bishop's Stortford	10	(1)
2018–2019	Maldon & Tiptree	20	(0)
2019–2023	Grays Athletic	49	(0)

Managerial career
- 2022–2023: Grays Athletic
- * Club domestic league appearances and goals

Lewis Kenneth Dark (born 10 April 1989) is an English semi-professional footballer and manager.

A central midfielder or defender as a player, Dark began his career at Brentford, for whom he made appearances in the Football League, before dropping into non-League football upon his release in 2008. He managed Grays Athletic during the 2022–23 season.

== Playing career ==
=== Brentford ===
Dark began his career in the academy at Premier League club Tottenham Hotspur, before joining the Centre of Excellence at League One club Brentford during the 2005 off-season. Towards the end of a disastrous 2006–07 season in League One, manager Scott Fitzgerald left the club after a 3–0 defeat to Crewe Alexandra on 9 April 2007 confirmed the club's relegation to League Two. Head of Youth Barry Quin took over as caretaker manager until the end of the season and named Dark in his first squad for a match versus Doncaster Rovers on 21 April. Dark made his professional debut when he came on for Charlie Ide after 80 minutes of the 3–0 defeat. He made three appearances during the 2006–07 season.

In June 2007, Dark signed a one-year professional contract, with the option for a further year. Under new manager Terry Butcher for the 2007–08 season, Dark found himself out of favour and failed to receive a call into the first team squad during the first half of the campaign. He joined Southern League First Division South & West club Farnborough on a one-month loan on 26 October 2007. Brentford manager Butcher was replaced by his assistant Andy Scott in December 2007, who called Dark into the matchday squad for a league match versus Dagenham & Redbridge on 1 January 2008. He remained an unused substitute during the 2–1 victory. It was Dark's only involvement in the first team during the 2007–08 season and he moved to Isthmian League Premier Division club Ramsgate on a one-month loan on 1 February 2008. He made two appearances before returning to Brentford when his loan expired. Dark was released by Brentford at the end of the 2007–08 season.

=== Wivenhoe Town ===
Dark signed for Eastern Counties League Premier Division club Wivenhoe Town in September 2008. He only made a single appearance for the club, which came in a 2–1 defeat to Mildenhall Town on 27 September. His stay with the Dragons was brief and he departed the club on 3 October.

=== Crawley Town ===
Dark joined Conference Premier club Crawley Town on 3 October 2008. He made his debut as an injury time substitute for goalscorer Glenn Wilson in a 4–0 win over Barrow eight days later. He made two further cup appearances before his departure.

=== Fisher Athletic London ===
Dark dropped to the Conference South to club for Fisher Athletic London in November 2008 and made five appearances for the club.

=== Grays Athletic ===
Dark joined Conference Premier club Grays Athletic on non-contract terms in February 2009. He failed to make an appearance for the club and spent a period out injured.

=== Stansted ===
Dark moved to Essex Senior League club Stansted in August 2009. He won the first silverware of his career during the 2009–10 season, with the Blues winning the division title. Dark signed a new deal with the club during the 2010 off-season. Though Stansted finished runners up to Enfield 1893 in the league (after having three points deducted for fielding an ineligible player), the Blues won the Essex Senior League Challenge Cup by defeating the new champions 3–0 in the final. Dark left the club at the end of the 2010–11 season.

=== Redbridge ===
Dark joined Isthmian League First Division North club Redbridge on 27 May 2011. He made his competitive debut for the club against AFC Sudbury on 20 August 2011 and scored the Motormen's first goal in a 2–2 draw. Dark made 34 appearances and four goals before departing at the end of the 2011–12 season.

=== Maldon & Tiptree ===
Dark signed for Isthmian League First Division North club Maldon & Tiptree during the 2012 off-season. He was a virtual ever-present during the 2012–13 season, a campaign which saw the Blues finish second in the league and lose to Thamesmead Town in the playoff final. Dark made 28 appearances during the 2013–14 season, a campaign in which the Jammers finished out of the playoffs. In June 2014, Dark signed for a third season at the Wallace Binder Ground, but after making five early-season appearances, he departed the club in mid-September 2014.

=== Return to Grays Athletic ===
Dark re-signed for Isthmian League Premier Division club Grays Athletic in mid-September 2014. He made eight appearances before departing in January 2015.

=== Witham Town ===
Dark signed for Isthmian League Premier Division strugglers Witham Town in January 2015. He made 22 appearances in Town's unsuccessful attempt at retaining their Premier Division status and left at the end of the 2014–15 season.

=== VCD Athletic and Thamesmead Town ===
In May 2015, Dark joined Isthmian League Premier Division club VCD Athletic. He left the club before the beginning of the 2015–16 season and instead began the campaign with Isthmian League First Division North club Thamesmead Town. He remained at Bayliss Avenue until February 2016.

=== Heybridge Swifts ===
In late February 2016, Dark signed for Isthmian League First Division North club Heybridge Swifts. During the remainder of the 2015–16 season, he made eight appearances and was a part of the team which lost 1–0 to Concord Rangers in the 2016 Essex Senior Cup Final. During the 2017 off-season, Dark was announced as the new club captain and remained a regular in the team until he lost his place in February 2018, due to a foot injury. After making 101 appearances for the club, Dark's contract was terminated by mutual consent in April 2018.

=== Bishop's Stortford ===
On 8 June 2018, it was announced that Dark had joined Isthmian League Premier Division club Bishop's Stortford. He made 10 appearances and scored one goal before departing Woodside Park on 12 October 2018.

=== Return to Maldon & Tiptree ===
In mid-October 2018, Dark returned to Isthmian League North Division club Maldon & Tiptree on a contract until the end of the 2018–19 season. He made 24 appearances and helped the club to the 2019 Isthmian League North Division play-off Final, in which the Jammers were defeated on penalties by Heybridge Swifts. Dark left the club at the end of the season.

=== Grays Athletic (third spell) ===
On 4 June 2019, Dark returned to Isthmian League North Division club Grays Athletic for the third time and was announced as club captain. He made 41 appearances during the COVID-19-affected 2019–20 and 2020–21 seasons and 18 during 2021–22. Following his appointment as manager in April 2022, Dark stepped back from his playing role. A shortage of numbers saw him name himself as a substitute for a league match versus Lowestoft Town on 18 March 2023 and he remained unused during the 2–1 victory.

== Managerial career ==
On 25 April 2022, Dark was appointed manager of Isthmian League North Division club Grays Athletic. He presided over a 2022–23 season which ended with defeat in the North Division play-off semi-finals. He also guided the team to the final of the Essex Thame-Side Trophy, which was lost 3–2 to Bowers & Pitsea. Dark's resignation from the role was announced on 1 May 2023.

== Career statistics ==
Appearances and goals by club, season and competition
Club	Season	League			FA Cup		League Cup		Other		Total	
Club	Season	Division	Apps	Goals	Apps	Goals	Apps	Goals	Apps	Goals	Apps	Goals
Brentford	2006–07	League One	3	0	0	0	0	0	0	0	3	0
Brentford	2007–08	League Two	0	0	—		0	0	0	0	0	0
Brentford	Total		3	0	0	0	0	0	0	0	3	0
Ramsgate (loan)	2007–08	Isthmian League Premier Division	2	0	—		—		—		2	0
Wivenhoe Town	2008–09	Eastern Counties League Premier Division	1	0	—		—		—		1	0
Crawley Town	2008–09	Conference Premier	1	0	—		—		2 (Note: 1 appearance in Setanta Shield, 1 appearance in Sussex Senior Cup)	0	3	0
Fisher Athletic London	2008–09	Conference South	5	0	—		—		—		5	0
Redbridge	2011–12	Isthmian League First Division North	34	4	0	0	—		0	0	34	4
Maldon & Tiptree	2013–14	Isthmian League First Division North	27	1	1	0	—		0	0	28	1
Maldon & Tiptree	2014–15	Isthmian League First Division North	5	0	—		—		—		5	0
Maldon & Tiptree	Total		32	1	1	0	—		0	0	33	1
Grays Athletic	2014–15	Isthmian League Premier Division	4	0	—		—		4 (Note: 2 appearances in FA Trophy, 1 appearance in Isthmian League Cup, 1 appearance in Essex Senior Cup)	0	8	0
Witham Town	2014–15	Isthmian League Premier Division	22	0	—		—		—		22	0
Heybridge Swifts	2015–16	Isthmian League First Division North	7	0	—		—		1 (Note: Appearance in Essex Senior Cup)	0	8	0
Heybridge Swifts	2016–17	Isthmian League First Division North	33	0	3	1	—		2 (Note: 1 appearance in FA Trophy, 1 appearance in Isthmian League Cup)	0	38	1
Heybridge Swifts	2017–18	Isthmian League North Division	22	1	7	0	—		13 (Note: 9 appearances in FA Trophy, 3 appearances in Isthmian League Cup, 1 appearance in Essex Senior Cup)	0	42	1
Heybridge Swifts	Total		62	1	10	1	—		16	0	88	2
Bishop's Stortford	2018–19	Isthmian League Premier Division	10	1	0	0	—		0	0	10	1
Maldon & Tiptree	2018–19	Isthmian League North Division	20	0	—		—		4 (Note: 2 appearances in Isthmian League North Division play-offs, 1 appearance in Isthmian League Cup, 1 appearance in Essex Senior Cup)	0	24	0
Maldon & Tiptree	Total		52	1	1	0	—		4	0	57	0
Grays Athletic	2019–20	Isthmian League North Division	24	0	2	0	—		8 (Note: 3 appearances in Isthmian League Cup, 3 appearances in Essex Senior Cup, 2 appearances in FA Trophy)	0	34	0
Grays Athletic	2020–21	Isthmian League North Division	4	0	2	0	—		1 (Note: Appearance in FA Trophy)	0	7	0
Grays Athletic	2021–22	Isthmian League North Division	17	0	0	0	—		1 (Note: Appearance in Isthmian League Cup)	0	18	0
Grays Athletic	2022–23	Isthmian League North Division	0	0	0	0	—		0	0	0	0
Grays Athletic	Total		49	0	4	0	—		14	0	67	0
Career total			225	3	15	1	0	0	34	0	274	7

== Honours ==
Stansted

- Essex Senior League: 2009–10
- Essex Senior League Challenge Cup: 2010–11
