= John Mousinho =

English football manager (born 1986)

- Mousinho playing for Wycombe Wanderers in 2008

Personal information
- Full name: John Michael Lewis Mousinho
- Date of birth: 30 April 1986 (age 40)
- Place of birth: Isleworth, London, England
- Height: 6 ft 1 in (1.85 m)
- Positions: Centre-back; central midfielder

Team information
- Current team: Portsmouth (head coach)

Youth career
- 2002–2003: Chesham United

College career
Years	Team	Apps	(Gls)
2004–2005	Notre Dame Fighting Irish	12	(1)

Senior career*
Years	Team	Apps	(Gls)
2005–2008	Brentford	64	(2)
2005	→ Woking (loan)	0	(0)
2005	→ Slough Town (loan)	4	(1)
2006	→ Yeading (loan)	6	(0)
2008–2010	Wycombe Wanderers	73	(3)
2010–2012	Stevenage	57	(10)
2012–2014	Preston North End	26	(1)
2013–2014	→ Gillingham (loan)	4	(1)
2014	→ Stevenage (loan)	16	(1)
2014–2017	Burton Albion	121	(2)
2017–2023	Oxford United	119	(4)
Total		490	(25)

Managerial career
- 2023–: Portsmouth
- * Club domestic league appearances and goals

John Michael Lewis Mousinho (born 30 April 1986) is an English professional football manager and former footballer who is head coach of EFL Championship club Portsmouth. Primarily a central midfielder early in his career, he was later utilised as a centre-back.

Mousinho began his senior football career at Brentford, having previously played for Chesham United and Notre Dame Fighting Irish while studying at the University of Notre Dame. He spent two and a half years at Brentford before joining Wycombe Wanderers in June 2008, playing regularly for two seasons and experiencing both a promotion and relegation. He signed for Stevenage in June 2010, helping the club earn the second of back-to-back promotions and scoring the decisive goal in the 2011 League Two play-off final, finishing as the club's joint-top goalscorer for the season.

After an injury-affected 2011–12 season, Mousinho joined Preston North End, with loan spells at Gillingham and a return to Stevenage. He signed for Burton Albion in June 2014, winning the League Two title in his first season and achieving promotion to the Championship a year later. Mousinho moved to Oxford United in August 2017, making 151 appearances before retiring in January 2023. During the latter part of his playing career, he served as chairman of the PFA from May 2021 until January 2023, when he stepped down to become Portsmouth's head coach, leading the club to the Championship as League One champions in the 2023–24 season.

== Early life ==
Born in Isleworth, Greater London, Mousinho is of Portuguese descent, with his father's side of the family originating from Lisbon. He grew up supporting Tottenham Hotspur and cited Darren Anderton and Teddy Sheringham as his footballing heroes, influenced by the attacking football Tottenham played during the early 1990s.

== Career ==
=== Brentford ===
Mousinho was signed by Brentford manager Martin Allen during the 2005–06 season, having returned from the United States where he had been studying and playing football at the University of Notre Dame. He was recommended to the club by Allen's son, having previously played for Chesham United. Mousinho made his Brentford debut on 18 October 2005 in a 1–1 draw against Oxford United in the Football League Trophy, playing the full 90 minutes. He made his Football League debut two months later, appearing as a 76th-minute substitute in a 4–1 away win over Tranmere Rovers on 17 December 2005.

Mousinho joined Conference National club Woking on 9 November 2005, on a short-term loan intended to provide first-team experience. He did not play any matches for Woking and returned to Brentford after just two weeks. He was subsequently loaned to Isthmian League Premier Division club Slough Town, making his debut in a 2–1 away victory over Fisher Athletic, and scored his first goal for the club in a 3–2 victory over Bromley; Mousinho's goal came in the 58th minute as Slough came from two goals behind to win the match. In April 2006, he joined Conference South club Yeading on loan, where he made six appearances. Martin Allen described the series of loan spells as "positive" and "definitely not the end of his time at Brentford".

Mousinho featured more regularly during the 2006–07 season. Initially providing cover for regular right-back Kevin O'Connor, he was later deployed in a central midfield role. He was also the outfield player chosen to play as goalkeeper against Gillingham on 21 October 2006, when Clark Masters was sent off with no substitute goalkeeper available. Mousinho played 75 minutes in goal, helping the team earn a 2–2 draw. He made 39 appearances over the course of the season and was rewarded with a new contract running until June 2009. The following season, he scored his first goal for the club in a 2–1 victory against Barnet on 27 August 2007, converting the rebound from Kevin O'Connor's missed penalty. He played 24 times in all competitions. At the end of the 2007–08 season, manager Andy Scott placed Mousinho on the transfer list, stating he was not part of the club's future plans and would see limited first-team opportunities as a result.

=== Wycombe Wanderers ===
Mousinho's contract with Brentford was terminated by mutual consent on 16 June 2008, despite having one year remaining, and he joined Wycombe Wanderers later that day. Upon signing for Wycombe, Mousinho cited both the club's local significance to him and the chance to work under manager Peter Taylor as key factors in his decision. He made his debut for Wycombe in the club's opening match of the 2008–09 season, a 1–1 draw against Morecambe on 9 August 2008. He scored his first goal for the club a week later in a 2–0 away victory over Chester City. Wycombe activated a one-year extension clause in his contract on 7 October 2008, thereby retaining his services until 2010. He made 38 appearances in all competitions during his first season at Wycombe, scoring twice, as the club earned promotion to League One by finishing in the third and final automatic promotion place. He made a further 41 appearances during the 2009–10 season, scoring once, as Wycombe were relegated back to League Two. Over the course of his two-year spell at Wycombe, Mousinho played 79 times in all competitions, scoring three goals.

=== Stevenage ===
Mousinho rejected a contract extension at Wycombe, prompting manager Gary Waddock to comment: "We wanted to keep John, but he's decided to go elsewhere. It's an open secret where he's going." Mousinho signed for newly promoted League Two club Stevenage on a two-year deal, officially signing for the club on 1 July 2010. Mousinho made his Stevenage debut in the club's 1–0 defeat to Bradford City in the club's second game of the season on 14 August 2010, and scored his first goal in a 1–1 draw with Rotherham United on 9 October 2010. A month later, Mousinho scored twice in Stevenage's 3–0 victory away at local rivals Barnet. Mousinho received a straight red card in Stevenage's 2–0 defeat at Northampton Town on 30 April 2011, subsequently serving a three-match suspension. Stevenage appealed the decision, but were unsuccessful. Mousinho returned to the first team for the 2011 play-off final against Torquay United at Old Trafford on 28 May 2011, scoring the only goal of the match with a 20-yard strike in a 1–0 Stevenage victory. In his first season at Stevenage, Mousinho finished as the club's joint-top goalscorer, registering eight goals in 44 appearances.

Mousinho missed the first three matches of Stevenage's 2011–12 season due to a calf injury sustained during pre-season. He returned to the first team on 16 August 2011, starting in a 3–1 away victory against AFC Bournemouth, scoring Stevenage's second goal of the game from the penalty spot. Mousinho's second goal of the season came in Stevenage's 5–1 win against Sheffield Wednesday at Broadhall Way, in which he beat defender Rob Jones for pace before driving a 20-yard shot past goalkeeper Richard O'Donnell. He sustained a metatarsal injury to his right foot during Stevenage's 1–0 away victory against Hartlepool United in the FA Cup on 12 November 2011, and was subsequently ruled out of first-team action for six weeks. He suffered a further setback in January 2012, when scans revealed additional damage to the same metatarsal. He made 23 appearances during the season, scoring three goals. Three days after Stevenage's play-off semi-final defeat, on 17 May 2012, Mousinho declined an improved contract offer and chose to leave the club after two years.

=== Preston North End ===
Mousinho joined League One club Preston North End on a free transfer on 29 May 2012, signing a two-year contract. The move reunited him with former Stevenage manager Graham Westley. He was appointed club captain for the 2012–13 season. Mousinho made his Preston debut in the club's opening game of the season on 13 August 2012, playing the full 90 minutes as Preston defeated Championship team Huddersfield Town 2–0 at Deepdale. He scored his first goal for the club on 1 January 2013, a first-half header and the only goal in a 1–0 away win against Hartlepool United. Mousinho made 29 appearances during the season, scoring once.

Following the dismissal of Westley earlier in the year, Mousinho began the 2013–14 season with just three appearances in the opening three months of the season under new manager Simon Grayson. He was subsequently loaned to fellow League One club Gillingham on 7 November 2013, joining on a two-month loan agreement. Mousinho made his Gillingham debut a day after signing, playing in a 1–1 home draw with Brackley Town in the FA Cup. He scored the winning goal against his former club Stevenage on 26 November 2013, scoring in the 76th minute in a 3–2 victory. Mousinho sustained a hamstring injury four days later in a 4–1 defeat to Rotherham United and returned to his parent club prior to the end of the loan agreement. He made six appearances in his one-month stay at Gillingham.

After recovering from injury, Mousinho rejoined Stevenage on loan for the remainder of the season on 31 January 2014. The move marked the third occasion on which he had been signed by manager Graham Westley. He scored once during the loan spell, in a 3–1 victory against Tranmere Rovers on 8 March 2014. Mousinho made 16 appearances during the four-month loan as Stevenage were relegated to League Two at the end of the season. Mousinho was one of six players released by Preston on 20 May 2014.

=== Burton Albion ===
Following his release from Preston, Mousinho signed a two-year contract with League Two club Burton Albion on 6 June 2014. Manager Gary Rowett revealed that Mousinho had been the club's primary transfer target that summer. He made his Burton debut in the club's first match of the 2014–15 season, a 1–0 away victory against Oxford United. Mousinho scored his first goal for Burton in his fifth appearance, a second-half equaliser away at Newport County on 23 August 2014. He was appointed club captain during his first season, making 45 appearances as Burton achieved promotion to League One after finishing the season as League Two champions.

Mousinho's contract at Burton was extended by a further year on 15 October 2015. He played regularly during the 2015–16 season, making 48 appearances as Burton finished the season as runners-up in League One, meaning Mousinho had helped the club earn back-to-back promotions in his two seasons there. He made 32 appearances during the 2016–17 season as Burton remained in the Championship after finishing in 20th-place. Mousinho stated the subdued celebrations following survival highlighted the club's progress in recent years. He added: "In some ways it is more of an achievement than getting promoted, it is more of a stiff task to stay in the Championship than to get out of League One perhaps. It was a different feeling and one which will take a bit of time to sink in." During his three years at the club, Mousinho made 127 appearances and captained the club to consecutive promotions from League Two to the Championship.

=== Oxford United ===
Despite starting in Burton's first two matches of the 2017–18 season, Mousinho did not play again for the remainder of the month. He left Burton by mutual consent on 31 August 2017, signing a two-year deal with Oxford United on the same day. Burton manager Nigel Clough stated he had advised Mousinho: "If he had the opportunity to get a longer contract with a club which was also further south and that was the best thing for him then we wouldn't stand in his way. He has been a magnificent player for the club. It will be sad to lose him". He made his Oxford United debut in a 3–0 home victory over Gillingham on 9 September 2017. Following an injury to teammate Curtis Nelson, Mousinho was appointed club captain on 17 November 2017. He scored his first goal for Oxford in the club's final home match of the season, converting a penalty to equalise in an eventual 2–1 win against Rochdale on 28 April 2018. Mousinho made 44 appearances in all competitions during his first season with the club. He made a further 43 appearances during the 2018–19 season, scoring twice, as Oxford finished 12th in League One.

Mousinho made 33 appearances for Oxford during the 2019–20 season, before the regular season was curtailed because of the COVID-19 pandemic in March 2020. He signed a new one-year contract on 30 June 2020, allowing him to participate in Oxford's League One play-off matches, after the club finished fourth on an unweighted points-per-game calculation. He made one appearance in the play-offs, as Oxford were defeated by Wycombe Wanderers in the 2020 EFL League One play-off final on 13 July 2020. Managing a longstanding knee issue, Mousinho sustained a knee injury during an EFL Cup match against Watford in the opening month of the 2020–21 season. The injury ultimately ruled him out for six weeks, during which he joined manager Karl Robinson's first-team coaching staff. He suffered a recurrence of the injury in Oxford's 4–0 home victory against Northampton Town on 15 December 2020 and underwent surgery in January 2021, ruling him out for the remainder of the season. Having returned to pre-season training, Mousinho signed a new two-year contract with Oxford on 5 July 2021, taking on a dual role as player-coach. After making 151 appearances for the club across four seasons, Mousinho departed to take up the position of head coach at Portsmouth.

== Managerial career ==
=== Portsmouth ===
Mousinho was appointed head coach of League One club Portsmouth on 20 January 2023, marking his first managerial role. He signed a "long-term contract" with the club. Portsmouth chief executive Andrew Cullen stated Mousinho's leadership and motivational skills were key factors in his appointment. His first game in charge was a 2–0 victory against Exeter City at Fratton Park on 21 January 2023. At the time of his appointment, Portsmouth were positioned 15th in League One; the club went on to finish the 2022–23 season in 8th place after concluding the season with an 11-match unbeaten run.

Portsmouth's unbeaten run extended into the 2023–24 season and, after guiding the team to 13 points from the opening five matches, Mousinho was named EFL League One Manager of the Month for September 2023. He received the award for a second time in February 2024, after securing four wins from an unbeaten run of five matches, further consolidating the club's position at the top of the league table. Mousinho was named EFL League One Manager of the Season for 2023–24 at the EFL Awards on 14 April 2024. Two days later, Portsmouth secured promotion to the EFL Championship after being crowned League One champions.

A month into the 2024–25 season, on 20 September 2024, Mousinho signed an extension to his long-term contract with Portsmouth, alongside sporting director Rich Hughes. The duration of the extension was not disclosed. After failing to win any of their first nine league matches upon their return to the Championship, Portsmouth recorded their first league victory of the season with a 2–1 away win against Queens Park Rangers on 19 October 2024. Mousinho guided Portsmouth to a strong second half to the season to secure their Championship status, ultimately confirming safety with a 1–0 home win over Watford on 21 April 2025.

At the start of the 2025–26 season, Mousinho was the only manager among the 18 clubs remaining from the previous Championship campaign to have been in post since the start of 2024–25. Following four wins in their final six matches, Portsmouth finished 18th, eight points above the relegation zone. In May 2026, he attracted interest from Bristol City, although no formal approach was made beyond contact with his agent.

== Style of play ==
Mousinho spent the first decade of his senior career primarily being deployed as a central midfielder. During his time at Brentford, he also provided cover at right-back. He transitioned from midfield to central defence during his time at Burton Albion and featured in both positions during the 2016–17 season. Mousinho's leadership skills were consistently noted, having served as club captain at both Burton and Oxford United.

== Chairmanship of PFA ==
Mousinho was elected chairman of the newly formed Professional Footballers' Association (PFA) players' board in May 2021. He had previously served as a member of the PFA management committee, which had overseen a restructure of the organisation. Mousinho stepped down from his role as chairman in January 2023 following his appointment as head coach of Portsmouth.

== Personal life ==
He plays the guitar, and mostly likes listening to indie music.

== Career statistics ==
Appearances and goals by club, season and competition
Club	Season	League			FA Cup		League Cup		Other		Total	
Club	Season	Division	Apps	Goals	Apps	Goals	Apps	Goals	Apps	Goals	Apps	Goals
Brentford	2005–06	League One	7	0	1	0	0	0	1 (Note: Appearance(s) in EFL Trophy)	0	9	0
Brentford	2006–07	League One	34	0	1	0	2	0	2	0	39	0
Brentford	2007–08	League Two	23	2	0	0	1	0	0	0	24	2
Brentford	Total		64	2	2	0	3	0	3	0	72	2
Woking (loan)	2005–06	Conference National	0	0	0	0	—		0	0	0	0
Slough Town (loan)	2005–06	Southern League Division One Midlands	4	1	0	0	—		—		4	1
Yeading (loan)	2005–06	Isthmian Premier Division	6	0	—		—		—		6	0
Wycombe Wanderers	2008–09	League Two	34	2	2	0	1	0	1	0	38	2
Wycombe Wanderers	2009–10	League One	39	1	1	0	1	0	0	0	41	1
Wycombe Wanderers	Total		73	3	3	0	2	0	1	0	79	3
Stevenage	2010–11	League Two	38	7	4	0	0	0	2 (Note: One appearance in Football League Trophy; one appearance in 2011 League Two play-offs)	1	44	8
Stevenage	2011–12	League One	19	3	1	0	0	0	3 (Note: One appearance in Football League Trophy; two appearances in 2012 League One play-offs)	0	23	3
Stevenage	Total		57	10	5	0	0	0	5	1	67	11
Preston North End	2012–13	League One	24	1	2	0	2	0	1	0	29	1
Preston North End	2013–14	League One	2	0	0	0	0	0	1	0	3	0
Preston North End	Total		26	1	2	0	2	0	2	0	32	1
Gillingham (loan)	2013–14	League One	4	1	2	0	0	0	0	0	6	1
Stevenage (loan)	2013–14	League One	16	1	—		—		0	0	16	1
Burton Albion	2014–15	League Two	42	2	0	0	2	0	1	0	45	2
Burton Albion	2015–16	League One	46	0	1	0	1	0	0	0	48	0
Burton Albion	2016–17	Championship	32	0	0	0	0	0	—		32	0
Burton Albion	2017–18	Championship	1	0	0	0	1	0	—		2	0
Burton Albion	Total		121	2	1	0	4	0	1	0	127	2
Oxford United	2017–18	League One	40	1	1	0	—		3	0	44	1
Oxford United	2018–19	League One	35	2	4	0	2	0	2	0	43	2
Oxford United	2019–20	League One	26	0	1	0	3	0	4 (Note: Three appearances in EFL Trophy; one appearance in 2020 League One play-offs)	0	34	0
Oxford United	2020–21	League One	7	0	0	0	1	0	3	0	11	0
Oxford United	2021–22	League One	7	0	1	0	1	0	2	0	11	0
Oxford United	2022–23	League One	4	1	1	0	1	0	2	1	8	2
Oxford United	Total		119	4	8	0	8	0	16	1	151	5
Career total			490	25	23	0	19	0	28	2	560	27

== Managerial statistics ==
As of match played 21 November 2026

Managerial record by team and tenure
Team	From	To	Record				
Team	From	To	P	W	D	L	Win %
Portsmouth	20 January 2023	Present	189	75	54	60	39.7
Total			189	75	54	60	39.7

== Honours ==
=== Player ===
Stevenage

- Football League Two play-offs: 2011

Burton Albion

- Football League Two: 2014–15

=== Manager ===
Portsmouth

- EFL League One: 2023–24

Individual

- EFL League One Manager of the Month: September 2023, February 2024
- EFL League One Manager of the Season: 2023–24
- LMA League One Manager of the Year: 2023–24
