= Jo Kuffour =

English footballer (born 1981)

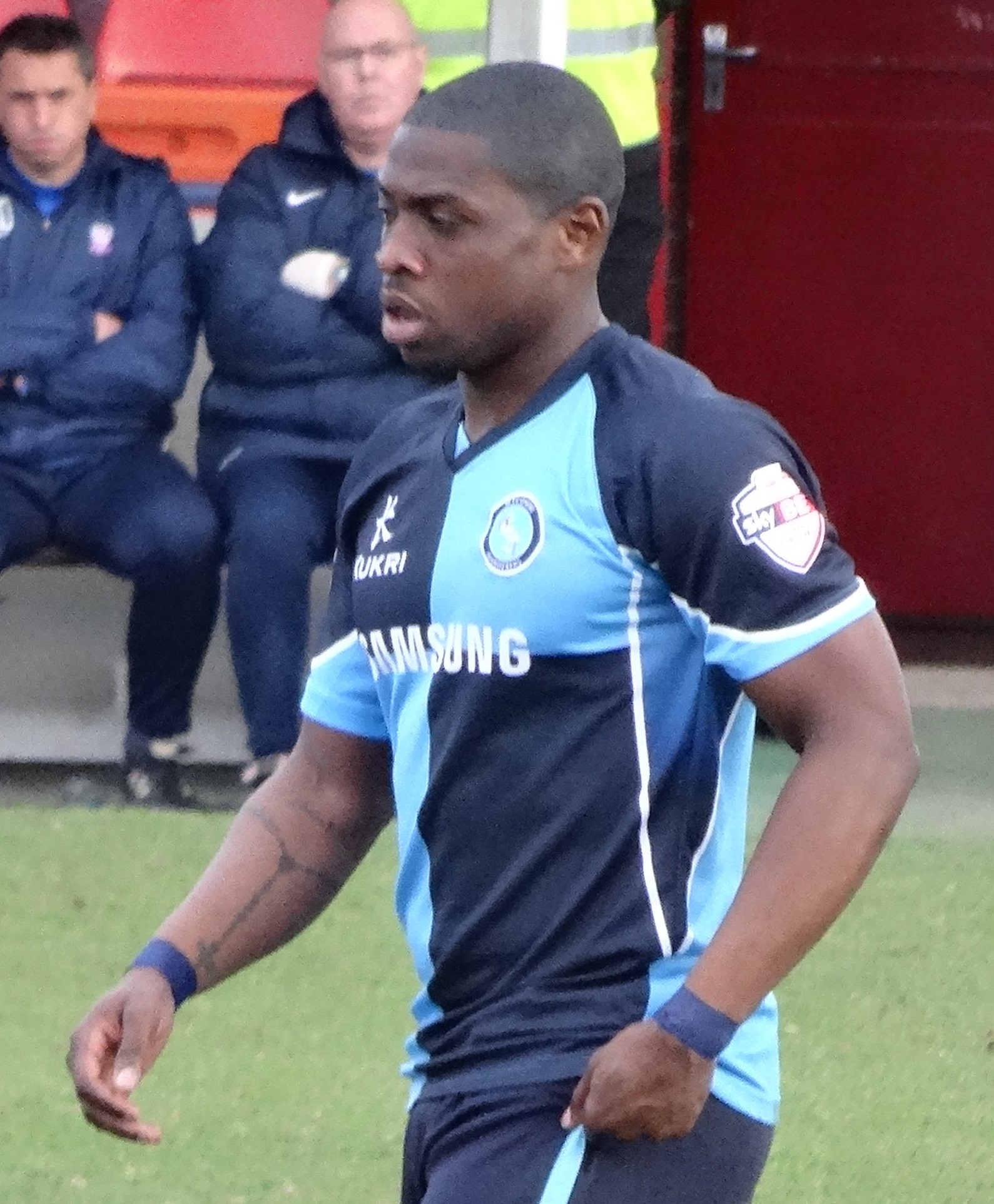
- Kuffour playing for Wycombe Wanderers in 2014

Personal information
- Full name: Jonathan Osei-Kuffour
- Date of birth: 17 November 1981 (age 44)
- Place of birth: Edmonton, England
- Height: 1.70 m (5 ft 7 in)
- Position: Forward

Youth career
- Arsenal

Senior career*
Years	Team	Apps	(Gls)
1998–2002	Arsenal	0	(0)
2001	→ Swindon Town (loan)	11	(2)
2002–2006	Torquay United	148	(30)
2006–2007	Brentford	39	(12)
2007–2008	AFC Bournemouth	44	(12)
2008–2012	Bristol Rovers	130	(32)
2011	→ Gillingham (loan)	12	(7)
2012	Gillingham	18	(2)
2012–2014	Wycombe Wanderers	56	(5)
2014	Sutton United	3	(0)
Total		460	(101)
- * Club domestic league appearances and goals

Jonathan Osei-Kuffour (born 17 November 1981), known as Jo Kuffour, is a former professional footballer who played as a forward.

Having come through the youth academy at Premier League side Arsenal, Kuffour notably had spells in the Football League with Torquay United, Brentford, AFC Bournemouth, Bristol Rovers and Wycombe Wanderers. He also played professionally for Swindon Town and Gillingham before finishing his career with non-league side Sutton United.

He was called up to represent Ghana in a friendly versus Nigeria on 6 February 2007, but was not included in the matchday squad and was never capped internationally.

== Club career ==
Born in Edmonton, Greater London, and after secondary school at St Ignatius' College, Enfield, he joined Arsenal as a trainee, winning the FA Youth Cup in 2000. He failed to break into the first team at Highbury and was allowed to join Swindon Town on loan in August 2001. His league debut came on 25 August as a substitute as Swindon lost 2–0 at home to Oldham Athletic. He left Arsenal at the end of the 2001–02 season and joined Torquay United, initially on non-contract terms, in October 2002, signing a contract in December 2002. His Torquay debut came as a substitute in the 4–1 home defeat to Hull City. He quickly became a regular in Leroy Rosenior's side, scoring 10 times in the 2003–04 side that won automatic promotion to the third tier of English football. He remained with Torquay, until 16 June 2006 when he joined Brentford on a free transfer, linking up again with Leroy Rosenior, despite having agreed to sign a new contract with Torquay earlier that month.

Kuffour's club form was rewarded with a call-up to the Ghana squad for the game against Nigeria on 6 February 2006. He was one of the few shining lights in a disastrous 2006–07 season for Brentford, top-scoring with 14 goals despite the team finishing bottom of the table. Kuffor went on to win Brentford's Player of the Year Award at the season's end.

Kuffour signed for AFC Bournemouth on 19 June 2007 on a Bosman free transfer, after rejecting a new contract offer from Brentford that would have made him the best paid player at the club. It was also revealed that he rejected a move to Huddersfield Town, because it was too far north and that he would only move north if it was to a Championship side.

On 29 August 2008, Bristol Rovers announced they had signed Kuffour on a three-year deal. He has made a massive impact at Rovers, including a volley at Leicester City and a last-minute equaliser against Leeds United. He finished the 2009–10 season as top scorer with 14 goals.

After a successful loan spell in which he scored seven goals for the Gills, including a hat-trick in the 4–3 win over Northampton Town and both goals as league leaders Crawley Town were beaten 2–1 on Boxing Day, Kuffour signed for Gillingham permanently until the end of the season. At the end of the season Kuffour was released with teammates Simon King and Garry Richards.

Kuffour was released from Wycombe Wanderers at the end of the 2013–14 season to join up with Sutton United where he eventually retired.

== International career ==
Kuffour was called into the Ghana squad for a friendly versus Nigeria on 6 February 2007, but was not included in the matchday squad.

== Career statistics ==
Appearances and goals by club, season and competition
Club	Season	League			FA Cup		League Cup		Europe		Other		Total	
Club	Season	Division	Apps	Goals	Apps	Goals	Apps	Goals	Apps	Goals	Apps	Goals	Apps	Goals
Arsenal	2000–01	Premier League	0	0	0	0	0	0	0	0	―		0	0
Swindon Town (loan)	2001–02	Second Division	11	2	0	0	1	0	―		1 (Note: Appearances in Football League Trophy)	0	13	2
Torquay United	2002–03	Third Division	29	5	2	1	―		―		1	0	32	6
Torquay United	2003–04	Third Division	41	10	0	0	1	0	―		1	0	43	10
Torquay United	2004–05	League One	34	6	0	0	1	1	―		1	1	36	8
Torquay United	2005–06	League Two	43	8	4	0	1	0	―		1	1	49	9
Torquay United	Total		147	29	6	1	3	1	―		4	2	160	33
Brentford	2006–07	League One	39	12	1	0	2	1	―		2	1	44	14
AFC Bournemouth	2007–08	League One	42	12	2	0	1	0	―		3	1	48	13
AFC Bournemouth	2008–09	League Two	2	0	―		1	1	―		0	0	3	1
AFC Bournemouth	Total		44	12	2		2	1	―		3	1	51	28
Bristol Rovers	2008–09	League One	41	11	1	0	―		―		0	0	42	11
Bristol Rovers	2009–10	League One	42	14	1	0	2	0	―		0	0	45	14
Bristol Rovers	2010–11	League One	42	6	1	0	1	0	―		2	3	46	9
Bristol Rovers	2011–12	League Two	5	1	0	0	1	0	―		―		6	1
Bristol Rovers	Total		130	32	3	0	4	0	―		2	3	139	35
Gillingham	2011–12	League Two	30	9	0	0	―		―		1	0	31	9
Wycombe Wanderers	2012–13	League Two	32	2	0	0	―		―		1	0	33	2
Wycombe Wanderers	2013–14	League Two	24	3	0	0	1	1	―		3	0	28	4
Wycombe Wanderers	Total		56	5	0	0	1	1	―		4	0	61	6
Sutton United	2014–15	Conference South	3	0	0	0	―		―		0	0	3	0
Career total			460	101	12	1	13	4	0	0	17	7	502	113

== Honours ==
Arsenal

- FA Youth Cup: 1999–00

Torquay United

- Football League Third Division third-place promotion: 2003–04

Individual

- Brentford Supporters' Player of the Year: 2006–07
