= Ivailo Dimitrov =

Bulgarian footballer

Personal information
- Date of birth: 8 January 1989 (age 37)
- Place of birth: Sofia, Bulgaria
- Height: 1.73 m (5 ft 8 in)
- Position: Midfielder

Youth career
- 2002–2004: Hendon
- 2004–2007: Brentford

Senior career*
Years	Team	Apps	(Gls)
2007	Hendon	2	(1)
2008–2009	Vihren Sandanski	10	(0)
2010	Maidenhead United	3	(0)
2010	→ Aylesbury United (dual-registration)	1	(0)
2010	Hayes & Yeading United	0	(0)
2011	Kingstonian	2	(0)
2011	Walton & Hersham	1	(0)
2011	Broxbourne Borough V & E	2	(2)
2011	Broxbourne Borough V & E	0	(0)
2011–2012	Aylesbury United	5	(2)
2012	Berkhamsted	2	(0)
2012	Hanwell Town	3	(0)
2012	Berkhamsted	1	(0)
- * Club domestic league appearances and goals

Ivailo Dimitrov (Bulgarian: Ивайло Димитров) (born 8 January 1989) is a retired Bulgarian footballer who played as a midfielder. He began his career in England in the youth systems at Hendon and Brentford and returned to Bulgaria to sign for A Group club Vihren Sandanski in 2008. Dimitrov made his professional debut with the club and returned to England in 2010, to end his career in non-League football.

== Club career ==
=== Hendon and Brentford ===
Born in Sofia, Bulgaria, Dimitrov began his career in England in the youth system at Isthmian League Premier Division club Hendon. He was named as Hendon's 2001–02 U13 Player Of The Year. Dimitrov joined the Centre of Excellence at Football League club Brentford in 2004 and was part of the Brentford youth team which beat Premier League club Arsenal (containing first team fringe players Nicklas Bendtner, Vito Mannone, Anthony Stokes and Alexandre Song) on penalties in the third round of the 2004–05 FA Youth Cup. Dimitrov signed a two-year scholarship deal in May 2005.

Dimitrov was included in Brentford's first team squads during the 2006–07 pre-season and scored in a friendly versus non-League club Harrow Borough. Dimitrov was released at the end of the 2006–07 season. He spent a week training with A Group club Levski Sofia and featured in a friendly versus Lokomotiv Plovdiv in October 2007, but was not offered a contract, despite being recommended to the club by Radostin Kishishev.

Dimitrov re-signed for Hendon in October 2007. He left made four appearances and scored one goal.

=== Vihren Sandanski ===
Dimitrov returned to Bulgaria and secured a move to A Group club Vihren Sandanski prior to the beginning of the 2008–09 season. He made 10 league appearances during an unsuccessful 2008–09 season, which saw the club suffer relegation to the B Group.

=== Non-League nomad ===
Dimitrov closed out his career in non-League football between 2010 and 2012, making a handful of appearances each for Conference South, Southern League and Spartan South Midlands League clubs Maidenhead United, Aylesbury United (two spells), Kingstonian, Walton & Hersham, Broxbourne Borough V & E, Berkhamsted (two spells) and Hanwell Town.

== International career ==
Dimitrov was capped by Bulgaria at youth level.

== Career statistics ==
Appearances and goals by club, season and competition
Club	Season	League			National Cup		Other		Total	
Club	Season	Division	Apps	Goals	Apps	Goals	Apps	Goals	Apps	Goals
Hendon	2007–08	Isthmian League Premier Division	2	1	0	0	2 (Note: 1 appearance in Isthmian League Cup, 1 appearance in Middlesex Senior Cup)	0	4	1
Vihren Sandanski	2008–09	Bulgarian A Group	10	0	0	0	—		10	0
Maidenhead United	2009–10	Conference South	3	0	—		1 (Note: Appearance in Berks & Bucks Senior Cup)	1	4	1
Aylesbury United (dual-registration)	2009–10	Southern League First Division Midlands	1	0	—		—		1	0
Kingstonian	2010–11	Isthmian League Premier Division	2	0	—		—		2	0
Walton & Hersham	2010–11	Isthmian League First Division South	1	0	—		—		1	0
Broxbourne Borough V & E	2010–11	Spartan South Midlands League Premier Division	2	2	0	0	—		2	2
Aylesbury United	2011–12	Spartan South Midlands League Premier Division	5	2	—		1 (Note: Appearance in Spartans South Midlands League Challenge Trophy)	1	6	3
Aylesbury United	Total		6	2	—		1	1	7	3
Berkhamsted	2011–12	Spartan South Midlands League Premier Division	2	0	—		—		2	0
Hanwell Town	2012–13	Spartan South Midlands League Premier Division	3	0	—		—		3	0
Berkhamsted	2012–13	Spartan South Midlands League Premier Division	1	0	1	0	—		2	0
Berkhamsted	Total		3	0	1	0	—		4	0
Career total			32	5	1	0	4	0	37	5
