= Ross Montague =

English footballer

Personal information
- Full name: Ross Philip Montague
- Date of birth: 1 November 1988 (age 38)
- Place of birth: Twickenham, England
- Height: 1.83 m (6 ft 0 in)
- Position: Forward

Youth career
- 2000–2007: Brentford

Senior career*
Years	Team	Apps	(Gls)
2007–2009	Brentford	14	(1)
2007	→ Sutton United (loan)	7	(3)
2007	→ Welling United (loan)	3	(1)
2008	→ Basingstoke Town (loan)	6	(3)
2009–2010	AFC Wimbledon	17	(2)
2010–2011	Basingstoke Town	0	(0)
- * Club domestic league appearances and goals

Ross Philip Montague (born 1 November 1988) is an English retired professional footballer who played in the Football League for Brentford as a forward. Successive cruciate ligament injuries ended his career at the age of 21.

== Career ==
=== Brentford ===
A forward, Montague entered the Centre of Excellence at Brentford at a young age. He embarked on a scholarship in 2005 and undertook an additional Advanced Apprenticeship in Sporting Excellence. Montague received his maiden call into the first team squad for a League One match versus Scunthorpe United on 3 March 2007 and he remained an unused substitute during the 2–0 defeat. After Brentford's relegation to League Two was confirmed in April 2007, Head of Youth Barry Quin took over as caretaker manager of the first team for the final four matches of the 2006–07 season and promoted a number of scholars into the first team squad. Montague appeared in each of the four matches as a second-half substitute and signed a one-year professional contract, with a one-year option, in June 2007.

After spells away on loan at Conference South clubs Sutton United and Welling United, Montague made his first appearance of the 2007–08 season as a 71st-minute substitute for Lee Thorpe during a 1–0 win over Lincoln City on 27 October 2007. He replaced Thorpe in the starting lineup under new manager Andy Scott in December 2007 and held onto his place until the end of January 2008. Montague scored his only senior goal for the club in a 3–0 win over Chester City on 29 December 2007. Despite suffering a season-ending back injury in February 2008, the one-year option on Montague's contract was taken up in April 2008.

After returning to fitness in August 2008, Montague managed just two appearances during the early months of the 2008–09 season, before suffering a season-ending cruciate ligament injury while training in December 2008. Montague's contract expired in June 2009, but he was invited to train with the club during the 2009–10 pre-season and prove he was fit enough to be awarded a new contract. Montague elected to leave the club in late August 2009 and made 16 appearances and scored one goal during just over two years as a first team player at Griffin Park.

=== AFC Wimbledon ===
On 27 August 2009, Montague joined newly-promoted Conference Premier club AFC Wimbledon on a one-year contract. He scored three goals in 20 appearances before suffering a season-ending cruciate ligament injury. Montague was released at the end of the 2009–10 season.

=== Return to Basingstoke Town ===
In July 2010, Montague returned to Basingstoke Town, where he had previously played on loan during the 2008–09 season, on a one-year contract. He suffered a season-ending cruciate ligament injury during the club's opening 2010–11 pre-season friendly, which ended his career.

== Personal life ==
After his retirement from football, Montague graduated from St Mary's University, Twickenham with Qualified Teacher Status. As of August 2018, he was Head of Sport at Broomfield House School, Kew and as of April 2021, he was head teacher of Hampstead Hill School. By January 2024, he was a governor of Hampstead Hill School and head teacher of Eaton House Belgravia.

== Career statistics ==
Appearances and goals by club, season and competition
Club	Season	League			FA Cup		League Cup		Other		Total	
Club	Season	Division	Apps	Goals	Apps	Goals	Apps	Goals	Apps	Goals	Apps	Goals
Brentford	2006–07	League One	4	0	0	0	0	0	0	0	4	0
Brentford	2007–08	League Two	10	1	—		0	0	0	0	10	1
Brentford	2008–09	League Two	0	0	0	0	0	0	2 (Note: Appearances in Football League Trophy)	0	2	0
Brentford	Total		14	1	0	0	0	0	2	0	16	1
Sutton United (loan)	2007–08	Conference South	7	3	—		—		—		7	3
Welling United (loan)	2007–08	Conference South	3	1	2	2	—		0	0	5	3
Basingstoke Town (loan)	2008–09	Conference South	5	2	0	0	—		0	0	5	2
AFC Wimbledon	2009–10	Conference Premier	17	2	0	0	—		3 (Note: 2 appearances in FA Trophy, 1 appearance and 1 goal in Surrey Senior Cup)	1	20	3
Career total			46	9	2	2	0	0	5	1	53	12
