= Fola Onibuje =

Nigerian professional footballer (born 1984)

Personal information
- Full name: Folawiyo Onibuje
- Date of birth: 25 September 1984 (age 42)
- Place of birth: Lagos, Nigeria
- Height: 6 ft 5 in (1.96 m)
- Position: Striker

Team information
- Current team: Ware

Youth career
- ?–2002: Charlton Athletic

Senior career*
Years	Team	Apps	(Gls)
2002–2004	Preston North End	0	(0)
2003	→ Huddersfield Town (loan)	2	(0)
2004–2005	Barnsley	3	(0)
2005	Peterborough United	2	(0)
2005–2006	Cambridge United	34	(9)
2006–2007	Swindon Town	14	(2)
2006	→ Brentford (loan)	2	(0)
2007	→ Wycombe Wanderers (loan)	1	(0)
2007	Wycombe Wanderers	4	(0)
2007	Shrewsbury Town	0	(0)
2007	St Albans City	1	(0)
2008	Macclesfield Town	1	(0)
2008	Accrington Stanley	4	(0)
2009	Weymouth	5	(0)
2009	Woking	2	(0)
2009–2010	Grays Athletic	10	(3)
2010	Southport	0	(0)
2010	Boreham Wood	0	(0)
2011–2012	Tooting & Mitcham United	0	(0)
2013–	Cheshunt	0	(0)
- * Club domestic league appearances and goals as of 12:32, 12 March 2010 (UTC)

Folawiyo "Fola" Onibuje (born 25 September 1984) is a Nigerian footballer who plays for Isthmian League Division One North club Cheshunt.

== Early life ==
Although born in Nigeria, he was educated at Chiswick Community School in West London.

== Career ==
He earned a contract with Cambridge United for the 2005–06 season after impressing with three goals in as many games in pre-season friendlies. This followed unsuccessful spells at Huddersfield Town, Barnsley, and Peterborough United F.C.; however, having established himself as a first-team player and regular goal scorer at Cambridge, he was released at the end of 2005–06.

Onibuje became Swindon manager Dennis Wise's second signing of the 2006 pre-season, signing a three-month contract that was later extended to a year in late August of the same year. He signed for Brentford on a two-month loan on 10 November 2006, to cover for injured target man Lloyd Owusu, after he was considered surplus to requirements by newly appointed Swindon boss Paul Sturrock. He was recalled by Swindon on 30 December 2006, but on 1 January 2007, he moved clubs again, this time to Wycombe Wanderers. He then signed for St. Albans City.

He was released by Wycombe Wanderers on 27 July 2007, with a year still remaining on his contract after failing to impress manager Paul Lambert. He was announced as a non-contract player for Shrewsbury Town on 10 August 2007; however, while he impressed, scoring in a reserve game, manager Gary Peters opted not to offer him a full-time contract and released him to find a new club.

After training with Conference North side Southport, he joined Macclesfield Town in February 2008 on non-contract forms to become Keith Alexander's first signing for the club. However, he was released after making only one substitute appearance for the Silkmen.

Onibuje joined Accrington Stanley at the beginning of the 2008–09 season but made just four substitute league appearances before manager John Coleman released him the following month. He has since had an unsuccessful trial at AFC Bournemouth. Joined Weymouth in March 2009 until the end of the season. He then moved on to Woking before signing for Grays Athletic on 15 October. He scored three goals in 10 Conference National appearances for the Grays before his release in January 2010.

He signed for Conference North club Southport in 2010, having previously been training with Bradford City.

Onibuje signed for Boreham Wood in October 2010. Before joining Isthmian League Premier Division club Tooting & Mitcham United in August 2011.
