= Football Academy =

2009 video game

- Developer(s): EA Canada
- Publisher(s): EA Sports
- Platform(s): Nintendo DS
- Release: EU: March 2009
- Genre(s): Sports trivia and card game
- Mode(s): Single player, Multiplayer

Football Academy is a football game released in 2009 for the Nintendo DS.

== Gameplay ==
The game begins with the player creating a new football team under the supervision of former Chelsea Football Club manager Luiz Felipe Scolari, who in the game serves as the "Academy Master". After demonstrating knowledge of the sport and building a team, players can enter their team in matches against real European teams, the results of which are statistically determined.

The game includes 14 minigames, "Football IQ" assessments, player collection, team building, and interactive matches. Players can also play matches and trade players with one another over Wi-Fi.

== Reception ==
The game received mixed reviews upon release and has a Metacritic score of 66/100 based on 12 reviews. Wesley Yin-Poole, writing for VideoGamer.com, praised the addictive nature of player collection and gave the game a score of 8/10.
