= Garry Richards =

English footballer

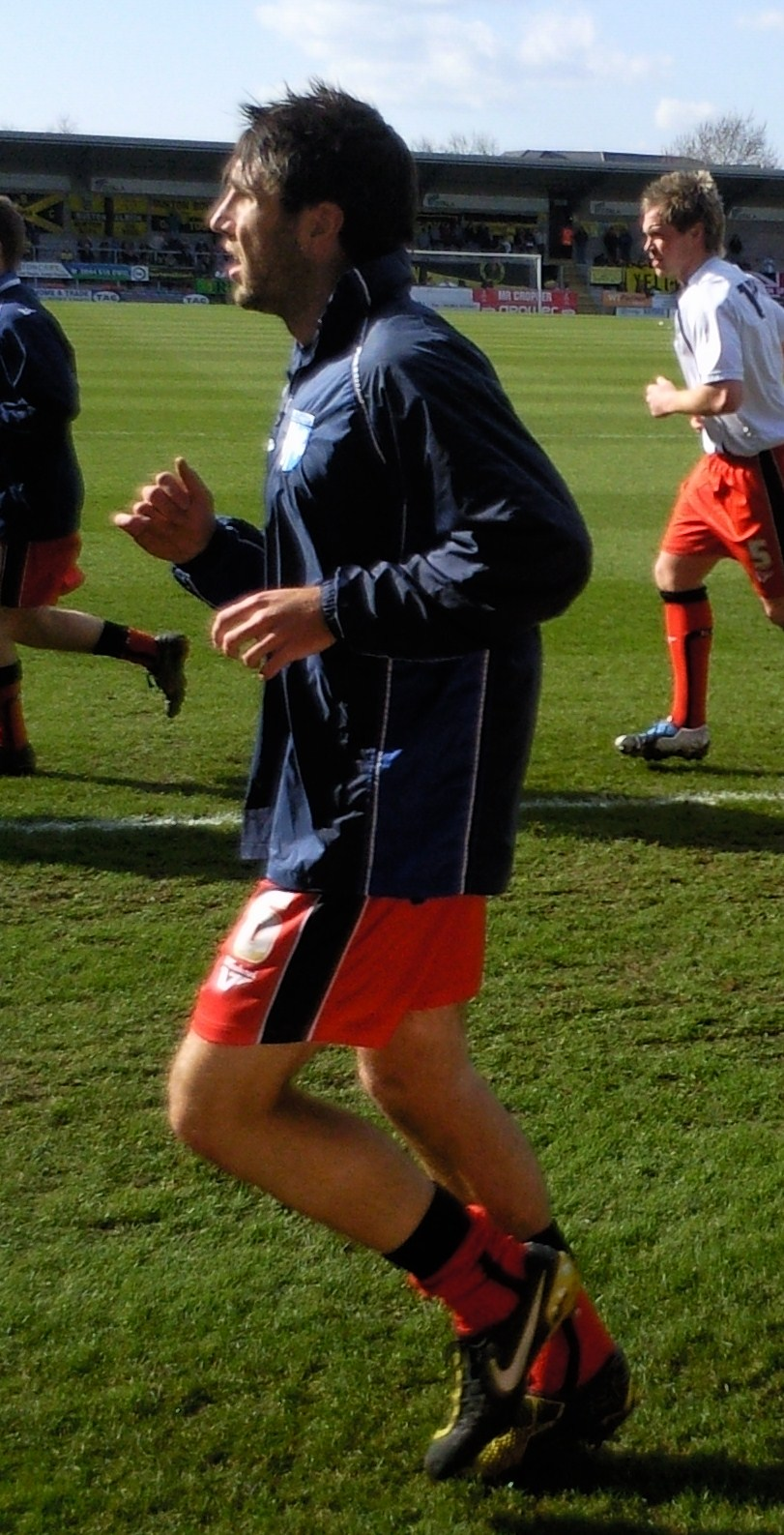
- Richards training with Gillingham in 2011.

Personal information
- Full name: Garry Richards
- Date of birth: 11 June 1986 (age 40)
- Place of birth: Romford, England
- Height: 6 ft 3 in (1.91 m)
- Position: Central defender

Youth career
- –2004: Colchester United

Senior career*
Years	Team	Apps	(Gls)
2004–2007	Colchester United	20	(1)
2005	→ Gravesend & Northfleet (loan)	0	(0)
2007	→ Brentford (loan)	10	(1)
2007–2008	Southend United	10	(0)
2008–2012	Gillingham	107	(4)
2012–2013	Luton Town	0	(0)
Total		147	(6)
- * Club domestic league appearances and goals

Garry Richards (born 11 June 1986) is an English retired professional footballer who made over 100 appearances as a central defender in the Football League for Gillingham. He also played for Colchester United, Southend United and Brentford.

== Career ==
=== Colchester United ===
A product of the youth system at Colchester United, Richards won his maiden call into the first team squad for a League One match versus Hartlepool United on 30 August 2004. He remained an unused substitute during the 2–1 defeat and had to wait until 3 September 2005 to make his debut, which came with a start in a 0–0 draw with Bristol City. He made 19 appearances during the 2005–06 season and helped the Us to automatic promotion to the Championship. Despite scoring his first goal for the club with the only goal of the game versus Preston North End on 30 January 2007, Richards was largely out of favour during the 2006–07 season and spent two months away on loan. Richards departed Layer Road in August 2007, after making 24 appearances and scoring one goal for the club.

==== Gravesend & Northfleet (loan) ====
On 29 January 2005, Richards joined Conference Premier club Gravesend & Northfleet on a one-month loan. He failed to make an appearance before his loan expired.

==== Brentford (loan) ====
On 9 February 2007, Richards joined League One strugglers Brentford on a one-month loan, which was later extended until the end of the 2006–07 season. He made 10 appearances and scored one goal, which came with the opener in a 2–2 draw with Oldham Athletic on 25 March, before his spell came to an end due to a pelvic injury suffered during a match versus Cheltenham Town on 7 April.

=== Southend United ===
Richards joined League One club Southend United on a two-year contract for an undisclosed fee on 4 August 2007. After making just 14 appearances during the first half of the 2007–08 season, Richards departed Roots Hall on 25 January 2008.

=== Gillingham ===
On 25 January 2008, Richards joined League One strugglers Gillingham on a 2 1/2-year contract for an undisclosed fee. At the end of the 2008–09 season, he was part of the team which secured promotion back to League One with victory in the 2009 League Two play-off final. Despite suffering ankle ligament damage and a broken toe in April 2010, Richards signed a new two-year contract in July 2010, but his Gillingham career was ultimately ended by a fractured fibula suffered during a 3–1 victory over Barnet on 6 March 2012. Richards was released in May 2012 and made 122 appearances and scored six goals during 4 1/2 seasons at Priestfield.

=== Luton Town ===
On 25 June 2012, Richards dropped into non-League football to join Conference Premier club Luton Town on a two-year contract. Richards' time at Kenilworth Road was beset by injury and despite multiple operations and extensive periods of rehabilitation on an injured ankle, he failed to win a call into a squad before his contract was mutually terminated on 14 October 2013. Richards' departure signalled his retirement from football.

== Honours ==
Colchester United

- Football League One second-place promotion: 2005–06

Gillingham

- Football League Two play-offs: 2009

== Career statistics ==
Appearances and goals by club, season and competition
Club	Season	League			FA Cup		League Cup		Other		Total	
Club	Season	Division	Apps	Goals	Apps	Goals	Apps	Goals	Apps	Goals	Apps	Goals
Colchester United	2004–05	League One	0	0	0	0	0	0	0	0	0	0
Colchester United	2005–06	League One	15	0	1	0	0	0	3 (Note: Appearances in Football League Trophy)	0	19	0
Colchester United	2006–07	Championship	5	1	0	0	0	0	0	0	5	1
Colchester United	Total		20	1	1	0	0	0	3	0	24	1
Gravesend & Northfleet (loan)	2004–05	Conference Premier	0	0	—		—		—		0	0
Brentford (loan)	2006–07	League One	10	1	—		—		—		10	1
Southend United	2007–08	League One	10	0	1	0	2	0	1	0	14	0
Gillingham	2007–08	League One	14	1	—		—		—		14	1
Gillingham	2008–09	League Two	36	2	3	0	1	0	4 (Note: 3 appearances in League Two play-offs, 1 appearance in Football League Trophy)	0	44	2
Gillingham	2009–10	League One	16	0	0	0	1	0	2	0	19	0
Gillingham	2010–11	League Two	17	0	0	0	0	0	0	0	17	0
Gillingham	2011–12	League Two	24	1	3	1	0	0	1	1	28	3
Gillingham	Total		107	4	6	1	2	0	7	1	122	6
Career total			147	6	8	1	4	0	11	1	170	8
