= Karle Carder-Andrews =

English footballer (born 1989)

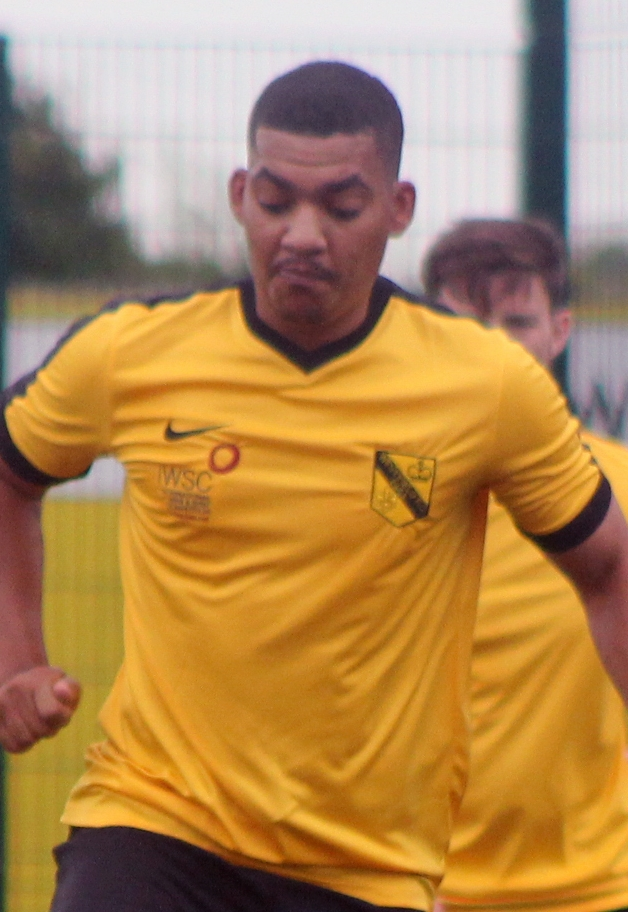
- Carder-Andrews playing for Westfield (Surrey) in 2017.

Personal information
- Full name: Karle Carder-Andrews
- Date of birth: 13 March 1989 (age 37)
- Place of birth: Feltham, England
- Height: 5 ft 11 in (1.80 m)
- Position: Midfielder

Youth career
- 2002–2006: Brentford

Senior career*
Years	Team	Apps	(Gls)
2006–2008	Brentford	5	(0)
2007	→ Margate (loan)	3	(0)
2008–2011	Egham Town	93	(2)
2011–2013	Hampton & Richmond Borough	33	(1)
2013	Chipstead	3	(0)
2013	Sandhurst Town	10	(8)
2013–2014	Hampton & Richmond Borough	39	(2)
2014–2016	Bedfont & Feltham	29	(8)
2016	Cove	6	(3)
2016–2018	Westfield (Surrey)	74	(41)
2018–2020	Hanworth Villa	21	(3)
2021–2022	Farnham Town	6	(2)
2023	Merstham	1	(0)
2024	Feltham	15	(1)
- * Club domestic league appearances and goals as of 13:07, 9 June 2025 (UTC)

Karle Carder-Andrews (born 13 March 1989), sometimes known as Karle Carder or Karle Andrews, is an English semi-professional footballer who plays as a midfielder.

Carder-Andrews began his career in the Football League with Brentford, before dropping into non-League football upon his release in 2008.

== Career ==
=== Brentford ===
A midfielder, Carder-Andrews began his career in the Centre Of Excellence at Brentford in 2002. He was part of a Brentford youth team which beat Arsenal in the third round of the 2004–05 FA Youth Cup.

Carder-Andrews signed his first professional contract in August 2006 and received his maiden call into the first team squad for a League One match versus Leyton Orient on 9 September 2006. He made his professional debut when he replaced Karleigh Osborne after 66 minutes of the 1–1 draw. Carder-Andrews continued to receive calls into the first team squad throughout September and October and made his first start in a Football League Trophy first round match against Northampton Town on 17 October. He played the full 120 minutes of the shootout win. Following the sacking of manager Leroy Rosenior and the appointment of Scott Fitzgerald in November 2006, Carder-Andrews managed just two more substitute appearances during the 2006–07 season, which ended with the Bees suffering relegation to League Two.

Under new manager Terry Butcher, Carder-Andrews failed to receive a call into the first team squad during the 2007–08 season and he joined Isthmian League Premier Division club Margate on a one-month loan on 22 September 2007. He returned to Brentford when his loan expired, after making six appearances. Carder-Andrews was released by Brentford on 11 January 2008 and made six appearances during his 18 months as a professional.

=== Egham Town ===
Following a break from football, Carder-Andrews joined Combined Counties League Premier Division club Egham Town in August 2008. He made 40 appearances during the 2008–09 season and scored one goal. The Sarnies found their form in the 2009–10 season, finishing fourth, with Carder-Andrews making 28 appearances and scoring two goals. A mid-table season followed in 2010–11, with Carder-Andrews making 31 appearances and scoring two goals. He departed the club in October 2011, having made 99 appearances and scored five goals during just over three years at the Runnymede Stadium.

=== Hampton & Richmond Borough ===
Carder-Andrews joined Conference South club Hampton & Richmond Borough in October 2011. He made 25 appearances and scored one goal during the 2011–12 season, but despite winning the 2011–12 Middlesex Senior Cup, the Beavers suffered relegation to the Isthmian League Premier Division. Carder-Andrews committed to the club for the 2012–13 season by signing a new contract in June 2012. Carder-Andrews made only 8 senior appearances during the 2012–13 season before departing in February 2013, due to budget concerns and a lack of game time.

=== Later career ===
Between 2013 and 2016, Carder-Andrews moved around the Isthmian and Combined Counties Leagues and played for Chipstead, Sandhurst Town, Bedfont & Feltham, Cove, in addition to a second spell with Hampton & Richmond Borough. He joined Combined Counties League Premier Division club Westfield (Surrey) in April 2016 and helped the team win promotion to the Isthmian League South Central Division during the 2017–18 season. Carder-Andrews dropped back down to the Combined Counties League Premier Division to join Hanworth Villa in December 2018, with whom he remained until the 2019–20 season was curtailed by the COVID-19 pandemic.

Carder-Andrews returned to football with Combined Counties League Premier Division South club Farnham Town in December 2021. During the remainder of the 2021–22 season, he scored three goals in seven appearances. Carder-Andrews began the 2023–24 season with Isthmian League South East Division club Merstham and played the final months of the season with Middlesex County League Premier Division club Feltham.

== Career statistics ==
As of match played 9 November 2024

Appearances and goals by club, season and competition
Club	Season	League			National cup (Note: Includes FA Cup)		League cup (Note: Includes EFL Cup)		Other		Total	
Club	Season	Division	Apps	Goals	Apps	Goals	Apps	Goals	Apps	Goals	Apps	Goals
Brentford	2006–07	League One	5	0	0	0	0	0	1 (Note: Appearance in Football League Trophy)	0	6	0
Margate (loan)	2007–08	Isthmian League Premier Division	3	0	2	0	—		1 (Note: Appearance in Isthmian League Cup)	0	6	0
Egham Town	2008–09	Combined Counties League Premier Division	39	1	0	0	—		1 (Note: Appearance(s) in Combined Counties League Premier Challenge Cup)	0	40	1
Egham Town	2009–10	Combined Counties League Premier Division	26	1	0	0	—		2	1	28	2
Egham Town	2010–11	Combined Counties League Premier Division	28	0	0	0	—		3	2	31	2
Egham Town	Total		93	2	0	0	—		6	3	99	5
Hampton & Richmond Borough	2011–12	Conference South	19	1	—		—		4 (Note: Appearance(s) in FA Trophy)	0	23	1
Sandhurst Town	2012–13	Combined Counties League Premier Division	10	8	—		—		—		10	8
Hampton & Richmond Borough	2013–14	Isthmian League Premier Division	28	1	4	0	—		4 (Note: 3 appearances in FA Trophy, 1 appearance in Isthmian League Cup)	0	36	1
Hampton & Richmond Borough	2014–15	Isthmian League Premier Division	11	1	1	0	—		0	0	12	1
Hampton & Richmond Borough	Total		58	3	5	0	—		8	0	71	3
Bedfont & Feltham	2014–15	Combined Counties League First Division	14	4	—		—		5 (Note: 3 appearances in Combined Counties League First Division Challenge Cup, 2 appearances in Southern Combination Cup)	1	19	5
Bedfont & Feltham	2015–16	Combined Counties League First Division	15	4	4	0	—		4 (Note: 2 appearances and 1 goal in Middlesex Premier Cup, 1 appearance in Combined Counties League Premier Challenge Cup, 1 appearance in Combined Counties League First Division Challenge Cup)	1	23	5
Bedfont & Feltham	Total		29	8	4	0	—		9	2	0	0
Cove	2015–16	Combined Counties League Premier Division	6	3	—		—		—		6	3
Westfield (Surrey)	2015–16	Combined Counties League Premier Division	9	3	—		—		—		9	3
Westfield (Surrey)	2016–17	Combined Counties League Premier Division	23	9	0	0	—		3	1	26	10
Westfield (Surrey)	2017–18	Combined Counties League Premier Division	33	23	0	0	—		0	0	33	23
Westfield (Surrey)	2018–19	Isthmian League South Central Division	9	6	0	0	—		1	0	10	6
Westfield (Surrey)	Total		74	41	0	0	—		4	1	78	42
Hanworth Villa	2018–19	Combined Counties League Premier Division	10	1	—		—		—		10	1
Hanworth Villa	2019–20	Combined Counties League Premier Division	11	2	0	0	—		2	0	13	2
Hanworth Villa	Total		21	3	0	0	—		2	0	23	3
Farnham Town	2021–22	Combined Counties League Premier Division South	6	2	—		—		1 (Note: Appearance in Aldershot Senior Cup)	1	7	3
Merstham	2023–24	Isthmian League South East Division	1	0	—		—		1	0	2	0
Feltham	2023–24	Middlesex County League Premier Division	9	0	—		—		—		9	0
Feltham	2024–25	Middlesex County League First Division South & West	6	1	—		—		—		6	1
Feltham	Total		15	1	—		—		—		15	1
Career total			321	68	11	0	0	0	32	7	364	75

== Honours ==
Hampton & Richmond Borough

- Middlesex Senior Cup: 2011–12

Bedfont & Feltham

- Combined Counties League First Division Cup: 2014–15

Westfield (Surrey)

- Combined Counties League Premier Division: 2017–18
