= Samvo Group =

Samvo Group (2004 – 2017) specialized in program trading, bookmaking, sports betting brokerage services, betting cafés, igaming and peer-to-peer gaming. Samvo Group had offices located in London, Guernsey and Hong Kong.

== History ==
Founded in 2004 by Frank Chan, the company originally began as a telephone bookmaking operator and grew to offer online sports betting, casino and poker products. With headquarters in London and offering competitive prices on their Asian Handicap market, Samvo offered a blend of Asian and European betting styles.

In 2005, the company launched its first online portal, SamvoBetBroker.com, a sports betting brokerage for both clients and professional betting syndicates. In 2006, Samvo Group began development of quantitative models and automated trading, which was developed in 2008, followed by the launch of a semi-automated trading platform in 2009. The automated trading system combined Samvo Group's brokerage, bookmaking and program trading operations into one exchange.

In 2014 Samvo Group launched its automated betting portal, Samvo Bethub.

== Licenses ==
Samvo Group held gaming licenses in the United Kingdom, Curacao and Alderney. Samvo also held licenses with the United Kingdom Gambling Commission (UKGC) and the Curacao Gaming Commission.
