= Clark Masters =

English footballer (born 1987)

Personal information
- Full name: Clark John Masters
- Date of birth: 31 May 1987 (age 39)
- Place of birth: Hastings, England
- Height: 6 ft 3 in (1.91 m)
- Position: Goalkeeper

Youth career
- Brighton & Hove Albion
- Gillingham
- –2006: Brentford

Senior career*
Years	Team	Apps	(Gls)
2004–2008	Brentford	12	(0)
2005	→ Redbridge (loan)	8	(0)
2005–2006	→ Slough Town (loan)	23	(0)
2007	→ AFC Wimbledon (loan)	5	(0)
2007	→ Welling United (loan)	4	(0)
2008–2009	Southend United	0	(0)
2008	→ Stevenage Borough (loan)	3	(0)
2009–2010	Aldershot Town	1	(0)
2010	Hayes & Yeading United	15	(0)
2010	Hastings United	15	(0)
2010–2011	Barrow	25	(0)
2011–2012	Eastbourne Borough	13	(0)
2012–2013	Havant & Waterlooville	39	(0)
2013–2014	Tonbridge Angels	16	(0)
2021	Sidley United	1	(0)
2021–2022	Billericay Town	0	(0)
Total		180	(0)
- * Club domestic league appearances and goals

Clark John Masters (born 31 May 1987) is an English goalkeeper who plays for National League South side Billericay Town.

Starting his career with Brentford in 2004, he moved on to Southend United four years later, and Aldershot Town in 2009. He has had several loan spells at non-league clubs.

== Early life ==
As a youngster, Masters attended William Parker School in Hastings, the same school that produced England midfielder Gareth Barry.

== Playing career ==
=== Brentford ===
After a youth career with Brighton & Hove Albion and Gillingham, Masters began a scholarship with Brentford in 2003. In 2005 and 2006 he had loan spells with non-league clubs Redbridge and Slough Town. He signed professional forms with Brentford in June 2006.

He made his Brentford debut against Blackpool in the first game of the 2006–07 season, stepping in for Stuart Nelson, who was suspended. On his third appearance, a 2–2 draw with Gillingham on 21 October, he was sent off for "denial of an obvious goalscoring opportunity". Though the club successfully appealed the suspension. Rumours circulated that the young keeper would be signed up by Premier League side Arsenal. In March 2007, Masters joined AFC Wimbledon in a one-month loan deal. He played five games for the Dons, keeping two clean sheets, before returning to Brentford.

Signing a new two-year deal in July 2007, he embarked on another loan spell the next month, this time with Welling United. He played four games.

=== Southend United ===
Masters joined Football League One side Southend United on 11 January 2008, and was immediately loaned out to Conference National side Stevenage Borough. He never played a competitive game for Southend, and had a trial with Grimsby Town, in an attempt to find regular football.

=== Aldershot Town ===
In July 2009, Masters joined Aldershot Town on a one-year deal, as a replacement for outgoing Nikki Bull. On 1 February, Masters was released by Aldershot Town and immediately signed for Conference National side Hayes & Yeading United.

=== Barrow ===
On 5 November 2010, Masters joined Barrow on non-contract terms. He was injured while trialling with Millwall, but returned to action a few weeks later. He was Barrow's first-choice keeper for the remainder of the season. He left in May 2011, however, due to the travelling distance between his home and Barrow.

=== Eastbourne Borough ===
Masters joined Eastbourne Borough on 16 June 2011.

=== Havant & Waterlooville ===
At the end of July 2012 he joined Havant & Waterlooville after a trial period with the club. He signed for fellow Conference South team Tonbridge Angels in May 2013 to replace longtime Angels' goalkeeper Lee Worgan.

=== Sidley United ===
In September 2021, Masters made an appearance for Mid-Sussex League Premier Division club Sidley United.

=== Billericay Town ===
On 26 November 2021, Masters signed for National League South side Billericay Town.
