= Charlie Ide =

English footballer (born 1988)

Personal information
- Full name: Charlie Joe Ide
- Date of birth: 10 May 1988 (age 38)
- Place of birth: Sunbury, England
- Height: 5 ft 9 in (1.75 m)
- Position: Striker

Youth career
- 1998–2005: Brentford

Senior career*
Years	Team	Apps	(Gls)
2005–2008	Brentford	46	(7)
2006	→ Slough Town (loan)	8	(1)
2006	→ Sutton United (loan)	6	(4)
2008	→ Lewes (loan)	4	(0)
2008	Grays Athletic	7	(0)
2008	Wivenhoe Town	8	(12)
2008–2009	Croydon Athletic	?	(?)
2009	Carshalton Athletic	?	(?)
2009	Chertsey Town	?	(?)
2010	Bedfont Green	?	(?)
2010	Carshalton Athletic	?	(?)
2010	Hayes & Yeading United		
2010–2011	Walton Casuals	26	(12)
2011	Bromley	?	(?)
2011–2012	Walton Casuals	14	(7)
2012	Merstham	0	(0)
2012	North Greenford United	1	(1)
2013–????	Staines Lammas		
- * Club domestic league appearances and goals as of 13:07, 19 November 2012 (UTC)

Charlie Joe Ide (born 10 May 1988) is an English former professional footballer who began his career at Brentford.

== Career ==
Ide is a striker who made his debut for Brentford in a 2–1 win over Hull City in May 2005. He had loan spells at Slough Town towards the end of the 2005–06 season and at Sutton United the following 2006–07 season. He was recalled from his loan spell at Sutton and soon found himself in Brentford's first team. He scored his first professional goal against Tranmere Rovers in December 2006 and continued his good form by scoring both goals in the 2–2 draw with Leyton Orient the following month. It was in this game where he earned the nickname of 'The Squirrel', when at a Brentford corner a squirrel turned up on the pitch and ran the length of The New Road Stand, play was delayed, and when restarted Ide scored from the resulting corner.

Ide was generally played on the right wing in the 2006–07 season, yet still managed seven goals in 26 league games.

On 30 May 2007, despite reported interest from higher division clubs, Ide signed a new two-year deal with Brentford, with the option of a further year.

Ide was sent on loan to Conference South side Lewes for the final three months of the 2007–08 season, after failing to regain his place in the Brentford first team following injury.

He was not tendered a new contract by Brentford manager Andy Scott following the season's end. On 22 May 2008, Grays Athletic announced that Ide had signed a one-year deal with the Conference National team. Ide left Grays Athletic by mutual consent on 25 September 2008, after just seven appearances, and dropped four divisions to sign for Wivenhoe Town the following day. In eight days in October 2008, he scored hat-tricks in three successive matches, against Stanway Rovers, Whitton United and Brantham Athletic.

He signed for Isthmian League Premier Division club Carshalton Athletic from Croydon Athletic on 27 February 2009, preferring a move there rather than AFC Wimbledon.

In January 2010 he signed for Bedfont Green. In February 2010 he resigned for Carshalton Athletic. Having started the 2010–11 season with Walton Casuals, he signed for Bromley in March 2011.

In July, he re-signed for Walton Casuals.

In November 2012, he joined Merstham on a free transfer, later playing a solitary appearance for North Greenford United, teaming up with his former boss Neil Shipperley who he played under at Walton Casuals. Ide signed for Combined Counties Division One side Staines Lammas in December 2013 and scored on his debut against Farleigh Rovers.
