= Sparta Youth Academy =

Coordinates: 51°55′10″N 4°26′01″E

- Full name: Sparta Rotterdam Youth Academy
- Founded: 1 April 1888
- Ground: Het Kasteel, Rotterdam
- Capacity: 11,926
- Chairman: (Netherlands) Rob Westerhof
- Manager: (Netherlands) Dolf Roks
- Website: www.opleidingsparta.nl
Home colours	Away colours

The Sparta Youth Academy is a football youth academy based in Rotterdam, Netherlands, from where the organization manages a total of 13 youth teams (ages 7–18). The academy is the primary youth clinic of Dutch football club Sparta Rotterdam, the oldest professional football club in the Netherlands.

The Academy received the four star academic sports certification, the highest possible rating for sports academies in the Netherlands, having won the best National football academy award on several occasions.

== History ==
The Sparta youth system is famous for having produced and still producing many great Dutch internationals such as: Danny Blind, Danny Koevermans, David Mendes da Silva, Ed de Goey, Winston Bogarde, Henk Fräser, Jan van Beveren, Jetro Willems, John de Wolf, Kevin Strootman, Kew Jaliens, Luuk Balkestein, Pim Doesburg, and Nick Viergever.

In 2011, Sparta Rotterdam expanded its educational partnerships by collaborating with Erasmus University Rotterdam to offer a degree program in Sports Marketing for academy players. In 2013, the academy received a four-star certification from the Royal Dutch Football Association (KNVB).

Since 2009, the academy has also worked with Zadkine College to provide vocational training programs in Sport & Exercise for its youth players.

== Notable former players ==
- (Aruba) David Abdul
- (Netherlands) Luuk Balkestein
- (Netherlands) Jan van Beveren
- (Curaçao) Sendley Bito
- (Netherlands) Danny Blind
- (Netherlands) Winston Bogarde
- (Morocco) Rachid Bouaouzan
- (Morocco) Nourdin Boukhari
- (Netherlands) Memphis Depay
- (Netherlands) Pim Doesburg
- (Netherlands) Lerin Duarte
- (Netherlands) Marvin Emnes
- (Netherlands) Erik Falkenburg
- (Netherlands) Henk Fräser
- (Netherlands) Anwar El Ghazi
- (Netherlands) Joey Godee
- (Netherlands) Ed de Goey
- (Netherlands) Kew Jaliens
- (Netherlands) Danny Koevermans
- (Netherlands) Mimoun Mahi
- (Wales) James Lawrence
- (Netherlands) Marten de Roon
- (Netherlands) David Mendes da Silva
- (Netherlands) Kevin Strootman
- (Netherlands) Nick Viergever
- (Suriname) Marvin Wijks
- (Netherlands) Georginio Wijnaldum
- (Netherlands) Giliano Wijnaldum
- (Netherlands) Jetro Willems
- (Netherlands) John de Wolf

== Teams ==
Youth teams

Level	Team	Age	League	Cup	International
A-juniors	A1	-19	Nike Eredivisie	A-juniors Cup	UEFA Youth League
A-juniors	A2	-19	.A-juniors Eerste Divisie	A-juniors Cup	
B-juniors	B1	-17	B-juniors Eredivisie	B-juniors Cup	
B-juniors	B2	-17	.B-juniors Eerste Divisie	B-juniors Cup	—
C-juniors	C1	-15	C-juniors Eredivisie	C-juniors Cup	—
C-juniors	C2	-15	.C-juniors Eerste Divisie	C-juniors Cup	—
D-pupils	D1	-13	D-pupils Eredivisie	D-pupils Cup	—
D-pupils	D2	-13	.D-pupils Eerste Divisie	D-pupils Cup	—
D-pupils	D3	-13	.D-pupils Tweede Divisie	D-pupils Cup	—
E-pupils	E1	-11	E-pupils Eredivisie	E-pupils Cup	—
E-pupils	E2	-11	.E-pupils Eerste Divisie	E-pupils Cup	—
E-pupils	E3	-11	.E-pupils Tweede Divisie	E-pupils Cup	—
F-pupils	F1	-9	F-pupils Eredivisie	F-pupils Cup	—
F-pupils	F2	-9	.F-pupils Eerste Divisie	F-pupils Cup	—
F-pupils	F3	-9	.F-pupils Tweede Divisie	F-pupils Cup	—

== Education ==
In addition to training professional football players, the Sparta Youth Academy also offer other courses, such as a degree in Sports Marketing, in collaboration with the Erasmus University Rotterdam offered since 2011. A level 3 and level 4 International Business Study program in Sport & Exercise has been offered since 2009 in collaboration with Zadkine College. It is specifically for the players who start in the MBO (department sport and physical activity) and the players that follow a different vocational training in collaboration with a Zadkine customization.

== Board and staff ==
=== Current staff ===
Chairman

- (Netherlands) Rob Westerhof

Head coach

- (Netherlands) Dolf Roks

Technical Director (upper-level A–C)

- (Netherlands) Pieter Schrassert Bert

Technical Director (mid-level A–C)

- (Netherlands) Camiel van Hoogstraten

Technical Director (lower-level D–F)

- (Netherlands) Jim Camphens

== See also ==
- Ajax Youth Academy
- Feyenoord Academy (Varkenoord)
