= Aaron Steele =

Aaron Steele may refer to:

- Aaron Steele (footballer, born 1983), English football player active in Canada
- Aaron Steele (footballer, born 1987), English football player for Brentford and Slough Town
- Aaron Steele (Guitar Hero), a fictional character in the Guitar Hero video game
