= Ryan Watts =

Ryan Watts may refer to:

- Ryan Watts (American football) (born 2001), American football player
- Ryan Watts (footballer) (born 1988), English footballer

== See also ==
- Ryan Watts, American businessman and politician
