= 2009–10 Brentford F.C. season =

English football team season

Brentford
2009–10 season
- Chairman: Greg Dyke
- Manager: Andy Scott
- Stadium: Griffin Park
- League One: 9th
- FA Cup: Third round
- League Cup: First round
- Football League Trophy: First round
- Top goalscorer: League: MacDonald (15); All: MacDonald (17)
- Highest home attendance: 9,031
- Lowest home attendance: 1,960
- Average home league attendance: 6,018
Home colours	Away colours	Third colours

During the 2009–10 English football season, Brentford competed in Football League One. In the Bees' first League One season since 2006–07, the club finished in 9th place and reached the third round of the FA Cup.

== Season summary ==
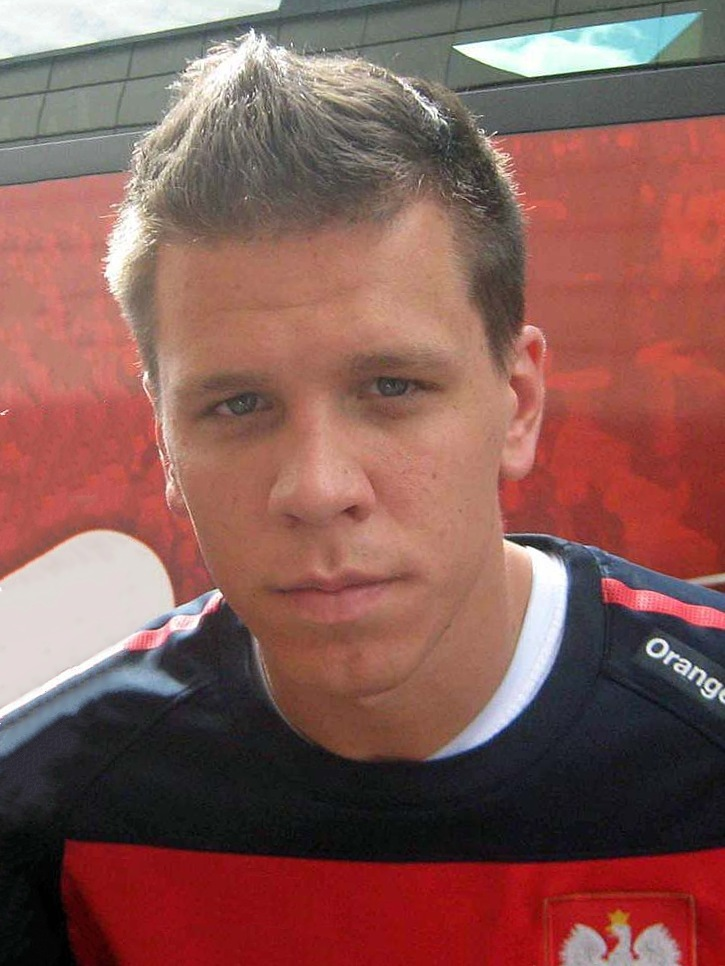
Arsenal's teenage loan goalkeeper Wojciech Szczęsny won praise for his performances during the season.

After promotion back to League One as League Two champions at the end of the 2008–09 season, Brentford manager Andy Scott immediately cleared all the bit-part and injury-prone players out of his squad, releasing 13. In came goalkeepers Lewis Price on a season-long loan and Nikki Bull on a one-year contract, three defenders (Alan Bennett, Danny Foster and Leon Legge), midfielder Sam Saunders, left winger Myles Weston and three forwards (Carl Cort, Steve Kabba and Ben Strevens). Popular forward Nathan Elder departed Griffin Park in early August 2009 and dropped back down to League Two to sign for Shrewsbury Town for an undisclosed fee. Scott would sign three more players between the beginning of the season and the end of the summer transfer window – teenager Simon Moore as third-choice goalkeeper, centre back James Wilson on a one-month loan and winger Cleveland Taylor for an undisclosed fee from Carlisle United.

Manager Andy Scott revealed that Brentford's target for the season was "to get to 52 points" and "to do the double over as many teams as possible and make sure no-one does the double over us". Despite being knocked out of the League Cup in the first round, Brentford started the league season strongly, going third after an opening-day victory over Carlisle United and then going undefeated in the following four matches to consolidate a position in the playoff zone. A 2–1 victory over promotion hopefuls Norwich City at Griffin Park on 18 August was a notable early-season highlight. As injuries mounted and some players found it difficult to replicate their League Two form in League One, manager Scott would search for a winning formula by signing 9 players on loan between November 2009 and March 2010, the most notable of whom being Arsenal goalkeeper Wojciech Szczęsny, centre back Pim Balkestein and central midfielder Toumani Diagouraga, the latter two of whom would sign permanently for the club after the season. Out of form attackers Steve Kabba and Cleveland Taylor were sent out on loan to League Two club Burton Albion, while captain Alan Bennett, who had been out of favour for most of the season, ended the campaign with two spells on loan with Wycombe Wanderers.

Aside from dropping to a season-low placing of 18th in late November and early December, Brentford trod water in mid-table for much of the season and a run of just one defeat in the final 13 matches of the season elevated the club to a credible 9th-place finish. The Bees reached the third round of the FA Cup, seeing off Conference Premier strugglers Gateshead in a replay and League One Walsall in the first two rounds, before falling to 1–0 to Championship club Doncaster Rovers in the third round at Griffin Park. There was some cheer late in the season, when supporter Matthew Benham agreed to invest £1m a year into the club, until the end of the 2013–14 season, in return for preference shares and without increasing the club's debt.

== League table ==
Pos	Team	Pld	W	D	L	GF	GA	GD	Pts
7	Southampton	46	23	14	9	85	47	+38	73 (Note: Southampton were given a ten-point deduction for breaching insolvency regulations, regarding their holding company. As they finished in the bottom three last season, the points deduction were applied in the 2009–10 season.)
8	Colchester United	46	20	12	14	64	52	+12	72
9	Brentford	46	14	20	12	55	52	+3	62
10	Walsall	46	16	14	16	60	63	−3	62
11	Bristol Rovers	46	19	5	22	59	70	−11	62

Source: The Football League
Rules for classification: 1) points; 2) goal difference; 3) number of goals scored.

== Results ==
=== Pre-season ===
8 July 2009	Farnborough	2–1	Brentford	Cherrywood Road
	Ibe	Report	Pitt

11 July 2009	Staines Town	1–0	Brentford	Wheatsheaf Park
15:00	Cumberbatch	Report

15 July 2009	Brentford	1–3	Ipswich Town	Griffin Park
19:45	Strevens	Report	Martin; Wickham; Rhodes

18 July 2009	Aldershot Town	0–0	Brentford	Recreation Ground
15:00		Report		Attendance: 859

21 July 2009	Brentford	2–2	Crystal Palace	Griffin Park
19:45	Weston; Derry (o.g.)	Report	Fonte

22 July 2009 Presidents' Cup	Sutton United	1–3	Brentford	Gander Green Lane
19:45	El-Salahi	Report	Ademola; Elder; Legge	Attendance: 417

25 July 2009	Croydon Athletic	0–1	Brentford	Keith Tuckey Stadium
15:00		Report	Ademola

1 August 2009	Hayes & Yeading United	0–3	Brentford	Beaconsfield Road
15:00		Report	Weston; Lucas

=== Football League One ===
==== Results by round ====
Round	1	2	3	4	5	6	7	8	9	10	11	12	13	14	15	16	17	18	19	20	21	22	23	24	25	26	27	28	29	30	31	32	33	34	35	36	37	38	39	40	41	42	43	44	45	46
Ground	A	H	H	A	H	A	A	H	A	H	H	A	A	H	A	H	H	A	H	A	H	A	A	H	H	A	H	H	H	A	A	H	A	A	A	H	A	A	H	H	A	A	H	H	A	H
Result	W	D	W	D	D	L	D	L	L	W	L	D	L	W	L	D	D	L	W	L	D	W	W	D	W	L	D	W	D	L	D	D	L	W	D	W	W	D	D	W	D	D	W	D	L	D
Position	3	5	5	5	6	8	9	11	15	10	14	12	17	15	16	16	16	18	16	18	17	14	11	11	10	10	10	10	10	11	14	15	16	15	13	12	11	11	11	11	11	11	10	10	10	9

A = Away; H = Home; W = Win; D = Draw; L = Loss

==== League position graph ====
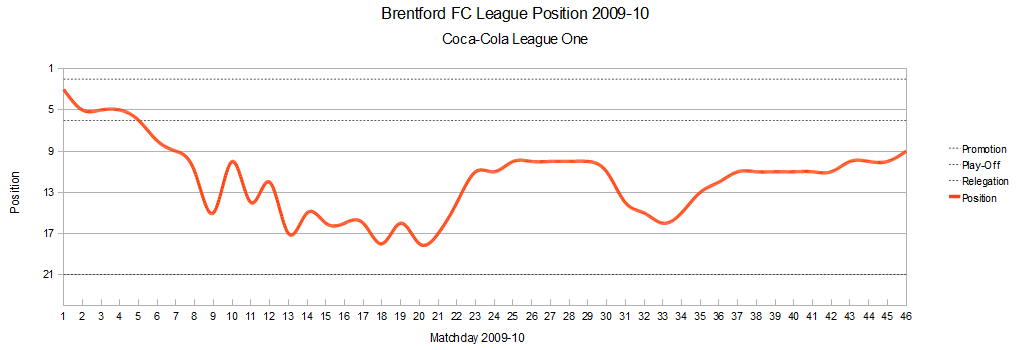

==== Matches ====
8 August 2009 1	Carlisle United	1–3	Brentford	Brunton Park
15:00	Harte 17' (pen.)	Report	Weston 12', 47'; Wood 64'	Attendance: 6,367; Referee: Mark Haywood

15 August 2009 2	Brentford	0–0	Brighton & Hove Albion	Griffin Park
15:00		Report		Attendance: 6,950; Referee: Trevor Kettle

18 August 2009 3	Brentford	2–1	Norwich City	Griffin Park
19:45	Dickson 51'; Hunt 71'	Report	Tudur Jones 90'	Attendance: 7,395; Referee: Graham Scott

22 August 2009 4	Southampton	1–1	Brentford	St Mary's Stadium
15:00	Harding 73'	Report	Taylor 83'	Attendance: 19,169; Referee: David Phillips

28 August 2009 5	Brentford	1–1	Oldham Athletic	Griffin Park
15:00	O'Connor 43' (pen.)	Report	Blackman 52'	Attendance: 5,125; Referee: Grant Hegley

5 September 2009 6	Charlton Athletic	2–0	Brentford	The Valley
12:15	Burton 11'; Sam 30'	Report		Attendance: 16,399; Referee: James Linington

12 September 2009 7	Huddersfield Town	0–0	Brentford	Kirklees Stadium
15:00		report		Attendance: 12,020; Referee: David Webb

19 September 2009 8	Brentford	1–3	Bristol Rovers	Griffin Park
15:00	MacDonald 58'	Report	Dickson 11', 27'; Lescott 41'	Attendance: 6,528; Referee: Simon Hooper

26 September 2009 9	Yeovil Town	2–0	Brentford	Huish Park
15:00	Alcock 25'; Welsh 51'	Report		Attendance: 4,249; Referee: Roger East

29 September 2009 10	Brentford	2–1	Southend United	Griffin Park
19:45	O'Connor 69' (pen.), 90' (pen.)	Report	Francis 9'	Attendance: 5,578; Referee: Pat Miller

3 October 2009 11	Brentford	2–3	Swindon Town	Griffin Park
15:00	Cort 77'; MacDonald 82'	Report	Revell 8', 79'; Hutchinson 21'	Attendance: 6,471; Referee: Oliver Langford

9 October 2009 12	Hartlepool United	0–0	Brentford	Victoria Park
19:45		Report		Attendance: 3,105; Referee: Graham Salisbury

17 October 2009 13	Leyton Orient	2–1	Brentford	Brisbane Road
15:00	McGleish 36'; Foster 65' (o.g.)	Report	Cort 4'	Attendance: 4,781; Referee: Andy D'Urso

24 October 2009 14	Brentford	2–0	Stockport County	Griffin Park
15:00	MacDonald 45'; Weston 70'	Report		Attendance: 5,045; Referee: Gavin Ward

31 October 2009 15	Exeter City	3–0	Brentford	St James Park
15:00	Cozic 7'; Tully 45'; Noone 69'	Report		Attendance: 5,355; Referee: Dean Whitestone

14 November 2009 16	Brentford	2–2	Millwall	Griffin Park
15:00	Bostock 9', 25'	Report	Robinson 15'; Henry 89'	Attendance: 6,408; Referee: Andy Woolmer

21 November 2009 17	Brentford	1–1	Walsall	Griffin Park
15:00	Strevens 11'	Report	Jones 68'	Attendance: 4,492; Referee: Gary Sutton

24 November 2009 18	Wycombe Wanderers	1–0	Brentford	Adams Park
19:45	Harrold 48' (pen.)	Report		Attendance: 5,181; Referee: Keith Stroud

1 December 2009 19	Brentford	1–0	Colchester United	Griffin Park
19:45	MacDonald 15'	Report		Attendance: 4,200; Referee: Graham Scott

5 December 2009 20	Tranmere Rovers	1–0	Brentford	Prenton Park
15:00	Curran 60'	report		Attendance: 4,839; Referee: Chris Sarginson

12 December 2009 21	Brentford	0–0	Leeds United	Griffin Park
15:00		Report		Attendance: 9,031; Referee: Darren Deadman

19 December 2009 22	Milton Keynes Dons	0–1	Brentford	Stadium:mk
15:00		Report	MacDonald 87'	Attendance: 9,520; Referee: Andy Penn

26 December 2009 23	Gillingham	0–1	Brentford	Priestfield Stadium
12:30		Report	Strevens 42'	Attendance: 7,019; Referee: Fred Graham

28 December 2009 24	Brentford	1–1	Charlton Athletic	Griffin Park
15:00	Cort 49'	Report	Bailey 58' (pen.)	Attendance: 8,387; Referee: Andy D'Urso

16 January 2010 25	Brentford	3–1	Carlisle United	Griffin Park
15:00	Weston 31', 55'; Dickson 90'	Report	Harte 81' (pen.)	Attendance: 5,089; Referee: Roger East

23 January 2010 26	Norwich City	1–0	Brentford	Carrow Road
15:00	Martin 77'	Report		Attendance: 24,979; Referee: Steven Rushton

26 January 2010 27	Brentford	1–1	Southampton	Griffin Park
19:45	Legge 83'	Report	James 4'	Attendance: 6,501; Referee: Chris Sarginson

6 February 2010 28	Brentford	4–0	Gillingham	Griffin Park
15:00	MacDonald 10' (pen.), 33' (pen.); Weston 35', 79'	Report		Attendance: 6,036; Referee: Pat Miller

13 February 2010 29	Brentford	1–1	Wycombe Wanderers	Griffin Park
15:00	Weston 75'	Report	Betsy 27'	Attendance: 5,740; Referee: Carl Boyeson

20 February 2010 30	Walsall	2–1	Brentford	Bescot Stadium
15:00	Nicholls 35'; Deeney 84'	Report	MacDonald 17'	Attendance: 3,616; Referee: Jonathan Moss

6 March 2010 31	Leeds United	1–1	Brentford	Elland Road
15:00	Beckford 72'	Report	Strevens 60'	Attendance: 25,445; Referee: Oliver Langford

13 March 2010 32	Brentford	3–3	Milton Keynes Dons	Griffin Park
15:00	Wood 27'; Strevens 70'; Cort 90'	Report	Wilbraham 11', 90'; Easter 55' (pen.)	Attendance: 5,209; Referee: Mike Russell

16 March 2010 33	Brighton & Hove Albion	3–0	Brentford	Withdean Stadium
19:45	Murray 33'; Forster 90' (pen.); Virgo 90'	Report		Attendance: 5,539; Referee: Danny McDermid

20 March 2010 34	Stockport County	0–1	Brentford	Edgeley Park
15:00		Report	MacDonald 46'	Attendance: 3,707; Referee: Nigel Miller

23 March 2010 35	Colchester United	3–3	Brentford	Colchester Community Stadium
19:45	Hunt 32' (o.g.); Wordsworth 45'; Prutton 76'	Report	Hunt 13'; Legge 17'; MacDonald 57'	Attendance: 3,915; Referee: Fred Graham

27 March 2010 36	Brentford	1–0	Leyton Orient	Griffin Park
15:00	Grabban 43'	Report		Attendance: 6,369; Referee: Keith Stroud

30 March 2010 37	Oldham Athletic	2–3	Brentford	Boundary Park
19:45	Abbott 22'; Abbott 82'	Report	MacDonald 30', 69'; Balkestein 64'	Attendance: 2,833; Referee: Anthony Bates

2 April 2010 38	Millwall	1–1	Brentford	The Den
19:45	Robinson 75'	Report	Cort 32'	Attendance: 14,025; Referee: Paul Taylor

5 April 2010 39	Brentford	0–0	Exeter City	Griffin Park
15:00		Report		Attendance: 6,017; Referee: Mike Russell

10 April 2010 40	Brentford	3–0	Huddersfield Town	Griffin Park
15:00	MacDonald 71' (pen.), 84'; Grabban 82'	Report		Attendance: 5,209; Referee: Andy Hall

13 April 2010 41	Southend United	2–2	Brentford	Roots Hall
19:45	Laurent 56', 63'	Report	MacDonald 21'; Cort 62'	Attendance: 6,838; Referee: Trevor Kettle

17 April 2010 42	Bristol Rovers	0–0	Brentford	Memorial Stadium
15:00		Report		Attendance: 6,048; Referee: Paul Tierney

20 April 2010 43	Brentford	2–1	Tranmere Rovers	Griffin Park
19:45	O'Connor 49'; Strevens 86'	Report	Labadie 62'	Attendance: 4,341; Referee: David Phillips

24 April 2010 44	Brentford	1–1	Yeovil Town	Griffin Park
15:00	Saunders 76'	Report	Tomlin 3' (pen.)	Attendance: 5,395; Referee: Graham Horwood

1 May 2010 45	Swindon Town	3–2	Brentford	The County Ground
15:00	Paynter 8', 58'; Ward 45'	Report	Hunt 33'; Strevens 60'	Attendance: 10,465; Referee: Andy Woolmer

8 May 2010 46	Brentford	0–0	Hartlepool United	Griffin Park
15:00		Report		Attendance: 6,893; Referee: Danny McDermid

=== FA Cup ===
7 November 2009 1st Round	Gateshead	2–2	Brentford	Gateshead International Stadium
15:00	Price 57' (o.g.); Winn 90'	Report	Cort 61'; O'Connor 70'	Attendance: 1,150; Referee: Jock Waugh

17 November 2009 1st Round Replay	Brentford	5–2	Gateshead	Griffin Park
19:45	Strevens 42'; MacDonald 45', 60'; Weston 67', 73'	Report	Armstrong 58', 81'	Attendance: 1,960; Referee: James Linington

28 November 2009 2nd Round	Brentford	1–0	Walsall	Griffin Park
15:00	Legge 13'	Report		Attendance: 2,611; Referee: Russell Booth

19 January 2010 3rd Round	Brentford	0–1	Doncaster Rovers	Griffin Park
19:45		Report	O'Connor 87'	Attendance: 2,883; Referee: Grant Hegley

=== Football League Cup ===
11 August 2009 1st Round	Brentford	0–1	Bristol City	Griffin Park
19:45		Report	Maynard 58'	Attendance: 3,024; Referee: Phil Crossley

=== Football League Trophy ===
1 September 2009 1st Round	Norwich City	1–0	Brentford	Carrow Road
19:45	Martin 30'	Report		Attendance: 12,540; Referee: Gavin Ward

- Source: brentfordfc.co.uk

== Playing squad ==
Players' ages are as of the opening day of the 2009–10 season.

No	Position	Name	Nationality	Date of birth (age)	Signed from	Signed in	Notes
Goalkeepers
1	GK	Lewis Price	(Wales)	19 July 1984 (aged 25)	Derby County	2009	On loan from Derby County
21	GK	Nikki Bull	(England)	2 October 1981 (aged 27)	Aldershot Town	2009	
31	GK	Simon Moore	(England)	19 May 1990 (aged 19)	Farnborough	2009	
53	GK	Wojciech Szczęsny	(Poland)	18 April 1990 (aged 19)	Arsenal	2009	On loan from Arsenal
Defenders
3	DF	Ryan Dickson	(England)	14 December 1986 (aged 22)	Plymouth Argyle	2007	
5	DF	Mark Phillips	(England)	27 January 1982 (aged 27)	Millwall	2008	
6	DF	Alan Bennett (c)	(Republic of Ireland)	4 October 1981 (aged 27)	Reading	2009	Loaned to Wycombe Wanderers
14	DF	Danny Foster	(England)	23 September 1984 (aged 24)	Dagenham & Redbridge	2009	
22	DF	Karleigh Osborne	(England)	19 March 1988 (aged 21)	Youth	2004	
24	DF	Lewis Ferrell	(England)	8 March 1991 (aged 18)	Youth	2009	
25	DF	Fraser Franks	(England)	22 November 1990 (aged 18)	Youth	2008	Loaned to Basingstoke Town
27	DF	Ryan Blake	(Northern Ireland)	8 December 1991 (aged 17)	Youth	2009	
29	DF	Pim Balkestein	(Netherlands)	29 April 1987 (aged 22)	Ipswich Town	2009	On loan from Ipswich Town
32	DF	Leon Legge	(England)	1 July 1985 (aged 24)	Tonbridge Angels	2009	
Midfielders
2	MF	Kevin O'Connor	(Republic of Ireland)	24 February 1982 (aged 27)	Youth	2000	
4	MF	Marcus Bean	(Jamaica)	2 November 1984 (aged 24)	Blackpool	2008	
7	MF	Sam Saunders	(England)	29 August 1983 (aged 25)	Dagenham & Redbridge	2009	
11	MF	Myles Weston	(Antigua and Barbuda)	12 March 1988 (aged 21)	Notts County	2009	
12	MF	Cleveland Taylor	(Jamaica)	9 September 1983 (aged 25)	Carlisle United	2009	Loaned to Burton Albion
13	MF	David Hunt	(England)	10 September 1982 (aged 26)	Shrewsbury Town	2009	
16	MF	Sam Wood	(England)	9 August 1986 (aged 22)	Bromley	2008	
20	MF	Toumani Diagouraga	(France)	20 June 1987 (aged 22)	Peterborough United	2010	On loan from Peterborough United
28	MF	James McCluskey	(England)	10 November 1991 (aged 17)	Youth	2009	
Forwards
8	FW	Steve Kabba	(England)	7 March 1981 (aged 28)	Watford	2009	Loaned to Burton Albion
9	FW	Carl Cort	(Guyana)	1 November 1977 (aged 31)	Norwich City	2009	
10	FW	Charlie MacDonald	(England)	13 February 1981 (aged 28)	Southend United	2008	
18	FW	Ben Strevens	(England)	24 May 1980 (aged 29)	Dagenham & Redbridge	2009	
Players who left the club mid-season
17	MF	Lionel Ainsworth	(England)	1 October 1987 (aged 21)	Huddersfield Town	2010	Returned to Huddersfield Town after loan
~~17~~	MF	John Bostock	(England)	15 January 1992 (aged 17)	Tottenham Hotspur	2009	Returned to Tottenham Hotspur after loan
~~19~~	FW	Moses Ademola	(England)	18 July 1989 (aged 20)	Croydon Athletic	2008	Loaned to Woking, transferred to Woking
19	FW	John Akinde	(England)	8 July 1989 (aged 20)	Bristol City	2010	Returned to Bristol City after loan
23	FW	Lewis Grabban	(England)	12 January 1988 (aged 21)	Millwall	2010	Returned to Millwall after loan
~~23~~	DF	Tommy Smith	(New Zealand)	31 March 1990 (aged 19)	Ipswich Town	2010	Returned to Ipswich Town after loan
~~23~~	DF	James Wilson	(Wales)	26 February 1989 (aged 20)	Bristol City	2009	Returned to Bristol City after loan
26	MF	Marvin Williams	(England)	12 August 1987 (aged 21)	Yeovil Town	2008	Released
37	FW	Rhys Murphy	(Republic of Ireland)	6 November 1990 (aged 18)	Arsenal	2009	Returned to Arsenal after loan

- Source: Soccerbase

== Coaching staff ==
Name	Role
(England) Andy Scott	Manager
(England) Terry Bullivant	Assistant manager
(England) Steve Smith	Goalkeeping coach
(England) Andy Harris	Chief scout
(England) Dave Appanah	Physiotherapist
(England) Alasdair Lane	Fitness Coach
(England) Mick Quinn	Sports Therapist
(England) Dave Carter	Kit Man

== Statistics ==
=== Appearances and goals ===
Substitute appearances in brackets.

No	Pos	Nat	Name	League		FA Cup		League Cup		FL Trophy		Total	
No	Pos	Nat	Name	Apps	Goals	Apps	Goals	Apps	Goals	Apps	Goals	Apps	Goals
2	MF	(Republic of Ireland)	Kevin O'Connor	43	4	4	1	1	0	1	0	49	5
3	DF	(England)	Ryan Dickson	26 (1)	2	4	0	1	0	0	0	31 (1)	2
4	MF	(Jamaica)	Marcus Bean	25 (6)	0	4	0	0	0	1	0	30 (6)	0
5	DF	(England)	Mark Phillips	19 (3)	0	0	0	1	0	0	0	20 (3)	0
6	DF	(Republic of Ireland)	Alan Bennett	11 (2)	0	3	0	1	0	0	0	15 (2)	0
7	MF	(England)	Sam Saunders	15 (11)	1	1 (1)	0	1	0	1	0	18 (12)	1
8	FW	(England)	Steve Kabba	3 (7)	0	0	0	1	0	1	0	5 (7)	0
9	FW	(Guyana)	Carl Cort	16 (12)	6	1 (1)	1	0	0	0	0	17 (13)	7
10	FW	(England)	Charlie MacDonald	39 (1)	15	3	2	0	0	0	0	42 (1)	17
11	MF	(Antigua and Barbuda)	Myles Weston	32 (8)	8	3	2	1	0	1	0	37 (8)	10
12	MF	(Jamaica)	Cleveland Taylor	8 (4)	1	1 (1)	0	0	0	1	0	10 (5)	1
13	MF	(England)	David Hunt	18 (6)	3	0 (4)	0	1	0	1	0	20 (10)	3
14	DF	(England)	Danny Foster	32 (4)	0	4	0	1	0	1	0	38 (4)	0
16	MF	(England)	Sam Wood	37 (6)	2	3	0	1	0	0 (1)	0	41 (7)	2
18	FW	(England)	Ben Strevens	20 (5)	6	3 (1)	1	0	0	0	0	23 (6)	7
21	GK	(England)	Nikki Bull	5 (1)	0	0	0	1	0	0	0	6 (1)	0
22	DF	(England)	Karleigh Osborne	13 (6)	0	1	0	0 (1)	0	1	0	15 (7)	0
26	MF	(England)	Marvin Williams	0	0	—		0 (1)	0	—		0 (1)	0
27	DF	(Northern Ireland)	Ryan Blake	0 (1)	0	0	0	0	0	0	0	0 (1)	0
31	GK	(England)	Simon Moore	0 (1)	0	0	0	0	0	0	0	0 (1)	0
32	DF	(England)	Leon Legge	28 (1)	2	3	1	0	0	1	0	32 (1)	3
Players loaned in during the season
1	GK	(Wales)	Lewis Price	13	0	4	0	0	0	1	0	18	0
17	MF	(England)	Lionel Ainsworth	1 (8)	0	—		—		—		1 (8)	0
~~17~~	MF	(England)	John Bostock	9	2	1	0	—		—		10	2
19	FW	(England)	John Akinde	2	0	—		—		—		2	0
20	MF	(France)	Toumani Diagouraga	20	0	—		—		—		20	0
23	FW	(England)	Lewis Grabban	7	2	—		—		—		7	2
~~23~~	DF	(New Zealand)	Tommy Smith	8	0	—		—		—		0	0
~~23~~	DF	(Wales)	James Wilson	13	0	1	0	—		0	0	14	0
29	DF	(Netherlands)	Pim Balkestein	14	1	0	0	—		—		14	1
37	FW	(Republic of Ireland)	Rhys Murphy	1 (4)	0	0 (1)	0	—		—		1 (5)	0
53	GK	(Poland)	Wojciech Szczęsny	28	0	—		—		—		28	0

- Players listed in italics left the club mid-season.
- Source: Soccerbase

=== Goalscorers ===
No	Pos	Nat	Player	FL1	FAC	FLC	FLT	Total
10	FW	(England)	Charlie MacDonald	15	2	0	0	17
11	MF	(Antigua and Barbuda)	Myles Weston	8	2	0	0	10
9	FW	(Guyana)	Carl Cort	6	1	0	0	7
18	FW	(England)	Ben Strevens	6	1	0	0	7
2	MF	(Republic of Ireland)	Kevin O'Connor	4	1	0	0	5
13	MF	(England)	David Hunt	3	0	0	0	3
32	DF	(England)	Leon Legge	2	1	0	0	3
23	FW	(England)	Lewis Grabban	2	—	—	—	2
~~17~~	MF	(England)	John Bostock	2	0	—	—	2
3	DF	(England)	Ryan Dickson	2	0	0	0	2
16	MF	(England)	Sam Wood	2	0	0	0	2
29	DF	(Netherlands)	Pim Balkestein	1	0	—	—	1
7	MF	(England)	Sam Saunders	1	0	0	0	1
12	MF	(Jamaica)	Cleveland Taylor	1	0	0	0	1
Total				55	8	0	0	63

- Players listed in italics left the club mid-season.
- Source: Soccerbase

=== Discipline ===
No	Pos	Nat	Player	FL1		FAC		FLC		FLT		Total		Pts
No	Pos	Nat	Player	Booked	Sent off (straight red)	Booked	Sent off (straight red)	Booked	Sent off (straight red)	Booked	Sent off (straight red)	Booked	Sent off (straight red)	Pts
4	MF	(Jamaica)	Marcus Bean	7	0	1	0	0	0	1	0	9	0	9
2	MF	(Republic of Ireland)	Kevin O'Connor	5	0	0	0	0	0	0	0	5	0	5
32	DF	(England)	Leon Legge	5	0	0	0	0	0	0	0	5	0	5
14	DF	(England)	Danny Foster	4	0	0	0	0	0	0	0	4	0	4
5	DF	(England)	Mark Phillips	4	0	0	0	0	0	0	0	4	0	4
3	DF	(England)	Ryan Dickson	3	0	1	0	0	0	0	0	4	0	4
10	FW	(England)	Charlie MacDonald	1	1	0	0	0	0	0	0	1	1	4
6	DF	(Republic of Ireland)	Alan Bennett	1	1	0	0	0	0	0	0	1	1	4
53	GK	(Poland)	Wojciech Szczęsny	3	0	—		—		—		3	0	3
13	MF	(England)	David Hunt	3	0	0	0	0	0	0	0	3	0	3
22	DF	(England)	Karleigh Osborne	3	0	0	0	0	0	0	0	3	0	3
18	FW	(England)	Ben Strevens	3	0	0	0	0	0	0	0	3	0	3
11	MF	(Antigua and Barbuda)	Myles Weston	3	0	0	0	0	0	0	0	3	0	3
~~23~~	DF	(Wales)	James Wilson	0	1	0	0	—		0	0	0	1	3
20	MF	(France)	Toumani Diagouraga	1	0	—		—		—		1	0	1
~~23~~	DF	(New Zealand)	Tommy Smith	1	0	—		—		—		1	0	1
29	DF	(Netherlands)	Pim Balkestein	1	0	0	0	—		—		1	0	1
~~17~~	MF	(England)	John Bostock	1	0	0	0	—		—		1	0	1
1	GK	(Wales)	Lewis Price	1	0	0	0	0	0	0	0	1	0	1
7	MF	(England)	Sam Saunders	1	0	0	0	0	0	0	0	1	0	1
12	MF	(Jamaica)	Cleveland Taylor	1	0	0	0	0	0	0	0	1	0	1
16	MF	(England)	Sam Wood	1	0	0	0	0	0	0	0	1	0	1
Total				53	3	2	0	0	0	1	0	56	3	75

- Players listed in italics left the club mid-season.
- Source: ESPN FC

=== Management ===
Name	Nat	From	To	Record All Comps					Record League				
Name	Nat	From	To	P	W	D	L	W %	P	W	D	L	W %
Andy Scott	(England)	8 August 2009	8 May 2010	52	16	21	15	30.77|	46	14	20	12	30.43

=== Summary ===
Games played	52 (46 League One, 4 FA Cup, 1 League Cup, 1 Football League Trophy)
Games won	16 (14 League One, 2 FA Cup, 0 League Cup, 0 Football League Trophy)
Games drawn	21 (20 League One, 1 FA Cup, 0 League Cup, 0 Football League Trophy)
Games lost	15 (12 League One, 1 FA Cup, 1 League Cup, 1 Football League Trophy)
Goals scored	51 (55 League One, 8 FA Cup, 0 League Cup, 0 Football League Trophy)
Goals conceded	51 (52 League One, 5 FA Cup, 1 League Cup, 1 Football League Trophy)
Clean sheets	16 (15 League One, 1 FA Cup, 0 League Cup, 0 Football League Trophy)
Biggest league win	4–0 versus Gillingham, 6 February 2010
Worst league defeat	3–0 on two occasions
Most appearances	49, Kevin O'Connor (43 League One, 4 FA Cup, 1 League Cup, 1 Football League Trophy)
Top scorer (league)	15, Charlie MacDonald
Top scorer (all competitions)	17, Charlie MacDonald

== Transfers & loans ==
Players transferred in
Date	Pos.	Name	Previous club	Fee	Ref.
1 July 2009	DF	(England) Danny Foster	(England) Dagenham & Redbridge	Free	
1 July 2009	DF	(England) Leon Legge	(England) Tonbridge Angels	n/a	
1 July 2009	MF	(England) Sam Saunders	(England) Dagenham & Redbridge	Free	
1 July 2009	FW	(England) Ben Strevens	(England) Dagenham & Redbridge	Free	
2 July 2009	MF	(Antigua and Barbuda) Myles Weston	(England) Notts County	£75,000	
30 July 2009	DF	(Republic of Ireland) Alan Bennett	(England) Reading	Free	
3 August 2009	GK	(England) Nikki Bull	(England) Aldershot Town	Free	
4 August 2009	FW	(Guyana) Carl Cort	(England) Norwich City	Free	
6 August 2009	FW	(England) Steve Kabba	(England) Watford	Free	
10 August 2009	GK	(England) Simon Moore	(England) Farnborough	Free	
13 August 2009	MF	(Jamaica) Cleveland Taylor	(England) Carlisle United	Undisclosed	
Players loaned in
Date from	Pos.	Name	From	Date to	Ref.
8 July 2009	GK	(Wales) Lewis Price	(England) Derby County	End of season	
20 August 2009	DF	(Wales) James Wilson	(England) Bristol City	1 January 2010	
13 November 2009	MF	(England) John Bostock	(England) Tottenham Hotspur	18 January 2010	
20 November 2009	DF	(Netherlands) Pim Balkestein	(England) Ipswich Town	30 December 2009	
20 November 2009	GK	(Poland) Wojciech Szczęsny	(England) Arsenal	End of season	
24 November 2009	FW	(Republic of Ireland) Rhys Murphy	(England) Arsenal	8 January 2010	
8 January 2010	DF	(New Zealand) Tommy Smith	(England) Ipswich Town	15 March 2010	
21 January 2010	MF	(France) Toumani Diagouraga	(England) Peterborough United	End of season	
27 January 2010	MF	(England) Lionel Ainsworth	(England) Huddersfield Town	27 April 2010	
1 February 2010	FW	(England) John Akinde	(England) Bristol City	1 March 2010	
25 March 2010	DF	(Netherlands) Pim Balkestein	(England) Ipswich Town	End of season	
25 March 2010	FW	(England) Lewis Grabban	(England) Millwall	19 April 2010	
Players transferred out
Date	Pos.	Name	Subsequent club	Fee	Ref.
4 August 2009	FW	(England) Nathan Elder	(England) Shrewsbury Town	Undisclosed	
29 January 2010	FW	(England) Moses Ademola	(England) Woking	29 January 2010	
Players loaned out
Date from	Pos.	Name	To	Date to	Ref.
1 August 2009	FW	(England) Moses Ademola	(England) Woking	28 January 2010	
18 September 2009	DF	(England) Fraser Franks	(England) Basingstoke Town	December 2009	
26 November 2009	FW	(England) Steve Kabba	(England) Burton Albion	End of season	
15 January 2010	MF	(Jamaica) Cleveland Taylor	(England) Burton Albion	End of season	
2 February 2010	DF	(England) Chris Bush	(England) Salisbury City	n/a	
16 February 2010	DF	(Republic of Ireland) Alan Bennett	(England) Wycombe Wanderers	16 March 2010	
25 March 2010	DF	(Republic of Ireland) Alan Bennett	(England) Wycombe Wanderers	End of season	
30 March 2010	MF	(Spain) Pelayo Gomez Pico	(England) Carshalton Athletic	End of season	
30 March 2010	MF	(England) James McCluskey	(England) Cheshunt	End of season	
30 March 2010	FW	(England) David Pitt	(England) Worthing	End of season	
30 March 2010	DF	(England) Ricky Valentine	(England) Cheshunt	End of season	
Players released
Date	Pos.	Name	Subsequent club	Join date	Ref.
2 September 2009	MF	(England) Marvin Williams	(England) Torquay United	2 September 2009	
30 June 2010	DF	(England) Lewis Ferrell	(England) Hayes & Yeading United	2010	
30 June 2010	DF	(England) Fraser Franks	(England) AFC Wimbledon	29 July 2010	
30 June 2010	FW	(England) Steve Kabba	(England) Barnet	31 August 2010	
30 June 2010	DF	(England) Mark Phillips	(England) Southend United	2 August 2010	

== Kit ==
Supplier: Puma
Sponsor(s): Hertings (home), MKT Computers (away & third)

Home	Away	Third

Source: Historical Football Kits

Goalkeeper	Goalkeeper	Goalkeeper

Source: Historical Football Kits

== Awards ==
- Supporters' Player of the Year: Leon Legge
- Community Player of the Year: Karleigh Osborne
- FA Cup Player of the Round: Leon Legge (second round)
- Football League Family Excellence Award
