= 2005–06 Brentford F.C. season =

English football team season

Brentford
2005–06 season
- Chairman: Eddie Rogers (until January 2006); Greg Dyke (from January 2006)
- Manager: Martin Allen
- Stadium: Griffin Park
- League One: 3rd
- Play-offs: Semi-finals
- FA Cup: Fifth round
- League Cup: First round
- Football League Trophy: First round
- Top goalscorer: League: Owusu (12); All: Owusu (14)
- Highest home attendance: 9,359
- Lowest home attendance: 5,131
- Average home league attendance: 6,775
Home colours	Away colours

During the 2005–06 English football season, Brentford competed in Football League One. For the second season in succession, the club reached the FA Cup fifth round and the play-off semi-finals.

== Season summary ==
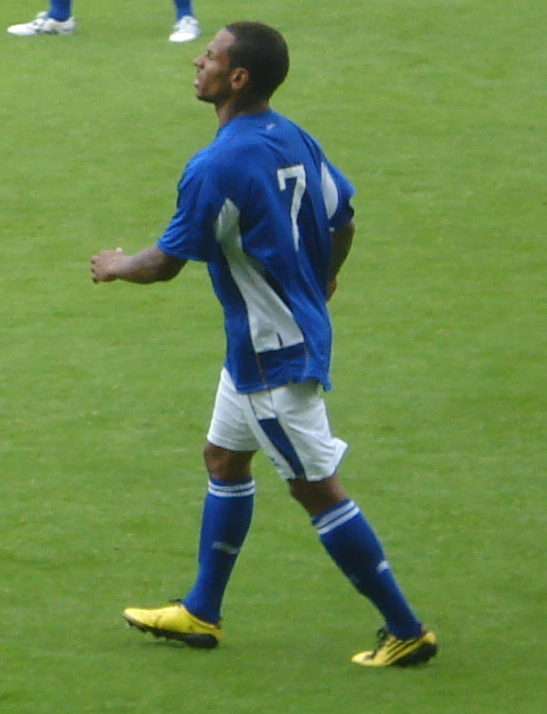
The £500,000 sale of in-form DJ Campbell in January 2006 robbed Brentford of a vital source of goals.

After defeat to Sheffield Wednesday in the 2005 League One play-off semi-finals, Brentford manager Martin Allen strengthened the squad with a number of acquisitions on free transfers. He raided his former club Reading (Ricky Newman, Paul Brooker and former Bees favourite Lloyd Owusu) and acquired youngsters Ólafur Ingi Skúlason, Sam Tillen and non-League forward DJ Campbell. Still heavily in debt to former chairman Ron Noades' company Altonwood, the club had ongoing budgetary concerns, with the departure of London Broncos as tenants of Griffin Park losing the club £100,000. By mid-August 2005, Supporters' Trust Bees United (which had taken operational control of the club in 2003) had raised £700,000 of the £1,000,000 needed to acquire a majority shareholding. Former Director-General of the BBC Greg Dyke, a lifelong supporter, loaned the club money in the autumn.

Brentford began the season as one of the top teams in League One, with five wins from the opening eight league matches putting the club at the top of the table. A 3–2 defeat to Huddersfield Town on 17 September led to a dip in form and a run of two wins in 9 matches in all competitions dropped the Bees dropped to 4th place. After first round exits of the League Cup and Football League Trophy, victory in the FA Cup first round over Rochdale on 5 November began a resurgence in form, with Brentford losing just twice in 20 matches and returning to the top of the table for the first time in over three months after victory over previous leaders Swansea City at Griffin Park on Boxing Day.

Brentford advanced to the fifth round of the FA Cup for the second consecutive season, defeating Oldham Athletic and Stockport County in the second and third rounds before completing a giant-killing of Premier League strugglers Sunderland in the fourth round at Griffin Park. Brentford's form owed much to the goalscoring of Lloyd Owusu and DJ Campbell, with Campbell scoring eight goals in six matches in January 2006, which included both the Bees' goals in the victory over Sunderland. Campbell's performance versus the Black Cats won national attention and three days later, on transfer deadline day, he was sold to Premier League club Birmingham City for a £500,000 fee. Despite the sale of then-top scorer Campbell, January 2006 was a good month for the Bees, with Bees United acquiring the majority shareholding of the club and the appointment of Greg Dyke as non-executive chairman.

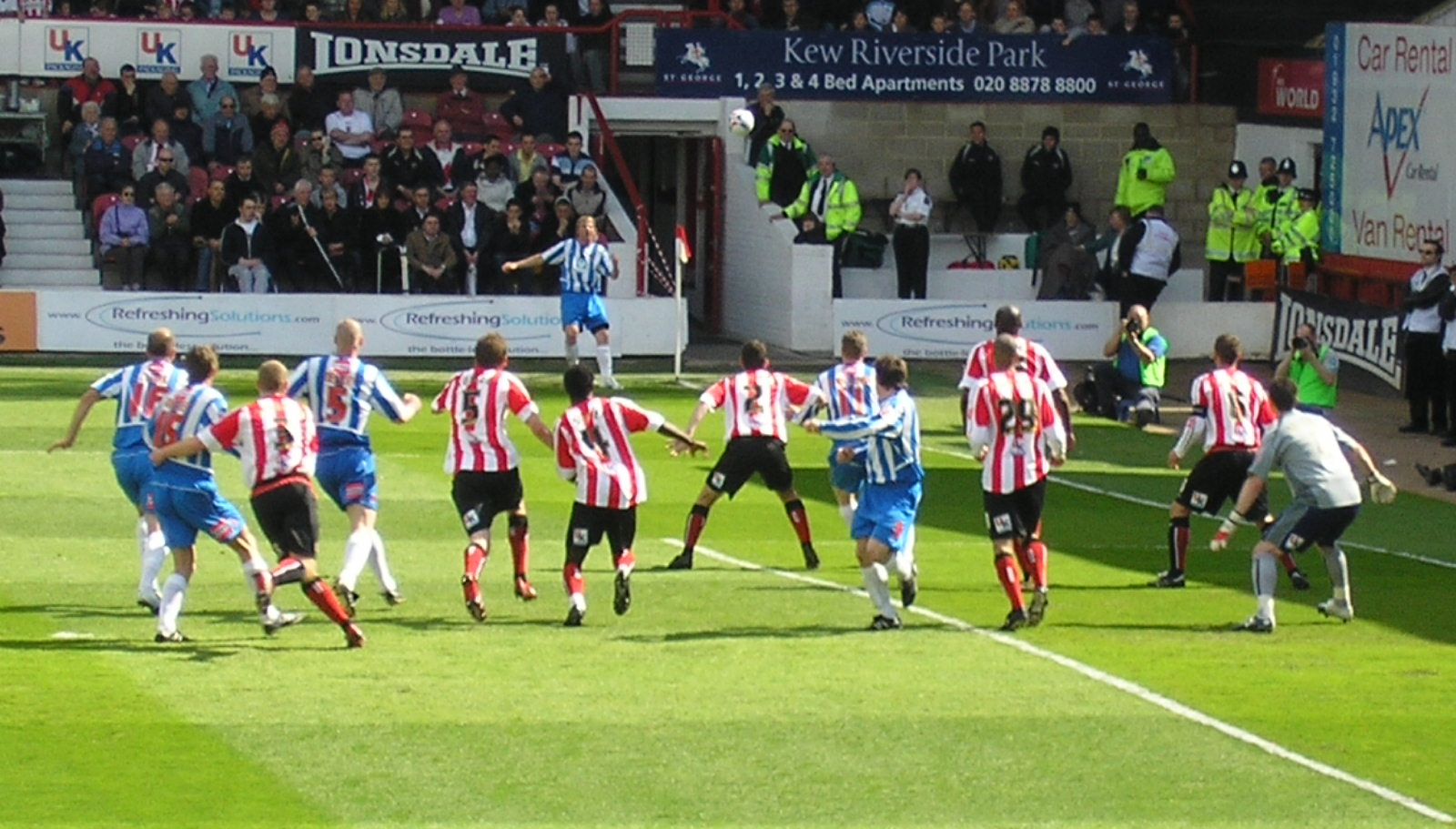
Brentford defending a Hartlepool United corner at Griffin Park in April 2006.

Three consecutive wins at the beginning of February 2006 put the club in 3rd position in advance of the visit to Charlton Athletic for the FA Cup fifth round match. A 3–1 defeat ended a memorable cup run and the Bees' form began to suffer, with four defeats in the next seven league matches, but two consecutive wins in early March elevated the club into 2nd place. DJ Campbell's replacement Calum Willock failed to materialise as a goal threat, a lean spell from Lloyd Owusu and injury to set-piece taker Kevin O'Connor led to the team's goals drying up. Beginning with a win over Milton Keynes Dons on 28 March, Brentford went unbeaten for the rest of the season, but six draws from the final seven matches dropped the club out of the automatic promotion places. The Bees' goalscoring problems were further compounded after Lloyd Owusu suffered a torn groin muscle while on international duty with Ghana on 26 April, which ruled him out for the rest of the season and put him out of contention for a place in Ghana's 2006 World Cup squad.

3rd-place Brentford met 6th-place Swansea City in the League One play-off semi-finals. Despite taking the lead at the Liberty Stadium and largely controlling the first leg, Swans defender Sam Ricketts salvaged a 1–1 draw with a deflected shot in the dying minutes. Two quick-fire goals from Swansea City forward Leon Knight in the first 15 minutes of the second leg at Griffin Park killed the tie and Brentford exited the play-offs 3–1 on aggregate.

== League table ==
Pos	Team	Pld	W	D	L	GF	GA	GD	Pts	Qualification or relegation
1	Southend United (C, P)	46	23	13	10	72	43	+29	82	Promotion to the Championship
2	Colchester United (P)	46	22	13	11	58	40	+18	79	Promotion to the Championship
3	Brentford	46	20	16	10	72	52	+20	76	Qualification for the League One play-offs
4	Huddersfield Town	46	19	16	11	72	59	+13	73	Qualification for the League One play-offs
5	Barnsley (O, P)	46	18	18	10	62	44	+18	72	Qualification for the League One play-offs

Rules for classification: 1) Points; 2) Goal difference; 3) Goals scored
(C) Champions; (O) Play-off winners; (P) Promoted

== Results ==
Brentford's goal tally listed first.

=== Legend ===
Win	Draw	Loss

=== Pre-season ===
Date	Opponent	Venue	Result	Attendance	Scorer(s)
9 July 2005	Staines Town	A	0–0	n/a	
12 July 2005	Bideford AFC	A	2–1	n/a	Skúlason, Brooker
17 July 2005	Dagenham & Redbridge	A	3–1	n/a	Rankin, Brooker, Campbell
20 July 2005	Leyton Orient	H	2–0	1,935	Campbell, Osborne
23 July 2005	Charlton Athletic	H	0–0	n/a	
25 July 2005	Yeading	A	1–3	n/a	Owusu
26 July 2005	Weymouth	A	1–0	780	Peters
30 July 2005	Woking	A	0–1	912	
1 August 2005	Hampton & Richmond Borough	A	0–1	n/a	

=== Football League One ===
No.	Date	Opponent	Venue	Result	Attendance	Scorer(s)
1	6 August 2005	Scunthorpe United	H	2–0	5,952	Tabb, Campbell (pen)
2	10 August 2005	Chesterfield	A	3–1	4,121	Sodje, Rankin (2)
3	15 August 2005	Port Vale	A	0–1	4,275	
4	20 August 2005	Tranmere Rovers	H	2–0	5,438	Tabb, Hutchinson
5	27 August 2005	Barnsley	A	1–1	7,462	Owusu
6	29 August 2005	Gillingham	H	1–1	6,969	Peters
7	3 September 2005	Nottingham Forest	A	2–1	17,234	Frampton, Pratley
8	10 September 2005	Milton Keynes Dons	H	1–0	5,862	O'Connor (pen)
9	17 September 2005	Huddersfield Town	A	2–3	11,622	Rankin, Campbell
10	24 September 2005	Bristol City	H	2–3	6,413	Brooker, Sodje
11	27 September 2005	Walsall	A	0–0	4,873	
12	1 October 2005	Rotherham United	H	2–1	5,901	O'Connor (pen), Rankin
13	9 October 2005	Oldham Athletic	A	1–0	5,089	S.P. Fitzgerald
14	15 October 2005	Swindon Town	H	0–0	6,969	
15	22 October 2005	Blackpool	A	0–0	5,041	
16	29 October 2005	Bournemouth	H	0–2	6,625	
17	12 November 2005	Hartlepool United	A	2–1	4,811	Campbell, Owusu
18	19 November 2005	Oldham Athletic	H	3–3	5,450	Pratley, Campbell, Owusu
19	26 November 2005	Scunthorpe United	A	3–1	4,322	Pratley (2), Booker
20	6 December 2005	Yeovil Town	H	3–2	5,131	Jones (og), Tabb, Turner
21	10 December 2005	Chesterfield	H	1–1	5,828	O'Connor
22	17 December 2005	Tranmere Rovers	A	4–1	6,210	Newman, Tabb, O'Connor (pen), Owusu
23	26 December 2005	Swansea City	H	2–1	9,903	O'Connor, Hutchinson
24	31 December 2005	Colchester United	H	0–2	6,397	
25	2 January 2006	Bradford City	A	3–3	7,588	Campbell (2, 1 pen), Sodje
26	14 January 2006	Southend United	A	1–4	10,046	Campbell
27	17 January 2006	Nottingham Forest	H	1–1	7,859	Campbell
28	21 January 2006	Huddersfield Town	H	2–0	7,636	Owusu, Campbell
29	4 February 2006	Walsall	H	5–0	5,645	Rankin, Newman, Brooker, Sodje, O'Connor (pen)
30	11 February 2006	Bristol City	A	1–0	10,854	Owusu
31	14 February 2006	Southend United	H	2–0	7,022	Jupp (og), Gayle
32	25 February 2006	Port Vale	H	0–1	7,542	
33	28 February 2006	Doncaster Rovers	A	0–0	5,250	
34	7 March 2006	Yeovil Town	A	2–1	5,137	Rankin, Rhodes
35	11 March 2006	Barnsley	H	3–1	7,352	Newman, Owusu (2, 1 pen)
36	17 March 2006	Swansea City	A	1–2	13,508	Frampton
37	21 March 2006	Gillingham	A	2–3	5,745	Turner, Tabb
38	25 March 2006	Doncaster Rovers	H	0–1	7,323	
39	28 March 2006	Milton Keynes Dons	A	1–0	5,592	Owusu
40	1 April 2006	Colchester United	A	1–1	5,635	Tabb
41	8 April 2006	Bradford City	H	1–1	6,533	Owusu
42	15 April 2006	Rotherham United	A	2–2	5,242	Owusu, Rankin
43	17 April 2006	Blackpool	H	1–1	7,339	Owusu (pen)
44	22 April 2006	Swindon Town	A	3–1	6,845	Brooker, Gayle, Willock
45	29 April 2006	Hartlepool United	H	1–1	8,725	O'Connor
46	6 May 2006	Bournemouth	A	2–2	9,359	Sodje, Frampton

=== Football League play-offs ===
Round	Date	Opponent	Venue	Result	Attendance	Scorer(s)
SF (1st leg)	11 May 2006	Swansea City	A	1–1	19,060	Tabb
SF (2nd leg)	14 May 2006	Swansea City	H	0–2 (lost 3–1 on aggregate)	10,652	

=== FA Cup ===
Round	Date	Opponent	Venue	Result	Attendance	Scorer(s)
R1	5 November 2005	Rochdale	A	1–0	2,928	O'Connor (pen)
R2	3 December 2005	Oldham Athletic	A	1–1	4,365	Sodje
R2 (replay)	13 December 2005	Oldham Athletic	H	1–0	3,146	Owusu
R3	7 January 2006	Stockport County	A	3–2	4,078	Owusu, Campbell, Rankin
R4	28 January 2006	Sunderland	H	2–1	11,698	Campbell (2)
R5	18 February 2006	Charlton Athletic	A	1–3	22,098	Rankin

=== Football League Cup ===
Round	Date	Opponent	Venue	Result	Attendance
R1	23 August 2005	Cheltenham Town	A	0–5	2,113

=== Football League Trophy ===
Round	Date	Opponent	Venue	Result	Attendance	Scorer(s)
SR1	18 October 2005	Oxford United	H	1–1 (a.e.t.), lost 4–3 on pens)	1,785	S.P. Fitzgerald

- Sources: Soccerbase, 11v11

== Playing squad ==
Players' ages are as of the opening day of the 2005–06 season.

No	Position	Name	Nationality	Date of birth (age)	Signed from	Signed in	Notes
Goalkeepers
1	GK	Stuart Nelson	(England)	17 September 1981 (aged 23)	Hucknall Town	2004	
21	GK	Clark Masters	(England)	31 May 1987 (aged 18)	Youth	2005	Loaned to Redbridge and Slough Town
31	GK	Ademola Bankole	(Nigeria)	9 September 1969 (aged 35)	Maidenhead United	2005	Goalkeeping coach
Defenders
2	DF	Kevin O'Connor	(Republic of Ireland)	24 February 1982 (aged 23)	Youth	2000	
3	DF	Andy Frampton	(England)	3 September 1979 (aged 25)	Crystal Palace	2002	
4	DF	Sam Sodje	(Nigeria)	14 July 1980 (aged 25)	Margate	2004	
5	DF	Michael Turner	(England)	9 November 1983 (aged 21)	Charlton Athletic	2004	
12	DF	Michael Dobson	(England)	9 April 1981 (aged 24)	Youth	1999	Loaned to Reading
18	DF	Sam Tillen	(England)	16 April 1985 (aged 20)	Chelsea	2005	
23	DF	Jamie Smith	(England)	17 September 1974 (aged 30)	Bristol City	2006	On loan from Bristol City
32	DF	Scott B. Fitzgerald	(Republic of Ireland)	13 August 1969 (aged 35)	Colchester United	2004	Youth team manager
33	DF	Darius Charles	(England)	10 December 1987 (aged 17)	Youth	2004	Loaned to Thurrock and Yeading
36	DF	Karleigh Osborne	(England)	19 March 1988 (aged 17)	Youth	2004	Loaned to Hayes
37	DF	Ryan Watts	(England)	18 May 1988 (aged 17)	Youth	2005	
Midfielders
6	MF	Ricky Newman (c)	(England)	5 August 1970 (aged 35)	Reading	2005	
7	MF	Paul Brooker	(England)	25 November 1976 (aged 28)	Reading	2005	
8	MF	Ólafur Ingi Skúlason	(Iceland)	1 April 1983 (aged 22)	Arsenal	2005	
11	MF	Jay Tabb	(Republic of Ireland)	21 February 1984 (aged 21)	Crystal Palace	2000	
14	MF	Eddie Hutchinson	(England)	23 February 1982 (aged 23)	Sutton United	2000	
17	MF	Alex Rhodes	(England)	23 January 1982 (aged 23)	Newmarket Town	2003	
20	MF	Ryan Peters	(England)	21 August 1987 (aged 17)	Youth	2004	
22	MF	John Mousinho	(England)	30 April 1986 (aged 19)	Unattached	2005	Loaned to Woking, Slough Town and Yeading
24	MF	Junior Lewis	(England)	9 October 1973 (aged 31)	Edgware Town	2005	
29	MF	Darren Pratley	(England)	22 April 1985 (aged 20)	Fulham	2005	On loan from Fulham
Forwards
9	FW	Lloyd Owusu	(Ghana)	12 November 1976 (aged 28)	Reading	2005	
10	FW	Scott P. Fitzgerald	(England)	18 November 1979 (aged 25)	Watford	2005	Loaned to Oxford United and Walsall
15	FW	Isaiah Rankin	(England)	22 May 1978 (aged 27)	Grimsby Town	2004	
16	FW	Marcus Gayle	(Jamaica)	27 September 1970 (aged 34)	Watford	2005	
19	FW	Calum Willock	(Saint Kitts and Nevis)	29 October 1981 (aged 23)	Peterborough United	2006	
39	FW	Charlie Ide	(England)	10 May 1988 (aged 17)	Youth	2005	Loaned to Slough Town
Players who left the club mid-season
~~19~~	FW	DJ Campbell	(England)	12 November 1981 (aged 23)	Yeading	2005	Transferred to Birmingham City
~~22~~	MF	Joe Keenan	(England)	14 October 1982 (aged 22)	Chelsea	2005	Returned to Chelsea after loan expired
35	MF	Aaron Steele	(England)	1 February 1987 (aged 18)	Youth	2004	Loaned to Slough Town, released
40	MF	George Moleski	(England)	27 July 1987 (aged 18)	Youth	2005	Loaned to Slough Town, released

- Source: Soccerbase

== Coaching staff ==
Name	Role
(England) Martin Allen	Manager
(England) Adrian Whitbread	First Team Coach
(Nigeria) Ademola Bankole	Goalkeeping Coach
(England) Damien Doyle	Sports Therapist
(England) John Griffin	Chief Scout

== Statistics ==
=== Appearances and goals ===
Substitute appearances in brackets.

No	Pos	Nat	Name	League		FA Cup		League Cup		FL Trophy		Play-offs		Total	
No	Pos	Nat	Name	Apps	Goals	Apps	Goals	Apps	Goals	Apps	Goals	Apps	Goals	Apps	Goals
1	GK	(England)	Stuart Nelson	44 (1)	0	6	0	1	0	0	0	2	0	53 (1)	0
2	DF	(Republic of Ireland)	Kevin O'Connor	30	7	5	1	1	0	0	0	2	0	38	8
3	DF	(England)	Andy Frampton	36	3	4 (1)	0	0	0	0	0	2	0	42 (1)	3
4	DF	(Nigeria)	Sam Sodje	43	5	6	1	0	0	0	0	1	0	50	6
5	DF	(England)	Michael Turner	46	2	6	0	1	0	0	0	2	0	55	2
6	MF	(England)	Ricky Newman	29 (1)	3	5 (1)	0	0	0	1	0	2	0	37 (2)	3
7	MF	(England)	Paul Brooker	32 (4)	4	4 (2)	0	1	0	0	0	0 (2)	0	37 (8)	4
8	MF	(Iceland)	Ólafur Ingi Skúlason	2	0	0	0	0	0	0	0	0	0	2	0
9	FW	(Ghana)	Lloyd Owusu	39 (3)	12	6	2	0	0	0	0	0	0	45 (3)	14
10	FW	(England)	Scott P. Fitzgerald	3 (8)	1	0	0	1	0	1	1	0	0	5 (8)	2
11	MF	(Republic of Ireland)	Jay Tabb	42	6	5	0	0 (1)	0	0	0	2	1	49 (1)	7
12	DF	(England)	Michael Dobson	3 (3)	0	0 (1)	0	0	0	1	0	0	0	4 (4)	0
14	MF	(England)	Eddie Hutchinson	17 (10)	2	1 (2)	0	0	0	1	0	0	0	19 (12)	2
15	FW	(England)	Isaiah Rankin	31 (6)	7	2 (3)	2	0	0	0	0	2	0	35 (9)	9
16	FW	(Jamaica)	Marcus Gayle	16 (8)	2	2	0	1	0	1	0	1	0	21 (8)	2
17	MF	(England)	Alex Rhodes	5 (12)	1	0	0	0	0	0	0	1	0	6 (12)	1
18	DF	(England)	Sam Tillen	20 (13)	0	4 (2)	0	1	0	1	0	1 (1)	0	27 (16)	0
~~19~~	FW	(England)	DJ Campbell	13 (10)	9	4	3	1	0	0	0	—		18 (10)	12
19	FW	(Saint Kitts and Nevis)	Calum Willock	5 (8)	1	—		—		—		0 (1)	0	5 (9)	1
20	MF	(England)	Ryan Peters	1 (9)	1	0 (2)	0	1	0	1	0	0	0	2 (11)	1
22	MF	(England)	John Mousinho	3 (4)	0	1	0	—		1	0	0	0	5 (4)	0
24	MF	(England)	Junior Lewis	11 (3)	0	1	0	—		0	0	0	0	12 (3)	0
31	GK	(Nigeria)	Ademola Bankole	2	0	0	0	0	0	1	0	0 (1)	0	3 (1)	0
33	DF	(England)	Darius Charles	0 (2)	0	0	0	0	0	1	0	0	0	1 (2)	0
35	DF	(England)	Aaron Steele	0	0	0	0	0 (1)	0	0	0	—		0 (1)	0
36	DF	(England)	Karleigh Osborne	1	0	0	0	1	0	1	0	0	0	3	0
37	DF	(England)	Ryan Watts	0	0	0	0	0 (1)	0	0 (1)	0	0	0	0 (2)	0
39	FW	(England)	Charlie Ide	0	0	0	0	0	0	0 (1)	0	0	0	0 (1)	0
40	MF	(England)	George Moleski	0	0	0	0	0	0	0 (1)	0	—		0 (1)	0
	Players loaned in during the season														
~~22~~	MF	(England)	Joe Keenan	0 (3)	0	—		1	0	—		—		1 (3)	0
23	DF	(England)	Jamie Smith	7	0	—		—		—		2	0	9	0
29	MF	(England)	Darren Pratley	25 (7)	4	5	0	—		0	0	2	0	32 (7)	4

- Players listed in italics left the club mid-season.
- Source: Soccerbase

=== Goalscorers ===
No	Pos	Nat	Player	FL1	FAC	FLC	FLT	FLP	Total
9	FW	(Ghana)	Lloyd Owusu	12	2	0	0	0	14
~~19~~	FW	(England)	DJ Campbell	9	3	0	0	—	12
15	FW	(England)	Isaiah Rankin	7	2	0	0	0	9
2	DF	(Republic of Ireland)	Kevin O'Connor	7	1	0	0	0	8
11	MF	(Republic of Ireland)	Jay Tabb	6	0	0	0	1	7
4	DF	(Nigeria)	Sam Sodje	5	1	0	0	0	6
29	MF	(England)	Darren Pratley	4	0	—	0	0	4
7	MF	(England)	Paul Brooker	4	0	0	0	0	4
3	DF	(England)	Andy Frampton	3	0	0	0	0	3
6	MF	(England)	Ricky Newman	3	0	0	0	0	3
16	FW	(Jamaica)	Marcus Gayle	2	0	0	0	0	2
14	MF	(England)	Eddie Hutchinson	2	0	0	0	0	2
5	DF	(England)	Michael Turner	2	0	0	0	0	2
10	FW	(England)	Scott P. Fitzgerald	1	0	0	1	0	2
19	FW	(Saint Kitts and Nevis)	Calum Willock	1	—	—	—	0	1
20	MF	(England)	Ryan Peters	1	0	0	0	0	1
17	MF	(England)	Alex Rhodes	1	0	0	0	0	1
Opponents				2	0	0	0	0	2
Total				72	9	0	1	1	83

- Players listed in italics left the club mid-season.
- Source: Soccerbase

=== Discipline ===
No	Pos	Nat	Player	FL1		FAC		FLC		FLT		FLP		Total		Pts
No	Pos	Nat	Player	Booked	Sent off (straight red)	Booked	Sent off (straight red)	Booked	Sent off (straight red)	Booked	Sent off (straight red)	Booked	Sent off (straight red)	Booked	Sent off (straight red)	Pts
6	MF	(England)	Ricky Newman	8	1	1	0	0	0	1	0	0	0	10	1	13
4	DF	(Nigeria)	Sam Sodje	8	1	2	0	0	0	0	0	0	0	10	1	13
11	MF	(Republic of Ireland)	Jay Tabb	9	0	0	0	0	0	0	0	0	0	9	0	9
3	DF	(England)	Andy Frampton	6	1	0	0	0	0	0	0	0	0	6	1	9
29	MF	(England)	Darren Pratley	8	0	0	0	—		0	0	0	0	8	0	8
1	GK	(England)	Stuart Nelson	4	0	0	0	0	0	0	0	0	1	4	1	7
14	MF	(England)	Eddie Hutchinson	3	1	0	0	0	0	1	0	0	0	4	1	7
15	FW	(England)	Isaiah Rankin	5	0	0	0	0	0	0	0	1	0	6	0	6
9	FW	(Ghana)	Lloyd Owusu	5	0	0	0	0	0	0	0	0	0	5	0	5
5	DF	(England)	Michael Turner	4	0	0	0	0	0	0	0	0	0	4	0	4
2	DF	(Republic of Ireland)	Kevin O'Connor	2	0	1	0	1	0	0	0	0	0	4	0	4
7	MF	(England)	Paul Brooker	3	0	0	0	0	0	0	0	0	0	3	0	3
~~19~~	FW	(England)	DJ Campbell	0	1	0	0	0	0	0	0	—		0	1	3
12	DF	(England)	Michael Dobson	1	0	0	0	0	0	1	0	0	0	2	0	2
10	FW	(England)	Scott P. Fitzgerald	1	0	0	0	0	0	1	0	0	0	2	0	2
18	DF	(England)	Sam Tillen	1	0	0	0	0	0	1	0	0	0	2	0	2
31	GK	(Nigeria)	Ademola Bankole	1	0	0	0	0	0	0	0	0	0	1	0	1
24	MF	(England)	Junior Lewis	1	0	0	0	—		0	0	0	0	1	0	1
17	MF	(England)	Alex Rhodes	1	0	0	0	0	0	0	0	0	0	1	0	1
8	MF	(Iceland)	Ólafur Ingi Skúlason	1	0	0	0	0	0	0	0	0	0	1	0	1
40	MF	(England)	George Moleski	0	0	0	0	0	0	1	0	—		1	0	1
22	MF	(England)	John Mousinho	0	0	0	0	—		1	0	0	0	1	0	1
36	DF	(England)	Karleigh Osborne	0	0	0	0	1	0	0	0	0	0	1	0	1
Total				72	5	4	0	2	0	7	0	1	1	86	6	104

- Players listed in italics left the club mid-season.
- Source: ESPN FC

=== International caps ===
No	Pos	Nat	Player	Caps	Goals	Ref
4	DF	(Nigeria)	Sam Sodje	1	0	
9	FW	(Ghana)	Lloyd Owusu	2	0	

=== Management ===
Name	Nat	From	To	Record All Comps					Record League				
Name	Nat	From	To	P	W	D	L	W %	P	W	D	L	W %
Martin Allen	(England)	6 August 2005	14 May 2006	56	24	19	13	42.86|	46	20	16	10	43.48

=== Summary ===
Games played	56 (46 League One, 6 FA Cup, 1 League Cup, 1 Football League Trophy, 2 Football League play-offs)
Games won	24 (20 League One, 4 FA Cup, 0 League Cup, 0 Football League Trophy, 0 Football League play-offs)
Games drawn	19 (16 League One, 1 FA Cup, 0 League Cup, 1 Football League Trophy, 1 Football League play-offs)
Games lost	13 (10 League One, 1 FA Cup, 1 League Cup, 0 Football League Trophy, 1 Football League play-offs)
Goals scored	82 (72 League One, 9 FA Cup, 0 League Cup, 0 Football League Trophy, 1 Football League play-offs)
Goals conceded	68 (52 League One, 7 FA Cup, 5 League Cup, 1 Football League Trophy, 3 Football League play-offs)
Clean sheets	15 (13 League One, 2 FA Cup, 0 League Cup, 0 Football League Trophy, 0 Football League play-offs)
Biggest league win	5–0 versus Walsall, 4 February 2006
Worst league defeat	4–1 versus Southend United, 14 January 2006
Most appearances	54, Stuart Nelson (45 League One, 6 FA Cup, 1 League Cup, 0 Football League Trophy, 2 Football League play-offs)
Top scorer (league)	12, Lloyd Owusu
Top scorer (all competitions)	14, Lloyd Owusu

== Transfers & loans ==
Players transferred in
Date	Pos.	Name	Previous club	Fee	Ref.
1 July 2005	MF	(England) Paul Brooker	(England) Reading	Free	
1 July 2005	FW	(England) DJ Campbell	(England) Yeading	£5,000	
1 July 2005	MF	(England) Ricky Newman	(England) Reading	Free	
1 July 2005	FW	(Ghana) Lloyd Owusu	(England) Reading	Free	
1 July 2005	MF	(Iceland) Ólafur Ingi Skúlason	(England) Arsenal	Free	
1 July 2005	DF	(England) Sam Tillen	(England) Chelsea	Free	
25 August 2005	FW	(England) Junior Lewis	(England) Edgware Town	Free	
14 October 2005	MF	(England) John Mousinho	Unattached	Non-contract	
31 January 2006	FW	(Saint Kitts and Nevis) Calum Willock	(England) Peterborough United	£40,000	
Players loaned in
Date from	Pos.	Name	From	Date to	Ref.
8 August 2005	MF	(England) Joe Keenan	(England) Chelsea	8 September 2005	
30 August 2005	DF	(England) Darren Pratley	(England) Fulham	End of season	
15 March 2006	DF	(England) Jamie Smith	(England) Bristol City	End of season	
Players transferred out
Date	Pos.	Name	Subsequent club	Fee	Ref.
1 July 2005	FW	(England) Matt Harrold	(England) Yeovil Town	Undisclosed	
1 July 2005	MF	(England) Stewart Talbot	(England) Boston United	Undisclosed	
5 July 2004	MF	(England) Chris Hargreaves	(England) Oxford United	n/a	
1 August 2005	MF	(South Korea) San Lee	(England) Sheffield United	Free	
31 January 2006	FW	(England) DJ Campbell	(England) Birmingham City	£500,000	
Players loaned out
Date from	Pos.	Name	To	Date to	Ref.
August 2005	GK	(England) Clark Masters	(England) Redbridge	October 2005	
9 November 2005	MF	(England) John Mousinho	(England) Woking	13 November 2005	
23 November 2005	FW	(England) Scott P. Fitzgerald	(England) Oxford United	1 January 2006	
24 November 2005	DF	(England) Michael Dobson	(England) Reading	End of season	
November 2005	GK	(England) Clark Masters	(England) Slough Town	End of season	
November 2005	MF	(England) John Mousinho	(England) Slough Town	December 2005	
December 2005	DF	(England) Aaron Steele	(England) Slough Town	January 2006	
January 2006	MF	(England) George Moleski	(England) Slough Town	January 2006	
3 February 2006	DF	(England) Darius Charles	(England) Thurrock	March 2006	
16 February 2006	FW	(England) Scott P. Fitzgerald	(England) Walsall	13 April 2006	
February 2006	FW	(England) Charlie Ide	(England) Slough Town	End of season	
16 March 2006	DF	(England) Darius Charles	(England) Yeading	April 2006	
16 March 2006	DF	(England) Karleigh Osborne	(England) Hayes	End of season	
31 March 2006	MF	(England) John Mousinho	(England) Yeading	End of season	
Players released
Date	Pos.	Name	Subsequent club	Join date	Ref.
January 2006	DF	(England) Aaron Steele	(England) Slough Town	January 2006	
January 2006	MF	(England) George Moleski	(England) Slough Town	January 2006	
30 June 2006	GK	(Nigeria) Ademola Bankole	(England) Milton Keynes Dons	1 August 2006	
30 June 2006	DF	(England) Michael Dobson	(England) Walsall	3 July 2006	
30 June 2006	FW	(Jamaica) Marcus Gayle	(England) Aldershot Town	2 July 2006	
30 June 2006	MF	(England) Eddie Hutchinson	(England) Oxford United	4 July 2006	
30 June 2006	MF	(England) Junior Lewis	(England) Milton Keynes Dons	6 September 2006	
30 June 2006	MF	(England) Ricky Newman	(England) Aldershot Town	2 July 2006	
30 June 2006	FW	(England) Isaiah Rankin	(England) Grimsby Town	1 July 2006	
30 June 2006	DF	(England) Ryan Watts	(England) AFC Wimbledon	1 July 2006	

== Kit ==
Supplier: Lonsdale
Sponsor(s): St. George

Home	Away

Source: Historical Kits

== Awards ==
- Supporters' Player of the Year: Michael Turner
- Players' Player of the Year: Michael Turner & Jay Tabb (joint winners)
- Most Improved Player of the Year: Andy Frampton
- Football League One PFA Team of the Year: Sam Sodje
- Football League One Player of the Month: DJ Campbell (January 2006)
- Football League One Manager of the Month: Martin Allen (February 2006)
- Football League Community Club of the Year
- BBC London Sports Personality of 2005: Martin Allen
