= Pim Balkestein =

Dutch professional footballer

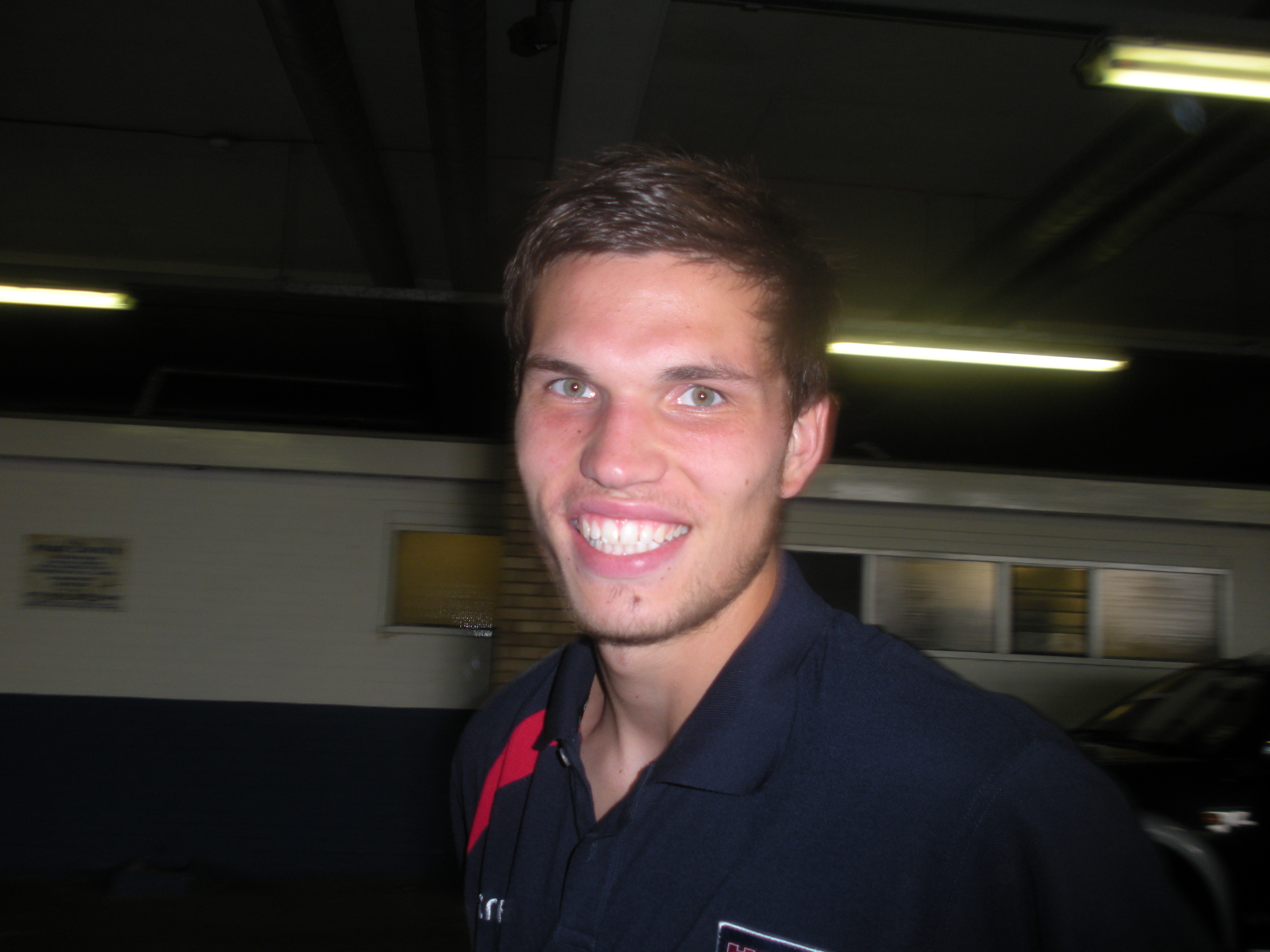
- Balkestein with Ipswich Town in 2009

Personal information
- Full name: Pim Balkestein
- Date of birth: 29 April 1987 (age 39)
- Place of birth: Gouda, Netherlands
- Height: 1.91 m (6 ft 3 in)
- Position: Centre back

Team information
- Current team: De Treffers (technical committee)

Youth career
- 2000–2006: Heerenveen

Senior career*
Years	Team	Apps	(Gls)
2006–2008	Heerenveen	0	(0)
2008–2010	Ipswich Town	29	(0)
2009	→ Brentford (loan)	8	(0)
2010	→ Brentford (loan)	6	(1)
2010–2012	Brentford	25	(1)
2011	→ Rochdale (loan)	13	(0)
2012	→ AFC Wimbledon (loan)	6	(0)
2012–2013	AFC Wimbledon	24	(2)
2013–2015	VVV-Venlo	60	(4)
2015–2016	SV Elversberg	4	(0)
2015–2016	SV Elversberg II	1	(0)
2016–2022	De Treffers	108	(13)
Total		284	(21)
- * Club domestic league appearances and goals

Pim Balkestein (born 29 April 1987) is a Dutch former professional footballer who played as a centre back. He could also play as a left-back and is the son of ex-footballer Luuk Balkestein.

== Career ==
=== Heerenveen ===
Balkestein was born in the Dutch city of Gouda on 29 April 1987. He is the son of former Sparta Rotterdam and Feyenoord player Luuk Balkestein. He came through the academy ranks at SC Heerenveen, making the step up from the under-19 squad to the first team for the 2006–07 season. However, the defender never made a first team appearance for the club. At the end of the 2007–08 season, Balkestein joined championship side Ipswich Town on trial, impressing manager Jim Magilton enough to be offered a permanent deal following his strong performance in a friendly for Ipswich Town Reserves against Tottenham Hotspur Reserves.

=== Ipswich Town ===
On 16 June 2008, Balkestein signed a two-year contract with Ipswich Town with the option of a further year extension. As a result of the transfer, a fee of £180,000 was paid to his former club SC Heerenveen as compensation. Balkestein made his professional and Football League debut for Ipswich Town on 9 August 2008 in a 2–1 defeat by Preston North End. The 21-year-old defender would go on to make 20 league appearances in total for Ipswich Town during the 2008–09 season. Balkestein also featured for "The Blues" in the first round of the 2008–09 League Cup in a 4–1 win over Leyton Orient on 12 August 2008 as well as in the third round fixture against Wigan Athletic on 24 September 2008 which ended as a 4–1 defeat. The defender also played for Ipswich Town in their 3–1 defeat by Chelsea at Stamford Bridge in the fourth round of the 2008–09 FA Cup on 24 January 2009. On 21 April 2009, Balkestein was named Ipswich Town's "Most Improved Player of the Year", as voted for by the club's coaching staff. At the beginning of the 2009–10 season, Balkestein made 6 league appearances for Ipswich Town before it was announced that he would join League One side Brentford on an initial one-month loan deal on 20 November 2009. The defender made his debut for Brentford on 21 November 2009 in a 1–1 draw with Walsall. On 21 December 2009, Brentford manager Andy Scott extended Balkestein's loan by a further month. The extension was short-lived however, as on 30 December 2009, Balkestein was recalled by his parent club in order to replace injured defender David Wright. Balkestein's last game for Ipswich Town came on 30 January 2010 against the same opposition as his first, Preston North End, in what would end as a 2–0 defeat. On 25 March 2010, Pim Balkestein returned to Brentford on loan until the end of the 2009–10 with a view to a permanent move. On 30 March 2010, Balkestein scored his first football league goal for Brentford in a 3–2 win over Oldham Athletic.

=== Brentford ===
Having made 14 appearances on loan at Brentford during the 2009–10 season, Balkestein joined the Bees on a permanent basis from Ipswich Town for an undisclosed fee on 6 August 2010, signing a three-year deal. The defender made 20 league appearances in total for Brentford during the 2010–11 season. Balkestein scored his second and last goal for the Bees in a 3–2 defeat by Walsall on 12 April 2011. Following the sacking of Andy Scott as Brentford manager on 3 February 2011, however, Balkestein quickly found himself out of favour and deemed surplus to requirements by successor to the post Uwe Rösler. As a result of this, Balkestein was loaned out for almost the entirety of the 2011–12 season. His first loan spell was to League One rivals Rochdale beginning on 19 August 2011 and running until 18 January 2012. Balkestein's debut for Rochdale came in a 2–0 defeat by Oldham Athletic on 20 August 2011. The defender would go on to make just 13 league appearances in total for Rochdale in the 2011–12 season, however, after being blighted by a reoccurring groin injury which forced him to return to his parent club to undergo minor surgery in November 2011. The 24-year-old returned to training at Rochdale on 5 December 2011. However, he would not go on to make another appearance for "The Dale" and subsequently returned to Brentford in January 2012, where he was told by Uwe Rösler that he had no future with the club. Balkestein subsequently joined League Two side AFC Wimbledon on a one-month loan deal on 9 March 2012. Balkestein made his debut for AFC Wimbledon in a 2–1 win over Dagenham & Redbridge on 10 March 2012. The defender would go on to make 6 league appearances in total for "The Dons", however, his loan spell would ultimately be cut short after an X-ray found that he had broken his toe in a 4–0 win over Burton Albion on 24 March 2012.

=== AFC Wimbledon ===
On 17 July 2012, Balkestein returned to AFC Wimbledon on a permanent deal after being released by Brentford. Balkestein scored his first goal for AFC Wimbledon on 21 August 2012 in a 6–2 defeat by Burton Albion. The 25-year-old defender scored his second for the club on 12 March 2013 in a 3–1 win over Southend United. Having made twenty–four appearances for "The Dons" during his second spell with the club, Balkestein was released by AFC Wimbledon on 14 May 2013.

=== Later career ===
After being released by AFC Wimbledon, Balkestein joined Dutch Eerste Divisie side VVV-Venlo on 12 June 2013, signing a three-year deal.

On 6 August 2015, it was announced that Balkestein had signed with German Regionalliga side SV Elversberg. He had his contract terminated in January 2016. Subsequently, Balkestein signed with Dutch Topklasse club De Treffers from Groesbeek. At De Treffers, he grew to become a key player and team captain. Balkestein retired at the end of the 2021–22 season and remained at the club in a backroom capacity.

== Career statistics ==
As of match played 6 October 2020

Appearances and goals by club, season and competition
Club	Season	League			National cup (Note: Includes KNVB Cup, FA Cup, DFB-Pokal)		League cup (Note: Includes Football League Cup)		Other		Total	
Club	Season	Division	Apps	Goals	Apps	Goals	Apps	Goals	Apps	Goals	Apps	Goals
Heerenveen	2007–08	Eredivisie	0	0	3	0	—		0	0	3	0
Ipswich Town	2008–09	Championship	20	0	1	0	2	0	—		23	0
Ipswich Town	2009–10	Championship	9	0	0	0	1	0	—		10	0
Ipswich Town	Total		29	0	1	0	3	0	0	0	33	0
Brentford (loan)	2009–10	League One	14	1	0	0	0	0	0	0	14	1
Brentford	2010–11	League One	20	1	1	0	2	0	4 (Note: Appearance(s) in Football League Trophy)	0	27	1
Brentford	2011–12	League One	5	0	0	0	0	0	0	0	5	0
Brentford	Total		39	2	1	0	2	0	4	0	46	2
Rochdale (loan)	2011–12	League One	13	0	0	0	2	0	0	0	15	0
AFC Wimbledon (loan)	2011–12	League Two	6	0	0	0	0	0	0	0	6	0
AFC Wimbledon	2012–13	League Two	24	2	1	0	1	0	1	0	27	2
AFC Wimbledon	Total		30	2	1	0	1	0	1	0	33	2
VVV-Venlo	2013–14	Eerste Divisie	36	3	2	0	—		—		38	3
VVV-Venlo	2014–15	Eerste Divisie	24	1	2	0	—		3 (Note: Appearances in Eerste Divisie play-offs)	0	29	1
VVV-Venlo	Total		60	4	4	0	—		3	0	67	4
SV Elversberg	2015–16	Regionalliga Südwest	4	0	0	0	—		—		4	0
SV Elversberg II	2015–16	Oberliga Rheinland-Pfalz/Saar	1	0	—		—		—		1	0
De Treffers	2015–16	Derde Divisie B	9	0	0	0	—		—		9	0
De Treffers	2016–17	Tweede Divisie	32	3	1	0	—		—		33	3
De Treffers	2017–18	Tweede Divisie	28	5	2	0	—		—		30	5
De Treffers	2018–19	Tweede Divisie	20	5	1	0	—		—		21	5
De Treffers	2019–20	Tweede Divisie	0	0	0	0	—		—		0	0
De Treffers	2020–21	Tweede Divisie	2	0	1	0	—		—		3	0
De Treffers	2021–22	Tweede Divisie	17	0	0	0	—		—		17	0
De Treffers	Total		108	13	5	0	—		—		113	13
Career total			284	21	15	0	8	0	8	0	298	21
