= Kevin O'Connor (footballer, born 1982) =

English-Irish footballer

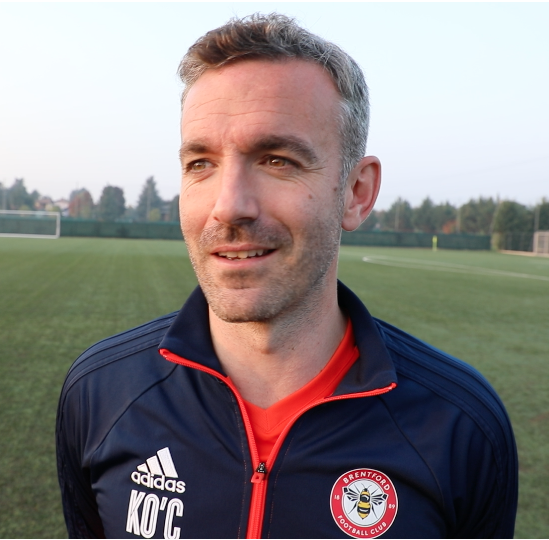
- O'Connor in 2017

Personal information
- Full name: Kevin Patrick O'Connor
- Date of birth: 24 February 1982 (age 44)
- Place of birth: Blackburn, England
- Height: 5 ft 11 in (1.80 m)
- Position: Utility player

Team information
- Current team: Brentford (first team coach)

Youth career
- –1995: Southampton
- 1995–1999: Brentford

Senior career*
Years	Team	Apps	(Gls)
1999–2015	Brentford	426	(32)

International career
2003	Republic of Ireland U21	6	(0)

Managerial career
- 2016–2018: Brentford B
- * Club domestic league appearances and goals

Kevin Patrick O'Connor (born 24 February 1982) is a professional football coach and former player who is currently the first team coach of Premier League club Brentford.

A utility player and one-club man, at the time of his retirement in 2015 he was Brentford's longest serving player, having signed his first professional contract in 1999. O'Connor made over 500 appearances for the club and is fourth on the most Brentford appearances list, captained the club on over 200 occasions and was inducted into the Brentford Hall of Fame in 2015. Born in England, he represented the Republic of Ireland national under-21 team at international level.

== Career ==
=== 1999–2001: Early years ===
After two years as a schoolboy with Southampton, O'Connor joined Second Division club Brentford as a schoolboy in 1995. He began his career as a forward and was awarded a scholarship in 1998. After a run of 23 goals in 30 games for the reserves, O'Connor received his maiden call into the first team squad for a league match against Cardiff City on 12 February 2000 and remained an unused substitute during the 1–1 draw. O'Connor made his Brentford debut in a 3–2 Football League Trophy semi-final defeat at Exeter City on 15 February 2000, replacing Ívar Ingimarsson after 85 minutes. He was awarded his first start in a goalless league draw with Wycombe Wanderers on 19 February 2000 and signed a two-year professional contract on the same day. O'Connor made seven appearances during the 1999–2000 season.

A succession of injuries meant that O'Connor had to wait until December 2000 for his first appearance of the 2000–01 season, starting in a 2–2 league draw with Wigan Athletic, before being substituted for Mark Williams on 62 minutes. O'Connor's appearance against Wigan was the first of a run in the team and he scored the first senior goal of his career in a 2–1 league win over Bristol City on 20 February 2001. He made 12 appearances during the 2000–01 season and scored one goal. He found himself utilised in "the hole" by outgoing manager Ray Lewington.

=== 2001–2004: Breakthrough ===
O'Connor became a regular second-half substitute under new manager Steve Coppell during the 2001–02 season. He appeared in two of Brentford's three playoff games and endured heartbreak in the 2002 Second Division playoff Final as the Bees were denied a place in the First Division by 2–0 winners Stoke City in his first appearance at the Millennium Stadium, due to his absence from the 2001 Football League Trophy Final squad. O'Connor made 32 appearances during the 2001–02 season, scoring one goal.

O'Connor was an ever-present as a right winger under new manager Wally Downes during the 2002–03 season and scored his first ever brace with two penalties in a 3–3 League Cup second round draw with AFC Bournemouth on 10 September 2002, in addition to converting a third penalty in the resulting shootout. Through November 2002 to January 2003, O'Connor went on a run of scoring five goals in 11 games and finished the 2002–03 season having scored 9 goals in 53 appearances.

After signing a new three-year contract in June 2003, O'Connor appeared consistently during the 2003–04 season and kept his place in the team following the sacking of Downes and the appointment of Martin Allen as manager in March 2004. He scored the equaliser in a 1–1 draw with bitter rivals Queens Park Rangers in the West London derby on 14 February 2004.

=== 2004–2007: Conversion to right back ===
O'Connor began the 2004–05 season as a substitute, but an injury to Michael Dobson in a 4–1 defeat to Bristol City (a game in which O'Connor scored) on 30 August saw Martin Allen press O'Connor into service as a right back for much of the season. O'Connor was awarded the captaincy for the first time for a match against Hartlepool United on 19 October. He made 44 appearances during the 2004–05 season and scored two goals as Brentford failed to progress past Sheffield Wednesday in the 2005 playoff semi-finals. O'Connor's performances in his new right back position earned him the "Most Improved Player Of The Year" award. After the season, he signed a two-year contract extension.

O'Connor was Martin Allen's first-choice right back for the 2005–06 season and became the club's regular penalty taker, scoring from the spot against Rochdale, Tranmere Rovers and Walsall. O'Connor was again nominated for the club's "Most Improved Player Of The Year" award. He finished the 2005–06 season having scored eight goals in 38 appearances, but once again he suffered playoff heartbreak as Brentford failed over overcome Swansea City in the 2006 playoff semi-finals.

O'Connor was promoted to captain under new manager Leroy Rosenior during the early months of the 2006–07 season. He signed a contract extension in September 2006, which would run until the end of the 2008–09 season. O'Connor made 43 appearances and scored seven goals during the 2006–07 season, but his efforts to prevent Brentford suffering relegation with a bottom-place finish in League One were in vain.

=== 2007–2009: Central midfield ===
Following the signings of right backs Ben Starosta and Craig Pead by new manager Terry Butcher prior to the 2007–08 season, O'Connor played predominantly in central midfield for his first season in League Two, though he lost the captaincy to new signing John Mackie. He had a good start to the season, scoring in consecutive games against Notts County and Barnet in August 2007. O'Connor made 41 appearances and scored three goals as Brentford finished in mid-table.

Under new manager Andy Scott, O'Connor was named captain and began the 2008–09 season as a starter, but he lost his place in the team after being sent off for the only time in his career, just 14 minutes after coming on for Craig Pead in a 2–1 league win over Dagenham & Redbridge on 6 September 2008. After a period out of favour, an injury to replacement captain Adam Newton in November 2008 saw O'Connor regain the armband and he went on to form a midfield partnership with Marcus Bean. He made his 300th start for Brentford on 7 February 2009 against Chester City at Griffin Park. Despite missing the last 9 games of the 2008–09 season with a knee ligament injury, O'Connor made 33 appearances and scored one goal as Brentford were promoted as League Two champions. He held the winners' trophy aloft with stand-in captain Alan Bennett after the final game of the season against Luton Town.

=== 2009–2011: Captain ===
O'Connor signed a new two-year contract in June 2009. Back in League One for the 2009–10 season, O'Connor appeared in all but three of Brentford's matches, making 49 appearances and scoring five goals. He scored a brace of penalties in a 2–1 league victory over Tranmere Rovers on 29 September 2009. He made his 400th Bees appearance in a 3–2 defeat to Swindon Town on 1 May 2010. After completing 10 years of continuous service as a Brentford player, O'Connor was awarded a testimonial on 14 July 2010 against local rivals Fulham.

O'Connor began the 2010–11 season as an ever-present in central midfield and scored his only two goals of the season in a 3–0 away league victory over Tranmere Rovers on 16 October 2010. In January 2011, he signed a new 2 1/2 year contract. After the appointment of forward Nicky Forster as interim manager (replacing the sacked Andy Scott) in February 2011, O'Connor found himself in and out of the team and was "extremely disappointed" that he was denied the chance to lead the team out as captain at Wembley Stadium in the 2011 Football League Trophy Final, despite having started in every game on the way to the final. O'Connor appeared as an 88th-minute substitute appearance in the game, which Brentford lost 1–0 to Carlisle United. O'Connor made 53 appearances during the 2010–11 season.

=== 2011–2014: Injury hell ===
Under new manager Uwe Rösler, O'Connor began the 2011–12 season mostly as a substitute and suffered a serious ankle injury in a 1–0 FA Cup first round win over Basingstoke Town on 12 November. He had made 18 appearances and scored two goals before the injury ended his season. O'Connor returned to the team in time for the start of the 2012–13 season and featured regularly as a substitute. After making 11 appearances, he suffered a serious leg and ankle injury while falling in a tackle in a 1–0 victory over Portsmouth on 6 November 2012 and it was determined that he would be out for six months. O'Connor signed a new one-year contract in March 2013. He returned to the first team on 16 April 2013, as a substitute for Lee Hodson after 66 minutes of a pulsating 2–2 draw with Sheffield United, a game which saw Tony Craig and Clayton Donaldson sent off for Brentford. Craig's three match suspension began on Brentford's penultimate game of the season against Hartlepool United. Still not fully fit, O'Connor filled in at centre back alongside Harlee Dean in the 1–1 draw, having never played the position before.

==== Doncaster Rovers penalty incident ====
Brentford's final game of the 2012–13 season was against Doncaster Rovers at Griffin Park, with the Bees needing to win to secure automatic promotion to the Championship. With the score at 0–0, Brentford were awarded a penalty in added time. Before the game, the team was made aware that O'Connor was Uwe Rösler's designated penalty taker, but substitute striker Marcello Trotta grabbed the ball from O'Connor, with the intent to take the penalty. Trotta crashed the spot kick against the bar and Doncaster scored a breakaway goal through James Coppinger to win 1–0 and consign Brentford to the playoffs. O'Connor admitted after the game that he "tried to follow orders but Trotts has gone into the zone, got the ball and he was extremely confident. What can you say? If he scores it, it's perfect but unfortunately he's missed it and it's cost us". O'Connor later iterated that if Brentford were awarded a penalty during the playoffs, he would take it.

==== 2013 playoffs and reaching 500 appearances ====
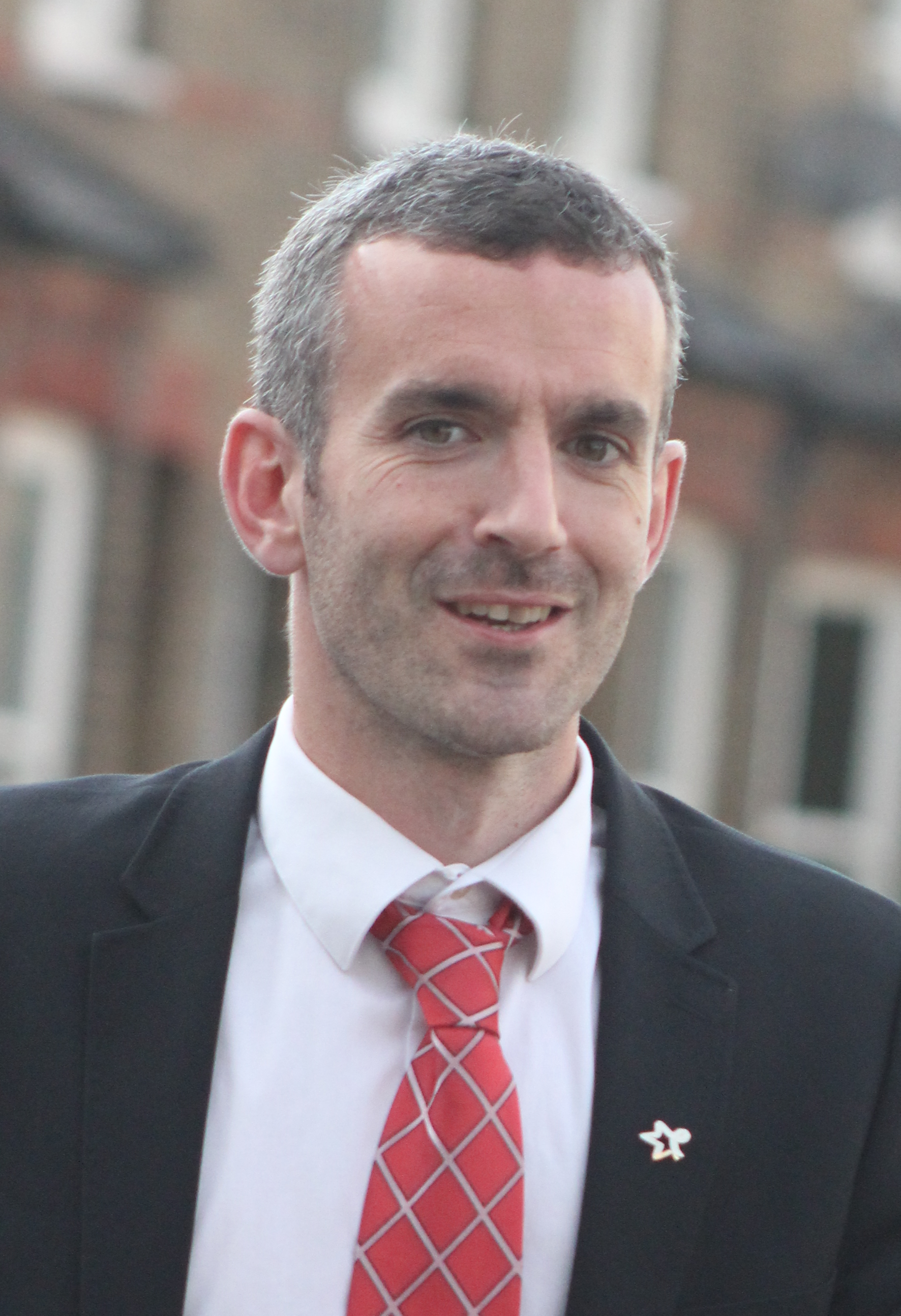
O'Connor in April 2014.

Brentford met Swindon Town in the semi-finals of the 2013 playoffs and trailing 1–0 in the first leg, the Bees were awarded an injury time penalty, which O'Connor converted. It proved to be his last appearance of the season after Tony Craig had served his suspension and returned to the starting lineup. O'Connor was an unused substitute during the 2013 League One playoff Final, which was won 2–1 by Yeovil Town. He made 16 appearances during the 2012–13 season.

O'Connor returned fully fit for the 2013–14 season and once again deputised at centre back for Tony Craig in the 1–1 opening day draw with Port Vale. A groin injury suffered in October 2013 saw O'Connor miss two months of the season. After returning to fitness, made his first appearance in over four months with a start in a 2–0 win over Port Vale on 11 January 2014. O'Connor then deputised at centre back in three successive matches, alongside Tony Craig. He signed a new one-year contract on 20 March 2014, which would see him take on a player-coach role. Following automatic promotion to the Championship with three matches to spare, Manager Mark Warburton played O'Connor appeared in each of the remaining matches, in order to bring him up to 500 Brentford appearances. After the final game against Stevenage concluded, O'Connor jointly lifted the League One runners-up trophy with stand-in captain Tony Craig. He finished the 2013–14 season with 12 appearances and won a Special Achievement Award for reaching 500 appearances.

=== 2014–2015: Player-coach and retirement ===
O'Connor made his only appearance of the 2014–15 season in a League Cup first round match versus Dagenham & Redbridge on 12 August 2014. He started the match, which finished 6–6 after extra time and had to be settled with a penalty shootout. With his last kick for the club, O'Connor scored the winning penalty. Mark Warburton hinted in December 2014 that O'Connor had come to the end of his playing days, saying "he has had a great career, but he's not stupid and knows the focus has got to be on the next stage of his career now". On 3 May 2015, O'Connor was inducted into the Brentford Hall of Fame, the first person to be inducted while still under contract to the club. Following Brentford's defeat to Middlesbrough in the playoff semi-finals, he announced his retirement from football.

O'Connor made 501 appearances and scored 44 goals in 16 seasons at Griffin Park. He finished his career in fourth position on Brentford's all-time record appearances list and until October 2022, he was the club record holder for penalties scored in all competitions, with 19. For his service to Brentford, he was presented with the Sir Tom Finney Award at the 2017 EFL Awards. In December 2022, in recognition of more than a quarter of a century of service to Brentford, a room at the club's new Robert Rowan Performance Centre was named in O'Connor's honour.

== International career ==
Owing to his Irish heritage, O'Connor's form for Brentford during the 2002–03 season saw him called up by Republic of Ireland U21 manager Don Givens for his team's 2004 European U21 Championship qualifying campaign. He made his debut in a 1–1 away draw with Georgia on 28 March 2003, coming on as a substitute for John Thompson after 81 minutes and setting up the equalising goal with a pass to Noel Hunt. O'Connor made his first start two days later in a 1–0 defeat to Albania, lasting 76 minutes before being taken off for Hunt. He won four further caps in 2003, against Georgia, Russia, Switzerland and a friendly versus Poland.

== Coaching career ==
=== Early years ===
O'Connor began taking his coaching badges in 2009. He studied for his FA Level 3 coaching badge in May 2014. He enrolled on the UEFA B Licence course in the early months of the 2014–15 season (studying alongside former teammate Alan Bennett) and gained the qualification in December 2014. From the beginning of the 2014–15 season, O'Connor assumed coaching responsibilities at Brentford and began working with the first team, Development Squad and academy players and staff. As of December 2015, he was working on his UEFA A Licence and by June 2019, he had received his UEFA Pro Licence.

=== Brentford B and Development Squad coach (2015–2018) ===
On 25 May 2015, shortly after his retirement as a player, O'Connor was announced as Brentford's Development Squad assistant coach, working under head coach Lee Carsley. On 29 September 2015, O'Connor took over from Carsley and remained Head Coach until 4 January 2016, when he reverted to his previous position upon the appointment of Flemming Pedersen. On 17 November 2016, O'Connor took over the permanent role of Brentford B head coach from Pedersen and stayed in the position until mid-December 2018.

=== Brentford assistant first team coach (2018–present) ===
On 13 December 2018, O'Connor was named as assistant coach of the Brentford first team, working under head coach Thomas Frank and assistant head coach Brian Riemer. His role was described as a bridge between the players and the coaching staff and between the first team and the B team, with a focus on coaching the offensive side of the game. By 2022, his matchday role had progressed to feeding then-assistant head coach Brian Riemer with information from a position up in the stand, behind the technical area. By December 2024, he was assisting assistant head coach Claus Nørgaard with defensive training and "constructing the opposition" for set piece coach Keith Andrews' drills.

== Personal life ==
O'Connor was born to Irish parents in Blackburn – his father Pat is from County Kerry and his mother Sheila was from County Mayo and the family moved back to South London four days after O'Connor was born. He has two brothers (Stephen and Damian) and his sister Kerry was also a footballer on the books at Chelsea and Barnet during the 2000s. Sheila died in July 2007. O'Connor attended The Douay Martyrs School in Ickenham. He married Penny in Las Vegas in June 2005 and as of February 2009 was living in Langley.

== Career statistics ==
Appearances and goals by club, season and competition
Club	Season	League			FA Cup		League Cup		FL Trophy		Play-offs		Total	
Club	Season	Division	Apps	Goals	Apps	Goals	Apps	Goals	Apps	Goals	Apps	Goals	Apps	Goals
Brentford	1999–2000	Second Division	6	0	0	0	0	0	1	0	—		7	0
Brentford	2000–01	Second Division	11	1	0	0	0	0	1	0	—		12	1
Brentford	2001–02	Second Division	25	0	2	0	2	1	1	0	2	0	32	1
Brentford	2002–03	Second Division	45	5	4	1	2	2	2	1	—		53	9
Brentford	2003–04	Second Division	43	1	2	1	1	0	2	0	—		48	2
Brentford	2004–05	League One	37	2	5	0	1	0	0	0	1	0	44	2
Brentford	2005–06	League One	30	7	5	1	1	0	0	0	2	0	38	8
Brentford	2006–07	League One	39	6	1	0	1	1	2	0	—		43	7
Brentford	2007–08	League Two	37	3	2	0	1	0	1	0	—		41	3
Brentford	2008–09	League Two	28	0	2	0	1	0	2	1	—		33	1
Brentford	2009–10	League One	43	4	4	1	1	0	1	0	—		49	5
Brentford	2010–11	League One	41	2	2	0	4	0	6	0	—		53	2
Brentford	2011–12	League One	14	1	1	0	1	0	2	1	—		18	2
Brentford	2012–13	League One	12	0	1	0	1	0	1	0	1	1	16	1
Brentford	2013–14	League One	9	0	0	0	2	0	1	0	—		12	0
Brentford	2014–15	Championship	0	0	0	0	1	0	—		0	0	1	0
Total			420	32	31	4	20	4	23	2	6	1	501	44

== Honours ==
Brentford

- Football League One second-place promotion: 2013–14
- Football League Two: 2008–09
- Football League Trophy runner-up: 2010–11

Individual

- Brentford Most Improved Player of the Year: 2004–05
- Brentford Special Achievement Award: 2013–14
- Brentford Hall of Fame
- Sir Tom Finney Award: 2017

== See also ==
- List of one-club men
