= Ryan Blake (footballer) =

English footballer

Personal information
- Full name: Ryan George Blake
- Date of birth: 8 December 1991 (age 34)
- Place of birth: Weybridge, England
- Height: 1.73 m (5 ft 8 in)
- Position: Left back

Team information
- Current team: Virginia Water

Youth career
- –2010: Brentford

Senior career*
Years	Team	Apps	(Gls)
2010–2012	Brentford	1	(0)
2010	→ Woking (loan)	3	(0)
2011	→ Ebbsfleet United (loan)	11	(0)
2011	→ Farnborough (loan)	4	(1)
2012	→ Hampton & Richmond Borough (loan)	2	(0)
2012–2013	Ebbsfleet United	8	(0)
2013–2014	Chertsey Town		(3)
2014	Kingstonian	4	(0)
2020–	Virginia Water	72	(1)

International career
2010	Northern Ireland U19	1	(0)
2010–2011	Northern Ireland U21	3	(0)
- * Club domestic league appearances and goals as of 18:46, 22 August 2026 (UTC)

Ryan George Blake (born 8 December 1991) is an English former professional footballer who plays as a left back for Combined Counties League Premier Division South club Virginia Water.

Blake is a product of the Brentford youth system and made one Football League appearance for the club. After his release in 2012, he dropped into non-League football. Blake was capped by Northern Ireland at youth level.

== Career ==
=== Brentford ===
A left back, Blake began his career in the Centre of Excellence at Brentford and signed a two-year scholarship during the 2008 off-season. He was an unused substitute on 19 occasions during the 2009–10 League One season and made what would be his only senior appearance for the club as a substitute for Lionel Ainsworth in a 1–1 draw with Yeovil Town on 24 April 2010.

Despite signing his first professional contract during the 2010 off-season, Blake found his first team chances limited during the 2010–11 season and was an unused substitute on just four occasions. He was loaned to Conference South clubs Woking and Ebbsfleet United during the season and made 16 appearances across both spells.

Blake signed new a one-year contract to be part of the Development Squad for the 2011–12 season and spent much of the season on loan at Conference South clubs Farnborough and Hampton & Richmond Borough. He failed to feature at all under new manager Uwe Rösler and was released when his contract expired in June 2012.

=== Non-League football ===
Following an unsuccessful trial with Lincoln City, Blake returned to then-Conference Premier club Ebbsfleet United on a permanent contract during the 2012 off-season. He made only eight appearances during his only full season with the club, which suffered relegation to the Conference South.

Blake transferred to Southern League First Division Central club Chertsey Town in August 2013 and was awarded the captaincy. He transferred Isthmian League Premier Division club Kingstonian during the 2014 off-season, but made only 8 appearances, with his final match coming in early December 2014.

Blake re-entered non-League football with Hellenic League Premier Division club Virginia Water in 2020. The club transferred to the Combined Counties League Premier Division North in 2021 and Blake progressed to become club captain.

== International career ==
Blake was capped by Northern Ireland at U19 and U21 level. He made his U19 debut in a 2–2 2010 European U19 championship elite qualifying draw with Russia on 23 May 2010, coming on as a 41st-minute substitute for Dean Jarvis. Blake made his U21 debut on 3 September 2010, coming on as an 86th-minute substitute for Paddy McLaughlin in a 4–0 2011 European U21 Championship qualifying victory over San Marino. He made his second U21 appearance in a friendly against Wales on 9 February 2011, starting the match and playing an hour before being substituted.

== Career statistics ==
As of match played 22 August 2026

Appearances and goals by club, season and competition
Club	Season	League			National cup (Note: Includes FA Cup)		League cup (Note: Includes Football League Cup, Isthmian League Cup, Hellenic League Challenge Cup, Combined Counties League Premier Challenge Cup)		Other		Total	
Club	Season	Division	Apps	Goals	Apps	Goals	Apps	Goals	Apps	Goals	Apps	Goals
Brentford	2009–10	League One	1	0	0	0	0	0	0	0	1	0
Brentford	2010–11	League One	0	0	—		0	0	0	0	0	0
Brentford	Total		1	0	0	0	0	0	0	0	1	0
Woking (loan)	2010–11	Conference South	3	0	1	0	—		—		4	0
Ebbsfleet United (loan)	2010–11	Conference South	11	0	—		—		1 (Note: Appearance in FA Trophy)	0	12	0
Farnborough (loan)	2011–12	Conference South	4	1	—		—		1	0	5	1
Hampton & Richmond Borough (loan)	2011–12	Conference South	3	0	—		—		—		3	0
Ebbsfleet United	2012–13	Conference Premier	8	0	0	0	—		0	0	8	0
Kingstonian	2014–15	Isthmian League Premier Division	4	0	2	0	1	0	1 (Note: Appearance in Surrey Senior Cup)	0	8	0
Virginia Water	2020–21	Hellenic League Premier Division	5	0	1	0	7	0	0	0	13	0
Virginia Water	2021–22	Combined Counties League Premier Division North	14	0	0	0	0	0	1 (Note: Appearance in Southern Combination Challenge Cup)	0	15	0
Virginia Water	2022–23	Combined Counties League Premier Division North	22	0	0	0	2	0	1	0	25	0
Virginia Water	2023–24	Combined Counties League Premier Division North	20	0	1	0	4	0	4 (Note: 2 appearances in Southern Combination Challenge Cup, 2 appearances in FA Vase)	0	29	0
Virginia Water	2024–25	Combined Counties League Premier Division North	4	0	1	0	0	0	0	0	5	0
Virginia Water	2025–26	Combined Counties League Premier Division North	6	1	0	0	1	0	2 (Note: 1 appearance in Surrey Senior Cup, 1 appearance in Southern Combination Challenge Cup)	0	9	1
Virginia Water	2026–27	Combined Counties League Premier Division South	1	0	0	0	0	0	0	0	1	0
Virginia Water	Total		72	1	3	0	7	0	8	0	96	1
Virginia Water Reserves	2021–22	Surrey Premier County League	1	0	—		—		—		1	0
Career total			107	2	6	0	15	0	11	0	139	2
