= Aaron Steele (footballer, born 1987) =

English footballer

Personal information
- Date of birth: 1 February 1987 (age 39)
- Place of birth: Twickenham, England
- Position: Defender

Youth career
- –2005: Brentford

Senior career*
Years	Team	Apps	(Gls)
2005–2006	Brentford	0	(0)
2005–2006	→ Slough Town (loan)	4	(0)
2006	Slough Town	15	(0)
- * Club domestic league appearances and goals

Aaron Steele (born 1 February 1987) is an English retired footballer who played as a defender. He began his career at Brentford, for whom he made one professional appearance, before joining Slough Town in 2005 and retiring in 2006.

== Playing career ==
=== Brentford ===
Steele began his career as a youth at Brentford. His maiden call into the first team squad came for the final League One match of the 2004–05 regular season against already-promoted Hull City and he was an unused substitute during the 2–1 victory. Steele did not feature in Brentford's unsuccessful 2005 playoff campaign, but the decision to release him was reversed and he was retained as a third-year scholar for the 2005–06 season.

Steele received his first call into the first team squad of the 2005–06 season for a League Cup first round match against League Two club Cheltenham Town on 23 August 2005 and made his professional debut when he came on as a substitute for Ryan Peters in the 86th minute of the 5–0 defeat. He was called into the first team again for a Football League Trophy first round match with Oxford United on 18 October, but remained on the bench during the shootout defeat. Steele was informed in January 2006 that he would not be offered a professional contract and he departed Griffin Park.

=== Slough Town ===
Steele joined Isthmian League Premier Division club Slough Town on loan in December 2005 and the move was made permanent in January 2006. He made 23 appearances during the second half of the 2005–06 season and retired from football.

== Personal life ==
After his retirement from football in 2006, Steele began working as a petroleum operator for the army.

== Career statistics ==
Appearances and goals by club, season and competition
Club	Season	League			FA Cup		League Cup		Other		Total	
Club	Season	Division	Apps	Goals	Apps	Goals	Apps	Goals	Apps	Goals	Apps	Goals
Brentford	2004–05	League One	0	0	0	0	0	0	0	0	0	0
Brentford	2005–06	League One	0	0	0	0	1	0	0	0	1	0
Brentford	Total		0	0	0	0	1	0	0	0	1	0
Slough Town	2005–06	Isthmian League Premier Division	19	0	—		—		4 (Note: 2 appearances in Berks & Bucks Senior Cup, 2 appearances in Isthmian League Cup)	0	23	0
Career total			19	0	0	0	1	0	4	0	24	0
