= Ryan Watts (footballer) =

English footballer (born 1988)

Personal information
- Full name: Ryan Dale Watts
- Date of birth: 18 May 1988 (age 38)
- Place of birth: Greenford, England
- Height: 5 ft 9 in (1.75 m)
- Positions: Left back; left winger

Team information
- Current team: Maidenhead United (first team coach)

Youth career
- 1999–2005: Brentford

Senior career*
Years	Team	Apps	(Gls)
2005–2006	Brentford	1	(0)
2006	AFC Wimbledon	0	(0)
2006–2007	Sutton United	1	(0)
2007–2008	Carshalton Athletic	36	(1)
2008–2011	Harrow Borough	97	(9)
2011	Barnet	0	(0)
2011–2012	St Albans City	51	(2)
2012	→ Truro City (loan)	0	(0)
2012–2013	Braintree Town	11	(0)
2013–2014	Tonbridge Angels	28	(0)
2014	Metropolitan Police	7	(0)
2014–2015	Wealdstone	33	(0)
Total		265	(12)
- * Club domestic league appearances and goals

Ryan Dale Watts (born 18 May 1988) is an English retired semi-professional footballer who played as a left back or left winger.

Watts began his career in the Football League at Brentford and dropped into non-League football upon his release in 2006. He made nearly 300 appearances for a number of National, Isthmian and Southern League clubs before his retirement in 2015.

== Club career ==
=== Brentford ===
Watts began his career as a youth at Brentford. He was the leading appearance maker and joint-leading scorer for the U17 team during the 2003–04 season. Watts was part of the Brentford youth team which beat Arsenal in the third round of the 2004–05 FA Youth Cup. He scored in extra time to level the score at 2–2 and send the tie to penalties. Watts' first involvement with the first team came on 7 May 2005, when he was named as a substitute in a youthful squad for the final League One game of the 2004–05 regular season at home to Hull City. The then-16-year-old Watts made his senior debut after 78 minutes of the 2–1 win, as a substitute for Matt Harrold. He failed to feature during Brentford's unsuccessful playoff campaign.

Watts made his first appearance of the 2005–06 season in a 5–0 League Cup defeat at Cheltenham Town on 23 August 2005, as a substitute for Paul Brooker after 74 minutes. He made another appearance in a Football League Trophy first round shootout defeat to Oxford United on 18 October, as a substitute for George Moleski (who in turn had replaced Eddie Hutchinson during the first half) during extra time. Watts was not called into the first team again and was released in June 2006. He made three first team appearances during his time at Griffin Park.

=== Non-League football ===
After two unsuccessful trials at Championship club Ipswich Town, Watts appeared sparingly for Isthmian League Premier Division and Conference South clubs AFC Wimbledon and Sutton United during the first half of the 2006–07 season. Watts transferred to Isthmian League Premier Division club Carshalton Athletic in January 2007 and made 39 appearances, scoring one goal. He transferred to Isthmian League Premier Division club Harrow Borough in August 2008. He had a successful 2008–09 season and was voted the club's Player's Player Of The Season and Supporters' Player Of The Year. In the 2010–11 season, Watts played in Harrow's 2–0 FA Cup first round defeat to Chesterfield and suffered heartbreak as the club lost to Tonbridge Angels in the playoff semi-finals. By the time of his departure in August 2011, Watts had made 108 appearances and scored 9 goals.

=== Barnet ===
Wells made a return to the Football League when he signed a one-month contract at League Two club Barnet on 2 August 2011. He failed to win a call into a squad and was released at the end of his contract.

=== Return to non-League football ===
Watts transferred to Southern League Premier Division club St Albans City in September 2011 and made 61 appearances, scoring three goals, prior to transferring to Conference Premier club Braintree Town on 17 December 2012. Featuring mainly as a substitute, he made 11 appearances during the remainder of the 2012–13 season and helped the club fight its way from the relegation places to a 9th-place finish. Watts spent the 2013–14 season with Conference South club Tonbridge Angels, for whom he made 29 appearances and scored one goal.

Watts dropped a division to sign for Isthmian League Premier Division club Metropolitan Police in July 2014. He made 9 appearances before transferring to Conference South club Wealdstone in mid-September 2014. Watts made 39 appearances during 14 months at Grosvenor Vale, before departing the club due to injury problems and work commitments.

== Coaching career ==
As of June 2025, Watts was strength and conditioning coach at Hendon. As of December 2025, he was first team coach at Maidenhead United.

== Personal life ==
Watts has a son and works as a gym instructor and nutritionist.

== Career statistics ==
Appearances and goals by club, season and competition
Club	Season	League			FA Cup		League Cup		Other		Total	
Club	Season	Division	Apps	Goals	Apps	Goals	Apps	Goals	Apps	Goals	Apps	Goals
Brentford	2004–05	League One	1	0	0	0	0	0	0	0	1	0
Brentford	2005–06	League One	0	0	0	0	1	0	1 (Note: Appearance in Football League Trophy)	0	2	0
Brentford	Total		0	0	0	0	1	0	1	0	3	0
AFC Wimbledon	2006–07	Isthmian League Premier Division	0	0	0	0	—		1 (Note: Appearances in Isthmian League Cup)	0	1	0
Sutton United	2006–07	Conference South	1	0	—		—		0	0	1	0
Carshalton Athletic	2006–07	Isthmian League Premier Division	12	0	—		—		—		12	0
Carshalton Athletic	2007–08	Isthmian League Premier Division	24	1	0	0	—		3	0	27	1
Carshalton Athletic	Total		36	1	0	0	—		3	0	39	1
Harrow Borough	2008–09	Isthmian League Premier Division	29	1	0	0	—		2	0	31	1
Harrow Borough	2009–10	Isthmian League Premier Division	31	4	0	0	—		3 (Note: Appearances in FA Trophy)	0	34	4
Harrow Borough	2010–11	Isthmian League Premier Division	37	4	5	0	—		1	0	43	4
Harrow Borough	Total		97	9	5	0	—		6	0	108	9
St Albans City	2011–12	Southern League Premier Division	33	2	4	1	—		1 (Note: Appearance in Southern League Cup)	0	38	3
St Albans City	2012–13	Southern League Premier Division	18	0	3	0	—		2 (Note: 1 appearance in Southern League Cup, 1 appearance in Herts Senior Cup)	0	23	0
St Albans City	Total		51	2	7	1	—		3	0	61	3
Braintree Town	2012–13	Conference Premier	11	0	—		—		—		11	0
Metropolitan Police	2013–14	Isthmian League Premier Division	7	0	2	0	—		0	0	9	0
Tonbridge Angels	2013–14	Conference South	28	0	—		—		1	1	29	1
Wealdstone	2014–15	Conference South	27	0	0	0	—		6 (Note: 4 appearances in FA Trophy, 2 appearances in Middlesex Senior Cup)	0	33	0
Wealdstone	2015–16	National League South	6	0	0	0	—		0	0	6	0
Wealdstone	Total		33	0	0	0	—		6	0	39	0
Career total			265	12	14	0	1	0	21	1	301	14

== Honours ==
- Harrow Borough Players' Player of the Year: 2008–09
- Harrow Borough Supporters' Player of the Year: 2008–09
