= Luuk Balkestein =

Dutch retired football player

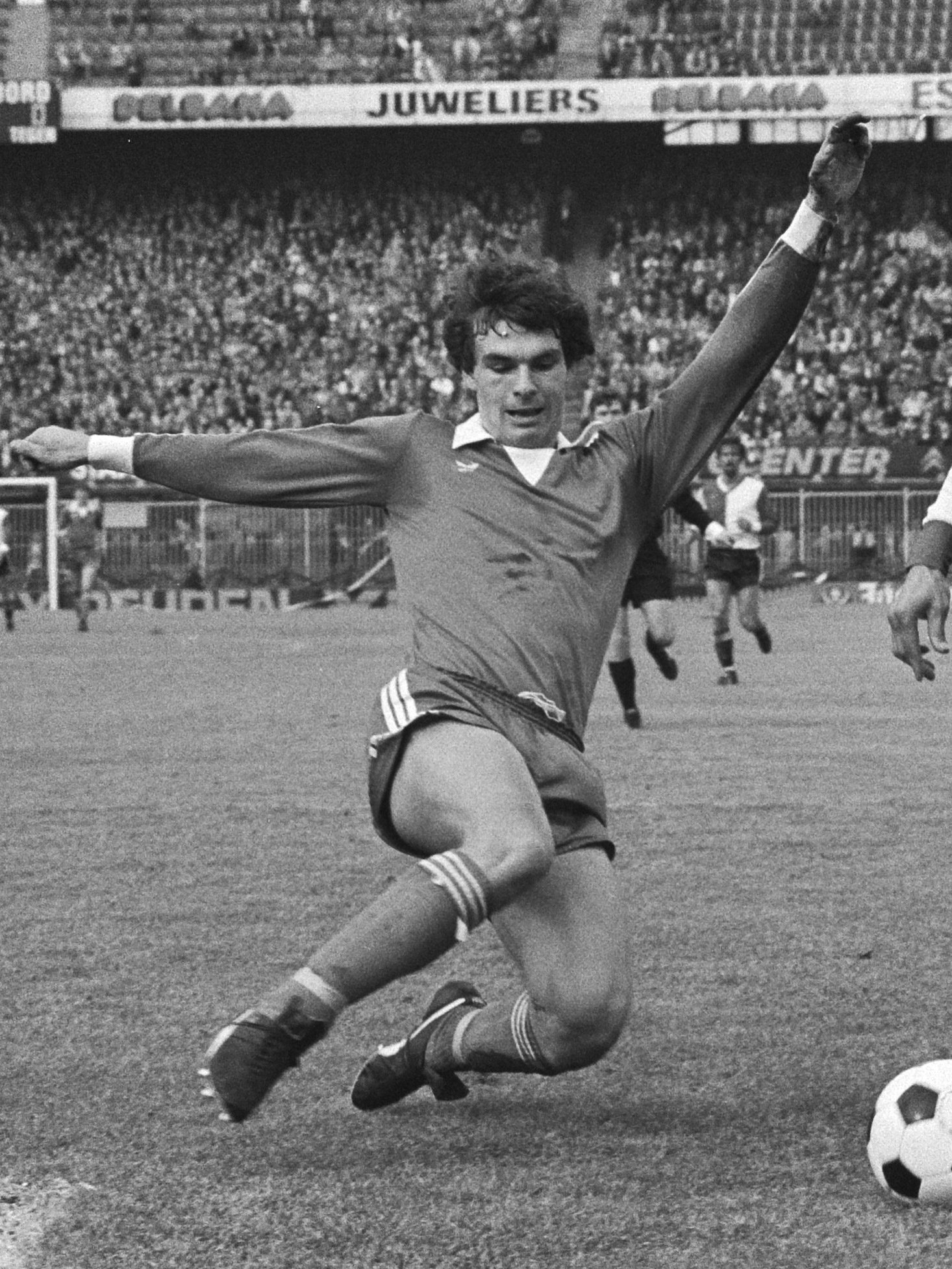
- Balkestein playing for Sparta in 1979

Personal information
- Date of birth: 9 April 1954 (age 72)
- Place of birth: Apeldoorn, Netherlands
- Position: Defender

Senior career*
Years	Team	Apps	(Gls)
1974–1980	Sparta	201	(7)
1980–1982	Feyenoord	18	(0)
Total		219	(7)

International career
1979–1980	Netherlands U21	3	(1)
1980	Netherlands	1	(0)
- * Club domestic league appearances and goals

Luuk Balkestein (born 9 April 1954) is a Dutch retired football player who played for Sparta Rotterdam and Feyenoord, as well as the Dutch national side.

== International career ==
Balkestein played three games for the Netherlands national under-21 football team. and earned one senior cap for the Netherlands, a friendly match against France in March 1980.

== Personal life ==
Balkestein was chief scout at German Bundesliga side Borussia Mönchengladbach until 2022 and had been working as a scout for Heerenveen from 1995 to 2001.

His son, Pim, was also a professional footballer.
