= 2002–03 Brentford F.C. season =

English football team season

Brentford F.C.
2002–03 season
- Chairman: Ron Noades (until March 2003); Eddie Rogers (from April 2003)
- Manager: Wally Downes
- Stadium: Griffin Park
- Second Division: 16th
- FA Cup: Fourth round
- League Cup: Second round
- Football League Trophy: Semi-finals
- Top goalscorer: League: Vine (10); All: Vine (13)
- Highest home attendance: 9,168
- Lowest home attendance: 3,990
- Average home league attendance: 5,759
Home colours	Away colours

During the 2002–03 English football season, Brentford competed in Football League Second Division. Despite an unbeaten start and topping the table, the club won just four of the final 21 matches of the season and slumped to a 16th-place finish.

== Season summary ==
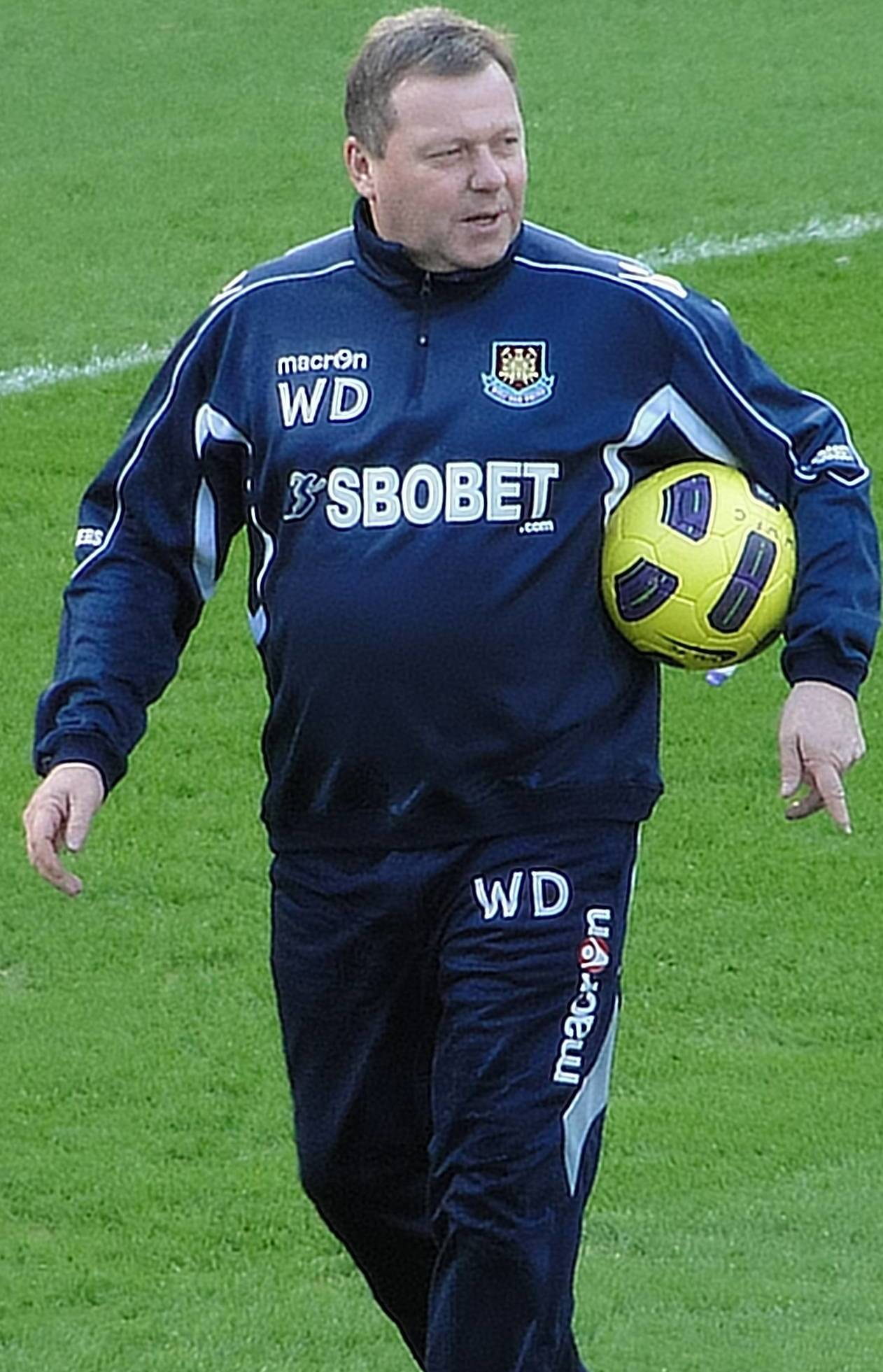
Previously assistant manager, Wally Downes was appointed Brentford manager in June 2002.

After defeat in the 2002 Second Division play-off final, the spine of the Brentford starting XI was broken up, with high earners Ívar Ingimarsson, Lloyd Owusu and captain Paul Evans released. Manager Steve Coppell resigned in June 2002 and was replaced by his assistant, Wally Downes. The squad was reinforced with free transfer and non-contract players. The loss of forwards Lloyd Owusu and the return of loanee Ben Burgess to Blackburn Rovers led to the loan signing of youngster Rowan Vine from Portsmouth and a chance for Mark McCammon as a first-choice. A number of youth products were also promoted to the first team squad.

Throughout the season, a need to balance the books in the wake of the ITV Digital collapse saw no transfer fees paid out and a reduction of the wage bill. The cash crisis heightened in the week leading up to the beginning of the season, when a deadline of 7 August 2002 was set, on which Griffin Park would be sold to developers George Wimpey or if the deal fell through, Brentford would be entered into administration. The deal hit a stumbling block, but administration was staved off by the £400,000 sale of central defender Darren Powell on the eve of the season. The financial state of affairs left Brentford £4 million in debt and led Managing Director Gary Hargreaves to state that the club would "have to sell the freehold of Griffin Park without any guarantee of a return to the borough in the near future". In September 2002, Richard Thompson's £7 million bid to buy the club was turned down by supporters' trust Bees United.

Despite the turmoil, rookie manager Downes had a dream start, going unbeaten for the first seven league matches of the season, topping the table and winning the Manager of the Month award. The rot set in mid-September, with the Bees losing five of six matches, which included heavy successive defeats to Peterborough United in the league and Middlesbrough in the League Cup. The team began to recover in mid-October, losing just four of the following 17 matches, including two wins in the Football League Trophy and three in the FA Cup, with First Division Derby County being beaten at Griffin Park in the FA Cup third round on 4 January 2003.

Brentford limped through the remainder of the season, winning just four and losing 13 of the remaining 24 matches of the season. The goalscoring problem was compounded by the release of Mark McCammon on deadline day in March. Absences due to injuries and international call-ups also mounted, with Martin Rowlands, Leo Roget, Jay Smith, Stephen Evans, Jamie Fullarton and Eddie Hutchinson all spending time on the treatment table. Also in March, Ron Noades resigned as chairman and director, citing that "the death of the transfer market has prevented us from covering our trading losses incurred at Griffin Park" and revealing that the wage bill would be slashed from £706,000 for the 2002–03 season to £476,000 for 2003–04. Eddie Rogers was appointed as chairman in April 2003. Brentford finished the season in 16th place.

== League table ==
Pos	Team	Pld	W	D	L	GF	GA	GD	Pts
14	Stockport County	46	15	10	21	65	70	−5	55
15	Notts County	46	13	16	17	62	70	−8	55
16	Brentford	46	14	12	20	47	56	−9	54
17	Port Vale	46	14	11	21	54	70	−16	53
18	Wycombe Wanderers	46	13	13	20	59	66	−7	52

Rules for classification: In the Football League goals scored (GF) takes precedence over goal difference (GD).

== Results ==
Brentford's goal tally listed first.

=== Legend ===
Win	Draw	Loss

=== Pre-season ===
Date	Opponent	Venue	Result	Attendance	Scorer(s)	Notes
13 July 2002	Aldershot Town	N	0–1	n/a		(Note: Match played as part of the inaugural Kingstonian Trophy at Kingsmeadow, Kingston upon Thames. Brentford lost the third place match to Darlington.)
14 July 2002	Darlington	N	0–1	n/a		
16 July 2002	Watford	H	1–0	1,595	Somner	
20 July 2002	Maidenhead United	A	2–0	n/a	Hutchinson, Peters	
23 July 2002	Crawley Town	A	6–0	604	Constantine (3, 1 pen), Dobson, O'Connor (pen), McCammon	
30 July 2002	Molesey	A	2–5	n/a	Diallo, Itonga	
31 July 2002	Ipswich Town	H	0–3	1,683		
3 August 2002	Millwall	A	1–2	n/a	Hunt	

=== Football League Second Division ===
No.	Date	Opponent	Venue	Result	Attendance	Scorer(s)
1	10 August 2002	Huddersfield Town	A	2–0	9,635	Fullarton, Vine
2	13 August 2002	Bristol City	H	1–0	7,130	Hunt (pen)
3	17 August 2002	Oldham Athletic	H	0–0	5,356	
4	24 August 2002	Colchester United	A	1–0	3,135	Hunt (pen)
5	26 August 2002	Swindon Town	H	3–1	6,299	Vine (2), McCammon
6	31 August 2002	Notts County	A	2–2	5,551	McCammon, Williams
7	7 September 2002	Luton Town	H	0–0	7,145	
8	14 September 2002	Tranmere Rovers	A	1–3	6,626	O'Connor
9	17 September 2002	Cardiff City	A	2–0	12,032	
10	21 September 2002	Wycombe Wanderers	H	1–0	6,172	Hunt (pen)
11	28 September 2002	Peterborough United	A	1–5	5,066	Vine
12	5 October 2002	Barnsley	H	1–2	5,394	McCammon
13	12 October 2002	Northampton Town	A	2–1	5,739	Sonko, Vine
14	19 October 2002	Port Vale	H	1–1	5,177	Hunt (pen)
15	26 October 2002	Stockport County	A	3–2	4,601	McCammon (2), Marshall
16	29 October 2002	Plymouth Argyle	H	0–0	6,431	
17	2 November 2002	Blackpool	H	5–0	5,888	Vine, Evans (2), Sonko (2)
18	9 November 2002	Crewe Alexandra	A	1–2	5,663	Sonko
19	23 November 2002	Wigan Athletic	H	0–1	5,454	
20	30 November 2002	Cheltenham Town	A	0–1	5,013	
21	14 December 2002	Chesterfield	H	2–1	5,151	Hunt, Vine
22	21 December 2002	Queens Park Rangers	A	1–1	15,559	O'Connor
23	26 December 2002	Swindon Town	A	1–2	6,045	Vine
24	28 December 2004	Mansfield Town	H	1–0	5,844	O'Connor
25	14 January 2003	Oldham Athletic	A	1–2	5,039	O'Connor
26	18 January 2003	Notts County	H	1–1	5,112	Vine
27	4 February 2003	Mansfield Town	A	0–0	3,735	
28	8 February 2003	Crewe Alexandra	H	1–2	5,424	Hunt
29	11 February 2003	Bristol City	A	0–0	9,084	
30	15 February 2003	Blackpool	A	0–1	6,203	
31	22 February 2003	Luton Town	A	1–0	6,940	Vine
32	25 February 2003	Huddersfield Town	H	1–0	4,366	McCammon
33	1 March 2003	Tranmere Rovers	H	1–2	5,396	Sonko
34	4 March 2003	Cardiff City	H	0–2	5,727	
35	8 March 2003	Wycombe Wanderers	A	0–4	5,930	
36	11 March 2003	Colchester United	H	1–1	3,990	McCammon
37	15 March 2003	Stockport County	H	1–2	4,790	Antoine-Curier
38	18 March 2003	Port Vale	A	0–1	3,241	
39	22 March 2003	Plymouth Argyle	A	0–3	6,835	
40	29 March 2003	Northampton Town	H	3–0	5,354	Somner, Rowlands, Hunt
41	5 April 2003	Cheltenham Town	H	2–2	5,011	Dobson, O'Connor
42	12 April 2003	Wigan Athletic	A	0–2	7,204	
43	19 April 2003	Queens Park Rangers	H	1–2	9,168	Peters
44	21 April 2003	Chesterfield	A	2–0	3,296	Antoine-Curier (2)
45	26 April 2003	Barnsley	A	0–1	9,065	
46	3 May 2003	Peterborough United	H	1–1	6,687	Evans

=== FA Cup ===
Round	Date	Opponent	Venue	Result	Attendance	Scorer(s)
R1	16 November 2002	Wycombe Wanderers	A	4–2	5,673	O'Connor, Somner, Vine (2)
R2	7 December 2002	York City	A	2–1	3,517	McCammon, Hunt
R3	4 January 2003	Derby County	H	1–0	8,709	Hunt
R4	25 January 2003	Burnley	H	0–3	9,563	

=== Football League Cup ===
Round	Date	Opponent	Venue	Result	Attendance	Scorer(s)
R1	10 September 2002	Bournemouth	A	3–3 (a.e.t.), won 4–2 on pens)	3,302	O'Connor (2 pens), Vine
R2	1 October 2002	Middlesbrough	H	1–4	7,558	Sonko

=== Football League Trophy ===
Round	Date	Opponent	Venue	Result	Attendance	Scorer(s)
SR2	12 November 2002	Plymouth Argyle	A	1–0	3,565	Hunt
SQF	10 December 2002	Kidderminster Harriers	H	2–1	1,541	Marshall, O'Connor
SSF	21 January 2003	Cambridge United	H	1–2 (a.e.t.)	2,878	McCammon

- Sources: Soccerbase, 11v11

== Playing squad ==
Players' ages are as of the opening day of the 2002–03 season.

No	Position	Name	Nationality	Date of birth (age)	Signed from	Signed in	Notes
Goalkeepers
13	GK	Paul Smith	(England)	17 December 1979 (aged 22)	Carshalton Athletic	2000	
22	GK	Alan Julian	(Northern Ireland)	11 March 1983 (aged 19)	Youth	2001	
33	GK	Barry Marchena	(England)	2 October 1984 (aged 17)	Youth	2002	
Defenders
2	DF	Michael Dobson (c)	(England)	9 April 1981 (aged 21)	Youth	1999	
6	DF	Scott Marshall	(Scotland)	1 May 1973 (aged 29)	Southampton	1999	
14	DF	Matt Somner	(Wales)	8 December 1982 (aged 19)	Youth	2001	
15	DF	Jay Lovett	(England)	22 January 1978 (aged 24)	Crawley Town	2000	Loaned to Hereford United and Gravesend & Northfleet
16	DF	Lee Fieldwick	(England)	1 January 1982 (aged 20)	Youth	2000	
21	DF	Danny Allen-Page	(England)	30 October 1983 (aged 18)	Youth	2002	
29	DF	Leo Roget	(England)	1 August 1977 (aged 25)	Stockport County	2002	
30	DF	Andy Frampton	(England)	3 September 1979 (aged 22)	Crystal Palace	2002	
31	DF	Ibrahima Sonko	(Senegal)	22 January 1981 (aged 21)	Grenoble Foot 38	2002	
Midfielders
4	MF	Jay Smith	(England)	29 December 1981 (aged 20)	Youth	2001	
7	MF	Stephen Evans	(Wales)	25 September 1980 (aged 21)	Crystal Palace	2002	
8	MF	Mark Williams	(England)	19 October 1981 (aged 20)	Youth	2000	
9	MF	Kevin O'Connor	(Republic of Ireland)	24 February 1982 (aged 20)	Youth	2000	
10	MF	Stephen Hunt	(Republic of Ireland)	1 August 1981 (aged 21)	Crystal Palace	2001	
11	MF	Martin Rowlands	(Republic of Ireland)	8 February 1979 (aged 23)	Farnborough Town	1998	
12	MF	Jay Tabb	(Republic of Ireland)	21 February 1984 (aged 18)	Crystal Palace	2000	Loaned to Crawley Town
18	MF	Eddie Hutchinson	(England)	12 February 1982 (aged 20)	Sutton United	2000	
20	MF	Rizwan Rehman	(England)	19 November 1982 (aged 19)	Youth	2002	
25	MF	Stephen Hughes	(England)	26 January 1984 (aged 18)	Youth	2002	
28	MF	Jamie Fullarton	(Scotland)	20 July 1974 (aged 28)	Dundee United	2002	
Forwards
19	FW	Mark Peters	(England)	4 October 1983 (aged 18)	Southampton	2002	
23	FW	Lloyd Blackman	(England)	24 September 1983 (aged 18)	Youth	2002	
24	FW	Bobby Traynor	(England)	1 November 1983 (aged 18)	Youth	2003	
26	FW	Leon Constantine	(England)	24 February 1978 (aged 24)	Millwall	2002	
27	FW	Rowan Vine	(England)	21 September 1982 (aged 19)	Portsmouth	2002	On loan from Portsmouth
34	FW	Mickaël Antoine-Curier	(France)	5 March 1983 (aged 19)	Nottingham Forest	2003	On loan from Nottingham Forest
Players who left the club mid-season
1	GK	Ólafur Gottskálksson	(Iceland)	12 March 1968 (aged 34)	Hibernian	2000	Retired
3	DF	Ijah Anderson	(England)	30 December 1975 (aged 26)	Southend United	1995	Loaned to Wycombe Wanderers and Bristol Rovers; Transferred to Bristol Rovers
17	FW	Mark McCammon	(Barbados)	7 August 1978 (aged 24)	Charlton Athletic	2000	Transferred to Millwall
32	DF	Ben Chorley	(England)	30 September 1982 (aged 19)	Arsenal	2002	Returned to Arsenal after loan

- Source: Soccerbase

== Coaching staff ==
Name	Role
(England) Wally Downes	Manager
(England) Garry Thompson	Assistant Manager
(England) Jim Stannard	First Team Coach
(England) Roberto Forzoni	Coach
(England) Phil McLoughlin	Physiotherapist
(England) Colin Martin	Medical Officer
(England) John Griffin	Chief Scout

== Statistics ==
=== Appearances and goals ===
Substitute appearances in brackets.

No	Pos	Nat	Name	League		FA Cup		League Cup		FL Trophy		Total	
No	Pos	Nat	Name	Apps	Goals	Apps	Goals	Apps	Goals	Apps	Goals	Apps	Goals
2	DF	(England)	Michael Dobson	45 (1)	1	4	0	2	0	2	0	53 (1)	0
3	DF	(England)	Ijah Anderson	9	0	0	0	2	0	0	0	11	0
4	MF	(England)	Jay Smith	24 (2)	0	2	0	0	0	2 (1)	0	28 (3)	0
6	DF	(Scotland)	Scott Marshall	23 (2)	1	4	0	1	0	3	1	31 (2)	2
7	MF	(Wales)	Stephen Evans	20 (3)	3	3	0	1 (1)	0	2	0	25 (4)	3
8	MF	(England)	Mark Williams	4 (18)	1	0 (1)	0	0 (1)	0	1	0	5 (20)	1
9	MF	(Republic of Ireland)	Kevin O'Connor	45 (1)	5	4	1	2	2	2	1	53 (1)	9
10	MF	(Republic of Ireland)	Stephen Hunt	42 (1)	7	4	2	1 (1)	0	2	1	49 (2)	10
11	MF	(Republic of Ireland)	Martin Rowlands	13 (5)	1	2	0	0	0	2	0	17 (5)	1
12	MF	(Republic of Ireland)	Jay Tabb	1 (4)	0	0 (1)	0	0	0	1 (1)	0	2 (6)	0
14	DF	(Wales)	Matt Somner	40 (1)	1	1 (2)	1	0 (1)	0	1	0	42 (4)	2
15	DF	(England)	Jay Lovett	1	0	0	0	0	0	0	0	1	0
16	DF	(England)	Lee Fieldwick	6 (1)	0	0	0	0	0	0	0	6 (1)	0
17	FW	(Barbados)	Mark McCammon	31 (5)	7	3	1	1	0	1	1	36 (5)	9
18	MF	(England)	Eddie Hutchinson	21 (2)	0	0	0	2	0	0 (1)	0	23 (3)	0
19	FW	(England)	Mark Peters	3 (8)	1	0 (1)	0	0	0	0	0	3 (9)	1
22	GK	(Northern Ireland)	Alan Julian	3	0	0	0	0	0	1	0	4	0
23	FW	(England)	Lloyd Blackman	1	0	0	0	0	0	0	0	1	0
24	FW	(England)	Bobby Traynor	0 (2)	0	0	0	0	0	0 (1)	0	0 (3)	0
25	MF	(England)	Stephen Hughes	2 (1)	0	1 (1)	0	0	0	0 (1)	0	3 (3)	0
26	FW	(England)	Leon Constantine	2 (15)	0	0	0	1 (1)	0	0	0	3 (16)	0
28	MF	(Scotland)	Jamie Fullarton	23 (5)	1	1	0	2	0	2	0	28 (5)	1
29	DF	(England)	Leo Roget	15	0	1	0	1	0	1	0	18	0
30	DF	(England)	Andy Frampton	9 (6)	0	3	0	—		3	0	15 (6)	0
31	DF	(Senegal)	Ibrahima Sonko	38	5	4	0	2	1	2	0	46	6
	Players loaned in during the season												
27	FW	(England)	Rowan Vine	38 (5)	10	3	2	1 (1)	1	3	0	45 (6)	13
32	DF	(England)	Ben Chorley	2	0	—		1	0	—		3	0
34	FW	(France)	Mickaël Antoine-Curier	11	3	—		—		—		11	3

- Players listed in italics left the club mid-season.
- Source: Soccerbase

=== Goalscorers ===
No	Pos	Nat	Player	FL2	FAC	FLC	FLT	Total
27	FW	(England)	Rowan Vine	10	2	1	0	13
10	MF	(Republic of Ireland)	Stephen Hunt	7	2	0	1	10
17	FW	(Barbados)	Mark McCammon	7	1	0	1	9
9	MF	(Republic of Ireland)	Kevin O'Connor	5	1	2	1	9
31	DF	(Senegal)	Ibrahima Sonko	5	0	1	0	6
34	FW	(France)	Mickaël Antoine-Curier	3	—	—	—	3
7	MF	(Wales)	Stephen Evans	3	0	0	0	3
6	MF	(Scotland)	Scott Marshall	1	0	0	1	2
14	DF	(Wales)	Matt Somner	1	1	0	0	2
2	DF	(England)	Michael Dobson	1	0	0	0	1
28	MF	(Scotland)	Jamie Fullarton	1	0	0	0	1
19	FW	(England)	Mark Peters	1	0	0	0	1
11	MF	(Republic of Ireland)	Martin Rowlands	1	0	0	0	1
7	MF	(England)	Mark Williams	1	0	0	0	1
Total				47	7	4	4	62

- Players listed in italics left the club mid-season.
- Source: Soccerbase

=== Discipline ===
No	Pos	Nat	Player	FL2		FAC		FLC		FLT		Total		Pts
No	Pos	Nat	Player	Yellow card	Red card	Yellow card	Red card	Yellow card	Red card	Yellow card	Red card	Yellow card	Red card	Pts
27	FW	(England)	Rowan Vine	9	1	0	0	1	0	0	0	10	1	13
28	MF	(Scotland)	Jamie Fullarton	5	2	0	0	1	0	0	0	6	2	12
7	MF	(Wales)	Stephen Evans	3	0	1	1	0	0	0	0	4	1	7
29	DF	(England)	Leo Roget	2	1	0	0	1	0	1	0	4	1	7
31	DF	(Senegal)	Ibrahima Sonko	6	0	0	0	0	0	0	0	6	0	6
30	DF	(England)	Andy Frampton	2	0	1	1	0	0	0	0	3	1	6
6	MF	(Scotland)	Scott Marshall	2	1	1	0	0	0	0	0	3	1	6
11	MF	(Republic of Ireland)	Martin Rowlands	5	0	0	0	0	0	0	0	5	0	5
10	MF	(Republic of Ireland)	Stephen Hunt	4	0	1	0	0	0	0	0	5	0	5
17	FW	(Barbados)	Mark McCammon	4	0	1	0	0	0	0	0	5	0	5
4	MF	(England)	Jay Smith	2	0	1	0	0	0	0	0	3	0	3
19	FW	(England)	Mark Peters	0	1	0	0	0	0	0	0	0	1	3
18	MF	(England)	Eddie Hutchinson	2	0	0	0	0	0	0	0	2	0	2
14	DF	(Wales)	Matt Somner	2	0	0	0	0	0	0	0	2	0	2
9	MF	(Republic of Ireland)	Kevin O'Connor	1	0	1	0	0	0	0	0	2	0	2
34	FW	(France)	Mickaël Antoine-Curier	1	0	—		—		—		1	0	1
12	MF	(Republic of Ireland)	Jay Tabb	1	0	0	0	0	0	0	0	1	0	1
2	DF	(England)	Michael Dobson	0	0	1	0	0	0	0	0	1	0	1
Total				51	6	7	2	3	0	1	0	62	8	86

- Players listed in italics left the club mid-season.
- Source: ESPN FC

=== Management ===
Name	Nat	From	To	Record All Comps					Record League				
Name	Nat	From	To	P	W	D	L	W %	P	W	D	L	W %
Wally Downes	(England)	10 August 2002	3 May 2003	55	19	13	23	34.55|	46	14	12	20	30.43

=== Summary ===
Games played	55 (46 Second Division, 4 FA Cup, 2 League Cup, 3 Football League Trophy)
Games won	19 (14 Second Division, 3 FA Cup, 0 League Cup, 2 Football League Trophy)
Games drawn	13 (12 Second Division, 0 FA Cup, 1 League Cup, 0 Football League Trophy)
Games lost	23 (20 Second Division, 1 FA Cup, 1 League Cup, 1 Football League Trophy)
Goals scored	62 (47 Second Division, 7 FA Cup, 4 League Cup, 4 Football League Trophy)
Goals conceded	72 (56 Second Division, 6 FA Cup, 7 League Cup, 3 Football League Trophy)
Clean sheets	17 (15 Second Division, 1 FA Cup, 0 League Cup, 1 Football League Trophy)
Biggest league win	5–0 versus Blackpool, 2 November 2002
Worst league defeat	4–0 versus Wycombe Wanderers, 8 March 2003; 5–1 versus Peterborough United, 28 September 2002
Most appearances	54, Michael Dobson & Kevin O'Connor (each 46 Second Division, 4 FA Cup, 2 League Cup, 2 Football League Trophy)
Top scorer (league)	10, Rowan Vine
Top scorer (all competitions)	13, Rowan Vine

== Transfers & loans ==
Players transferred in
Date	Pos.	Name	Previous club	Fee	Ref.
9 August 2002	FW	(England) Leon Constantine	(England) Millwall	Free	
9 August 2002	DF	(Scotland) Jamie Fullarton	(Scotland) Dundee United	Non-contract	
9 August 2002	DF	(England) Leo Roget	(England) Stockport County	Non-contract	
9 August 2002	DF	(Senegal) Ibrahima Sonko	(France) Grenoble Foot 38	Non-contract	
28 October 2002	DF	(England) Andy Frampton	(England) Crystal Palace	Free	
27 March 2003	FW	(Nigeria) Efan Ekoku	(England) Sheffield Wednesday	Non-contract	
Players loaned in
Date from	Pos.	Name	From	Date to	Ref.
8 August 2002	FW	(England) Rowan Vine	(England) Portsmouth	End of season	
14 August 2002	DF	(England) Ben Chorley	(England) Arsenal	4 October 2002	
10 March 2003	FW	(France) Mickaël Antoine-Curier	(England) Nottingham Forest	End of season	
Players transferred out
Date	Pos.	Name	Subsequent club	Fee	Ref.
9 August 2002	DF	(England) Darren Powell	(England) Crystal Palace	£400,000	
17 February 2003	DF	(England) Ijah Anderson	(England) Bristol Rovers	Free	
27 March 2003	MF	(Barbados) Mark McCammon	(England) Millwall	Free	
Players loaned out
Date from	Pos.	Name	To	Date to	Ref.
27 November 2002	DF	(England) Ijah Anderson	(England) Wycombe Wanderers	3 January 2003	
16 January 2003	DF	(England) Jay Lovett	(England) Hereford United	17 March 2003	
8 February 2003	DF	(England) Ijah Anderson	(England) Bristol Rovers	16 February 2003	
11 February 2003	MF	(England) Jay Tabb	(England) Crawley Town	End of season	
20 March 2003	MF	(England) Jay Lovett	(England) Gravesend & Northfleet	26 April 2003	
Players released
Date	Pos.	Name	Subsequent club	Join date	Ref.
15 November 2002	GK	(Iceland) Ólafur Gottskálksson	(Iceland) Grindavík	November 2002	
30 June 2003	FW	(England) Leon Constantine	(England) Southend United	21 August 2003	
30 June 2003	FW	(Nigeria) Efan Ekoku	(Republic of Ireland) Dublin City	August 2004	
30 June 2003	DF	(Scotland) Jamie Fullarton	(England) Southend United	22 July 2003	
30 June 2003	DF	(England) Jay Lovett	(England) Farnborough Town	1 July 2003	
30 June 2003	DF	(Scotland) Scott Marshall	(England) Wycombe Wanderers	26 November 2003	
30 June 2003	MF	(England) Rizwan Rehman	(England) Molesey	1 July 2003	
30 June 2003	MF	(England) Martin Rowlands	(England) Queens Park Rangers	31 July 2003	
30 June 2003	MF	(England) Mark Williams	(England) Barnet	1 July 2003	

== Kit ==
Supplier: TFG
Sponsor(s): GMB

Home	Away

Source: Brentford F.C.

== Awards ==
- Supporters' Player of the Year: Paul Smith
- Football League Second Division Manager of the Month: Wally Downes (August 2002)
