= 2003–04 Brentford F.C. season =

English football team season

Brentford
2003–04 season
- Chairman: Eddie Rogers
- Manager: Wally Downes (until 14 March 2004); Garry Thompson (14–18 March 2004); Martin Allen (from 18 March 2004)
- Stadium: Griffin Park
- Second Division: 17th
- FA Cup: Second round
- League Cup: First round
- Football League Trophy: Second round
- Top goalscorer: League: Hunt (11); All: Hunt (12)
- Highest home attendance: 9,485
- Lowest home attendance: 3,818
- Average home league attendance: 5,592
Home colours	Away colours

During the 2003–04 English football season, Brentford competed in Football League Second Division. After a mid-season spell of one win in 18 matches and relegation looking definite, manager Wally Downes was sacked in mid-March 2004. Martin Allen took over and pulled off "The Great Escape" to secure safety on the final day of the season.

== Season summary ==
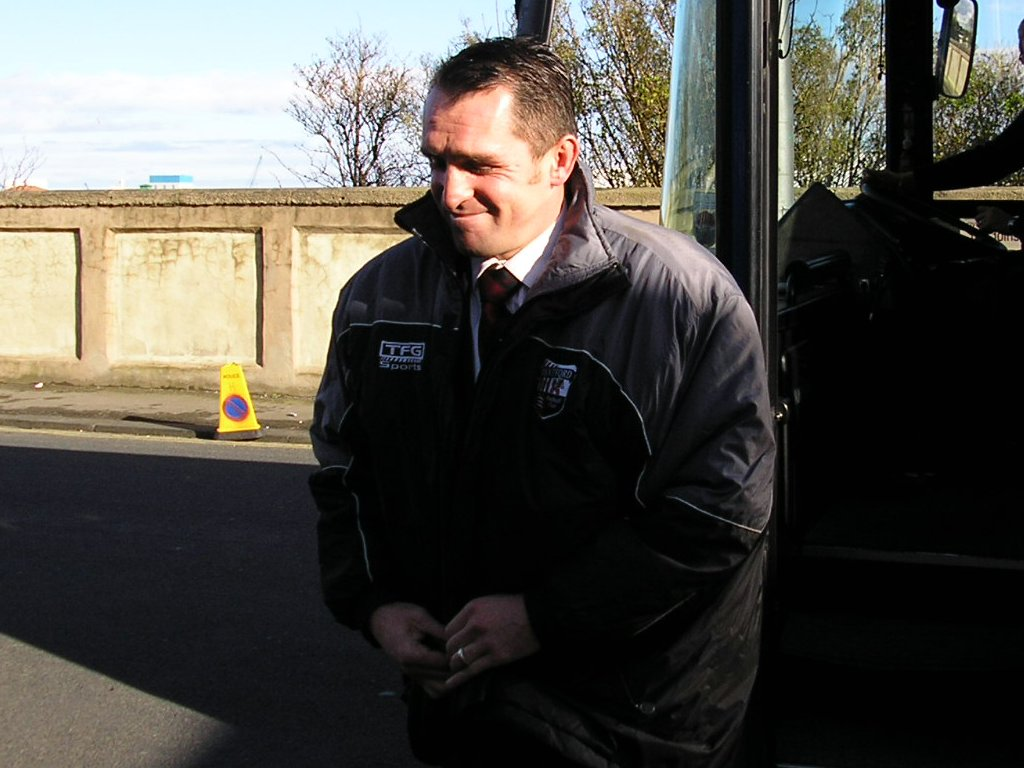
Martin Allen was appointed Brentford manager in March 2004 and preserved the club's Second Division status.

Cash-strapped Brentford began the 2003–04 season with a threadbare squad, depleted through injuries and propped up with youngsters, with manager Wally Downes admitting that the club's "immediate goal is keeping ourselves afloat for a period that shows the bank we can manage ourselves". Five defeats in the opening six games left the club second-from-bottom, before the integration of loanees Ben May, Tommy Wright and Joel Kitamirike yielded an improvement in form in September 2003, going unbeaten and winning three of five matches. In October, amidst speculation that former Brentford manager Steve Perryman would return to the club as director of football, manager Wally Downes was assured that his role would not be affected. Perryman eventually turned the offer down.

Despite a morale-boosting 7–1 FA Cup first round victory over Gainsborough Trinity and four wins from six matches in October and November lifting the Bees to mid-table, the rot soon set in. After the goalkeeping position weakened by the £500,000 sale of Paul Smith in January 2004 and with just one win from 19 matches in all competitions, Wally Downes was sacked after a 2–0 home defeat to Stockport County on 13 March 2004, which was Brentford's fifth consecutive defeat. Caretaker manager Garry Thompson took charge for the away match versus Blackpool on 16 March, with a 1–1 draw securing the first point won for a month.

Former Barnet manager Martin Allen took over on 18 March 2004 and was tasked with retaining Brentford's Second Division status. Allen released a number of players, installed his own backroom team and immediately galvanised the squad, winning three and drawing three of his first six matches to lift the Bees above the relegation places. A priceless point salvaged at already-relegated Wycombe Wanderers on 24 April kept the Bees above the relegation places. A 1–0 defeat away to fellow strugglers Grimsby Town in the penultimate match of the season left Brentford in 19th place, two places above the relegation zone. In order to secure safety on the final day, the club would need victory over Bournemouth or favourable results elsewhere. The match versus Bournemouth at Griffin Park remained scoreless until seven minutes from time, when substitute Alex Rhodes "coolly slotted" past Cherries' goalkeeper Neil Moss for a 1–0 win that completed Brentford's escape from relegation. The club ended the season in 17th place.

== League table ==
Pos	Team	Pld	W	D	L	GF	GA	GD	Pts
15	Oldham Athletic	46	12	21	13	66	60	+6	57
16	Sheffield Wednesday	46	13	14	19	48	64	−16	53
17	Brentford	46	14	11	21	52	69	−17	53
18	Peterborough United	46	12	16	18	58	58	0	52
19	Stockport County	46	11	19	16	62	70	−8	52

Rules for classification: In the Football League goals scored (GF) takes precedence over goal difference (GD).

== Results ==
Brentford's goal tally listed first.

=== Legend ===
Win	Draw	Loss

=== Pre-season ===
Date	Opponent	Venue	Result	Attendance	Scorer(s)
15 July 2003	Reading	H	3–2	n/a	Peters, Tabb, Blackman
19 July 2003	Yeovil Town	A	0–2	1,936	
22 July 2003	Exeter City	A	0–0	1,101	
26 July 2003	Dorchester Town	A	0–1	427	
29 July 2003	Staines Town	A	2–1	n/a	Somner, Peters
2 August 2003	Farnborough Town	A	3–1	550	Beadle, Peters (2, 1 pen)
5 August 2003	Portsmouth	H	0–1	3,080	

=== Football League Second Division ===
No.	Date	Opponent	Venue	Result	Attendance	Scorer(s)
1	9 August 2003	Tranmere Rovers	A	1–4	7,307	Hunt (pen)
2	16 August 2003	Peterborough United	H	0–3	4,463	
3	23 August 2003	Wrexham	A	0–1	4,048	
4	25 August 2003	Oldham Athletic	H	2–1	4,073	Hutchinson, Rougier
5	30 August 2003	Port Vale	A	0–1	5,257	
6	6 September 2003	Plymouth Argyle	H	1–3	5,688	May
7	13 September 2003	Rushden & Diamonds	A	1–0	4,396	Hunt
8	16 September 2003	Blackpool	H	0–0	3,818	
9	20 September 2003	Hartlepool United	H	2–1	4,501	Sonko, Wright
10	27 September 2003	Chesterfield	A	2–1	3,257	Hunt, Wright
11	30 September 2003	Colchester United	A	1–1	3,343	Rougier
12	4 October 2003	Sheffield Wednesday	H	0–3	8,631	
13	18 October 2003	Luton Town	H	4–2	5,579	Hunt, Tabb (2), May
14	21 October 2003	Brighton & Hove Albion	H	4–0	6,532	Hunt (2 pens), Tabb, May
15	25 October 2003	Notts County	A	0–2	4,145	
16	1 November 2003	Barnsley	H	2–1	4,789	Hutchinson, Rougier
17	11 November 2003	Queens Park Rangers	A	0–1	15,865	
18	15 November 2003	Wycombe Wanderers	A	2–1	6,445	Hutchinson, Tabb
19	22 November 2003	Grimsby Town	H	1–3	4,685	Hunt (pen)
20	29 November 2003	Bournemouth	A	0–1	6,674	
21	13 December 2003	Stockport County	A	1–1	4,081	Jackman (og)
22	20 December 2003	Swindon Town	H	0–2	5,077	
23	26 December 2003	Bristol City	H	1–2	5,912	May
24	28 December 2003	Plymouth Argyle	A	0–2	17,882	
25	3 January 2004	Oldham Athletic	A	1–1	4,990	May
26	10 January 2004	Tranmere Rovers	H	2–2	4,105	Hunt, May
27	17 January 2004	Peterborough United	A	0–0	4,658	
28	24 January 2004	Wrexham	H	0–1	4,567	Hunt
29	31 January 2004	Port Vale	H	3–2	4,306	Tabb, Hunt, Rougier
30	7 February 2004	Bristol City	A	1–3	13,029	Hutchinson
31	14 February 2004	Queens Park Rangers	H	1–1	8,418	O'Connor
32	21 February 2004	Luton Town	A	1–4	6,273	Wright
33	28 February 2004	Notts County	H	2–3	4,478	Evans, Hutchinson
34	2 March 2004	Brighton & Hove Albion	A	0–1	6,007	
35	6 March 2004	Swindon Town	A	1–2	7,649	May
36	13 March 2004	Stockport County	H	0–2	6,615	McCammon
37	16 March 2004	Blackpool	A	1–1	4,617	Hunt (pen)
38	20 March 2004	Rushden & Diamonds	H	3–2	4,616	Tabb, Hunt, Talbot
39	27 March 2004	Hartlepool United	A	2–1	5,206	Tabb, Dobson
40	3 April 2004	Chesterfield	H	1–1	4,962	Evans
41	10 April 2004	Sheffield Wednesday	A	1–1	20,004	Sonko
42	12 April 2004	Colchester United	H	3–2	5,017	Tabb, Sonko, Harrold
43	17 April 2004	Barnsley	A	2–0	9,824	Talbot, Tabb
44	24 April 2004	Wycombe Wanderers	H	1–1	7,145	Harrold
45	1 May 2004	Grimsby Town	A	0–1	6,856	
46	8 May 2004	Bournemouth	H	1–0	9,485	Rhodes

=== FA Cup ===
Round	Date	Opponent	Venue	Result	Attendance	Scorer(s)
R1	8 November 2003	Gainsborough Trinity	H	7–1	3,041	Harrold (3), Rougier, Purkiss (og), Frampton, O'Connor
R2	6 December 2003	Telford United	A	0–3	2,996	

=== Football League Cup ===
Round	Date	Opponent	Venue	Result	Attendance
R1	12 August 2003	West Bromwich Albion	A	0–4	10,440

=== Football League Trophy ===
Round	Date	Opponent	Venue	Result	Attendance	Scorer(s)
SR1	14 October 2003	Barnet	A	3–3 (a.e.t.), won 3–1 on pens)	1,248	Tabb (2), Hunt (pen)
SR2	4 November 2003	Peterborough United	A	2–3	1,821	Dobson, Hunt

- Sources: Soccerbase, 11v11

== Playing squad ==
Players' ages are as of the opening day of the 2003–04 season.

No	Position	Name	Nationality	Date of birth (age)	Signed from	Signed in	Notes
Goalkeepers
13	GK	Alan Julian	(Northern Ireland)	11 March 1983 (aged 20)	Youth	2001	
29	GK	Josh Lennie	(England)	26 March 1986 (aged 17)	Youth	1999	
32	GK	Stuart Nelson	(England)	17 September 1981 (aged 21)	Hucknall Town	2004	
Defenders
2	DF	Michael Dobson (c)	(England)	9 April 1981 (aged 22)	Youth	1999	
3	DF	Matt Somner	(Wales)	8 December 1982 (aged 20)	Youth	2001	
6	DF	Ibrahima Sonko	(Senegal)	22 January 1981 (aged 22)	Grenoble Foot 38	2002	
12	DF	Andy Frampton	(England)	3 September 1979 (aged 23)	Crystal Palace	2002	
16	DF	Lee Fieldwick	(England)	1 January 1982 (aged 21)	Youth	2000	Loaned to Swansea City
24	DF	Ronnie Bull	(England)	26 December 1980 (aged 22)	Millwall	2004	Loaned from Millwall before transferring permanently
27	DF	Joel Kitamirike	(England)	5 April 1984 (aged 19)	Chelsea	2003	On loan from Chelsea
28	DF	Dean Wells	(England)	25 May 1985 (aged 18)	Youth	2003	
33	DF	Scott Fitzgerald	(Republic of Ireland)	13 August 1969 (aged 33)	Colchester United	2004	On loan from Colchester United
Midfielders
4	MF	Jay Smith	(England)	29 December 1981 (aged 21)	Youth	2001	
5	MF	Stewart Talbot	(England)	14 June 1973 (aged 30)	Rotherham United	2004	
7	MF	Stephen Evans	(Wales)	25 September 1980 (aged 22)	Crystal Palace	2002	
8	MF	Jay Tabb	(Republic of Ireland)	21 February 1984 (aged 19)	Crystal Palace	2000	
9	MF	Kevin O'Connor	(Republic of Ireland)	24 February 1982 (aged 21)	Youth	2000	
10	MF	Stephen Hunt	(Republic of Ireland)	1 August 1981 (aged 22)	Crystal Palace	2001	
15	MF	Danny Thomas	(England)	16 June 1984 (aged 19)	Youth	2003	Loaned to Staines Town
17	MF	Eddie Hutchinson	(England)	12 February 1982 (aged 21)	Sutton United	2000	
20	MF	Stephen Hughes	(England)	26 January 1984 (aged 19)	Youth	2002	Loaned to Basingstoke Town
31	MF	Alex Rhodes	(England)	12 January 1982 (aged 21)	Newmarket Town	2003	
Forwards
14	FW	Matt Harrold	(England)	24 July 1984 (aged 19)	Harlow Town	2003	
18	FW	Ben May	(England)	10 March 1984 (aged 19)	Millwall	2003	On loan from Millwall
22	FW	Lloyd Blackman	(England)	24 September 1983 (aged 19)	Youth	2002	Loaned to Scarborough, Chelmsford City and Cambridge City
Players who left the club mid-season
1	GK	Paul Smith	(England)	17 December 1979 (aged 23)	Carshalton Athletic	2000	Transferred to Southampton
~~5~~	DF	Leo Roget	(England)	1 August 1977 (aged 26)	Stockport County	2002	Transferred to Rushden & Diamonds
11	FW	Mark Peters	(England)	4 October 1983 (aged 19)	Southampton	2002	Released
19	MF	Tommy Wright	(England)	28 September 1984 (aged 18)	Leicester City	2003	Returned to Leicester City after loan
21	DF	Danny Allen-Page	(England)	30 October 1983 (aged 19)	Youth	2002	Released
23	FW	Bobby Traynor	(England)	1 November 1983 (aged 19)	Youth	2003	Loaned to Chelmsford City and Crawley Town, released
~~24~~	FW	Peter Beadle	(England)	13 May 1972 (aged 31)	Bristol City	2003	Released
~~24~~	FW	Jide Olugbodi	(Nigeria)	29 November 1977 (aged 25)	Austria Lustenau	2003	Released
25	MF	Tony Rougier	(Trinidad and Tobago)	17 July 1971 (aged 32)	Reading	2003	Transferred to Bristol City
26	GK	Jim Stannard	(England)	6 October 1962 (aged 40)	Youth	2003	First team coach, non-contract
30	GK	Danny Naisbitt	(England)	25 November 1978 (aged 24)	Bishop Auckland	2003	Non-contract
~~32~~	GK	Jani Viander	(Finland)	18 August 1975 (aged 27)	Plymouth Argyle	2004	Non-contract

- Source: Soccerbase

== Coaching staff ==
=== Wally Downes (9 August 2003 – 14 March 2004) ===
Name	Role
(England) Wally Downes	Manager
(England) Garry Thompson	Assistant Manager
(England) Jim Stannard	First Team Coach
(England) John Griffin	Chief Scout
(England) Phil McLoughlin	Physiotherapist
(England) Colin Martin	Medical Officer

=== Garry Thompson (14 – 18 March 2004) ===
Name	Role
(England) Garry Thompson	Caretaker Manager
(England) Jim Stannard	First Team Coach
(England) John Griffin	Chief Scout
(England) Phil McLoughlin	Physiotherapist
(England) Colin Martin	Medical Officer

=== Martin Allen (18 March – 8 May 2004) ===
Name	Role
(England) Martin Allen	Manager
(England) Adrian Whitbread	First Team Coach
(England) Jim Stannard	Goalkeeping Coach
(England) John Griffin	Chief Scout
(England) Damien Doyle	Sports Therapist
(England) Matt Hirons	Physiotherapist
(England) Colin Martin	Medical Officer

== Statistics ==
=== Appearances and goals ===
Substitute appearances in brackets.

No	Pos	Nat	Name	League		FA Cup		League Cup		FL Trophy		Total	
No	Pos	Nat	Name	Apps	Goals	Apps	Goals	Apps	Goals	Apps	Goals	Apps	Goals
1	GK	(England)	Paul Smith	24	0	2	0	1	0	2	0	29	0
2	DF	(England)	Michael Dobson	42	1	1	0	1	0	2	0	46	1
3	DF	(Wales)	Matt Somner	30 (9)	0	2	0	1	0	1	0	34 (9)	0
4	MF	(England)	Jay Smith	12 (5)	0	2	0	1	0	1 (1)	0	16 (6)	0
~~5~~	DF	(England)	Leo Roget	15	0	0	0	0	0	1	0	16	0
5	MF	(England)	Stewart Talbot	15	2	—		—		—		15	2
6	DF	(Senegal)	Ibrahima Sonko	42 (1)	3	2	0	1	0	0	0	45 (1)	3
7	MF	(Wales)	Stephen Evans	14 (11)	2	0 (2)	0	0	0	2	0	16 (13)	2
8	MF	(Republic of Ireland)	Jay Tabb	22 (14)	9	2	0	1	0	1	2	26 (14)	11
9	FW	(Republic of Ireland)	Kevin O'Connor	36 (7)	1	2	1	1	0	1 (1)	0	40 (8)	2
10	MF	(Republic of Ireland)	Stephen Hunt	38 (2)	11	2	0	1	0	2	1	43 (2)	12
11	FW	(England)	Mark Peters	2 (7)	0	0 (1)	0	1	0	1	0	4 (8)	0
12	DF	(England)	Andy Frampton	10 (6)	0	1	1	1	0	2	0	14 (6)	1
13	GK	(Northern Ireland)	Alan Julian	13	0	0	0	0 (1)	0	0	0	13 (1)	0
14	FW	(England)	Matt Harrold	5 (8)	2	1	3	0	0	1	0	7 (8)	5
16	DF	(England)	Lee Fieldwick	4 (1)	0	0	0	0	0	0	0	4 (1)	0
17	MF	(England)	Eddie Hutchinson	36	5	1	0	1	0	0 (1)	0	38 (1)	5
20	MF	(England)	Stephen Hughes	1 (8)	0	0 (2)	0	0 (1)	0	0 (1)	0	1 (12)	0
21	DF	(England)	Danny Allen-Page	0	0	0	0	0	0	0 (1)	0	0 (1)	0
22	FW	(England)	Lloyd Blackman	0 (3)	0	—		0 (1)	0	—		0 (4)	0
~~24~~	FW	(England)	Peter Beadle	1	0	—		0	0	—		1	0
~~24~~	FW	(Nigeria)	Jide Olugbodi	0 (2)	0	0 (1)	0	—		1 (1)	0	1 (4)	0
25	MF	(Trinidad and Tobago)	Tony Rougier	29 (2)	4	2	1	0	0	1	0	32 (2)	5
28	DF	(England)	Dean Wells	0 (1)	0	0	0	0	0	0	0	0 (1)	0
31	MF	(England)	Alex Rhodes	0 (3)	1	—		—		—		0 (3)	1
32	GK	(England)	Stuart Nelson	9	0	—		—		—		9	0
	Players loaned in during the season												
18	FW	(England)	Ben May	38 (3)	7	1	0	—		1	0	40 (3)	7
19	MF	(England)	Tommy Wright	18 (7)	3	0	0	—		0	0	18 (7)	3
24	DF	(England)	Ronnie Bull	20	0	—		—		—		20	0
27	DF	(England)	Joel Kitamirike	21 (1)	0	1	0	—		2	0	24 (1)	0
33	DF	(Republic of Ireland)	Scott Fitzgerald	9	0	—		—		—		9	0

- Players listed in italics left the club mid-season.
- Source: Soccerbase

=== Goalscorers ===
No	Pos	Nat	Player	FL2	FAC	FLC	FLT	Total
10	MF	(Republic of Ireland)	Stephen Hunt	11	0	0	1	12
8	MF	(Republic of Ireland)	Jay Tabb	9	0	0	2	11
18	FW	(England)	Ben May	7	0	—	0	7
17	MF	(England)	Eddie Hutchinson	5	0	0	0	5
25	DF	(Trinidad and Tobago)	Tony Rougier	4	1	0	0	5
14	FW	(England)	Matt Harrold	2	3	0	0	5
19	MF	(England)	Tommy Wright	3	0	—	0	3
6	DF	(Senegal)	Ibrahima Sonko	3	0	0	0	3
5	MF	(England)	Stewart Talbot	2	—	—	—	2
7	MF	(Wales)	Stephen Evans	2	0	0	0	2
9	MF	(Republic of Ireland)	Kevin O'Connor	1	1	0	0	2
31	MF	(England)	Alex Rhodes	1	—	—	—	1
2	DF	(England)	Michael Dobson	1	0	0	0	1
12	DF	(England)	Andy Frampton	0	1	0	0	1
Opponents				1	1	0	0	2
Total				52	6	0	3	61

- Players listed in italics left the club mid-season.
- Source: Soccerbase

=== Discipline ===
No	Pos	Nat	Player	FL2		FAC		FLC		FLT		Total		Pts
No	Pos	Nat	Player	Yellow card	Red card	Yellow card	Red card	Yellow card	Red card	Yellow card	Red card	Yellow card	Red card	Pts
18	FW	(England)	Ben May	7	0	0	0	0	0	0	1	7	1	10
~~5~~	DF	(England)	Leo Roget	2	2	0	0	0	0	1	0	3	2	9
10	MF	(Republic of Ireland)	Stephen Hunt	7	0	1	0	0	0	0	0	8	0	8
7	MF	(Wales)	Stephen Evans	4	1	1	0	0	0	0	0	5	1	8
19	MF	(England)	Tommy Wright	4	1	0	0	—		0	0	4	1	7
27	DF	(England)	Joel Kitamirike	3	1	0	0	—		1	0	4	1	7
3	DF	(Wales)	Matt Somner	6	0	0	0	0	0	0	0	6	0	6
24	DF	(England)	Ronnie Bull	3	1	—		—		—		3	1	6
9	MF	(Republic of Ireland)	Kevin O'Connor	4	0	1	0	0	0	0	0	5	0	5
6	DF	(Senegal)	Ibrahima Sonko	1	0	1	1	0	0	0	0	2	1	5
25	DF	(Trinidad and Tobago)	Tony Rougier	4	0	0	0	0	0	0	0	4	0	4
1	GK	(England)	Paul Smith	1	0	0	0	0	1	0	0	1	1	4
2	DF	(England)	Michael Dobson	3	0	0	0	0	0	0	0	3	0	3
17	MF	(England)	Eddie Hutchinson	2	0	0	0	0	0	1	0	3	0	3
~~24~~	FW	(England)	Peter Beadle	0	1	—		0	0	—		0	1	3
32	GK	(England)	Stuart Nelson	0	1	—		—		—		0	1	3
5	MF	(England)	Stewart Talbot	2	0	—		—		—		2	0	2
16	DF	(England)	Lee Fieldwick	2	0	0	0	0	0	0	0	2	0	2
12	DF	(England)	Andy Frampton	2	0	0	0	0	0	0	0	2	0	2
13	GK	(Northern Ireland)	Alan Julian	2	0	0	0	0	0	0	0	2	0	2
4	MF	(England)	Jay Smith	2	0	0	0	0	0	0	0	2	0	2
8	MF	(Republic of Ireland)	Jay Tabb	0	0	1	0	0	0	1	0	2	0	2
33	DF	(Republic of Ireland)	Scott Fitzgerald	1	0	—		—		—		1	0	1
20	MF	(England)	Stephen Hughes	1	0	0	0	0	0	0	0	1	0	1
11	FW	(England)	Mark Peters	1	0	0	0	0	0	0	0	1	0	1
Total				64	8	5	1	0	1	4	1	73	11	106

- Players listed in italics left the club mid-season.
- Source: ESPN FC

=== Management ===
Name	Nat	From	To	Record All Comps					Record League				
Name	Nat	From	To	P	W	D	L	W %	P	W	D	L	W %
Wally Downes	(England)	9 August 2003	14 March 2004	41	10	8	23	24.39|	36	9	7	20	25.00
Garry Thompson (caretaker)	(England)	14 March 2004	18 March 2004	1	0	1	0	0.00|	1	0	1	0	0.00
Martin Allen	(England)	18 March 2004	8 May 2004	9	5	3	1	55.56|	9	5	3	1	55.56

=== Summary ===
Games played	51 (46 Second Division, 2 FA Cup, 1 League Cup, 2 Football League Trophy)
Games won	15 (14 Second Division, 1 FA Cup, 0 League Cup, 0 Football League Trophy)
Games drawn	12 (11 Second Division, 0 FA Cup, 0 League Cup, 1 Football League Trophy)
Games lost	24 (21 Second Division, 1 FA Cup, 1 League Cup, 1 Football League Trophy)
Goals scored	64 (52 Second Division, 7 FA Cup, 0 League Cup, 5 Football League Trophy)
Goals conceded	83 (69 Second Division, 4 FA Cup, 4 League Cup, 6 Football League Trophy)
Clean sheets	6 (6 Second Division, 0 FA Cup, 0 League Cup, 0 Football League Trophy)
Biggest league win	5–0 versus Brighton & Hove Albion, 21 October 2003
Worst league defeat	3–0 on two occasions, 4–1 on two occasions
Most appearances	48, Kevin O'Connor (43 Second Division, 2 FA Cup, 1 League Cup, 2 Football League Trophy)
Top scorer (league)	11, Stephen Hunt
Top scorer (all competitions)	12, Stephen Hunt

== Transfers & loans ==
Players transferred in
Date	Pos.	Name	Previous club	Fee	Ref.
23 July 2003	FW	(England) Matt Harrold	(England) Harlow Town	Undisclosed	
7 August 2003	FW	(England) Peter Beadle	Unattached	Free	
15 August 2003	MF	(Trinidad and Tobago) Tony Rougier	(England) Reading	Free	
29 August 2003	GK	(England) Jim Stannard	Unattached	Non-contract	
3 October 2003	FW	(Nigeria) Jide Olugbodi	Unattached	Free	
31 October 2003	GK	(England) Danny Naisbitt	(England) Bishop Auckland	Non-contract	
11 November 2003	MF	(England) Alex Rhodes	(England) Newmarket Town	£7,500	
9 January 2004	GK	(Finland) Jani Viander	(England) Plymouth Argyle	Non-contract	
3 February 2004	GK	(England) Stuart Nelson	(England) Hucknall Town	£10,000	
17 February 2004	MF	(England) Stewart Talbot	(England) Rotherham United	Free	
7 April 2004	MF	(England) Ronnie Bull	(England) Millwall	Free	
Players loaned in
Date from	Pos.	Name	From	Date to	Ref.
25 August 2003	FW	(England) Ben May	(England) Millwall	End of season	
12 September 2003	MF	(England) Tommy Wright	(England) Leicester City	21 November 2003	
19 September 2003	DF	(England) Joel Kitamirike	(England) Chelsea	End of season	
10 December 2003	MF	(England) Tommy Wright	(England) Leicester City	13 April 2004	
7 January 2004	DF	(England) Ronnie Bull	(England) Millwall	7 April 2004	
16 March 2004	DF	(Republic of Ireland) Scott Fitzgerald	(England) Colchester United	End of season	
Players transferred out
Date	Pos.	Name	Subsequent club	Fee	Ref.
28 January 2004	GK	(England) Paul Smith	(England) Southampton	£500,000	
30 January 2004	DF	(England) Leo Roget	(England) Rushden & Diamonds	Free	
25 March 2004	MF	(Trinidad and Tobago) Tony Rougier	(England) Bristol City	Free	
Players loaned out
Date from	Pos.	Name	To	Date to	Ref.
19 September 2003	FW	(England) Lloyd Blackman	(England) Scarborough	18 October 2003	
31 October 2003	FW	(England) Lloyd Blackman	(England) Chelmsford City	23 December 2003	
31 October 2003	FW	(England) Bobby Traynor	(England) Chelmsford City	23 December 2003	
31 January 2004	FW	(England) Bobby Traynor	(England) Crawley Town	30 March 2004	
5 March 2004	MF	(England) Danny Thomas	(England) Staines Town	End of season	
25 March 2004	FW	(England) Lloyd Blackman	(England) Cambridge City	End of season	
25 March 2004	DF	(England) Lee Fieldwick	(Wales) Swansea City	End of season	
31 March 2004	MF	(England) Stephen Hughes	(England) Basingstoke Town	End of season	
Players released
Date	Pos.	Name	Subsequent club	Join date	Ref.
10 September 2003	FW	(England) Peter Beadle	(England) Barnet	10 September 2003	
24 November 2003	GK	(England) Danny Naisbitt	(England) Cambridge City	21 November 2003	
9 December 2003	FW	(Nigeria) Jide Olugbodi	Retired		
30 January 2004	GK	(Finland) Jani Viander	(Israel) SC Ashdod	February 2004	
14 March 2004	GK	(England) Jim Stannard	Retired		
24 March 2004	DF	(England) Danny Allen-Page	(England) Farnborough Town	25 March 2004	
24 March 2004	FW	(England) Mark Peters	(England) Farnborough Town	25 March 2004	
2 April 2004	MF	(England) Bobby Traynor	(England) Crawley Town	2 April 2004	
30 June 2004	FW	(England) Lloyd Blackman	(England) Farnborough Town	13 August 2004	
30 June 2004	DF	(England) Ronnie Bull	(England) Grimsby Town	16 July 2004	
30 June 2004	MF	(Wales) Stephen Evans	(England) Woking	5 August 2004	
30 June 2004	DF	(England) Lee Fieldwick	(England) Lewes	13 August 2004	
30 June 2004	MF	(England) Stephen Hughes	(England) Welling United	13 August 2004	
30 June 2004	GK	(England) Barry Marchena	(England) Kingstonian	1 July 2004	
30 June 2004	MF	(England) Danny Thomas	(England) Staines Town	1 July 2004	
30 June 2004	DF	(England) Dean Wells	(England) Hampton & Richmond Borough	10 August 2004	

== Kit ==
Supplier: TFG
Sponsor(s): St. George

Home	Away

Source: Brentford F.C.

== Awards ==
- Supporters' Player of the Year: Jay Tabb
