= Jide =

Jide is a Nigerian and Chinese given name that may refer to

- Jide Abasiri (born 2006), American football player
- Jide Kosoko (born 1954), Nigerian actor
- Jide Obi (born 1962), Nigerian musician
- Jide Olugbodi (born 1977), Nigerian footballer
- Jide Omokore, Nigerian businessman
- Jide Orire (born 1963), Nigerian Pentecostal bishop
- Wu Jide (born 1955), Chinese politician

== See also ==
- Remix OS
