= Lloyd Blackman =

Lloyd Blackman may refer to:

- Lloyd Blackman (footballer)
- Lloyd Blackman (musician)
