= Jay Tabb =

English-Irish footballer (born 1984)

Personal information
- Full name: Jay Anthony Tabb
- Date of birth: 21 February 1984 (age 42)
- Place of birth: Tooting, Greater London, England
- Height: 5 ft 5 in (1.65 m)
- Position: Midfielder

Youth career
- 1999–2000: Crystal Palace

Senior career*
Years	Team	Apps	(Gls)
2000–2006	Brentford	128	(20)
2003	→ Crawley Town (loan)	0	(0)
2006–2009	Coventry City	95	(11)
2009–2013	Reading	89	(0)
2013	→ Ipswich Town (loan)	9	(1)
2013–2016	Ipswich Town	76	(3)
Total		397	(35)

International career
2004–2006	Republic of Ireland U21	10	(1)
- * Club domestic league appearances and goals

Jay Anthony Tabb (born 21 February 1984) is a retired professional footballer. He began his career at Crystal Palace but was released as a junior and joined Brentford in 2000. He moved to Crawley Town in 2003 on a loan which was ultimately cut short by injury. He played in both of Brentford's unsuccessful play-off campaigns in 2005 and 2006, making over 150 appearances for the club in total.

Tabb moved to Coventry City in June 2006 and spent two and a half years at the club, picking up the Player of the Season Award for his performances during the 2007–08 season. In January 2009 he joined Reading. In 2012, he achieved the first promotion of his career as part of the 2011–12 Championship winning squad. He joined Ipswich Town on loan in March 2013 before making the move permanent three months later. He is primarily a central midfielder but has also played as full back, on both wings and as centre forward. In February 2015 Tabb won the "Dan Bartram Player of the Month" award, which included pre-match a trophy presentation at Portman Road.

Born in England to Irish parents, he is a dual citizen who has represented the Republic of Ireland at international level and won ten caps for the under-21 side between 2004 and 2006. He received his first call up to the senior team in 2006 but has yet to make an appearance.

== Club career ==
=== Brentford ===
Tabb was born in Tooting, Greater London and was released from Crystal Palace as a junior at the age of 16, after being deemed, at 5'5", too short to play professional football. Undeterred, he signed for Brentford. He attended Wimbledon College from 1997 to 2000, leaving to pursue a football career. Tabb made his Brentford debut on 3 May 2001 in a 2–2 draw against Luton Town but made only five appearances in his first two seasons at the club.

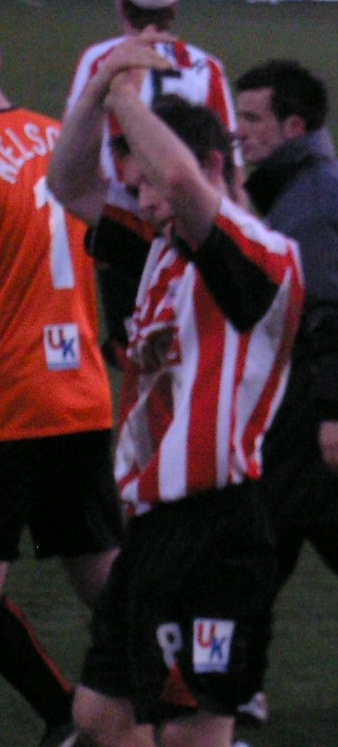
Tabb applauding the Brentford supporters in February 2005

Tabb struggled with injuries during the 2002–03 season and again made only a handful of appearances for Brentford that year. Tabb travelled to Crawley Town (then playing in the Southern League Premier Division) in February 2004 intent on signing loan forms, but ultimately did not agree to terms after suffering torn ligaments in training with Brentford a few days later. He did not appear again for Brentford until 19 April, starting in a 2–1 defeat to Queens Park Rangers and made just two starts during the entire campaign. Despite his injury hit season Brentford took up their option to extend Tabb's contract by a year in May 2003 with manager Wally Downes confident he would break into the first team the following season.

Tabb played a major role in the 2003–04 season contributing 11 goals in 40 appearances making him the club's second top scorer. His strong performances saw him sign a new deal in October 2003 keeping him at Brentford until 2005 with the option of a further one-year extension beyond that. He continued his good form into the start of the next season and began attracting interest from higher division clubs with Brentford admitting they would not stand in Tabb's way if they received an offer that was too good to refuse. He remained at the club though and in March 2005 extended his contract until the end of the 2005–06 season.

Tabb's last appearances for Brentford were in the 2005–06 League One play-off semi final defeat to Swansea City. He scored in the first leg draw at the Liberty Stadium but a 2–0 defeat in the return leg ended their promotion hopes. With Tabb wanting to leave the club in pursuit of football at a higher level he was placed on the transfer list on 18 May. Tabb left Brentford on the expiration of his contract and made 114 starts for Brentford, appearing 42 times from the bench and scoring 24 goals.

=== Coventry City ===
On 30 June 2006, Tabb signed for Coventry City, for an undisclosed fee on a three-year contract. He wore number 21 for Coventry and made his debut as a substitute against Cardiff City on 12 August, coming on for the injured Adam Virgo who himself was a substitute. On 23 April 2008, Tabb was awarded the Player of the Year accolade for his services to Coventry City during the 2007–08 season.

=== Reading ===
On 19 January 2009, Tabb signed for Reading, who were, at the time, managed by his former boss Steve Coppell. The transfer fee was undisclosed and Tabb was given the squad number 37 by Reading. Manager Steve Coppell said, "He is a player I know well, and I am certain he will supplement our squad as we go into this final third of the season." He made his Reading debut as a second-half substitute in the 1–0 defeat to Nottingham Forest on 28 February 2009 but only featured sporadically in his first few months at the club.

Tabb put together a run of appearances at the end of the season though and started in both legs of the play-off semi-final defeat to Burnley. He made his first Premier League appearance in Reading's 2–2 draw away at Swansea City on 6 October 2012 and earned plaudits for his no-nonsense performances in subsequent games.

Despite featuring regularly during the first half of the season, Tabb was told in January he was free to leave the club during the transfer window after Reading signed Daniel Carriço and Hope Akpan. No move materialised and he remained in the club's 25-man squad for the second half of their Premier League campaign.

=== Ipswich Town ===
Having not featured in the Reading team since early January, Tabb joined Ipswich Town on a one-month loan on 7 March. He made his debut two days later in a 0–0 draw with Peterborough United and was selected in the Championship Team of the Week after his performance in the 1–0 win over Bolton Wanderers the following weekend. After two impressive performances for Ipswich, Tabb expressed a hope that his good form could earn him a new contract at Reading, despite being surplus to requirements under the previous management. On 4 April his loan was extended for the rest of the season after which he returned to Reading before being released on 24 May.

On 5 June 2013, Tabb joined Ipswich Town on a permanent basis, signing a two-year contract effective from 1 July. He made his debut against his former club Reading on 3 August and scored the opener in a 2–1 defeat. The diminutive midfielder featured regularly in the 2014–15 season as Town reached the play-Offs. He scored twice, one a rare headed goal at home to promotion rivals Middlesbrough and a scrappy winner in a crucial game at home to Bolton Wanderers. His opportunities were more scarce in the 2015–16 season despite scoring in a 2–1 victory over Stevenage in the League Cup.

== International career ==
Despite being born in England, Tabb also holds an Irish passport and has represented the Republic of Ireland at international level. He was first called up to the under–21 squad on 18 May 2004 to face Scotland and made his debut in the match, helping Ireland to a 3–1 win. Tabb scored his first and only international goal in his next appearance for the under–21s, a 3–2 win over Bulgaria on 17 August 2004, and was a regular in the squad for the next two years. His final appearance came as a second-half substitute in a 3–0 win over Azerbaijan on 18 May 2006 and he ended his under–21 career with ten caps and one goal.

The day after the win over Azerbaijan, Tabb was called up to the senior squad for the first time for the match against Chile though he did not make an appearance. He received another call up for the Euro 2008 qualifier against Cyprus but again failed to make it off the bench and never made his full international debut.

== Rugby Union career ==
Tabb joined Rugby Union side Old Wimbledonians in 2017.

== Horse racing career ==
On 13 March 2020, Tabb was interviewed during ITV Racing's coverage of the Cheltenham Festival when leading up one of Philip Hobbs' horses where he now works as a stable lad.

In October 2021, it was reported that Tabb would ride at the Fitzdares Racing Welfare Charity Flat Race at Wincanton Racecourse. He finished sixth on the Hobbs-trained Umndeni and described the occasion as the 'best feeling ever'.

== Career statistics ==
Appearances and goals by club, season and competition
Club	Season	League			FA Cup		League Cup		Other		Total	
Club	Season	Division	Apps	Goals	Apps	Goals	Apps	Goals	Apps	Goals	Apps	Goals
Brentford	2000–01	Second Division	2	0	0	0	0	0	0	0	2	0
Brentford	2001–02	Second Division	3	0	0	0	0	0	0	0	3	0
Brentford	2002–03	Second Division	5	0	1	0	0	0	2 (Note: Appearance(s) in the EFL Trophy)	0	8	0
Brentford	2003–04	Second Division	36	9	2	0	1	0	1	2	40	11
Brentford	2004–05	League One	40	5	9	1	1	0	3 (Note: One appearance in the Football League Trophy and two appearances in the League One play-offs)	0	53	6
Brentford	2005–06	League One	42	6	5	0	1	0	2 (Note: Appearances in the League One play-offs)	1	50	7
Brentford	Total		128	20	17	1	3	0	8	3	156	24
Coventry City	2006–07	Championship	31	3	1	0	0	0	—		32	3
Coventry City	2007–08	Championship	42	5	3	0	4	1	—		49	6
Coventry City	2008–09	Championship	22	3	0	0	1	0	—		23	3
Coventry City	Total		95	11	4	0	5	1	—		104	12
Reading	2008–09	Championship	9	0	0	0	0	0	2 (Note: Appearance(s) in the Championship play-offs)	0	11	0
Reading	2009–10	Championship	28	0	3	0	1	0	—		32	0
Reading	2010–11	Championship	21	0	2	0	1	0	1	0	25	0
Reading	2011–12	Championship	19	0	1	0	1	0	—		21	0
Reading	2012–13	Premier League	12	0	1	0	3	0	—		16	0
Reading	Total		89	0	7	0	6	0	3	0	105	0
Ipswich Town (loan)	2012–13	Championship	9	1	0	0	0	0	—		9	1
Ipswich Town	2013–14	Championship	27	1	1	0	2	0	—		30	1
Ipswich Town	2014–15	Championship	40	2	0	0	0	0	2	0	42	2
Ipswich Town	2015–16	Championship	0	0	1	0	3	1	—		4	1
Ipswich Town	Total		76	4	2	0	5	1	2	0	85	5
Career total			388	35	30	1	19	2	13	3	450	41

== Honours ==
Reading

- Football League Championship: 2011–12

Individual

- Brentford Player of the Year: 2003–04
- Coventry City Player of the Year: 2007–08
