= Mark Peters (footballer, born 1983) =

English footballer

Personal information
- Full name: Mark William Peters
- Date of birth: 4 October 1983 (age 43)
- Place of birth: Frimley, England
- Height: 1.73 m (5 ft 8 in)
- Position: Forward

Youth career
- –2002: Southampton

Senior career*
| Years | Team | Apps | (Gls) |
| 2002–2004 | Brentford | 20 | (1) |
| 2004 | Farnborough Town | 3 | (0) |
| 2004 | Frimley Green | 5 | (3) |
| 2004 | Hornchurch | 0 | (0) |
| 2004–2005 | Frimley Green | 7 | (8) |
| 2005 | Carshalton Athletic | 10 | (1) |
| 2005 | Basingstoke Town | 10 | (6) |
| 2005 | Eastleigh | 4 | (1) |
| 2005–2006 | AFC Wimbledon | 4 | (0) |
| 2006 | Frimley Green | 12 | (14) |
| 2006 | Basingstoke Town | 5 | (2) |
| 2006 | → Gosport Borough (dual-registration) | 4 | (4) |
| 2007 | Uxbridge | | |
| 2007 | Walton & Hersham | 11 | (5) |
| 2007–2009 | Frimley Green | 43 | (23) |
| 2009–2012 | Badshot Lea | 70 | (20) |
| Total | | 208 | (88) |

International career
| 2006 | England C | 1 | (0) |
- * Club domestic league appearances and goals

Mark William Peters (born 4 October 1983) is an English retired footballer who played as a forward. He began his career as a youth at Southampton, before transferring to Brentford, where he made appearances in the Football League. Following his departure in 2004, Peters embarked on a nomadic career in non-League football. He was capped by England C at international level in 2006.

== Playing career ==
=== Southampton ===
Peters began his career with Premier League club Southampton at the age of 11 and signed his first professional contract in October 2000. He scored 32 goals for the youth team during the 2000–01 season. Despite earning comparisons to Alan Shearer, Peters never made an appearance for the first team and a broken ankle suffered in 2001 hindered his progress. Peters departed the club in February 2002.

=== Brentford ===
Peters joined Second Division promotion challengers Brentford in February 2002 and signed a 2 1/2-year contract. He was not picked for the first team under Steve Coppell during the 2001–02 season and instead played for the reserves. Peters made his professional debut when he came on as a substitute for Mark McCammon after 77 minutes of a 1–1 draw with Port Vale on 19 October 2022. He christened his maiden start for the club with his first goal, in a 2–1 West London derby defeat versus Queens Park Rangers on 19 April 2003. Peters finished the 2002–03 season having made 12 appearances and scored one goal.

Peters had a transfer request granted in October 2003, after expressing frustration at his lack of first team opportunities and the non-materialisation of a loan move to Conference club Aldershot Town one month earlier. After the sacking of Wally Downes and the arrival of new manager Martin Allen, Peters was released in March 2004. He made only 12 first team appearances during the 2003–04 season, though he was the top scorer for the reserve team. During his two years with the Bees, Peters made 24 appearances and scored one goal.

=== Non-League football ===
Peters transferred to Conference club Farnborough Town in March 2004. He made just three appearances for the club. Peters began the 2004–05 season with hometown Combined Counties League Premier Division club Frimley Green, for whom he scored six goals in seven games before, following a trial with Woking, he joined Conference South club Hornchurch on 8 November 2004. After making just one appearance, Peters returned to Frimley Green in mid-November 2004 and made seven appearances, scoring eight goals, before finishing the 2004–05 season with Carshalton Athletic, for whom he made 10 appearances and scored one goal.

Peters joined Conference South club Basingstoke Town, on non-contract terms, in July 2005. A falling out with manager Ernie Howe saw Peters leave the club in November 2005, after making 14 appearances and scoring 8 goals. Following four appearances and one goal while with Conference South club Eastleigh on a trial basis, Peters joined Isthmian League Premier Division club AFC Wimbledon, for whom he made six appearances for the club without scoring, before departing on 2 February 2006. Peters finished the 2005–06 season with Frimley Green, for whom he scored 14 goals in 12 appearances.

Peters re-signed for Basingstoke Town in July 2006. He made eight appearances and scored two goals, before joining Wessex League Premier Division club Gosport Borough on a dual-registration on 11 October 2006. Peters scored four goals in his four appearances for the club. He appeared for Southern League First Division South & West club Uxbridge during the second half of the 2006–07 season.

Peters played the first half of the 2007–08 season with Walton & Hersham, scoring five goals in 11 appearances, before playing the second half of the season for Frimley Green. In his fourth spell with the club, Peters remained until the end of the 2008–09 season, by which time he scored 23 goals in 45 appearances.

Peters played the 2009–10, 2010–11 and 2011–12 seasons for Combined Counties League Premier Division club Badshot Lea and scored 24 goals in 74 appearances.

== International career ==
Peters' form for Basingstoke Town won him a call up to the England C team in a friendly versus Conference club Forest Green Rovers on 5 September 2006. Peters began the match as a substitute and came on for Yemi Odubade after 65 minutes of the 1–0 defeat.

== Career statistics ==
Appearances and goals by club, season and competition
| Club | Season | League | | | FA Cup | | League Cup | | Other | | Total | |
| Club | Season | Division | Apps | Goals | Apps | Goals | Apps | Goals | Apps | Goals | Apps | Goals |
|---|---|---|---|---|---|---|---|---|---|---|---|---|
| Brentford | 2002–03 | Second Division | 11 | 1 | 1 | 0 | 0 | 0 | 0 | 0 | 12 | 1 |
| Brentford | 2003–04 | Second Division | 9 | 0 | 1 | 0 | 1 | 0 | 1 (Note: Appearance in Football League Trophy) | 0 | 12 | 0 |
| Brentford | Total | | 20 | 1 | 2 | 0 | 1 | 0 | 1 | 0 | 24 | 1 |
| Farnborough Town | 2003–04 | Conference | 3 | 0 | — | | — | | — | | 3 | 0 |
| Frimley Green | 2004–05 | Combined Counties League Premier Division | 5 | 3 | 0 | 0 | — | | 2 (Note: 1 appearance and 1 goal in FA Vase, 1 appearance and 2 goals in Combined Counties League Premier Challenge Cup) | 3 | 7 | 6 |
| Hornchurch | 2004–05 | Conference South | 0 | 0 | 1 | 0 | — | | — | | 1 | 0 |
| Frimley Green | 2004–05 | Combined Counties League Premier Division | 7 | 8 | — | | — | | — | | 7 | 8 |
| Carshalton Athletic | 2004–05 | Conference South | 10 | 1 | — | | — | | — | | 10 | 1 |
| Basingstoke Town | 2005–06 | Conference South | 11 | 6 | 3 | 2 | — | | — | | 14 | 8 |
| Eastleigh | 2005–06 | Conference South | 4 | 1 | — | | — | | — | | 4 | 1 |
| AFC Wimbledon | 2005–06 | Isthmian League Premier Division | 4 | 0 | — | | — | | 2 (Note: 1 appearance in Isthmian League Cup, 1 appearance in Surrey Senior Cup) | 0 | 6 | 0 |
| Basingstoke Town | 2006–07 | Conference South | 8 | 2 | — | | — | | — | | 8 | 2 |
| Basingstoke Town | Total | | 19 | 8 | 3 | 2 | — | | — | | 22 | 10 |
| Walton & Hersham | 2007–08 | Isthmian League First Division South | 11 | 5 | 0 | 0 | — | | 0 | 0 | 11 | 5 |
| Frimley Green | 2007–08 | Combined Counties League First Division | 21 | 14 | — | | — | | 1 (Note: Appearance in Combined Counties League First Division Challenge Cup) | 0 | 22 | 14 |
| Frimley Green | 2008–09 | Combined Counties League First Division | 22 | 9 | 0 | 0 | — | | 1 | 0 | 23 | 9 |
| Frimley Green | Total | | 55 | 34 | 0 | 0 | — | | 4 | 0 | 59 | 34 |
| Badshot Lea | 2009–10 | Combined Counties League Premier Division | 33 | 16 | 0 | 0 | — | | 2 (Note: Appearances in Combined Counties League Challenge Cup) | 2 | 35 | 18 |
| Badshot Lea | 2010–11 | Combined Counties League Premier Division | 16 | 1 | 0 | 0 | — | | 1 | 0 | 17 | 1 |
| Badshot Lea | 2011–12 | Combined Counties League Premier Division | 21 | 3 | 0 | 0 | — | | 1 | 2 | 22 | 5 |
| Badshot Lea | Total | | 70 | 20 | 0 | 0 | — | | 4 | 4 | 74 | 24 |
| Career total | | | 196 | 70 | 6 | 2 | 1 | 0 | 11 | 7 | 214 | 79 |
