= Jay Smith (footballer, born December 1981) =

English footballer (born 1981)

Personal information
- Full name: Jay Mark Smith
- Date of birth: 29 December 1981 (age 44)
- Place of birth: London, England
- Height: 5 ft 11 in (1.80 m)
- Position: Defender

Youth career
- –1999: Brentford

Senior career*
Years	Team	Apps	(Gls)
1999–2004	Brentford	47	(0)
2004–2006	Farnborough Town	27	(1)
2006–2007	Grays Athletic	22	(0)
2007–2009	Havant & Waterlooville	51	(0)
- * Club domestic league appearances and goals

Jay Mark Smith (born 29 December 1981) is an English retired semi-professional footballer who played as a defender in the Football League for Brentford. After his release in 2004, he dropped into non-League football and played for Farnborough Town, Grays Athletic and Havant & Waterlooville before retiring in 2009.

== Personal life ==
As of 2008, Smith was working in planning.

== Career statistics ==
Appearances and goals by club, season and competition
Club	Season	League			FA Cup		League Cup		Other		Total	
Club	Season	Division	Apps	Goals	Apps	Goals	Apps	Goals	Apps	Goals	Apps	Goals
Brentford	1999–00	Second Division	0	0	0	0	0	0	0	0	0	0
Brentford	2000–01	Second Division	3	0	0	0	0	0	0	0	3	0
Brentford	2001–02	Second Division	0	0	0	0	0	0	1 (Note: Appearances in Football League Trophy)	0	1	0
Brentford	2002–03	Second Division	25	0	2	0	0	0	3	0	30	0
Brentford	2003–04	Second Division	17	0	2	0	1	0	2	0	22	0
Brentford	2004–05	League One	2	0	—		1	0	0	0	3	0
Brentford	Total		47	0	4	0	2	0	6	0	59	0
Farnborough Town	2004–05	Conference Premier	26	1	1	0	—		0	0	27	1
Farnborough Town	2005–06	Conference South	40	0	0	0	—		1 (Note: Appearance in Conference South play-offs)	0	41	0
Farnborough Town	Total		66	1	1	0	—		1	0	79	1
Grays Athletic	2006–07	Conference Premier	22	0	0	0	—		4 (Note: 2 appearances in FA Trophy, 2 appearances in Essex Senior Cup)	0	26	0
Havant & Waterlooville	2007–08	Conference South	38	0	7	0	—		1 (Note: Appearance in FA Trophy)	0	46	0
Havant & Waterlooville	2008–09	Conference South	13	0	4	0	—		2 (Note: 1 appearance in Conference League Cup, 1 appearance in Hampshire Senior Cup)	0	19	0
Havant & Waterlooville	Total		51	0	11	0	—		3	0	65	0
Career total			186	1	16	0	2	0	14	0	229	1
