= Bobby Traynor =

English footballer (born 1983)

Personal information
- Full name: Robert Terence Traynor
- Date of birth: 1 November 1983 (age 42)
- Place of birth: Burnham, England
- Height: 1.75 m (5 ft 9 in)
- Positions: Forward; right midfielder

Senior career*
Years	Team	Apps	(Gls)
2002–2004	Brentford	2	(0)
2003–2004	→ Chelmsford City (loan)	4	(0)
2004	→ Crawley Town (loan)	10	(1)
2004–2005	Crawley Town	19	(3)
2005	Farnborough Town	11	(1)
2005	Maidenhead United	6	(4)
2005–2007	Walton & Hersham	44	(16)
2007–2012	Kingstonian	215	(127)
2013–2014	Walton Casuals	12	(5)
Total		326	(155)
- * Club domestic league appearances and goals

Robert Terence Traynor (born 1 November 1983) is an English retired semi-professional footballer who made over 210 appearances in the Isthmian League for Kingstonian as a forward. He began his career in the Football League with Brentford, before dropping into non-League football upon his release in 2004.

== Career ==
=== Brentford ===
A right midfielder, Traynor began his career in the youth system at Second Division club Brentford and signed his first professional contract in 2002. He made three senior appearances during the 2002–03 season and was an unused substitute on two occasions early in the 2003–04 season, but was released by incoming manager Martin Allen in April 2004.

=== Non-League football ===
While still a Brentford player, Traynor was loaned to Southern League Premier Division clubs Chelmsford City and Crawley Town during the 2003–04 season and joined Crawley on a permanent basis in April 2004. Moves to Farnborough Town, Maidenhead United and Walton & Hersham followed in 2005, before he joined former Walton & Hersham manager Alan Dowson at Isthmian League First Division club Kingstonian in January 2007. Traynor had six successful seasons with the Kingstonian, scoring 146 goals, making 250 appearances, winning three Isthmian League divisional golden boots and helping the club to promotion to the Premier Division during the 2008–09 season. He departed at the end of the 2011–12 season and took a year out of the game, before he finished his career with a short spell at Walton Casuals early in the 2013–14 season.

== Personal life ==
As of September 2012, Traynor was married, living in Cheam and working for an IT assurance company.

== Career statistics ==
Appearances and goals by club, season and competition
Club	Season	League			FA Cup		League Cup		Other		Total	
Club	Season	Division	Apps	Goals	Apps	Goals	Apps	Goals	Apps	Goals	Apps	Goals
Brentford	2002–03	Second Division	2	0	0	0	0	0	1 (Note: Appearance in Football League Trophy)	0	3	0
Brentford	2003–04	Second Division	0	0	—		0	0	0	0	0	0
Brentford	Total		2	0	0	0	0	0	1	0	3	0
Chelmsford City (loan)	2003–04	Southern League Premier Division	4	0	—		—		0	0	4	0
Crawley Town	2003–04	Southern League Premier Division	15	4	—		—		4 (Note: 3 appearances and 1 goal in Southern League Cup, 1 appearance in Sussex Senior Cup)	1	19	5
Crawley Town	2004–05	Conference Premier	14	0	1	0	—		2 (Note: 1 appearance in Sussex Senior Cup, 1 appearance in Southern League Championship Match)	0	17	1
Crawley Town	Total		29	4	1	0	—		6	1	36	6
Farnborough Town	2004–05	Conference Premier	11	1	—		—		0	0	11	1
Maidenhead United	2005–06	Conference South	11	2	0	0	—		0	0	11	2
Walton & Hersham	2005–06	Isthmian League Premier Division	24	12	—		—		0	0	24	12
Walton & Hersham	2006–07	Isthmian League Premier Division	20	4	0	0	—		1 (Note: Appearance in Isthmian League Cup)	0	21	4
Walton & Hersham	Total		44	16	0	0	—		1	0	45	16
Kingstonian	2006–07	Isthmian League First Division South	19	15	—		—		—		19	15
Kingstonian	2007–08	Isthmian League First Division South	37	20	1	0	—		4 (Note: 2 appearances and 2 goals in Surrey Senior Cup, 1 appearance in FA Trophy, 1 appearance and 1 goal in Isthmian League Cup)	3	42	23
Kingstonian	2008–09	Isthmian League First Division South	42	32	4	2	—		4 (Note: 2 appearances and 1 goal in London Senior Cup, 1 appearance and 1 goal in FA Trophy, 1 appearance in Surrey Senior Cup)	2	50	36
Kingstonian	2009–10	Isthmian League Premier Division	42	28	2	3	—		5 (Note: 3 appearances and 2 goals in FA Trophy, 2 appearances and 2 goals in Isthmian League play-offs)	4	49	35
Kingstonian	2010–11	Isthmian League Premier Division	40	23	4	2	—		4 (Note: 2 appearances and 1 goal in FA Trophy, 1 appearance in Isthmian League Cup, 1 appearance in Surrey Senior Cup)	1	48	26
Kingstonian	2011–12	Isthmian League Premier Division	35	9	1	0	—		6 (Note: 3 appearances and 2 goals in London Senior Cup, 1 appearance in FA Trophy, 1 appearance in Isthmian League Cup, 1 appearance in Surrey Senior Cup)	2	42	11
Kingstonian	Total		215	127	12	7	—		23	12	250	146
Walton Casuals	2013–14	Isthmian League First Division South	12	5	0	0	—		3	1	15	6
Career total			328	155	13	0	0	0	34	14	375	177

== Honours ==
Crawley Town

- Southern League Premier Division: 2003–04
- Southern League Cup: 2003–04
- Southern League Championship Match: 2004

Kingstonian

- Isthmian League First Division South: 2008–09

Individual

- FA Cup Player of the Round: first qualifying round, 2009–10
- Isthmian League Premier Division Golden Boot: 2009–10, 2010–11
- Isthmian League First Division Golden Boot: 2008–09
- Isthmian League Monthly Golden Boot: February 2007
