= Stephen Hughes (footballer, born 1984) =

English footballer

Personal information
- Full name: Stephen Thomas Hughes
- Date of birth: 26 January 1984 (age 42)
- Place of birth: London, England
- Position: Midfielder

Youth career
- Luton Town
- Southampton
- –2000: Wycombe Wanderers
- 2000–2002: Brentford

Senior career*
Years	Team	Apps	(Gls)
2002–2004	Brentford	12	(0)
2004	→ Basingstoke Town (loan)	1	(0)
2004	Welling United	11	(5)
2004–2005	Farnborough Town	21	(3)
2005–2006	Maidenhead United	32	(9)
2006	Cambridge City	7	(0)
2006	Braintree Town	8	(2)
2007–2009	Wealdstone	41	(12)
- * Club domestic league appearances and goals

Stephen Thomas Hughes (born 26 January 1984) is an English retired footballer who played as a midfielder in the Football League for Brentford. After his release in 2004, he dropped into non-league football.

== Career statistics ==
Appearances and goals by club, season and competition
Club	Season	League			FA Cup		League Cup		Other		Total	
Club	Season	Division	Apps	Goals	Apps	Goals	Apps	Goals	Apps	Goals	Apps	Goals
Brentford	2002–03	Second Division	3	0	2	0	0	0	1 (Note: Appearances in Football League Trophy)	0	6	0
Brentford	2003–04	Second Division	9	0	2	0	1	0	1	0	13	0
Brentford	Total		12	0	4	0	1	0	2	0	19	0
Basingstoke Town (loan)	2003–04	Isthmian League Premier Division	1	0	—		—		—		1	0
Welling United	2004–05	Conference Premier	11	5	—		—		—		11	5
Farnborough Town	2004–05	Conference Premier	21	3	1	0	—		0	0	22	3
Maidenhead United	2005–06	Conference South	32	9	0	0	—		0	0	32	9
Cambridge City	2005–06	Conference South	7	0	—		—		—		7	0
Braintree Town	2006–07	Conference South	8	2	0	0	—		0	0	8	2
Wealdstone	2007–08	Isthmian League Premier Division	30	8	2	1	—		11 (Note: Five appearances, three goals in FA Trophy; four appearances, two goals in Isthmian League Cup; two appearances, one goal in London Senior Cup)	5	43	14
Wealdstone	2008–09	Isthmian League Premier Division	11	4	2	1	—		1 (Note: Appearance in FA Trophy)	0	14	5
Wealdstone	Total		41	12	4	2	—		12	5	0	0
Career total			133	25	9	2	1	0	14	5	157	32
