= Redbridge F.C. =

Association football club in England

Coordinates: 51°35′7″N 0°5′22″E

Redbridge
- Full name: Redbridge Football Club
- Nickname: The Motormen
- Founded: 1959; 67 years ago (as Ford United)
- Ground: Techsoc.Com Stadium, Barkingside
- Capacity: 3,000
- Chairman: Ricky Eaton
- Manager: Chris Taylor
- League: Isthmian League North Division
- 2025–26: Isthmian League North Division, 5th of 22
Home colours	Away colours

Redbridge Football Club is an English association football club based in Barkingside in the London Borough of Redbridge. Prior to July 2004 the club was known as Ford United F.C. The change of name was chosen to help associate the club within the local area and attract a larger support.

They should not be confused with the former Redbridge Forest, a predecessor of the current Dagenham & Redbridge, though both come from the borough of Redbridge in Greater London.

== History ==
Redbridge Football Club was established through the car manufacturing industry in East London and Essex, originating from the Ford Motors factory in Dagenham. The club was formed in 1959 by the merger of Ford Sports (Dagenham) and Briggs Sports (originally Briggs Motor Bodies), both of which had been established in 1934.

Success followed in the Aetolian League, with multiple title wins. But in 1995, the withdrawal of Ford’s sponsorship threatened the club’s existence. A rescue came in the form of a new sponsorship deal led by vice-chairman George Adams and backed by Sky Sports.

In 2001, the club secured a permanent home at Oakside Stadium by purchasing the lease from Barkingside FC, allowing for substantial ground improvements under Chairman Jimmy Chapman. To reflect its local identity and broaden appeal, the club was rebranded as Redbridge FC in 2004.

After a brief spell in the Conference South, the club faced back-to-back relegations but remained competitive in the Isthmian League Division One North. Under the stewardship of former professional Dean Holdsworth, Redbridge narrowly missed out on promotion in 2007–08.

The 2011–12 season proved to be one of the most memorable in club history. Redbridge reached the Second Round of the FA Cup, beating Ebbsfleet United and Oxford City, before falling to Crawley Town. That cup run captured national attention and marked a high point for the club on the big stage.

Despite moments of promise, financial challenges and changes in management led to a difficult period, and in 2015, Redbridge were relegated to the Essex Senior League for the first time in 19 years. Efforts to bounce back began under a joint management team of Ricky Eaton and Joey May, with the club consistently competing for promotion.

Like all clubs, Redbridge were affected by the COVID-19 pandemic, which curtailed two consecutive seasons. But the team came back strong under manager George Christou, finishing 3rd in 2021–22 and securing promotion back to the Isthmian League the following season via an Inter-League Playoff Final victory over Haywards Heath Town.

In 2023–24, Redbridge achieved a historic milestone by winning the Essex Senior Cup for the first time, beating EFL side Colchester United in a penalty shoot-out.

Following the departure of George Christou in October 2024, Chris Taylor took over as manager, joining from Basildon United.

== Ground ==
Redbridge play their home games at the Techsoc.com Stadium, Barkingside, Ilford, Essex, IG6 1NB. From the start of the 2024-25 season a brand new 3G playing surface was laid. It is currently shared with from the start of the 2026-27 season Hashtag United will commence a ground-share.

== Current squad ==
As of SEP-26

Note: Flags indicate national team as defined under FIFA eligibility rules; some limited exceptions apply. Players may hold more than one non-FIFA nationality.

No.	Pos.	Player	
—	GK		Lewis Greene
—	GK		Christopher Leiper
—	GK		Charlie Mumford
—	DF		Robert Bagnall
—	DF		Reuben Campbell
—	DF		Henry Day
—	DF		Nathan Inga
—	DF		Deivi Kreka
—	DF		Emmanuel Kwatchey
—	DF		Peter Mokwenye
—	DF		Abdulai Sarr
—	DF		Patrick Songe
—	DF		Mekael Williams
—	MF		Philip Brown-Bampoe
—	MF		Jack Chawner
—	MF		Karl Kayembe
—	MF		Ayodeji Olukoga
—	MF		Usisya Longwe
—	FW		Zayshaun Asamoah
—	FW		Nidal Berri
—	FW		Pedro Carvalho
—	FW		Darren Esuka
—	FW		Ramiah Mills
—	FW		Louie Remi
—	FW		Fotsing Pitoula Wabo
—	FW		Thierry Stewart
—	FW		Bruno Tavares

== Honours ==
(includes Ford United)

- Aetolian League
  - winners (1): 1959–60
- Aetolian Division One
  - winners (1): 1961–62
- Essex Senior League
  - winners (2): 1991–92, 1996–97
- Greater London League A Section
  - winners (1): 1970–71
- Isthmian League
  - Division One Champions 2001–02
  - Division Three Champions 1998–99
  - Division Two North Champions 1988–89
- Inter-League Play Off Winners 2022/23

=== Cups ===
(includes Ford United)

- Essex Senior Cup
  - winners (1): 2023–24
- London Senior Cup
  - winners (3): 1993–94, 1997–98, 2000–01
- Essex Senior League Cup
  - winners (1) 1985–86
- Essex Thameside Trophy Winners
  - winners (2): 1998–99, 2003–04
- Essex Senior Trophy
  - winners (2): 1990–91, 1991–92
- Essex Elizabethan Trophy
  - winners (2): 1959–60, 1960–61
- Aetolian League Cup
  - winners (1): 1960–61
- Len Cordell Memorial Cup
  - winners (1): 2020–21
- Peter Butcher Memorial Cup
  - winners (2): 2021–22, 2022–23

== Club records ==
- Record Home Attendance: 1374 v Port Vale, FA Cup 1st Round Replay 19.11.03
- Record Victory: 10–0 v St Margaretsbury(a), Essex Senior League 27.04.19
- Record Defeat: 0–11 v Heybridge Swifts(a), Isthmian League Division One North 29.12.12
- Best league performance: 22nd in Conference South, 2004–05
- Best FA Cup performance: 2nd Round Proper, 2011–12
- Best FA Trophy performance: 3rd Round, 2003–04 and 2004–05
- Best FA Vase performance: 5th Round, 1998–99

== League history ==
As Redbridge F.C.

Season	Division	Position	Top League Goalscorer	Manager(s)	Extra Information
2004–05	Conference South	22nd	Julian Edwards 9	Jim Stannard	Relegated
2005–06	Isthmian League Premier	22nd	Ian Luck 9	Jim Stannard, Alan Fenn	Relegated
2006–07	Isthmian Division One North	16th	Mitch Hahn 10	Alan Fenn	
2007–08	Isthmian Division One North	3rd	Stephen Butterworth & Jeff Hammond 10	Dean Holdsworth	Lost in Playoff Final
2008–09	Isthmian Division One North	8th	Hakeem Araba 17	Jay Devereux	
2009–10	Isthmian Division One North	18th	Leon Diaczuk 13	Jay Devereux, Dave Ross	
2010–11	Isthmian Division One North	16th	Kevin McLeod 12	Dave Ross, Kris Taylor, Jody Brown	
2011–12	Isthmian Division One North	6th	Joe Gardner 13	Terry Spillane	
2012–13	Isthmian Division One North	20th	Jacob Cleaver 16	Del Robinson & Steve Portway	
2013–14	Isthmian Division One North	14th	Daniel Charge 20	Dave Ross & Ricky Eaton	
2014–15	Isthmian Division One North	23rd	Chinedu McKenzie 13	Dave Ross & Ricky Eaton	Reprieved
2015–16	Isthmian Division One North	24th	Jay Knight 11	Dave Ross & Ricky Eaton	Relegated
2016–17	Essex Senior Football League	14th	Jacob Dingli 30	Dave Ross & Ricky Eaton	
2017–18	Essex Senior Football League	4th	Brian Moses 33	Joey May & Ricky Eaton	
2018–19	Essex Senior Football League	12th	Daniel Gilchrist 18	Joey May & Ricky Eaton/Micky Wetherall	
2019–20	Essex Senior Football League	season expunged due to COVID-19		Micky Wetherall	
2020–21	Essex Senior Football League	season curtailed due to COVID-19		Micky Wetherall/George Christou + Jack Toghli	
2021–22	Essex Senior Football League	3rd	Ibrahim Kehinde 24	George Christou + Jack Toghli	
2022–23	Essex Senior Football League	2nd	Tony Martin 13	George Christou + Jack Toghli	won Inter League Play Off Final- Promoted
2023–24	Isthmian League	13th	Louie Johnson 10, Solomon Ogunwomoju 10	George Christou + Jack Toghli	
2024–25	Isthmian League	12th	Tendi Quamina 13	George Christou + Jack Toghli, Joey May + Ricky Eaton, Chris Taylor	
2025–26	Isthmian League	5th	Malachi Napa 26	Chris Taylor	Lost in Playoff Final
