= Lee Fieldwick =

English footballer

Personal information
- Full name: Lee Peter Fieldwick
- Date of birth: 6 September 1982 (age 44)
- Place of birth: Croydon, England
- Height: 1.80 m (5 ft 11 in)
- Position: Left back

Youth career
- –2001: Brentford

Senior career*
Years	Team	Apps	(Gls)
2001–2004	Brentford	12	(0)
2004	→ Swansea City (loan)	5	(0)
2004–2005	Lewes	13	(0)
2005	→ Maidenhead United (loan)	4	(0)
2005	St Albans City	1	(1)
2006–2007	Bromley	12	(0)
- West Wickham
Total		47	(1)
- * Club domestic league appearances and goals

Lee Fieldwick (born 6 September 1982) is an English retired former professional footballer who played as a left back in the Football League for Brentford and Swansea City. After his release from Brentford in 2004, he had a brief career in non-League football and later played amateur football.

== Career ==
=== Brentford ===
A left back, Fieldwick began his career in the youth system at Brentford and signed his first professional contract in 2001. Illness and injury prevented Fieldwick from progressing into the first team squad during the 2001–02 season and he had to wait until 14 January 2003 for his first call into the team, when he was an unused substitute during a 2–1 Second Division defeat to Oldham Athletic. He made his senior debut with a start in a 1–0 victory over Luton Town on 22 February 2003 and finished an injury-hit 2002–03 season with seven appearances. Fieldwick signed a new two-year contract in May 2003 and was a regular pick in the squad during the first two months of the 2003–04 season, but managed only five appearances, with four starts and one as a substitute. He had dropped out of the squad entirely by December 2003 and departed on loan for the rest of the season on transfer deadline day in March 2004. Fieldwick was released by manager Martin Allen in late April 2004 and he departed having made just 12 appearances during three seasons as a professional at Griffin Park.

==== Swansea City (loan) ====
On 25 March 2003, Fieldwick joined Third Division club Swansea City on loan until the end of the 2003–04 season. He made five appearances before dropping out of the squad.

=== Non-league football ===
Fieldwick finished his career with a short spell in non-League football, playing for Conference South clubs Lewes, Maidenhead United, St Albans City and Bromley between 2004 and 2007. He later played for Southern Amateur League club West Wickham.

== Career statistics ==
Appearances and goals by club, season and competition
Club	Season	League			FA Cup		League Cup		Other		Total	
Club	Season	Division	Apps	Goals	Apps	Goals	Apps	Goals	Apps	Goals	Apps	Goals
Brentford	2002–03	Second Division	7	0	0	0	0	0	0	0	7	0
Brentford	2003–04	Second Division	5	0	0	0	0	0	0	0	5	0
Brentford	Total		12	0	0	0	0	0	0	0	12	0
Swansea City (loan)	2003–04	Third Division	5	0	—		—		—		5	0
Lewes	2004–05	Conference South	13	0	0	0	—		0	0	13	0
Maidenhead United (loan)	2004–05	Conference South	4	0	—		—		—		4	0
St Albans City	2004–05	Conference South	1	1	—		—		—		1	1
Bromley	2006–07	Conference South	12	0	1	0	—		0	0	13	0
Career total			47	1	1	0	0	0	0	0	48	1
