= Eddie Hutchinson =

English footballer (born 1982)

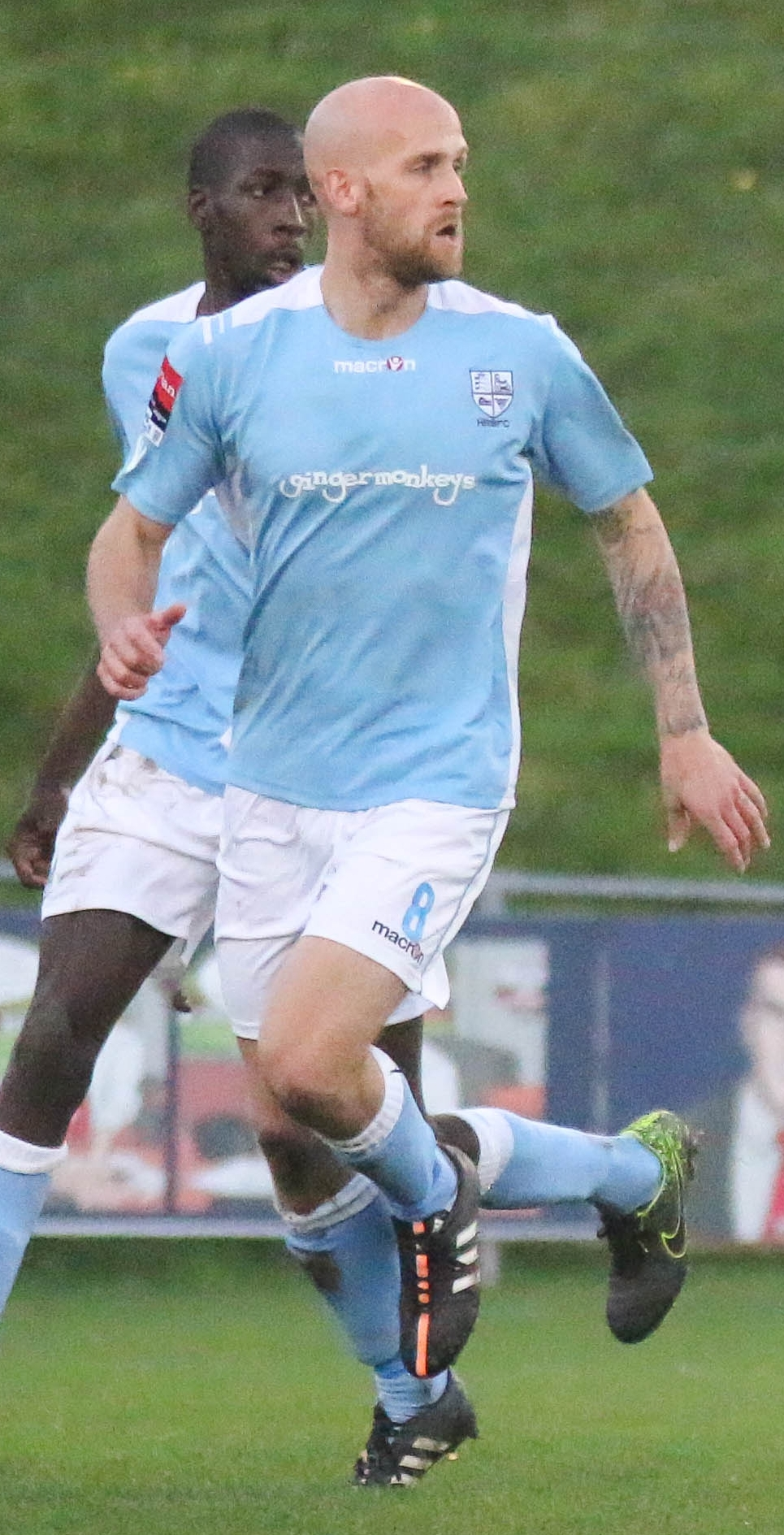
- Hutchinson playing for Hampton & Richmond Borough in 2015.

Personal information
- Full name: Edward Stephen Hutchinson
- Date of birth: 23 February 1982 (age 44)
- Place of birth: Kingston upon Thames, London, England
- Position: Midfielder

Senior career*
Years	Team	Apps	(Gls)
–2000	Sutton United		
2000–2006	Brentford	115	(8)
2006–2009	Oxford United	72	(3)
2009–2010	Crawley Town	39	(2)
2011–2012	Eastbourne Borough	37	(3)
2012–2014	Havant & Waterlooville	65	(2)
2014–2015	Maidenhead United	29	(2)
2015–2016	Hampton & Richmond Borough	35	(3)
- * Club domestic league appearances and goals

Edward Stephen Hutchinson (born 23 February 1982) is an English retired professional footballer who made over 110 appearances in the Football League for Brentford. He was a combative, energetic central midfield player.

== Career ==
=== Brentford ===
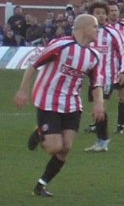
Hutchinson playing for Brentford in 2005.

Hutchinson started out at non-League Sutton United, before leaving to join Brentford as an 18-year-old. The player spent six years at Griffin Park, clocking up in excess of a century of league appearances. Hutchinson was not a regular scorer during his time at Brentford, but did score in a fifth-round FA Cup replay against Premier League Southampton in March 2005. Despite opening the scoring, Brentford went on to lose the match 3–1.

=== Oxford United ===
Upon being released by Brentford, the player attracted interest from various clubs. Hutchinson ultimately signed up with Oxford United, spending three years at the Kassam Stadium. Whilst at Oxford, Hutchinson made 72 league appearances, thirty of which were from the substitutes bench. The midfielder fell out of the favour during his last season at Oxford, being placed on the transfer list midway through the campaign. Hutchinson was also inadvertently embroiled in controversy during his final season at Oxford. The club were deducted five points for playing Hutchinson although the player had not been adequately registered.

=== Non-league football ===
Upon leaving Oxford United, Hutchinson signed for Crawley Town. He was a mainstay in the first-team throughout his first season at Crawley, appearing in 39 league games, scoring his first goal for the Red Devils on only his second appearance for the club against Forest Green Rovers.

He joined Eastbourne Borough on 1 January 2011, moving to Havant & Waterlooville just over a year later in February 2012. In the summer of 2014, Hutchinson joined Maidenhead United, staying for one season before moving to Hampton & Richmond Borough. He won the Isthmian League Premier Division title in his only season with the 'Beavers'.

== Personal life ==
He is the twin brother of Kingstonian centre back Tom Hutchinson.

== Career statistics ==
Appearances and goals by club, season and competition
Club	Season	League			FA Cup		League Cup		Other		Total	
Club	Season	Division	Apps	Goals	Apps	Goals	Apps	Goals	Apps	Goals	Apps	Goals
Brentford	2000–01	Second Division	7	0	0	0	0	0	0	0	7	0
Brentford	2001–02	Second Division	8	0	1	0	0	0	1 (Note: Appearance(s) in Football League Trophy)	0	10	0
Brentford	2002–03	Second Division	23	0	0	0	2	0	1	0	26	0
Brentford	2003–04	Second Division	36	5	1	0	1	0	1	0	39	5
Brentford	2004–05	League One	14	1	6	1	0	0	2 (Note: Appearance(s) in League One play-offs)	0	23	2
Brentford	2005–06	League One	27	2	3	0	0	0	1	0	31	2
Brentford	Total		115	8	11	1	3	0	6	0	135	9
Oxford United	2006–07	Conference Premier	18	0	2	0	―		1 (Note: Appearance(s) in FA Trophy)	0	19	0
Oxford United	2007–08	Conference Premier	28	1	2	0	―		2	0	32	1
Oxford United	2008–09	Conference Premier	28	2	3	0	―		3 (Note: 2 appearances in FA Trophy, 1 appearance and 1 goal in Conference League Cup)	1	34	3
Oxford United	Total		72	3	7	0	―		6	1	85	4
Crawley Town	2009–10	Conference Premier	39	2	0	0	―		0	0	39	2
Crawley Town	2010–11	Conference Premier	1	0	0	0	―		―		1	0
Crawley Town	Total		40	2	0	0	―		0	0	40	2
Eastbourne Borough	2010–11	Conference Premier	18	0	―		―		2	0	20	0
Eastbourne Borough	2011–12	Conference South	19	3	3	0	―		2 (Note: Appearance(s) in Sussex Senior Challenge Cup)	0	24	3
Eastbourne Borough	Total		37	3	3	0	―		4	0	44	3
Havant & Waterlooville	2011–12	Conference South	13	0	―		―		0	0	13	0
Havant & Waterlooville	2012–13	Conference South	34	1	0	0	―		2	0	36	1
Havant & Waterlooville	2013–14	Conference South	18	1	0	0	―		3	0	21	1
Havant & Waterlooville	Total		65	2	0	0	―		5	0	70	2
Maidenhead United	2014–15	Conference South	29	2	0	0	―		1	0	30	2
Hampton & Richmond Borough	2015–16	Isthmian League Premier Division	35	3	1	0	―		6 (Note: 4 appearances in FA Trophy, 2 appearances and 2 goals in Middlesex Senior Cup)	2	42	5
Career total			393	23	22	1	3	0	28	3	446	27

== Honours ==
Hampton & Richmond Borough

- Isthmian League Premier Division: 2015–16
