= Jamie Fullarton =

Scottish footballer and manager

Personal information
- Full name: James Fullarton
- Date of birth: 20 July 1974 (age 52)
- Place of birth: Bellshill, Scotland
- Position: Midfielder

Senior career*
Years	Team	Apps	(Gls)
1991–1996	St Mirren	143	(13)
1996–1997	SC Bastia	27	(0)
1997–2000	Crystal Palace	77	(1)
1999	→ Bolton Wanderers (loan)	1	(0)
2000–2002	Dundee United	16	(0)
2002–2003	Brentford	37	(1)
2003–2004	Southend United	17	(0)
2004	Chesterfield	1	(0)
2005	Woodlands Wellington	16	(0)
Total		363	(15)

International career
1993–1996	Scotland U21	18	(0)

Managerial career
- 2013–2014: Bolton Wanderers Reserves
- 2016: Notts County
- 2018–2019: FC Halifax Town
- * Club domestic league appearances and goals

James Fullarton (born 20 July 1974) is a Scottish professional football manager and former player.

Fullarton played for several clubs in Scotland, France and England, including St Mirren, Bastia, Crystal Palace, Bolton Wanderers, Dundee United, Brentford and Southend United. He was briefly the manager of Notts County in 2016, but was dismissed after 12 games in charge. He managed National League club FC Halifax Town from February 2018 to July 2019.

== Playing career ==
Fullarton won 18 Scotland under-21 caps, captaining the side at the 1996 under-21 European Championship, where they reached the semi-finals.

He spent the first six years of his career with St Mirren before moving to French side SC Bastia in 1996. After a year with Les Bleus, he moved to Crystal Palace, where he managed nearly 80 appearances in three years. At Palace he scored once; his goal coming in a 1–1 Premier League draw with Coventry City on 24 September 1997.

After a short loan spell with Bolton Wanderers, Fullarton moved back to Scotland with Dundee United, although injury restricted him to only 20 appearances during his two years at Tannadice. It was at United in November 2000 that he received a serious injury, where a dislocation and double break of the ankle resulted in nearly ten minutes of on-field treatment. The injury was so severe that Fullarton was close to having his foot amputated.

After his release from United, Fullarton made 37 appearances for Brentford where he scored on his debut against Huddersfield Town. He then moved to Southend United where after 17 appearances he suffered a serious knee injury at Chesterfield which required total reconstruction. He retired in 2005 after an attempted comeback in Singapore with Woodlands Wellington, failed.

== Coaching career ==
Fullarton moved to Spain where he set up his own football academy, running teams from under-8 to under-19, playing against Spanish lower league professional club's academies. Seven years on the academy is still running with over 200 players in the system and a number having graduated to sign for professional clubs in both Spain and England.

In July 2011, Fullarton took over as Youth Team Coach at Bristol Rovers.

However, in the summer of 2012, he became the coach of the Bolton Wanderers under-21s from where he was released by mutual consent in October 2014, following the departure of manager, Dougie Freedman. Fullarton still oversees his football academy, Costa Unida, in Spain.

== Managerial career ==
On 10 January 2016, he was unveiled as manager of League Two club Notts County. Fullarton was dismissed by Notts County on 19 March 2016, following a 4–1 home defeat to Exeter City.

On 20 February 2018, Fullarton was announced as the new manager of FC Halifax Town, following the departure of Billy Heath. His first game in charge was an away game against Eastleigh on 24 February. Fullarton resigned as Halifax manager on 15 July 2019, after leading the team to a 16th-place finish in the 2018–19 National League.

== Managerial statistics ==
As of 15 July 2019

Managerial record by team and tenure
Team	From	To	Record					Ref.
Team	From	To	P	W	D	L	Win %	Ref.
Notts County	10 January 2016	19 March 2016	12	3	1	8	25.0	
FC Halifax Town	20 February 2018	15 July 2019	65	20	27	18	30.8	
Total			77	23	28	26	29.9	
