= Jim Stannard =

English footballer

Personal information
- Full name: James David Stannard
- Date of birth: 6 October 1962 (age 64)
- Place of birth: Harold Hill, England
- Height: 6 ft 0 in (1.83 m)
- Position: Goalkeeper

Team information
- Current team: Welling United (goalkeeper coach)

Youth career
- Ford United

Senior career*
Years	Team	Apps	(Gls)
1980–1985	Fulham	41	(0)
1984	→ Southend United (loan)	6	(0)
1985	→ Charlton Athletic (loan)	1	(0)
1985–1987	Southend United	103	(0)
1987–1995	Fulham	348	(1)
1995–1999	Gillingham	106	(0)
2003	Brentford	0	(0)
Total		605	(1)

Managerial career
- 2005: Redbridge
- * Club domestic league appearances and goals

James David Stannard (born 6 October 1962) is an English retired football goalkeeper. Whilst playing for Gillingham he set a record for the lowest number of goals conceded in a 46-match season in the Football League, when he let in just 20 goals in the 1995–96 season. Until 18 January 2013, he was first-team goalkeeping coach at Southampton. Stannard is currently the first team goalkeeper coach for Welling United.

== Playing career ==
Having previously played for non-league Ford United (now Redbridge), Stannard began his professional career with Fulham making his debut against Swindon Town in 1981 (keeping a clean sheet), but managed only 41 Football League appearances for the Craven Cottage club in his first five years, during which he was loaned out to Southend United and Charlton Athletic. In 1985 Southend signed him on a permanent basis and he made over 100 appearances before being sold back to Fulham in 1987.

For the next eight years he was Fulham's first-choice keeper. He was affectionately known by Fulham supporters as "He's fat, he's round, he's worth a million pounds" or "He's fat, he's round, he can't get off the ground". But Stannard never played against many top English teams as his term was during a time when Fulham were in the lower divisions of the Football League. In 1995 manager Tony Pulis made him one of his first signings for Gillingham and, despite the fans' initial reservations about his age and burly build, Stannard proved instrumental in the Kent club's promotion from Division Three as he let in just 20 goals all season, a then-record for a 46-match league season (since surpassed by Burnley in 2024-25), while keeping 29 clean sheets. Stannard was named in the 1995–96 PFA Division Three Team of the Year.

Stannard retired in 1999, but came out of retirement to sign for Division Two side Brentford on a non-contract basis in 2003, backing up Alan Julian for two matches during the early months of the 2003–04 season.

== Coaching career ==
Stannard was forced to retire in 1999 due to injury and later served as goalkeeping coach at Gillingham and Brentford. In January 2005 he was appointed manager of non-league Redbridge, the club where he had started his career in 1980, but his reign only lasted until October of the same year. It was announced in July 2007 that he had returned to Gillingham as goalkeeping coach on a part-time basis. Stannard later served as goalkeeping coach for Crystal Palace from January 2008, until he was made redundant in May 2010. After this, he again returned to Gillingham on a part-time basis.

Stannard left Gillingham to join Championship club Southampton at the start of the 2011–12 season as first team goalkeeping coach. He was dismissed, along with manager Nigel Adkins, on 18 January 2013. In July 2013, he joined Chelmsford City as goalkeeping coach.

In May 2018, following six years working with the club, he departed his role as goalkeeping coach at Dagenham & Redbridge on account of a club reorganisation. Following his departure, he joined fellow National League side Bromley in the same role, a role he held until September 2020. He subsequently joined Maidstone United, working for free at the club.

In June 2024, Stannard was appointed goalkeeper coach at National League South side Welling United.

== Honours ==
Individual

- Gillingham Player of the Season: 1995–96
- Southend Player of the Season: 1986–87
- PFA Team of the Year: Division Three (1995–96), Division Four (1986–87)
