= Lloyd Blackman (footballer) =

English footballer

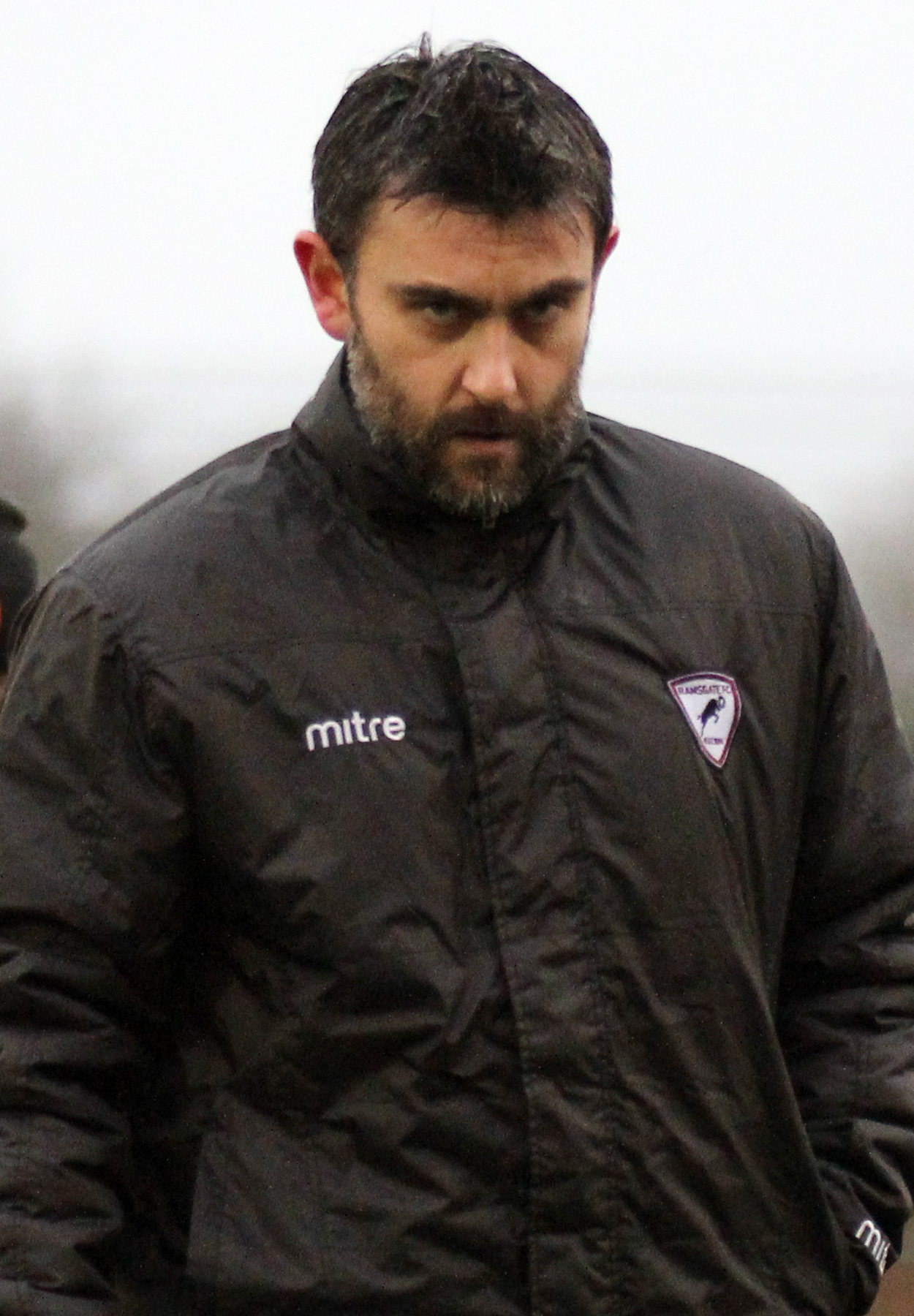
- Blackman managing Ramsgate in January 2018

Personal information
- Full name: Lloyd Jason Blackman
- Date of birth: 24 September 1983 (age 43)
- Place of birth: Ashford, England
- Position: Forward

Team information
- Current team: Folkestone Invicta (assistant manager)

Youth career
- Crystal Palace
- –2002: Brentford

Senior career*
Years	Team	Apps	(Gls)
2002–2004	Brentford	4	(0)
2003	→ Scarborough (loan)	6	(0)
2003	→ Chelmsford City (loan)	6	(4)
2004	→ Cambridge City (loan)	7	(1)
2004–2005	Farnborough Town	26	(5)
2005–2006	Woking	27	(0)
2006	Bishop's Stortford	4	(1)
2006	Bromley	9	(1)
2006–2007	Crawley Town	18	(0)
2007	Llanelli	0	(0)
2007–2008	Welling United	8	(0)
2008	Folkestone Invicta	17	(3)
2008–2009	Maidstone United	42	(12)
2009–2010	Margate	34	(14)
2010	Carshalton Athletic	8	(0)
2010–2011	Whitstable Town	24	(6)
2011	Hythe Town	9	(2)
2011–2012	Chatham Town	23	(7)
2012–2014	Hythe Town	13	(1)
2014–2015	Ashford United	10	(0)

Managerial career
- 2017–2018: Ramsgate
- 2019–2022: Whitstable Town
- * Club domestic league appearances and goals

Lloyd Jason Blackman (born 24 September 1983) is an English retired semi-professional footballer who is assistant manager of National League South club Folkestone Invicta. As a player, he played as a forward in the Football League for Brentford and after his release in 2004, he embarked on a nomadic career in non-League football. He began coaching while still a player and managed Ramsgate and Whitstable Town.

== Career ==
=== Brentford ===
A forward, Blackman began his career in the youth system at Crystal Palace and later moved to Brentford, where he began a scholarship in 2000. He progressed to sign his first professional contract in 2002. He made his first team debut with a start in a 5–1 Second Division defeat to Peterborough United on 28 September 2002, which proved to be his only appearance of the 2002–03 season. After signing a new one-year contract in May 2003, Blackman made just four appearances during 2003–04 and spent much of the season away on loan at non-League clubs Scarborough, Chelmsford City and Cambridge City. He was released in late April 2004, after having made just five appearances during two seasons as a professional at Griffin Park.

=== Non-League football ===
In 2004, Blackman embarked on a career in non-League football. Between 2004 and 2015, he played in the Conference, Isthmian League, Southern League and Southern Counties East League for 15 clubs.

== International career ==
In October 2004, Blackman was named in manager Paul Fairclough's initial 30-man England National Game XI squad for a match versus Serie C on 10 November 2004. He was not named in the final 16-man squad.

== Managerial and coaching career ==
Between 2012 and 2015, Blackman held the role of first team coach at Hythe Town and Ashford United respectively. He moved to Isthmian League First Division South club Ramsgate as first team coach in December 2015 and was promoted to manager in January 2017. He stayed in the role until resigning in December 2018. On 17 April 2019, it was announced that Blackman would take up the role of manager at Isthmian League South East Division club Whitstable Town from the beginning of the 2019–20 season. He presided over two abandoned seasons and departed in September 2021. One month later, he joined Isthmian League Premier Division club Margate as assistant manager. In May 2022, Blackman followed former Margate manager Jay Saunders to National League South club Tonbridge Angels. On 31 March 2025, Blackman followed Saunders to Isthmian League Premier Division club Folkestone Invicta.

== Career statistics ==
Appearances and goals by club, season and competition
Club	Season	League			FA Cup		League Cup		Europe		Other		Total	
Club	Season	Division	Apps	Goals	Apps	Goals	Apps	Goals	Apps	Goals	Apps	Goals	Apps	Goals
Brentford	2002–03	Second Division	1	0	0	0	0	0	—		0	0	1	0
Brentford	2003–04	Second Division	3	0	0	0	1	0	—		—		4	0
Brentford	Total		4	0	0	0	1	0	—		0	0	5	0
Scarborough (loan)	2003–04	Conference	6	0	—		—		—		1 (Note: 2 appearances in Football League Trophy, 2 appearances in FA Trophy)	0	6	0
Chelmsford City (loan)	2003–04	Southern League Premier Division	6	4	—		—		—		—		6	4
Cambridge City (loan)	2003–04	Southern League Premier Division	7	1	—		—		—		—		7	1
Farnborough Town	2004–05	Conference Premier	26	5	0	0	—		—		0	0	26	5
Woking	2005–06	Conference Premier	27	0	2	0	—		—		4	1	33	1
Bishop's Stortford	2006–07	Conference South	4	1	0	0	—		—		0	0	4	1
Bromley	2006–07	Isthmian League Premier Division	9	1	1	0	—		—		1 (Note: Appearance in Isthmian League Cup)	0	11	1
Crawley Town	2006–07	Conference Premier	18	0	—		—		—		—		18	0
Llanelli	2007–08	Welsh Premier League	—		—		—		1 (Note: Appearance in UEFA Intertoto Cup)	0	—		1	0
Welling United	2007–08	Conference South	8	0	0	0	—		—		0	0	8	0
Folkestone Invicta	2007–08	Isthmian League Premier Division	17	3	—		—		—		—		17	3
Maidstone United	2008–09	Isthmian League Premier Division	42	12	4	1	—		—		4 (Note: 3 appearances in FA Trophy, 1 appearance in Isthmian League Cup)	0	50	13
Margate	2009–10	Isthmian League Premier Division	34	14	2	0	—		—		1	0	37	14
Carshalton Athletic	2010–11	Isthmian League Premier Division	8	0	0	0	—		—		1	0	9	0
Whitstable Town	2010–11	Isthmian League First Division South	24	6	—		—		—		—		24	6
Hythe Town	2011–12	Isthmian League First Division South	9	2	3	2	—		—		2 (Note: 1 appearance in FA Trophy, 1 appearance in Isthmian League Cup)	0	14	2
Chatham Town	2011–12	Isthmian League First Division North	23	7	—		—		—		1 (Note: Appearance in Kent Senior Cup)	1	24	8
Hythe Town	2012–13	Isthmian League First Division South	4	0	0	0	—		—		0	0	4	0
Hythe Town	2013–14	Isthmian League First Division South	9	1	0	0	—		—		0	0	9	1
Hythe Town	Total		22	3	3	2	—		—		2	0	27	5
Ashford United	2014–15	Southern Counties East League	10	3	1	0	—		—		0	0	11	3
Ashford United	2015–16	Southern Counties East League	0	0	1	0	—		—		0	0	1	0
Ashford United	Total		10	0	2	0	—		—		0	0	12	0
Career total			295	60	14	3	1	0	1	0	15	1	326	64
