= Jide Olugbodi =

Nigerian footballer (born 1977)

Personal information
- Full name: Jide Michael Olugbodi
- Date of birth: 29 November 1977 (age 48)
- Place of birth: Lagos, Nigeria
- Height: 1.80 m (5 ft 11 in)
- Position: Forward

Senior career*
Years	Team	Apps	(Gls)
1996–1997	Mohammedan		
1997	Schaffhausen		
1997–1999	Rot-Weiß Oberhausen		
1999–2003	Austria Lustenau		
2003	Brentford	2	(0)
- * Club domestic league appearances and goals

Jide Michael Olugbodi (born 29 November 1977) is a Nigerian footballer who played professionally for Mohammedan SC, Schaffhausen, Rot-Weiß Oberhausen, Austria Lustenau and Brentford. Olugbodi had been called up to the Nigeria squad on numerous occasions, but failed to make an appearance.

== Career ==
=== Club career ===
Olugbodi played for Bangladeshi side Mohammedan SC before moving to Swiss side Schaffhausen in 1997. He then joined German side Rot-Weiß Oberhausen staying for two years before joining Austrian club Austria Lustenau.

In October 2003, Olugbodi joined English Second Division side Brentford. He made his debut in the 3–0 home defeat to Sheffield Wednesday on 4 October, replacing Eddie Hutchinson as a substitute in the 72nd minute. Olugbodi signed a new short-term contract with Brentford in early November, keeping him at the club until December. He made a total of five appearances for Brentford in all competitions, including the Second Division, the Football League Trophy and FA Cup without scoring a goal.

=== International career ===
Olugbodi was called up to the Nigeria squad to face Jamaica at Loftus Road in London on 7 November 2001. Due to injury, he was forced to withdraw from the 54-man Nigeria squad that was due to play Paraguay in March 2002, along with other forwards John Utaka and Dele Adebola.
