= Wu Jide =

Chinese politician

- 吴继德

Executive Vice Mayor of Lanzhou
- In office November 2005 – September 2010

Vice-Mayor of Lanzhou
- In office March 2002 – November 2005

Communist Party Secretary of Yuzhong County
- In office July 1999 – March 2002

Personal details
- Born: September 1955 (age 71) Tongwei County, Gansu, China
- Party: Chinese Communist Party
- Education: Dingxi College of Agriculture; Central Party School of the Chinese Communist Party

Chinese name
- Traditional Chinese: 吳繼德
- Simplified Chinese: 吴继德
Transcriptions
Standard Mandarin
- Hanyu Pinyin: Wu Jide

Wu Jide (born September 1955) is a Chinese politician from Gansu province. He was investigated by the Chinese Communist Party's anti-graft agency in October 2014. Previously he served as the deputy head of the United Front Work Department of the CPC Gansu province Committee.

== Life and career ==
Wu was born and raised in Tongwei County, Gansu. He entered Dingxi College of Agriculture in September 1976, where he graduated in September 1978.

Wu began his political career in September 1978, and joined the Chinese Communist Party in December 1983.

From September 1978 to January 1984, he worked in Tongwei County.

Beginning in 1984, he served in several posts in Dingxi, including deputy head of the Propaganda Department of the Communist Youth League of Dingxi, head of the Propaganda Department of the Communist Youth League of Dingxi, and deputy party chief of Communist Youth League of Dingxi.

In August 1989 he was promoted to become deputy party chief of Zhangzhou County, a position he held until June 1991, then he was transferred to Lanzhou, capital of Gansu province, he served as deputy party chief of Xigu District from December 1994 to September 1997.

In September 1997, he became deputy party chief and magistrate of Yuzhong County, and two years later promoted to the party chief position, the top political position in the County.

In March 2002, he was appointed the vice mayor of Lanzhou, he remained in that position until November 2005, when he was promoted to become deputy party chief and executive vice mayor.

In September 2010, he was promoted again to become deputy head of the United Front Work Department of the CPC Gansu province Committee, he concurrently served as party chief and vice-president of Gansu Provincial Federation of Industry and Commerce.

== Downfall ==
On October 22, 2014, he was being investigated by the Central Commission for Discipline Inspection for "serious violations of laws and regulations". In November 2014, he has been placed on file for further investigation.

In April 2015, he was expelled from the Chinese Communist Party (CCP) and removed from public office. On October 14, he was indicted on suspicion of accepting bribes.

On January 7, 2017, he was eventually sentenced to a 16-year jail and fined 650,000 yuan for taking bribes and abusing his public power by the Zhangye Intermediate People's Court. He was accused of illegally accepting money and gifts amounting to over 11.92 million yuan and 30600 US dollars while holding various government positions between 2000 and 2014 in Gansu, absorbing more than 66.96 million yuan of public deposits and misappropriating more than 8.15 million yuan of public funds.
