= Football League Second Division Manager of the Month =

English football award

The Football League Second Division Manager of the Month award was a monthly prize of recognition given to association football managers in the Football League Second Division, the third tier of English football from 1992 to 2004. The award was announced in the first week of the following month. From the 2004–05 season onwards, following a rebranding exercise by The Football League, the third tier was known as Football League One, thus the award became the Football League One Manager of the Month award. The awards are designed and manufactured in the UK by bespoke awards company Gaudio Awards.

== Winners ==
=== 2000–01 ===
Month	Manager	Team	Ref
August	(England) Ray Graydon	Walsall	
September	(England) Alan Pardew	Reading	
October	(England) Ronnie Moore	Rotherham United	
November	(Scotland) Bruce Rioch	Wigan Athletic	
December	(Scotland) Jocky Scott	Notts County	
January	(Republic of Ireland) Sean O'Driscoll	Bournemouth	
February	(Scotland) Mark McGhee	Millwall	
March	(England) Brian Horton	Port Vale	
April	(Scotland) Mark McGhee	Millwall	

=== 2001–02 ===
Month	Manager	Team	Ref
August	(England) Danny Wilson	Bristol City	
September	(England) Micky Adams	Brighton & Hove Albion	
October			
November	(England) Alan Pardew	Reading	
December	(England) Danny Wilson	Bristol City	
January	(England) Alan Pardew	Reading	
February			
March	(England) Bill Dearden	Notts County	
April			

=== 2002–03 ===
Month	Manager	Team	Ref
August	(England) Harry Redknapp	Portsmouth	
September	(Northern Ireland) Iain Dowie	Oldham Athletic	
October	(England) Danny Wilson	Bristol City	
November	(England) Paul Jewell	Wigan Athletic	
December	(England) Paul Jewell	Wigan Athletic	
January	(England) Neil Warnock	Sheffield United	
February	(England) Ian Holloway	Queens Park Rangers	
March	(England) Phil Parkinson	Colchester United	
April	(England) Barry Fry	Peterborough United	

=== 2003–04 ===
Month	Manager	Team	Ref
August			
September	(England) Phil Parkinson	Colchester United	
October	(England) Joe Royle	Ipswich Town	
November	(England) Ian Holloway	Queens Park Rangers	
December	(Scotland) Paul Sturrock	Plymouth Argyle	
January	(England) Danny Wilson	Bristol City	
February	(England) Mike Newell	Luton Town	
March	(Scotland) Mark McGhee	Brighton & Hove Albion	
April	(England) Brian Little	Tranmere Rovers	
