= Wally Downes =

English football player, coach and manager

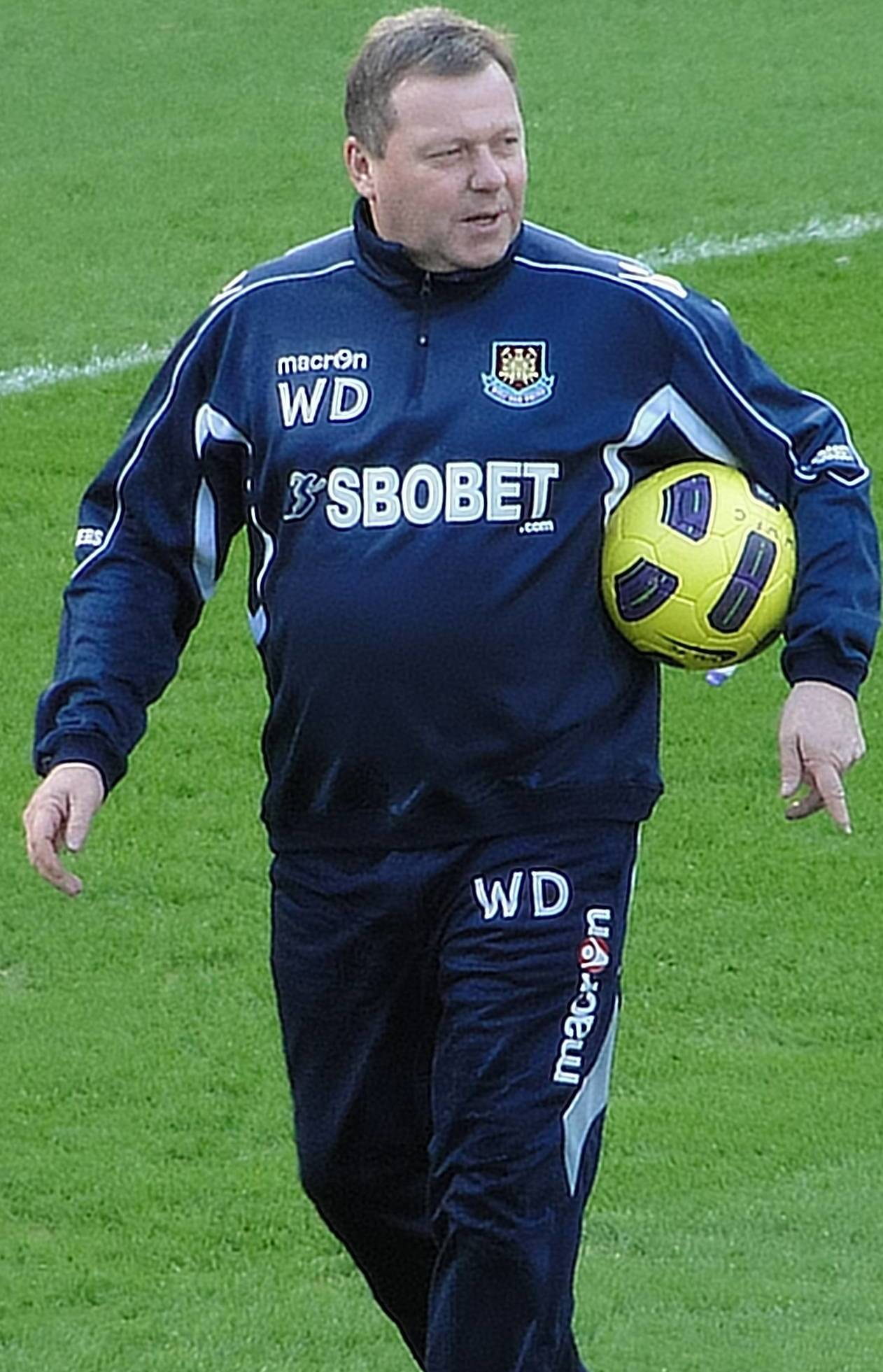
- Downes with West Ham United in 2011

Personal information
- Full name: Walter John Downes
- Date of birth: 9 June 1961 (age 65)
- Place of birth: Hammersmith, England
- Height: 5 ft 10 in (1.78 m)
- Position: Midfielder

Team information
- Current team: Lions Gibraltar (manager)

Youth career
- Wimbledon

Senior career*
Years	Team	Apps	(Gls)
1979–1988	Wimbledon	207	(15)
1987	→ Newport County (loan)	4	(2)
1988	Sheffield United	9	(1)
1988	Hayes		
Total		220	(18)

Managerial career
- 2002–2004: Brentford
- 2018–2019: AFC Wimbledon
- 2025–: Lions Gibraltar
- * Club domestic league appearances and goals

Walter John Downes (born 9 June 1961) is an English professional football manager and former player who is currently the manager of Gibraltar Football League side Lions Gibraltar.

As a midfielder, Downes played the majority of his career for Wimbledon as well as shorter spells with Newport County, Sheffield United and Hayes. He was previously the manager of Brentford between 2002 and 2004 and AFC Wimbledon between 2018 and 2019.

== Early and personal life ==
Downes was born in Hammersmith, London. He is the nephew of former world middleweight boxing champion Terry Downes.

== Playing career ==
Downes started out as an apprentice with Wimbledon and was their first ever full-time Football League apprentice. He is often cited as being the main instigator of the Crazy Gang spirit at the club, as it rose from the Fourth to the First Division inside a decade. In 1979, aged 17 he scored on his league debut against Barnsley and went on to make over 200 appearances for Wimbledon, usually as a midfielder.

In 1988, he left to join his mentor and former Wimbledon manager Dave Bassett at Sheffield United, but his career for his new club was severely limited by a number of serious injuries, and also by a poor disciplinary record, getting sent off twice in his nine appearances.

== Coaching career ==
=== Crystal Palace ===
Following four broken legs he retired through injury. Downes took a coaching position at Crystal Palace, and spent 12 years at Selhurst Park, most of these under Steve Coppell.

=== Reading ===
Downes then once again rejoined Coppell, this time at Reading, initially on a casual basis, but quickly proved himself invaluable, and took on the job of coaching Reading's defence. As a result, Downes was a major reason for Reading's impressive defensive display in the 2005–06 Championship season, where Reading had the best defensive statistics in the entire English football pyramid, and were promoted to the Premier League with a record 106 points.

In January 2007, Downes was involved in a touchline scuffle with Sheffield United manager Neil Warnock after he accused Warnock of telling his players to 'break legs'. However Warnock said: "I made the kicking gesture to tell the referee that Steve Sidwell's tackle on Chris Armstrong had been the worst of the game. Fortunately for me, the referee heard exactly what was said and confirmed that." Downes was charged with improper conduct for his role in the affray.

On 14 May 2009, the club announced that they would not renew his and Kevin Dillon's contract after Reading failed to bounce back to the Premier League at the first attempt after getting knocked out of the play-offs by Burnley 3–0 on aggregate and the departure of Steve Coppell. This was officially announced on the day of Steve Coppell's press conference.

=== Southampton ===
On 7 September 2009, Downes was appointed to a position within the backroom staff of League 1 club, Southampton. He was dismissed along with Alan Pardew on 30 August 2010.

=== West Ham United ===
For a few weeks in October and November 2010 Downes was hired as a part-time defensive coach for League Two side Gillingham. Then on 24 November 2010, Downes was appointed as a defensive coach at West Ham United under manager Avram Grant. His appointment came a day after the West Ham board sacked assistant manager Zeljko Petrovic. In May 2011, shortly after West Ham were relegated from the Premier League, Grant was sacked however Downes kept his job and was named first team coach when new manager Sam Allardyce took over. On 11 December 2012 Downes' departure from his role with West Ham United was announced. He went on to spend some time working under Harry Redknapp at Queens Park Rangers.

=== India ===
Prior to the 2017–18 Indian Super League season, Downes joined Steve Coppell at Jamshedpur. He subsequently coached at other Indian clubs, Kerala Blasters and ATK.

== Managerial career ==
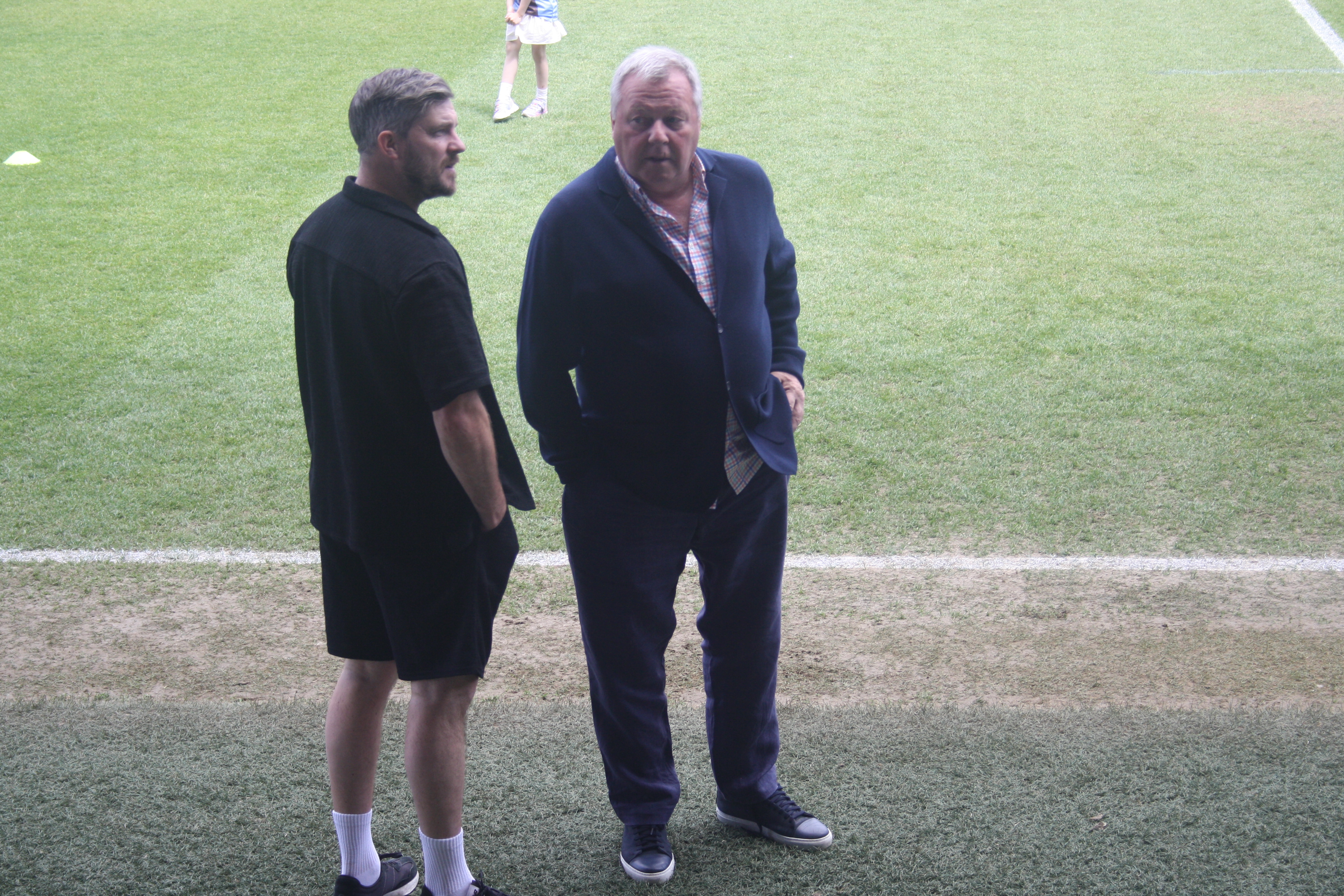
Downes with Jon Main in 2025

=== Brentford ===
Downes left Crystal Palace in 2000 and joined Brentford as assistant manager. After Ron Noades stepped down as manager, he carried on in the role under Ray Lewington and Steve Coppell. When Coppell left Brentford in June 2002, Downes was appointed manager. He had an unbeaten start to his reign in August 2002, winning the Division Two Manager of the Month award. Downes led the club to 16th position in the Second Division in 2002–03, but was sacked in March 2004 after a run of poor results and the club near the bottom of the table and facing relegation.

=== AFC Wimbledon ===
On 4 December 2018, Downes took over after Neal Ardley had left the club by mutual consent. His assistant manager was fellow former Wimbledon FC midfielder Glyn Hodges. When Downes was appointed, Wimbledon were six points from avoiding relegation from League One. They had slipped further behind to be nine points below 20th place in early March. Under Downes they won 21 points from their last 12 matches and successfully avoided relegation on the final day of the season.

On 25 September 2019 he was suspended from his duties by the club after being charged by the FA for misconduct under FA Rule E1(b), in respect of eight small bets placed on various football matches in a period between 30 November 2013 and 12 July 2019. In October, the FA issued Downes with a fine of £3,000 and banned him from football for four weeks after he admitted the offences. Two days later, he and the club parted company.

=== Lions Gibraltar ===
On 25 July 2025, Downes was appointed manager of Lions Gibraltar in the Gibraltar Football League.

== Managerial statistics ==
As of match played 6 December 2025

Managerial record by team and tenure
Team	From	To	Record				
Team	From	To	P	W	D	L	Win %
Brentford	28 June 2002	14 March 2004	97	29	22	46	29.9
AFC Wimbledon	4 December 2018	20 October 2019	42	11	13	18	26.2
Lions Gibraltar	25 July 2025		14	8	1	5	57.1
Total			153	48	36	69	31.4

== Honours ==
=== As a player ===
Wimbledon

- Football League Fourth Division: 1982–83
- Football League Group Cup runner-up: 1981–82

=== As a manager ===
Individual

- Football League Second Division Manager of the Month: August 2002
