= Stephen Evans (footballer) =

Welsh footballer (born 1980)

Personal information
- Full name: Stephen James Evans
- Date of birth: 25 September 1980 (age 46)
- Place of birth: Caerphilly, Wales
- Height: 6 ft 1 in (1.85 m)
- Position: Defender

Youth career
- –1998: Crystal Palace

Senior career*
Years	Team	Apps	(Gls)
1998–2002	Crystal Palace	6	(0)
2001	→ Swansea City (loan)	6	(0)
2002–2004	Brentford	48	(5)
2004–2007	Woking	84	(9)
2007–2008	Crawley Town	29	(2)
2009–2010	Llanelli	7	(1)
2010–2011	Carmarthen Town	20	(0)

International career
1998	Wales U18	1	(0)
2000–2001	Wales U21	2	(0)
- * Club domestic league appearances and goals

Stephen James Evans (born 25 September 1980) is a Welsh football midfielder who last played for Welsh Premier League side Carmarthen Town.

Stephen retired from professional football in 2011, and explored other career paths.

== Club career ==
Evans began his career as a trainee with Crystal Palace, turning professional in August 1998. He had previously had trials with Norwich City and Cardiff City before being signed by Palace. Evans' league debut came for Palace on 6 February 1999 when he was a late substitute, for Leon McKenzie in a 1–1 draw at home to Birmingham City. He made four further substitute appearances later that season. The following season he played just twice, against Crewe Alexandra in the league and against Colchester United in the League Cup.

He missed most of the 2000–01 season through injury, returning for the final game of the season as a late substitute for Wayne Carlisle in a 4–2 win away to Portsmouth. Evans joined Swansea City on loan in November 2001, playing six times in the league and twice in the FA Cup. He returned to Crystal Palace, but was allowed to join Brentford on a free transfer in March 2002. He was released by Brentford in May 2004.

He joined Working F.C. in August 2004 after a successful trial, leaving to join Crawley Town in January 2007. He struggled to establish himself at Crawley, particularly after his namesake, the manager Steve Evans took over and joined Llanelli in January 2008. He went on to score twice in 7 appearances that season and also played in Llanelli's Welsh Cup final defeat to Bangor City.

2008–09 started with Steve's European debut, winning a throw in that led to Llanelli's winning goal against Ventspils in the Champions league, the Reds however lost the away leg 4–0 to crash out on aggregate. He played a key part in Llanelli's season, netting 7 goals in 30 appearances but left the club in June 2009 following the departure of manager Peter Nicholas. However, he returned to the club in November 2009 and made seven appearances during the 2009–10 season before leaving the club for a second time in June 2010, joining Carmarthen Town.

== International career ==
Evans was capped by Wales at U18 and U21 level.

== Personal life ==
Evans is a lifelong Liverpool supporter
