= 2001–02 Brentford F.C. season =

English football team season

Brentford
2001–02 season
- Chairman: Ron Noades
- Manager: Steve Coppell
- Stadium: Griffin Park
- Second Division: 3rd
- Play-offs: Runners-up
- FA Cup: Second round
- League Cup: Second round
- Football League Trophy: First round
- Top goalscorer: League: Owusu (20); All: Owusu (22)
- Highest home attendance: 11,303
- Lowest home attendance: 4,026
- Average home league attendance: 6,714
Home colours	Away colours

During the 2001–02 English football season, Brentford competed in the Football League Second Division. The Bees were denied promotion after defeat to Stoke City in the 2002 Second Division playoff Final.

== Season summary ==
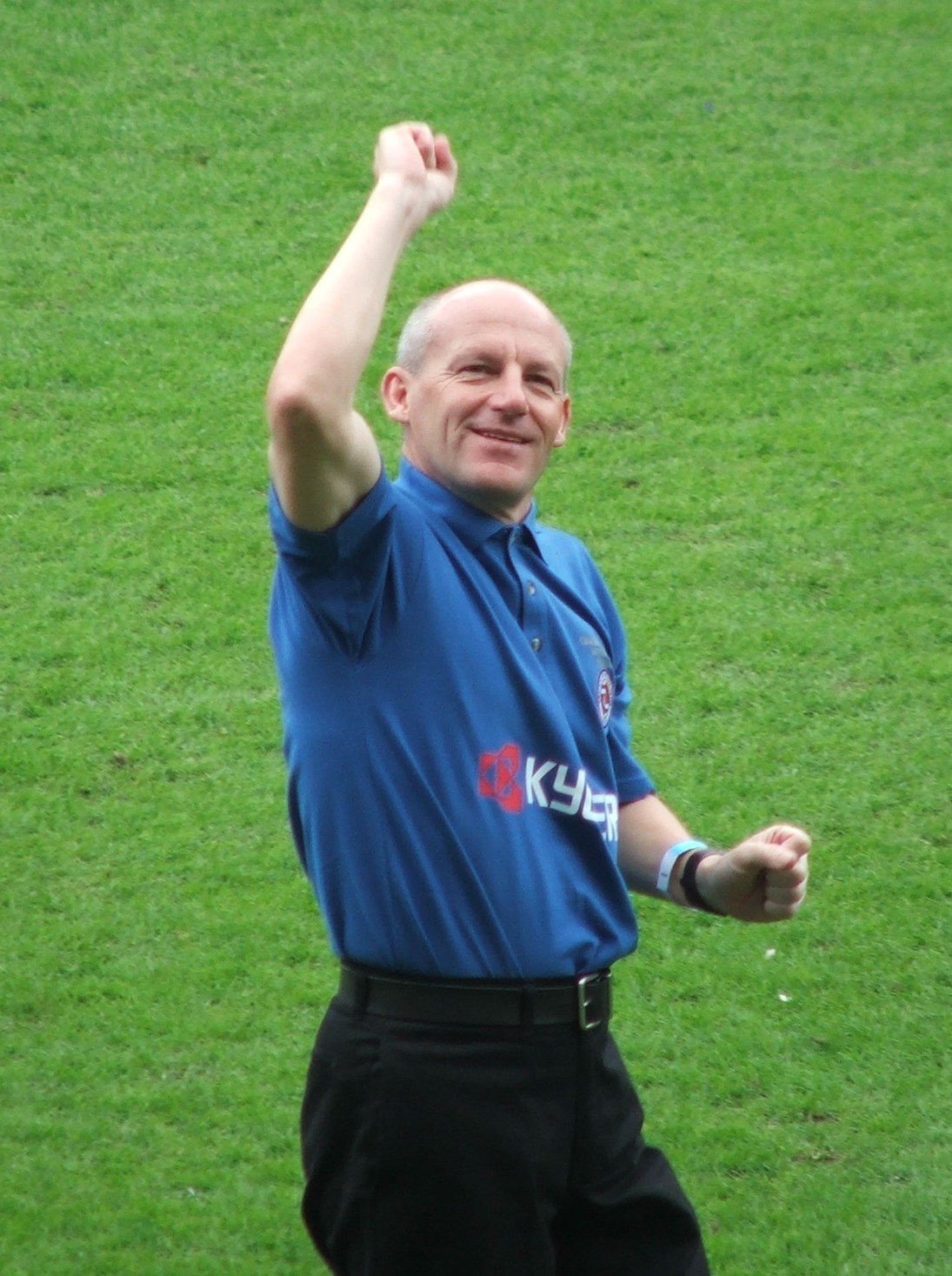
2001–02 was Steve Coppell's lone season as Brentford manager.

After a promising, but ultimately disappointing 2000–01 season, Steve Coppell replaced Ray Lewington as manager of Second Division Brentford on 8 May 2001. In the knowledge he would be provided with little money to buy players, Coppell was also tasked with raising £500,000 in transfer fees. The previous season's squad was kept together, with two fringe players released and two arrivals – youngster Stephen Hunt and defender Jason Price on a short-term contract. After a 1–1 opening day draw with Wigan Athletic, teenage Blackburn Rovers forward Ben Burgess was brought in on a one-month loan, which was subsequently extended until the end of the season.

Brentford had its best start to a season since 1934–35 and topped the table for the first time after a 4–0 win over Tranmere Rovers on 8 September 2001. After a first league defeat of the season at the hands of Swindon Town on 25 September, the Bees went on a seven-match club record-equalling winning run and seized top spot in the Second Division. Captain Paul Evans led by example, scoring 9 goals in 13 matches in all competitions before suffering a hamstring injury in mid-October. His temporary replacement was Arsenal's teenage midfielder Steve Sidwell, another loan signing which would prove to be a master-stroke and which would later be extended until the end of the season. Between 10 November 2001 and 24 January 2002, Brentford won just twice in a spell of 13 league matches, suffering eight defeats, while briefly returning to the top of the table in late December. By 21 December, Lloyd Owusu, Paul Evans and Ben Burgess had each reached 10 or more goals for the season, which was the fourth instance of three Brentford players reaching double-figures before Christmas Day.

A 4–0 victory over Brighton & Hove Albion in front of the Sky cameras at Griffin Park on 24 January 2002 turned Brentford's flagging season around, with twin forwards Owusu and Burgess finding the net with regularity. The Bees lost just two of the next 16 matches, but a 0–0 draw away to West London rivals Queens Park Rangers in the penultimate match of the season dropped the club out of the final automatic promotion place. Cause for concern was a goal drought suffered by Ben Burgess, who had failed to score since 26 February and the midfield was weakened by the £150,000 sale of Gavin Mahon to Watford, in a bid to reduce the wage bill. Brentford would play 2nd-place Reading at Griffin Park on the final day of the season, needing a win to secure automatic promotion, while the Royals only needed a draw. Brentford took the lead through Martin Rowlands, but were pegged back 13 minutes from time by Jamie Cureton and the match finished as a 1–1 draw, which consigned the Bees to the playoffs.

Brentford faced 6th-placed Huddersfield Town in the playoff semi-finals, a rematch of the 1995 semi-final encounter between the two sides. The Bees held the Terriers to a 0–0 draw at the McAlpine Stadium and reached the 2002 Second Division playoff Final courtesy of goals from Darren Powell and Lloyd Owusu to emerge 2–1 victors in the second leg. In the final versus Stoke City, Brentford "simply had no sting in their tail" and were defeated 2–0.

== League table ==
Pos	Team	Pld	W	D	L	GF	GA	GD	Pts	Promotion or relegation
1	Brighton & Hove Albion (C, P)	46	25	15	6	66	42	+24	90	Promotion to Football League First Division
2	Reading (P)	46	23	15	8	70	43	+27	84	Promotion to Football League First Division
3	Brentford	46	24	11	11	77	43	+34	83	Qualification for the Second Division play-offs
4	Cardiff City	46	23	14	9	75	50	+25	83	Qualification for the Second Division play-offs
5	Stoke City (O, P)	46	23	11	12	67	40	+27	80	Qualification for the Second Division play-offs

Rules for classification: In the Football League goals scored (GF) takes precedence over goal difference (GD).
(C) Champions; (O) Play-off winners; (P) Promoted

== Results ==
Brentford's goal tally listed first.

=== Legend ===
Win	Draw	Loss

=== Pre-season ===
Date	Opponent	Venue	Result	Attendance	Scorer(s)
13 July 2001	Sutton United	A	0–0	652	
17 July 2001	Hampton & Richmond Borough	A	2–0	n/a	Abbey (2)
20 July 2001	Woking	A	3–1	785	O'Connor, Evans, (og)
24 July 2001	India	H	3–0	3,634	Owusu (2), Evans
28 July 2001	Coventry City	H	0–0	n/a	
1 August 2001	Portsmouth	H	2–2	1,361	Hutchinson, Powell
3 August 2001	Wimbledon	H	0–4	1,550	
6 August 2001	Chertsey Town	A	6–0	n/a	Hutchinson, Charles (2), Geddes (2), Tabb (pen)

=== Football League Second Division ===
No.	Date	Opponent	Venue	Result	Attendance	Scorer(s)
1	11 August 2001	Wigan Athletic	A	1–1	5,925	Ingimarsson
2	18 August 2001	Port Vale	H	2–0	4,561	Evans, Burgess
3	25 August 2001	Chesterfield	A	1–0	3,571	Evans
4	27 August 2001	Cambridge United	H	2–1	4,674	Evans (2)
5	8 September 2001	Tranmere Rovers	H	4–0	5,211	Owusu, Burgess, Evans, Williams
6	15 September 2001	Notts County	A	0–0	5,043	
7	18 September 2001	Bristol City	H	2–2	6,432	Burgess, Powell
8	22 September 2001	Oldham Athletic	H	2–2	5,522	Owusu, Evans
9	25 September 2001	Swindon Town	A	0–2	5,519	
10	29 September 2001	Colchester United	H	4–1	5,179	Evans (2), Burgess, Owusu
11	5 October 2001	Brighton & Hove Albion	A	2–1	6,823	Rowlands, Ingimarsson
12	13 October 2001	Peterborough United	H	2–1	11,097	Owusu, Evans
13	13 October 2001	Bournemouth	A	2–0	3,934	Hunt (2)
14	23 October 2001	Bury	H	5–1	5,389	Owusu (2), Gibbs (2), Burgess
15	27 October 2001	Reading	A	2–1	14,680	Ingimarsson, Price
16	3 November 2001	Blackpool	H	2–0	7,605	Sidwell, Owusu
17	10 November 2001	Stoke City	A	2–3	17,953	Burgess, Owusu
18	20 November 2001	Huddersfield Town	A	1–1	8,513	Burgess
19	24 November 2001	Queens Park Rangers	H	0–0	10,849	
20	1 December 2001	Wycombe Wanderers	A	3–5	8,013	Owusu, Evans, Burgess
21	4 December 2001	Cardiff City	A	1–3	10,184	Evans
22	15 December 2001	Wrexham	H	3–0	5,326	Ingimarsson, Hunt, Burgess
23	21 December 2001	Northampton Town	H	3–0	5,142	Evans, Owusu, Burgess
24	26 December 2001	Cambridge United	A	1–2	3,989	Burgess
25	29 December 2001	Tranmere Rovers	A	0–1	9,389	
26	12 January 2002	Port Vale	A	1–2	4,588	Owusu
27	19 January 2002	Wigan Athletic	H	0–1	5,549	
28	22 January 2002	Northampton Town	A	0–1	4,184	
29	24 January 2002	Brighton & Hove Albion	H	4–0	7,475	Ingimarsson, Burgess (2), Sidwell
30	2 February 2002	Colchester United	A	1–1	3,657	Owusu
31	9 February 2002	Bournemouth	H	1–0	6,698	Owusu
32	12 February 2002	Cardiff City	H	2–1	6,718	Hunt, Burgess
33	16 February 2002	Peterborough United	A	1–1	5,100	Owusu
34	22 February 2002	Notts County	H	2–1	5,367	Evans, Burgess
35	26 February 2002	Oldham Athletic	A	2–3	4,935	Burgess (2)
36	2 March 2002	Bristol City	A	2–0	11,421	Owusu, Rowlands
37	5 March 2002	Swindon Town	H	2–0	5,644	Owusu (2)
38	9 March 2002	Wrexham	A	3–0	3,343	Evans (2), Rowlands
39	12 March 2002	Chesterfield	H	0–0	5,372	
40	16 March 2002	Wycombe Wanderers	H	1–0	7,165	Ingimarsson
41	19 March 2002	Blackpool	A	3–1	4,865	Rowlands, Owusu (2)
42	30 March 2002	Stoke City	H	1–0	8,837	Sidwell
43	1 April 2002	Bury	A	0–2	4,332	
44	6 April 2002	Huddersfield Town	H	3–0	7,393	Owusu, Sidwell, Rowlands
45	13 April 2002	Queens Park Rangers	A	0–0	18,346	
46	20 April 2002	Reading	H	1–1	11,303	Rowlands

=== Football League Second Division play-offs ===
No.	Date	Opponent	Venue	Result	Attendance	Scorer(s)	Notes
SF (1st leg)	28 April 2002	Huddersfield Town	A	0–0	16,523		
SF (2nd leg)	1 May 2002	Huddersfield Town	H	2–1 (won 2–1 on aggregate)	11,191	Owusu, Powell	
Final	11 May 2002	Stoke City	N	0–2	42,523		(Note: Match played at Millennium Stadium, Cardiff.)

=== FA Cup ===
No.	Date	Opponent	Venue	Result	Attendance	Scorer(s)
R1	17 November 2001	Morecambe	H	1–0	4,026	Gibbs
R2	8 December 2001	Scunthorpe United	A	2–3	3,457	Dobson, Burgess

=== Football League Cup ===
No.	Date	Opponent	Venue	Result	Attendance	Scorer(s)
R1	21 August 2001	Norwich City	H	1–0	4,111	O'Connor
R2	12 September 2001	Newcastle United	A	1–4	25,633	Owusu

=== Football League Trophy ===
No.	Date	Opponent	Venue	Result	Attendance
SR1	17 October 2001	Wycombe Wanderers	A	0–1	2,051

- Sources: Soccerbase, 11v11

== Playing squad ==
Players' ages are as of the opening day of the 2001–02 season.

No	Position	Name	Nationality	Date of birth (age)	Signed from	Signed in	Notes
Goalkeepers
1	GK	Ólafur Gottskálksson	(Iceland)	12 March 1968 (aged 33)	Hibernian	2000	
13	GK	Paul Smith	(England)	17 December 1979 (aged 21)	Carshalton Athletic	2000	
25	GK	Alan Julian	(Northern Ireland)	11 March 1983 (aged 18)	Youth	2001	
Defenders
2	DF	Danny Boxall	(Republic of Ireland)	24 August 1977 (aged 23)	Crystal Palace	1998	
3	DF	Ijah Anderson	(England)	30 December 1975 (aged 25)	Southend United	1995	
4	DF	Ívar Ingimarsson	(Iceland)	20 August 1977 (aged 23)	ÍBV	1999	
5	DF	Darren Powell	(England)	10 March 1976 (aged 25)	Hampton	1998	
6	DF	Scott Marshall	(Scotland)	1 May 1973 (aged 28)	Southampton	1999	
12	DF	Michael Dobson	(England)	9 April 1981 (aged 20)	Youth	2000	
15	DF	Jay Lovett	(England)	22 January 1978 (aged 23)	Crawley Town	2000	
23	DF	David Theobald	(England)	15 December 1978 (aged 22)	Ipswich Town	1999	
26	DF	Lee Fieldwick	(England)	1 January 1982 (aged 19)	Youth	2000	
27	DF	Matt Somner	(Wales)	8 December 1982 (aged 18)	Youth	2001	
Midfielders
7	MF	Paul Evans (c)	(Wales)	1 September 1974 (aged 26)	Shrewsbury Town	1999	
11	MF	Martin Rowlands	(Republic of Ireland)	8 February 1979 (aged 22)	Farnborough Town	1998	
18	MF	Eddie Hutchinson	(England)	23 February 1982 (aged 19)	Sutton United	2000	
20	MF	Kevin O'Connor	(Republic of Ireland)	24 February 1982 (aged 19)	Youth	2000	
21	MF	Mark Williams	(England)	19 October 1981 (aged 19)	Youth	2000	
22	MF	Jay Smith	(England)	29 December 1981 (aged 19)	Youth	2001	
28	MF	Stephen Hunt	(Republic of Ireland)	1 August 1981 (aged 20)	Crystal Palace	2001	
31	MF	Jay Tabb	(Republic of Ireland)	21 February 1984 (aged 17)	Crystal Palace	2000	
32	MF	Steve Sidwell	(England)	14 December 1982 (aged 18)	Arsenal	2001	On loan from Arsenal
34	MF	Stephen Evans	(Wales)	25 September 1980 (aged 20)	Crystal Palace	2002	
Forwards
9	FW	Lloyd Owusu	(Ghana)	12 November 1976 (aged 24)	Slough Town	1998	
17	FW	Mark McCammon	(Barbados)	7 August 1978 (aged 23)	Charlton Athletic	2000	
24	FW	Julian Charles	(Saint Vincent and the Grenadines)	5 February 1977 (aged 24)	Hampton & Richmond Borough	1999	
30	FW	Ben Burgess	(Republic of Ireland)	9 November 1981 (aged 19)	Blackburn Rovers	2001	On loan from Blackburn Rovers
33	FW	Mark Peters	(England)	4 October 1983 (aged 17)	Southampton	2002	
Players who left the club mid-season
8	MF	Gavin Mahon	(England)	2 January 1977 (aged 24)	Hereford United	1998	Transferred to Watford
10	FW	Scott Partridge	(England)	13 October 1974 (aged 26)	Torquay United	1999	Transferred to Rushden & Diamonds
14	MF	Tony Folan	(Republic of Ireland)	18 September 1978 (aged 22)	Crystal Palace	1998	Released
16	MF	Derek Bryan	(England)	11 November 1974 (aged 26)	Hampton	1997	Released
19	DF	Paul Gibbs	(England)	26 October 1972 (aged 28)	Plymouth Argyle	2000	Transferred to Barnsley
29	DF	Jason Price	(Wales)	12 April 1977 (aged 24)	Swansea City	2001	Released
~~32~~	FW	Adrian Caceres	(Australia)	10 January 1982 (aged 19)	Southampton	2001	Returned to Southampton after loan

- Source: Soccerbase

== Coaching staff ==
Name	Role
(England) Steve Coppell	Manager
(England) Wally Downes	Assistant coach
(England) Roberto Forzoni	Assistant coach
(England) Jim Stannard	Goalkeeping coach
(England) Phil McLoughlin	Physiotherapist
(England) Colin Martin	Medical Officer
(England) John Griffin	Chief scout

== Statistics ==
=== Appearances and goals ===
Substitute appearances in brackets.

No	Pos	Nat	Name	League		FA Cup		League Cup		FL Trophy		Playoffs		Total	
No	Pos	Nat	Name	Apps	Goals	Apps	Goals	Apps	Goals	Apps	Goals	Apps	Goals	Apps	Goals
1	GK	(Iceland)	Ólafur Gottskálksson	28	0	2	0	2	0	0	0	0	0	32	0
2	DF	(England)	Danny Boxall	0 (5)	0	0	0	0	0	0	0	0 (1)	0	0 (6)	0
3	DF	(England)	Ijah Anderson	33 (2)	0	1	0	2	0	1	0	3	0	40 (2)	0
4	DF	(Iceland)	Ívar Ingimarsson	46	6	2	0	2	0	1	0	3	0	54	6
5	DF	(England)	Darren Powell	41	1	2	0	2	0	0	0	3	1	48	2
7	MF	(Wales)	Paul Evans	40	14	1	0	2	0	1	0	3	0	47	14
8	MF	(England)	Gavin Mahon	34 (1)	0	2	0	2	0	0	0	—		38 (1)	0
9	FW	(Ghana)	Lloyd Owusu	43 (1)	20	2	0	1	1	1	0	3	1	50 (1)	22
10	FW	(England)	Scott Partridge	0 (1)	0	—		0 (1)	0	—		—		0 (2)	0
11	MF	(Republic of Ireland)	Martin Rowlands	13 (10)	7	0 (1)	0	0 (1)	0	0	0	3	0	16 (12)	7
12	DF	(England)	Michael Dobson	38 (1)	0	2	1	2	0	0	0	3	0	45 (1)	1
13	GK	(England)	Paul Smith	18	0	0	0	0	0	1	0	3	0	22	0
15	DF	(England)	Jay Lovett	2	0	—		0	0	0	0	0	0	2	0
16	MF	(England)	Derek Bryan	0 (1)	0	0	0	0	0	0	0	—		0 (1)	0
17	FW	(Barbados)	Mark McCammon	1 (13)	0	0 (1)	0	0	0	0	0	0 (1)	0	1 (15)	0
18	MF	(England)	Eddie Hutchinson	2 (6)	0	0 (1)	0	0	0	1	0	0	0	3 (7)	0
19	DF	(England)	Paul Gibbs	23 (4)	2	2	1	2	0	0 (1)	0	—		27 (5)	3
20	MF	(Republic of Ireland)	Kevin O'Connor	13 (12)	0	1 (1)	0	1 (1)	0	1	0	0 (2)	0	16 (16)	0
21	MF	(England)	Mark Williams	0 (20)	1	0 (1)	0	0 (1)	0	0 (1)	0	0	0	0 (23)	1
22	MF	(England)	Jay Smith	0	0	0	0	0	0	0 (1)	0	0	0	0 (1)	0
23	DF	(England)	David Theobald	5 (1)	0	0	0	0	0	1	0	0	0	6 (1)	0
28	MF	(Republic of Ireland)	Stephen Hunt	34 (1)	4	1	0	0 (1)	0	1	0	3	0	39 (2)	4
29	DF	(Wales)	Jason Price	15	1	—		2	0	1	0	—		18	1
31	MF	(Republic of Ireland)	Jay Tabb	0 (3)	0	0	0	0	0	0	0	0	0	0 (3)	0
Players loaned in during the season
30	FW	(Republic of Ireland)	Ben Burgess	43	17	2	1	2	0	1	0	3	0	51	18
~~32~~	FW	(Australia)	Adrian Caceres	5	0	—		0	0	—		—		5	0
32	MF	(England)	Steve Sidwell	29 (1)	4	2	0	—		—		3	0	34 (1)	4

- Players listed in italics left the club mid-season.
- Source: Soccerbase

=== Goalscorers ===
No	Pos	Nat	Player	FL2	FAC	FLC	FLT	FLP	Total
9	FW	(Ghana)	Lloyd Owusu	20	0	1	0	1	22
30	FW	(Republic of Ireland)	Ben Burgess	17	1	0	0	0	18
7	MF	(Wales)	Paul Evans	14	0	0	0	0	14
11	MF	(Republic of Ireland)	Martin Rowlands	7	0	0	0	0	7
4	DF	(Iceland)	Ívar Ingimarsson	6	0	0	0	0	6
32	MF	(England)	Steve Sidwell	4	0	—	—	0	4
28	MF	(Republic of Ireland)	Stephen Hunt	4	0	0	0	0	4
19	DF	(England)	Paul Gibbs	2	1	0	0	—	3
5	DF	(England)	Darren Powell	1	0	0	0	1	2
29	DF	(Wales)	Jason Price	1	—	0	0	—	1
21	MF	(England)	Mark Williams	1	0	0	0	0	1
12	DF	(England)	Michael Dobson	0	1	0	0	0	1
Total				77	2	1	0	2	82

- Players listed in italics left the club mid-season.
- Source: Soccerbase

=== Discipline ===
No	Pos	Nat	Player	FL2		FAC		FLC		FLT		FLP		Total		Pts
No	Pos	Nat	Player	Booked	Sent off (straight red)	Booked	Sent off (straight red)	Booked	Sent off (straight red)	Booked	Sent off (straight red)	Booked	Sent off (straight red)	Booked	Sent off (straight red)	Pts
19	DF	(England)	Paul Gibbs	8	1	2	0	0	0	0	0	—		10	1	13
3	DF	(England)	Ijah Anderson	9	1	0	0	0	0	0	0	0	0	9	1	12
5	DF	(England)	Darren Powell	7	0	1	0	1	0	0	0	1	0	9	0	9
32	MF	(England)	Steve Sidwell	7	0	1	0	—		—		1	0	9	0	9
11	MF	(Republic of Ireland)	Martin Rowlands	5	1	0	0	0	0	0	0	0	0	5	1	8
28	MF	(Republic of Ireland)	Stephen Hunt	4	1	0	0	0	0	1	0	0	0	5	1	8
7	MF	(Wales)	Paul Evans	4	0	0	0	1	0	0	0	1	0	6	0	6
29	DF	(Wales)	Jason Price	4	0	—		1	0	0	0	—		5	0	5
30	FW	(Republic of Ireland)	Ben Burgess	3	0	0	0	0	0	0	0	0	0	3	0	3
12	DF	(England)	Michael Dobson	3	0	0	0	0	0	0	0	0	0	3	0	3
8	MF	(England)	Gavin Mahon	2	0	0	0	1	0	0	0	—		3	0	3
17	FW	(Barbados)	Mark McCammon	2	0	0	0	0	0	0	0	0	0	2	0	2
18	MF	(England)	Eddie Hutchinson	1	0	0	0	0	0	0	0	0	0	1	0	1
20	MF	(Republic of Ireland)	Kevin O'Connor	1	0	0	0	0	0	0	0	0	0	1	0	1
9	FW	(Ghana)	Lloyd Owusu	1	0	0	0	0	0	0	0	0	0	1	0	1
23	DF	(England)	David Theobald	1	0	0	0	0	0	0	0	0	0	1	0	1
21	MF	(England)	Mark Williams	1	0	0	0	0	0	0	0	0	0	1	0	1
Total				63	4	4	0	4	0	1	0	3	0	75	4	87

- Players listed in italics left the club mid-season.
- Source: ESPN FC

=== International caps ===
No	Pos	Nat	Player	Caps	Goals	Ref
4	DF	(Iceland)	Ívar Ingimarsson	2	0	
7	MF	(Wales)	Paul Evans	1	0	

=== Management ===
Name	Nat	From	To	Record All Comps					Record League				
Name	Nat	From	To	P	W	D	L	W %	P	W	D	L	W %
Steve Coppell	(England)	11 August 2001	11 May 2002	54	27	12	15	50.00|	46	24	11	11	52.17

=== Summary ===
Games played	54 (46 Second Division, 2 FA Cup, 2 League Cup, 1 Football League Trophy, 3 Football League playoffs)
Games won	27 (24 Second Division, 1 FA Cup, 1 League Cup, 0 Football League Trophy, 1 Football League playoffs)
Games drawn	12 (11 Second Division, 0 FA Cup, 0 League Cup, 0 Football League Trophy, 1 Football League playoffs)
Games lost	15 (11 Second Division, 1 FA Cup, 1 League Cup, 1 Football League Trophy, 1 Football League playoffs)
Goals scored	82 (77 Second Division, 2 FA Cup, 1 League Cup, 0 Football League Trophy, 2 Football League playoffs)
Goals conceded	54 (43 Second Division, 3 FA Cup, 4 League Cup, 1 Football League Trophy, 3 Football League playoffs)
Clean sheets	22 (19 Second Division, 1 FA Cup, 1 League Cup, 0 Football League Trophy, 1 Football League playoffs)
Biggest league win	4–0 on two occasions; 5–1 versus Bury, 23 October 2001
Worst league defeat	2–0 on two occasions; 3–1 versus Cardiff City, 4 December 2001; 5–3 versus Wycombe Wanderers, 1 December 2001
Most appearances	54, Ívar Ingimarsson (46 Second Division, 2 FA Cup, 2 League Cup, 1 Football League Trophy, 3 Football League playoffs)
Top scorer (league)	20, Lloyd Owusu
Top scorer (all competitions)	22, Lloyd Owusu

== Transfers & loans ==
Players transferred in
Date	Pos.	Name	Previous club	Fee	Ref.
2 August 2001	MF	(Republic of Ireland) Stephen Hunt	(England) Crystal Palace	Free	
2 August 2001	DF	(Wales) Jason Price	(Wales) Swansea City	Free	
20 February 2002	FW	(England) Mark Peters	(England) Southampton	Free	
25 March 2002	MF	(Wales) Stephen Evans	(England) Crystal Palace	Free	
Players loaned in
Date from	Pos.	Name	From	Date to	Ref.
14 August 2001	FW	(Republic of Ireland) Ben Burgess	(England) Blackburn Rovers	End of season	
7 September 2001	FW	(Australia) Adrian Caceres	(England) Southampton	7 October 2001	
22 October 2001	MF	(England) Steve Sidwell	(England) Arsenal	End of season	
Players transferred out
Date	Pos.	Name	Subsequent club	Fee	Ref.
13 September 2001	FW	(England) Scott Partridge	(England) Rushden & Diamonds	Free	
4 November 2001	MF	(Republic of Ireland) Tony Folan	(Republic of Ireland) Bohemians	Free	
4 March 2002	MF	(England) Gavin Mahon	(England) Watford	£150,000	
15 March 2002	DF	(England) Paul Gibbs	(England) Barnsley	Free	
Players loaned out
Date from	Pos.	Name	To	Date to	Ref.
18 October 2001	DF	(England) Jay Lovett	(England) Crawley Town	30 April 2002	
29 October 2001	FW	(Saint Vincent and the Grenadines) Julian Charles	(England) Farnborough Town	30 November 2001	
Players released
Date	Pos.	Name	Subsequent club	Join date	Ref.
3 July 2001	FW	(Italy) Lorenzo Pinamonte	(Italy) Castel di Sangro	4 July 2001	
31 October 2001	DF	(Wales) Jason Price	(England) Tranmere Rovers	8 November 2001	
12 March 2002	MF	(England) Derek Bryan	(England) Gravesend & Northfleet	12 March 2002	
30 June 2002	DF	(England) Danny Boxall	(England) Bristol Rovers	July 2002	
30 June 2002	FW	(Saint Vincent and the Grenadines) Julian Charles	(England) Billericay Town	2002	
30 June 2002	MF	(Wales) Paul Evans	(England) Bradford City	9 August 2002	
30 June 2002	DF	(Iceland) Ívar Ingimarsson	(England) Wolverhampton Wanderers	1 July 2002	
30 June 2002	FW	(Ghana) Lloyd Owusu	(England) Sheffield Wednesday	3 July 2002	
30 June 2002	DF	(England) David Theobald	(Wales) Swansea City	26 July 2002	

== Kit ==
Supplier: Patrick
Sponsor(s): GMB

Home	Away

Source: Brentford F.C.

== Awards ==
- Supporters' Player of the Year: Ívar Ingimarsson
- Football League Second Division Manager of the Month: Steve Coppell (October 2001)
- Football League Second Division PFA Team of the Year: Paul Evans
- Football League Second Division Team of the Year: Paul Evans, Lloyd Owusu
- Football League Goal of the Month: Lloyd Owusu (March 2002)
- Hounslow Chronicle Player of the Month: Lloyd Owusu (December 2001)
