= 2000–01 Brentford F.C. season =

English football team season

Brentford
2000–01 season
- Chairman: Ron Noades
- Manager: Ron Noades (until 20 November 2000); Ray Lewington (from 20 November 2000)
- Stadium: Griffin Park
- Second Division: 14th
- FA Cup: First round
- League Cup: Second round
- Football League Trophy: Runners-up
- Top goalscorer: League: Scott (13); All: Scott (15)
- Highest home attendance: 7,550
- Lowest home attendance: 3,062
- Average home league attendance: 4,644
Home colours	Away colours

During the 2000–01 English football season, Brentford competed in the Football League Second Division. Despite a mid-table season in the league, the club reached the 2001 Football League Trophy Final, which was lost 2–1 to Port Vale.

== Season summary ==
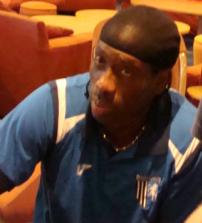
Charlton Athletic forward Mark McCammon was Brentford's major pre-season signing, joining for a £300,000 fee.

After a 1999–2000 season of consolidation back in the Second Division, Brentford chairman-manager Ron Noades spent conservatively in the off-season, acquiring only forward Mark McCammon, midfielder Eddie Hutchinson and defender Jay Lovett for monetary fees. Long-term injuries to full backs Ijah Anderson and Danny Boxall led Noades to sign Paul Gibbs (on a free transfer from Plymouth Argyle) and a number of loanees to defensive cover. There was also change in the goalkeeping department, with Ólafur Gottskálksson and youngster Paul Smith coming in to replace out-of-favour Andy Woodman and the soon-to-retire Jason Pearcey.

Continuing injuries as the season began prevented a solid starting lineup from being established, with Brentford winning only two of the first 12 matches in all competitions and languishing in lower-mid table. After being knocked out of the League Cup by Premier League club Tottenham Hotspur, the Bees' league form turned around, with Andy Scott moving from the Wing back to his natural forward position and scoring seven goals in the following 9 league matches, though a failure to convert draws into wins led the club to tread water in the league placings. An FA Cup first round home defeat to Conference club Kingstonian in mid-November led Noades to relinquish his position as manager (while remaining as chairman) and hand the reins to his assistant, Ray Lewington, on a caretaker basis. Lewington would later become the permanent manager in March 2001.

Despite the beginnings of a run in the Football League Trophy under Lewington, chairman Noades angered supporters in January 2001 by selling top-scorer Andy Scott and utility man Rob Quinn to divisional rivals Oxford United for a combined £150,000 fee, in a bid to balance the club's books. Despite the sales, Brentford's league position improved and despite just three wins from a 9-match spell in January and February, the club rose to 10th-place in the table. With the Bees seemingly safe from relegation from the Second Division, the attention turned to the Football League Trophy and four wins in a row led to a matchup with Port Vale in the final at the Millennium Stadium on 22 April. Despite taking an early lead through youth prospect Michael Dobson, Brentford were pegged back and defeated 2–1. The fixture pileup caused by postponements and international call-ups took its toll on the team. Just one of the final eight league matches of the season yielded a victory, which included a spell of four matches in eight days to close out the campaign. The Bees finished in 14th-place in the Second Division.

== League table ==
Pos	Team	Pld	W	D	L	GF	GA	GD	Pts
12	Peterborough United	46	15	14	17	61	66	−5	59
13	Wycombe Wanderers	46	15	14	17	46	53	−7	59
14	Brentford	46	14	17	15	56	70	−14	59
15	Oldham Athletic	46	15	13	18	53	65	−12	58
16	Bury	46	16	10	20	45	59	−14	58

Rules for classification: 1) Points; 2) Goal difference; 3) Goals scored

== Results ==
Brentford's goal tally listed first.

=== Legend ===
Win	Draw	Loss

=== Pre-season ===
Date	Opponent	Venue	Result	Attendance	Scorer(s)
15 July 2000	Thame United	A	0–0	517	
19 July 2000	Crawley Town	A	2–1	n/a	Anderson, Partridge
22 July 2000	Queens Park Rangers	H	0–2	n/a	
29 July 2000	Fulham	H	0–2	n/a	
1 August 2000	Woking	A	1–1	n/a	(og)
5 August 2000	Cardiff City	A	1–2	2,258	Scott
8 August 2000	Gillingham	H	4–1	0	Pinamonte (3), Mahon

=== Football League Second Division ===
No.	Date	Opponent	Venue	Result	Attendance	Scorer(s)
1	12 August 2000	Northampton Town	A	1–1	6,379	Ingimarsson
2	19 August 2000	Swansea City	H	0–0	5,036	
3	26 August 2000	Oxford United	A	1–0	4,756	Folan
4	28 August 2000	Bristol Rovers	H	2–6	5,434	Evans (pen), Scott
5	2 September 2000	Wycombe Wanderers	H	0–0	4,699	
6	9 September 2000	Reading	A	0–4	10,222	
7	16 September 2000	Millwall	H	1–1	5,495	Scott
8	23 September 2000	Notts County	A	2–2	4,164	McCammon, Partridge
9	30 September 2000	Bournemouth	H	3–2	4,210	Scott, Pinamonte
10	14 October 2000	Peterborough United	H	1–0	4,479	Scott
11	17 October 2000	Colchester United	H	1–0	3,595	Scott
12	21 October 2000	Luton Town	A	1–3	5,382	Scott
13	24 October 2000	Port Vale	A	1–1	3,338	Owusu
14	28 October 2000	Walsall	H	2–1	4,007	Scott, Evans
15	4 November 2000	Cambridge United	A	1–1	4,083	Scott
16	11 November 2000	Rotherham United	H	0–3	4,544	
17	2 December 2000	Wigan Athletic	H	2–2	4,144	Evans (pen), Scott
18	12 December 2000	Bristol City	A	2–1	8,096	Mahon, Partridge
19	16 December 2000	Wrexham	A	1–2	2,287	Rowlands
20	23 December 2000	Oldham Athletic	H	1–1	5,317	Rowlands
21	26 December 2000	Swindon Town	A	3–2	6,649	Owusu, Scott, Evans (pen)
22	1 January 2001	Oxford United	H	3–0	5,020	Scott (2), Partridge
23	6 January 2001	Northampton Town	H	1–1	5,361	Owusu
24	13 January 2001	Bristol Rovers	A	0–0	6,933	
25	17 January 2001	Stoke City	A	0–1	9,350	
26	23 January 2001	Bury	A	1–0	2,274	Owusu
27	27 January 2001	Oldham Athletic	A	0–3	4,964	
28	3 February 2001	Wycombe Wanderers	A	0–0	6,604	
29	10 February 2001	Reading	H	1–2	7,550	McCammon
30	16 February 2001	Millwall	A	0–1	10,233	
31	20 February 2001	Bristol City	H	2–1	4,823	O'Connor, Partridge
32	24 February 2001	Notts County	H	3–1	4,366	Evans, Owusu, Partridge
33	3 March 2001	Bournemouth	A	0–2	4,438	
34	6 March 2001	Peterborough United	A	1–1	4,479	Williams
35	10 March 2001	Stoke City	H	2–2	5,518	Williams, Owusu
36	16 March 2001	Colchester United	A	1–3	3,420	Owusu
37	31 March 2001	Wrexham	H	1–0	4,449	Powell
38	7 April 2001	Wigan Athletic	A	3–1	6,502	Gibbs, Owusu, Partridge
39	10 April 2001	Swindon Town	H	0–1	4,180	
40	14 April 2001	Port Vale	H	1–1	3,671	Evans
41	17 April 2001	Walsall	A	2–3	4,540	McCammon, Roper (og)
42	25 April 2001	Cambridge United	H	2–2	3,062	Owusu, Evans
43	28 April 2001	Rotherham United	A	1–2	9,760	Owusu
44	1 May 2001	Swansea City	A	0–6	2,002	
45	3 May 2001	Luton Town	H	2–2	3,287	Partridge, Williams
46	5 May 2001	Bury	H	3–1	4,596	Partridge, Folan, Ingimarsson

=== FA Cup ===
Round	Date	Opponent	Venue	Result	Attendance	Scorer(s)
R1	18 November 2000	Kingstonian	H	1–3	3,809	Pinamonte

=== Football League Cup ===
Round	Date	Opponent	Venue	Result	Attendance	Scorer(s)
R1 (1st leg)	22 August 2000	Bristol City	A	2–2	3,471	Rowlands, McCammon
R1 (2nd leg)	5 September 2000	Bristol City	H	2–1 (won 4–3 on aggregate)	2,310	Scott (2)
R2 (1st leg)	19 September 2000	Tottenham Hotspur	H	0–0	8,580	
R2 (2nd leg)	26 September 2000	Tottenham Hotspur	A	0–2 (lost 2–0 on aggregate)	26,909	

=== Football League Trophy ===
Round	Date	Opponent	Venue	Result	Attendance	Scorer(s)	Notes
SR1	5 December 2000	Oxford United	H	4–1	1,517	Lovett, Partridge (2), Marshall	
SR2	9 January 2001	Brighton & Hove Albion	A	2–2 (a.e.t.), won 4–2 on pens)	2,482	Marshall, McCammon	(Note: Match played at Griffin Park due to the waterlogged condition of Brighton & Hove Albion's Withdean Stadium pitch.)
SQF	30 January 2001	Barnet	A	2–1	1,438	Rowlands, Evans	
SSF	14 February 2001	Swansea City	A	3–2	2,222	Evans (pen), McCammon, Owusu	
SF (1st leg)	13 March 2001	Southend United	A	2–1	5,055	Dobson (2)	
SF (2nd leg)	20 March 2001	Southend United	H	2–1	6,579	Ingimarsson, Owusu	
F	22 April 2001	Port Vale	N	1–2	25,654	Dobson	(Note: Match played at Millennium Stadium, Cardiff.)

- Sources: Soccerbase, 11v11

== Playing squad ==
Players' ages are as of the opening day of the 2000–01 season.

No	Position	Name	Nationality	Date of birth (age)	Signed from	Signed in	Notes
Goalkeepers
13	GK	Alan Julian	(Northern Ireland)	11 March 1983 (aged 17)	Youth	2001	
17	GK	Ólafur Gottskálksson	(Iceland)	12 March 1968 (aged 32)	Hibernian	2000	
31	GK	Paul Smith	(England)	17 December 1979 (aged 20)	Carshalton Athletic	2000	
Defenders
2	DF	Danny Boxall	(Republic of Ireland)	24 August 1977 (aged 22)	Crystal Palace	1998	
3	DF	Ijah Anderson	(England)	30 December 1975 (aged 24)	Southend United	1995	
5	DF	Darren Powell	(England)	10 March 1976 (aged 24)	Hampton	1998	
6	DF	Scott Marshall	(Scotland)	1 May 1973 (aged 27)	Southampton	1999	
15	DF	Ívar Ingimarsson	(Iceland)	20 August 1977 (aged 22)	ÍBV	1999	
19	DF	Paul Gibbs	(England)	26 October 1972 (aged 27)	Plymouth Argyle	2000	
23	DF	David Theobald	(England)	15 December 1978 (aged 21)	Ipswich Town	1999	
25	DF	Michael Dobson	(England)	9 April 1981 (aged 19)	Youth	2000	
32	DF	Jay Lovett	(England)	22 January 1978 (aged 22)	Crawley Town	2000	
33	DF	Matt Somner	(Wales)	8 December 1982 (aged 17)	Youth	2001	
36	DF	Lee Fieldwick	(England)	1 January 1982 (aged 18)	Youth	2000	
Midfielders
7	MF	Paul Evans (c)	(Wales)	1 September 1974 (aged 25)	Shrewsbury Town	1999	
8	MF	Gavin Mahon	(England)	2 January 1977 (aged 23)	Hereford United	1998	
12	MF	Martin Rowlands	(Republic of Ireland)	8 February 1979 (aged 21)	Farnborough Town	1998	
14	MF	Tony Folan	(Republic of Ireland)	18 September 1978 (aged 21)	Crystal Palace	1998	
16	MF	Derek Bryan	(England)	11 November 1974 (aged 25)	Hampton	1997	
18	MF	Gareth Graham	(Northern Ireland)	6 February 1978 (aged 22)	Crystal Palace	1999	
26	MF	Mark Williams	(England)	19 October 1981 (aged 18)	Youth	2000	
27	MF	Jay Smith	(England)	29 December 1981 (aged 18)	Youth	2001	
30	MF	Eddie Hutchinson	(England)	23 February 1982 (aged 18)	Sutton United	2000	
34	MF	Lee Johnson	(England)	7 June 1981 (aged 19)	Brighton & Hove Albion	2001	
35	MF	Jay Tabb	(Republic of Ireland)	21 February 1984 (aged 16)	Crystal Palace	2000	
Forwards
9	FW	Lloyd Owusu	(Ghana)	12 November 1976 (aged 23)	Slough Town	1998	
10	FW	Scott Partridge	(England)	13 October 1974 (aged 25)	Torquay United	1999	
20	FW	Kevin O'Connor	(Republic of Ireland)	24 February 1982 (aged 18)	Youth	2000	
21	FW	Lorenzo Pinamonte	(Italy)	9 May 1978 (aged 22)	Bristol City	2000	Loaned to Leyton Orient
24	FW	Julian Charles	(Saint Vincent and the Grenadines)	5 February 1977 (aged 23)	Hampton & Richmond Borough	1999	
29	FW	Mark McCammon	(Barbados)	7 August 1978 (aged 22)	Charlton Athletic	2000	
Players who left the club mid-season
1	GK	Andy Woodman	(England)	11 August 1971 (aged 29)	Northampton Town	1999	Loaned to Southend United and Colchester United; Transferred to Colchester United
4	DF	Rob Quinn	(Republic of Ireland)	8 November 1976 (aged 23)	Crystal Palace	1998	Transferred to Oxford United
11	FW	Andy Scott	(England)	2 August 1972 (aged 28)	Sheffield United	1997	Transferred to Oxford United
~~13~~	GK	Jason Pearcey	(England)	12 July 1971 (aged 29)	Grimsby Town	1998	Released
22	MF	Richard Kennedy	(Republic of Ireland)	28 August 1978 (aged 21)	Crystal Palace	1999	Released
28	DF	Nevin Saroya	(England)	15 September 1980 (aged 19)	Youth	2000	Released
~~33~~	MF	Jean-Philippe Javary	(France)	10 January 1978 (aged 22)	Raith Rovers	2000	Released
~~34~~	DF	Kevin Austin	(Trinidad and Tobago)	12 February 1973 (aged 27)	Barnsley	2000	Returned to Barnsley after loan expired
~~34~~	DF	Simon Marsh	(England)	29 January 1977 (aged 23)	Birmingham City	2000	Returned to Birmingham City after loan expired
~~35~~	DF	Jason Crowe	(England)	30 September 1978 (aged 21)	Portsmouth	2000	Returned to Portsmouth after loan expired

- Source: Soccerbase

== Coaching staff ==
=== Ron Noades (12 August – 20 November 2000) ===
Name	Role
(England) Ron Noades	Manager
(England) Ray Lewington	First-team coach
(England) Terry Bullivant	Assistant coach
(England) Wally Downes	Assistant coach
(England) Phil McLoughlin	Physiotherapist
(England) Colin Martin	Medical Officer
(England) John Griffin	Chief scout

=== Ray Lewington (20 November 2000 – 5 May 2001) ===
Name	Role
(England) Ray Lewington	Caretaker Manager
(England) Terry Bullivant	Assistant coach
(England) Wally Downes	Assistant coach
(England) Phil McLoughlin	Physiotherapist
(England) Colin Martin	Medical Officer
(England) John Griffin	Chief scout

== Statistics ==
=== Appearances and goals ===
Substitute appearances in brackets.

No	Pos	Nat	Name	League		FA Cup		League Cup		FL Trophy		Total	
No	Pos	Nat	Name	Apps	Goals	Apps	Goals	Apps	Goals	Apps	Goals	Apps	Goals
3	DF	(England)	Ijah Anderson	1	0	0	0	0	0	0	0	1	0
4	DF	(Republic of Ireland)	Rob Quinn	22	0	1	0	4	0	1	0	28	0
5	DF	(England)	Darren Powell	18	1	0	0	0	0	4	0	22	1
6	DF	(Scotland)	Scott Marshall	29	0	1	0	4	0	4	2	38	2
7	MF	(Wales)	Paul Evans	43	7	1	0	4	0	7	2	55	9
8	MF	(England)	Gavin Mahon	40	1	1	0	4	0	6	0	51	1
9	FW	(Ghana)	Lloyd Owusu	24 (8)	10	1	0	1	0	6 (1)	2	32 (9)	12
10	FW	(England)	Scott Partridge	29 (8)	8	1	0	1 (2)	0	6	2	37 (10)	10
11	FW	(England)	Andy Scott	22	13	1	0	3	2	1	0	27	13
12	MF	(Republic of Ireland)	Martin Rowlands	32	2	1	0	3 (1)	1	6	1	41 (1)	4
14	MF	(Republic of Ireland)	Tony Folan	11 (10)	2	0	0	1 (1)	0	0	0	12 (11)	2
15	DF	(Iceland)	Ívar Ingimarsson	42	3	1	0	4	0	6	1	53	4
17	GK	(Iceland)	Ólafur Gottskálksson	45	0	1	0	4	0	7	0	57	0
18	MF	(Northern Ireland)	Gareth Graham	0 (1)	0	0	0	0	0	0	0	0 (1)	0
19	DF	(England)	Paul Gibbs	26 (1)	1	1	0	1	0	6	0	34 (1)	1
20	FW	(Republic of Ireland)	Kevin O'Connor	5 (6)	1	0	0	0	0	0 (1)	0	5 (7)	1
21	FW	(Italy)	Lorenzo Pinamonte	3 (5)	1	0 (1)	1	1	0	0	0	4 (6)	2
22	MF	(Republic of Ireland)	Richard Kennedy	1	0	0	0	0	0	0 (1)	0	1 (1)	0
23	DF	(England)	David Theobald	15	0	0	0	0	0	4	0	19	0
24	FW	(Saint Vincent and the Grenadines)	Julian Charles	4 (6)	0	0	0	0	0	0	0	4 (6)	0
25	DF	(England)	Michael Dobson	23 (3)	0	0	0	0 (1)	0	7	3	30 (4)	3
26	MF	(England)	Mark Williams	6 (24)	2	0 (1)	0	0 (1)	0	0 (2)	0	6 (28)	2
27	MF	(England)	Jay Smith	2 (1)	0	0	0	0	0	0	0	2 (1)	0
29	FW	(Barbados)	Mark McCammon	14 (10)	3	0	0	3	1	2 (4)	2	19 (14)	6
30	MF	(England)	Eddie Hutchinson	5 (2)	0	0	0	0	0	0	0	5 (2)	0
31	GK	(England)	Paul Smith	1 (1)	0	0	0	0	0	0 (1)	0	1 (2)	0
32	DF	(England)	Jay Lovett	21 (4)	0	0	0	0	0	3 (2)	1	24 (6)	1
~~33~~	MF	(France)	Jean-Philippe Javary	4 (2)	0	0	0	2	0	1	0	7 (2)	0
33	DF	(Wales)	Matt Somner	2 (1)	0	0	0	0	0	0	0	2 (1)	0
35	MF	(Republic of Ireland)	Jay Tabb	1 (1)	0	0	0	0	0	0	0	1 (1)	0
	Players loaned in during the season												
~~34~~	DF	(Trinidad and Tobago)	Kevin Austin	3	0	—		—		—		3	0
~~34~~	DF	(England)	Simon Marsh	3 (1)	0	—		2	0	—		5 (1)	0
~~35~~	DF	(England)	Jason Crowe	9	0	—		2	0	—		11	0

- Players listed in italics left the club mid-season.
- Source: Soccerbase

=== Goalscorers ===
No	Pos	Nat	Player	FL2	FAC	FLC	FLT	Total
11	FW	(England)	Andy Scott	13	0	2	0	15
9	FW	(Ghana)	Lloyd Owusu	10	0	0	2	12
10	FW	(England)	Scott Partridge	8	0	0	2	10
7	MF	(Wales)	Paul Evans	7	0	0	2	9
29	FW	(Barbados)	Mark McCammon	3	0	1	2	6
15	DF	(Iceland)	Ívar Ingimarsson	3	0	0	1	4
12	MF	(Republic of Ireland)	Martin Rowlands	2	0	1	1	4
25	DF	(England)	Michael Dobson	0	0	0	3	3
14	MF	(Republic of Ireland)	Tony Folan	2	0	0	0	2
26	MF	(England)	Mark Williams	2	0	0	0	2
21	FW	(Italy)	Lorenzo Pinamonte	1	1	0	0	2
6	DF	(Scotland)	Scott Marshall	0	0	0	2	2
19	DF	(England)	Paul Gibbs	1	0	0	0	1
8	MF	(England)	Gavin Mahon	1	0	0	0	1
20	FW	(Republic of Ireland)	Kevin O'Connor	1	0	0	0	1
5	DF	(England)	Darren Powell	1	0	0	0	1
32	DF	(England)	Jay Lovett	0	0	0	1	1
Opponent				1	0	0	0	1
Total				57	1	4	16	78

- Players listed in italics left the club mid-season.
- Source: Soccerbase

=== Discipline ===
No	Pos	Nat	Player	FL2		FAC		FLC		FLT		Total		Pts
No	Pos	Nat	Player	Booked	Sent off (straight red)	Booked	Sent off (straight red)	Booked	Sent off (straight red)	Booked	Sent off (straight red)	Booked	Sent off (straight red)	Pts
12	MF	(Republic of Ireland)	Martin Rowlands	11	0	0	0	0	0	1	1	12	1	15
5	DF	(England)	Darren Powell	4	1	0	0	0	0	2	1	6	2	12
7	MF	(Wales)	Paul Evans	7	0	0	0	1	0	1	0	9	0	9
8	MF	(England)	Gavin Mahon	6	1	0	0	0	0	0	0	6	1	9
19	DF	(England)	Paul Gibbs	5	0	0	0	0	0	2	0	7	0	7
4	DF	(Republic of Ireland)	Rob Quinn	5	0	0	0	1	0	0	0	6	0	6
6	DF	(Scotland)	Scott Marshall	4	0	0	0	0	0	1	0	5	0	5
21	FW	(Italy)	Lorenzo Pinamonte	4	0	0	0	1	0	0	0	5	0	5
11	FW	(England)	Andy Scott	4	0	0	0	1	0	0	0	5	0	5
9	FW	(Ghana)	Lloyd Owusu	4	0	0	0	0	0	0	0	4	0	4
25	DF	(England)	Michael Dobson	3	0	0	0	0	0	1	0	4	0	4
15	DF	(Iceland)	Ívar Ingimarsson	3	0	0	0	1	0	0	0	4	0	4
~~33~~	MF	(France)	Jean-Philippe Javary	3	0	0	0	1	0	0	0	4	0	4
24	FW	(Saint Vincent and the Grenadines)	Julian Charles	3	0	0	0	0	0	0	0	3	0	3
29	FW	(Barbados)	Mark McCammon	2	0	0	0	0	0	1	0	3	0	3
23	DF	(England)	David Theobald	2	0	0	0	0	0	1	0	3	0	3
32	DF	(England)	Jay Lovett	0	0	0	0	0	0	2	0	2	0	2
~~35~~	DF	(England)	Jason Crowe	1	0	—		0	0	—		1	0	1
~~34~~	DF	(England)	Simon Marsh	1	0	—		0	0	—		1	0	1
17	GK	(Iceland)	Ólafur Gottskálksson	1	0	0	0	0	0	0	0	1	0	1
22	MF	(Republic of Ireland)	Richard Kennedy	1	0	0	0	0	0	0	0	1	0	1
14	MF	(Republic of Ireland)	Tony Folan	0	0	0	0	1	0	0	0	1	0	1
10	FW	(England)	Scott Partridge	0	0	0	0	0	0	1	0	1	0	1
Total				74	2	0	0	7	0	13	2	94	4	106

- Players listed in italics left the club mid-season.
- Source: Soccerbase

=== International caps ===
No	Pos	Nat	Player	Caps	Goals	Ref
15	DF	(Iceland)	Ívar Ingimarsson	1	0	
24	FW	(Saint Vincent and the Grenadines)	Julian Charles	2	0	

=== Management ===
Name	Nat	From	To	Record All Comps					Record League				
Name	Nat	From	To	P	W	D	L	W %	P	W	D	L	W %
Ron Noades	(England)	12 August 2000	20 November 2000	21	6	9	6	28.57|	16	5	7	4	31.25
Ray Lewington	(England)	20 November 2000	5 May 2001	37	14	11	12	37.84|	30	9	10	11	30.00

=== Summary ===
Games played	58 (46 Second Division, 1 FA Cup, 4 League Cup, 7 Football League Trophy)
Games won	20 (14 Second Division, 0 FA Cup, 1 League Cup, 5 Football League Trophy)
Games drawn	20 (17 Second Division, 0 FA Cup, 2 League Cup, 1 Football League Trophy)
Games lost	18 (15 Second Division, 1 FA Cup, 1 League Cup, 1 Football League Trophy)
Goals scored	77 (56 Second Division, 1 FA Cup, 4 League Cup, 16 Football League Trophy)
Goals conceded	88 (70 Second Division, 3 FA Cup, 5 League Cup, 10 Football League Trophy)
Clean sheets	11 (10 Second Division, 0 FA Cup, 1 League Cup, 0 Football League Trophy)
Biggest league win	3–0 versus Oxford United, 1 January 2001
Worst league defeat	6–0 versus Swansea City, 1 May 2001
Most appearances	57, Ólafur Gottskálksson (45 Second Division, 1 FA Cup, 4 League Cup, 7 Football League Trophy)
Top scorer (league)	13, Andy Scott
Top scorer (all competitions)	15, Andy Scott

== Transfers & loans ==
Players transferred in
Date	Pos.	Name	Previous club	Fee	Ref.
10 July 2000	DF	(England) Paul Gibbs	(England) Plymouth Argyle	Free	
10 July 2000	GK	(Iceland) Ólafur Gottskálksson	(Scotland) Hibernian	Free	
14 July 2000	FW	(Barbados) Mark McCammon	(England) Charlton Athletic	£300,000	
21 July 2000	MF	(England) Eddie Hutchinson	(England) Sutton United	£75,0000	
25 July 2000	GK	(England) Paul Smith	(England) Carshalton Athletic	Free	
28 July 2000	DF	(England) Jay Lovett	(England) Crawley Town	£75,000	
18 August 2000	MF	(France) Jean-Philippe Javary	(Scotland) Raith Rovers	£150,000	
15 March 2001	MF	(England) Lee Johnson	(England) Brighton & Hove Albion	Non-contract	
Players loaned in
Date from	Pos.	Name	From	Date to	Ref.
1 September 2000	DF	(England) Simon Marsh	(England) Birmingham City	1 October 2000	
12 September 2000	DF	(England) Jason Crowe	(England) Portsmouth	12 November 2000	
27 October 2000	DF	(Trinidad and Tobago) Kevin Austin	(England) Barnsley	27 November 2000	
Players transferred out
Date	Pos.	Name	Subsequent club	Fee	Ref.
12 January 2001	DF	(Republic of Ireland) Rob Quinn	(England) Oxford United	£75,000	
12 January 2001	FW	(England) Andy Scott	(England) Oxford United	£75,000	
Players loaned out
Date from	Pos.	Name	To	Date to	Ref.
8 August 2000	GK	(England) Andy Woodman	(England) Southend United	4 November 2000	
10 November 2000	GK	(England) Andy Woodman	(England) Colchester United	31 December 2000	
1 February 2001	FW	(Italy) Lorenzo Pinamonte	(England) Leyton Orient	End of season	
Players released
Date	Pos.	Name	Subsequent club	Join date	Ref.
1 October 2000	DF	(England) Nevin Saroya	(England) Grays Athletic	1 October 2000	
11 October 2000	GK	(England) Jason Pearcey	(England) Solihull Borough	1 September 2001	
1 January 2001	GK	(England) Andy Woodman	(England) Colchester United	3 January 2001	
1 March 2001	DF	(France) Jean-Philippe Javary	(England) Plymouth Argyle	1 March 2001	
20 March 2001	MF	(Republic of Ireland) Richard Kennedy	(England) Crawley Town	March 2001	
31 May 2001	MF	(Northern Ireland) Gareth Graham	(England) Woking	18 August 2001	
31 May 2001	MF	(England) Lee Johnson	(England) Yeovil Town	10 July 2001	

== Kit ==
Supplier: Patrick
Sponsor(s): GMB

Home	Away

Source: Brentford F.C.

== Awards ==
- Supporters' Player of the Month:
  - February 2001 – Michael Dobson
  - March 2001 – Gavin Mahon
