= Gavin Mahon =

English footballer (born 1977)

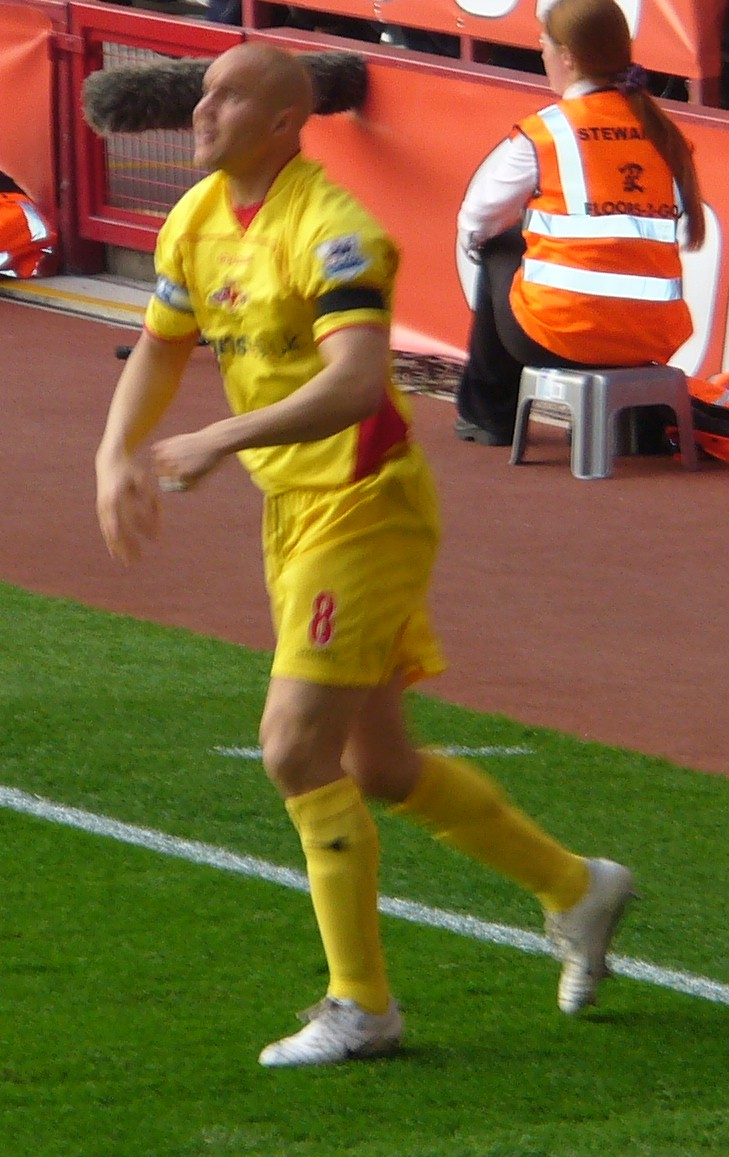
- Mahon playing for Watford

Personal information
- Full name: Gavin Andrew Mahon
- Date of birth: 2 January 1977 (age 49)
- Place of birth: Birmingham, England
- Height: 6 ft 1 in (1.85 m)
- Position: Defensive midfielder

Senior career*
Years	Team	Apps	(Gls)
1995–1996	Wolverhampton Wanderers	0	(0)
1996–1998	Hereford United	69	(4)
1998–2002	Brentford	141	(8)
2002–2008	Watford	189	(6)
2008	→ Queens Park Rangers (loan)	16	(1)
2008–2011	Queens Park Rangers	42	(3)
2011	→ Crystal Palace (loan)	0	(0)
2011–2013	Notts County	43	(0)
2013	→ Stevenage (loan)	9	(0)
2013	Portsmouth	1	(0)
2013–2014	Tamworth	20	(0)
Total		530	(22)
- * Club domestic league appearances and goals

Gavin Andrew Mahon (born 2 January 1977) is an English former professional footballer who played as a defensive midfielder.

Mahon began his career as a trainee at Wolverhampton Wanderers but did not make a first-team appearance. He gained his first experience of senior football at Hereford United, playing regularly for two and a half seasons before signing for Brentford in November 1998 for a fee rising to £130,000. He helped Brentford achieve promotion from Division Three that season and made 166 appearances during his time there. In March 2002, he moved to Watford for £150,000, playing 215 matches across six years and captaining the club to promotion to the Premier League.

He joined Queens Park Rangers ahead of the 2008–09 season having played for the club on loan the previous season. Injuries affected the latter stages of his time at QPR, and he was briefly loaned to Crystal Palace in March 2011, although he did not make an appearance for the club. Mahon signed for Notts County later that year and was loaned to Stevenage in February 2013. He subsequently had brief spells with Portsmouth and Tamworth during the 2013–14 season, the latter being his final club before retirement.

== Playing career ==
=== Early career ===
Mahon began his career with Wolverhampton Wanderers, progressing through the club's youth academy and playing regularly for the youth team. He was released by Wolves at the end of the 1995–96 season, having made no first-team appearances. In July 1996, he signed for Hereford United of Division Three on a free transfer, making his professional debut a 1–0 victory over Doncaster Rovers on 24 August 1996. He scored the first goal of his career later that season in a 3–0 win against Rochdale. Mahon played seven times during the early stages of the season, although did not make any further first-team appearances from November, as Hereford were relegated to the Conference National at the end of the season. He remained at Hereford for the 1997–98 season, playing in all 42 league matches as Hereford finished sixth.

=== Brentford ===
In November 1998, Mahon signed for Division Three club Brentford for a nominal fee of £50,000, which eventually increased to £130,000 under the terms of the agreement. Mahon debuted for Brentford in the club's 2–1 defeat to Leyton Orient at Brisbane Road on 21 November 1998 and played regularly in central midfield. He scored his first goal for Brentford in the club's first match of 1999, scoring the third goal in a 3–1 victory against Barnet at Griffin Park. Brentford were promoted to Division Two as champions in Mahon's first season, winning the league by four points. He made 32 appearances during that season, scoring four goals. The 1999–2000 season marked Mahon's first full season with the west London club; he made 44 appearances in all competitions, scoring three times, as Brentford consolidated their place in Division Two with a mid-table finish.

Mahon played regularly during the 2000–01 season, making 51 appearances across league and cup competitions, as Brentford once again finished in mid-table. He scored once that season, scoring the equaliser in a 2–1 away victory against Bristol City on 12 December 2000. He was also named in the starting line-up for the first competitive final of his career, as Brentford were defeated 2–1 by Port Vale in the Football League Trophy final. Mahon received the first red card of his career that season, sent off in the 83rd minute of a 1–0 home loss to Swindon Town on 11 April 2001. His fourth consecutive season at Brentford started with the team recording an eight-match unbeaten run. He made 39 appearances during the season and was named Brentford's Player of the Year, despite leaving the west London club three months before the end of the season. During his three and a half years at Brentford, Mahon made 166 appearances in all competitions, scoring eight goals.

=== Watford ===
In March 2002, Mahon signed for Division One club Watford for an initial fee of £150,000. The move materialised following a recommendation from Watford reserve team manager Ray Lewington, who had previously signed Mahon at Brentford, to new manager Gianluca Vialli. Vialli subsequently watched Mahon and made him his first signing for the club. Upon joining Watford, Mahon stated: "As soon as I knew Watford were interested I was ready to jump at the chance". He made his Watford debut on 9 March 2002, playing the full 90 minutes in a 2–0 away victory against Crystal Palace. Mahon made a further five appearances for the club during the remainder of the 2001–02 season. Ahead of the 2002–03 season, and following Vialli's dismissal, Mahon was reunited with Lewington, now first-team manager. He was among several players who agreed to a voluntary wage reduction in light of Watford's financial difficulties. Prior to pre-season, the club announced that Mahon would miss the opening months of the season due to a knee injury sustained in May 2002. After regaining fitness with two months of reserve team football, Mahon returned to the first team in the club's 2–1 victory over Burnley at Vicarage Road on 30 November 2002, and went on to make 22 appearances over the course of the season. Five of those appearances came in Watford's FA Cup run, which ended in a 2–1 defeat in the semi-final to Southampton at Villa Park.

Mahon played in the club's opening game of the 2003–04 season, a 1–0 home victory over AFC Bournemouth in the League Cup, and appeared in every match during the first two months of the season. He sustained an injury in a 1–0 away victory against Crewe Alexandra on 4 October 2003, which sidelined him for two months. In January 2004, Mahon scored his first goal for Watford, heading the team into a brief lead against Premier League club Chelsea in the third round of the FA Cup, in an eventual 2–2 draw. Mahon finished the season with three goals in 36 appearances as Watford finished in mid-table. Shortly after the season had finished, he was voted the club's Player of the Season. Two months into the 2004–05 season, Mahon signed a new three-year contract extension on 29 October 2004, keeping him at Watford until 2007. On Mahon signing the new deal, Lewington stated :"I've known Gavin a long time and it doesn't surprise me that he's become a very important part of our squad". He made 51 appearances across all competitions during the season, as Watford avoided relegation by a two-point margin under new manager Aidy Boothroyd, collecting seven points from their final three matches.

Following the departure of former captain Sean Dyche, Mahon was appointed club captain ahead of the 2005–06 season. Mahon scored his first goal of the season in a 3–1 home victory against Burnley on 20 August 2005. Watford reached the play-offs that season, with Mahon playing in all three matches as the club defeated Crystal Palace 3–0 on aggregate in the semi-finals, before securing promotion with a 3–0 win over Leeds United in the final at the Millennium Stadium on 21 May 2006. The victory meant Watford had earned promotion to the Premier League in Mahon's first season as captain, during which he made 43 appearances. He signed a two-year contract extension with the club on 18 July 2006. He subsequently started in the club's opening game of the 2006–07 Premier League season, playing the full match in a 2–1 to Everton at Goodison Park. Mahon made 38 appearances during the season, scoring once with a "fierce volley" in a 4–2 victory against Portsmouth, a goal later nominated for April's Goal of the Month award. Watford were relegated at the end of the season, finishing 20th in the league. The club also reached the FA Cup semi-final that season, losing 4–1 to Manchester United at Villa Park, with Mahon playing in three of Watford's five ties in the competition.

With the club back in the Championship for the 2007–08 season, Mahon continued to play regularly during the first half of the season, making 19 appearances. In December 2007, manager Aidy Boothroyd informed Mahon that he did not feature in his long-term plans, as he intended to build a squad capable of competing in the Premier League. Mahon later stated: "I said to Aidy that I wanted to stay, at least until the end of the season. I wanted to get a second promotion in three years on my CV. Aidy explained his reasons why, and I have no grudges with him for that". Mahon departed Watford with the club top of the Championship table, although they ultimately finished in sixth place. Boothroyd later expressed regret over allowing Mahon to leave "too early". During his five-and-a-half-year spell at Watford, Mahon made 215 appearances and scored seven goals.

=== Queens Park Rangers ===
Mahon subsequently joined Championship rivals Queens Park Rangers on an emergency loan on 31 December 2007, with a view to a permanent transfer at the end of the season. QPR reportedly beat "four or five other Championship sides" to his signature. Watford received an initial transfer fee of £200,000, with a further £50,000 payable in add-ons. Although disappointed to leave Watford, Mahon described his move to QPR as "a very exciting time to be joining", adding that "the ambition and drive of the board and the new investors really impressed me and I'm delighted to be here". He made his debut the following day, coming on as a 67th-minute substitute in the club's 3–1 victory against Leicester City at Loftus Road. Mahon scored his first goal for the club on 12 February 2008, opening the scoring in a match QPR went on to lose 4–2 at home to Burnley. He made 17 appearances during the second half of the season, as QPR finished in 14th place. Mahon signed for the club on a permanent basis at the end of the season.

Under the new management of Iain Dowie, Mahon and QPR began the 2008–09 season with five wins from their opening six matches. Mahon scored his first goal of the season in a 1–0 home victory against Cardiff City on 8 November 2008, coming on as a 67th-minute substitute in the match and scoring the winning goal with 10 minutes remaining. The goal was later featured in the BBC documentary The Four Year Plan, in which joint-owner Flavio Briatore was shown instructing sporting director Gianni Paladini to relay orders to caretaker manager Gareth Ainsworth to substitute Mahon onto the pitch. Mahon subsequently scored the late winner, prompting Briatore to celebrate in what was described as "a mixture of self-righteous anger and joy" in the directors' box. Mahon made 40 appearances during the season, playing under three different managers, as the club finished in mid-table.

Mahon played regularly in the opening months of the 2009–10 season, making nine appearances in all competitions and scoring once, with QPR winning seven of those matches. He sustained a knee injury in November 2009, which ruled him out for the remainder of the season. With his contract due to expire, manager Neil Warnock commented: "He'll probably come back and do a pre-season with us and try and show me what he can do. I've always liked Gavin, we've just got to wait and see who's available". Although Mahon was released at the end of the 2009–10 season, he returned to the club in October 2010 on a one-month contract, which he described as "like a trial". Whilst he did not make any further first-team appearances, the monthly deal was extended on four occasions.

He joined Championship club Crystal Palace on loan until the end of the 2010–11 season on 24 March 2011. Mahon did not make any appearances during the loan spell and returned to QPR in May 2011. The following month, he was one of eight players to be released by the club. During his time at QPR, he scored four goals in 66 appearances.

=== Notts County ===
Ahead of the 2011–12 season, Mahon returned to former club Watford for pre-season training in order to regain fitness. Although no contract was offered, he featured in a friendly against Brentford at the end of July 2011 and stated that he "really appreciated the opportunity" Watford had given him to train with the club.

Two weeks into the new season, on 25 August 2011, Mahon signed for League One club Notts County on an initial pay-as-you-play deal. He made his debut two days later as Notts County lost 2–0 away to Preston North End. Mahon impressed manager Martin Allen during his first month at the club, prompting Allen to seek a longer-term agreement. Mahon subsequently signed an 18-month contract on 13 October 2011, keeping him contracted at the club until the summer of 2013. He was described as a "pivotal" figure in Notts County's season, making 34 appearances as they missed out on a play-off place on goal difference. At the end of the season, the club expressed their desire to retain Mahon and offered him a new one-year contract, which he signed on 28 June 2012.

Mahon began his second season at Notts County playing predominantly as a substitute, making six starts and a further nine appearances as a substitute during the first half of the season. In November 2012, it was reported that Mahon was the subject of loan interest from two League Two clubs, Bristol Rovers and Port Vale. He declined the opportunity to go out on loan after manager Keith Curle informed him there was still a chance of him regaining his place in the first team. However, two weeks later, Mahon expressed a willingness to leave the club if he continued to be overlooked: "You do think like that sometimes, when you travel halfway across the country to get splinters in your backside, but that's football, you have to wait for your chance to come. I told him the last thing I want to do is leave a club like Notts, but when you get to my age you have got to play, especially if you want to go on and play next season".

In February 2013, Mahon joined fellow League One club Stevenage on a loan agreement for the remainder of the 2012–13 season. He made his debut for the club in a 2–1 away defeat to Shrewsbury Town on 23 February, playing the full 90 minutes. Mahon made nine appearances during the two-month loan spell. He was released by Notts County at the end of the 2012–13 season.

=== Portsmouth ===
Without a club for the first two months of the 2013–14 season, Mahon signed for League Two club Portsmouth on a one-month contract on 4 October 2013. He made his debut for the club four days later, playing the full match in a 2–1 Football League Trophy away victory against Oxford United. Mahon was sent off in a 2–1 FA Cup defeat to former club Stevenage on 9 November 2013, receiving a straight red card for an elbow on Filipe Morais. He made three appearances for Portsmouth, leaving upon the expiry of his contract on 28 November 2013.

=== Tamworth ===
In December 2013, Mahon signed for Conference Premier club Tamworth on a short-term deal until the end of the 2013–14 season. He made his debut for Tamworth in the club's 2–0 home victory over FC Halifax Town on 4 January 2014, playing the full match. Mahon played regularly for Tamworth during the second half of the season, starting all 23 of the games he played. He left the club upon the expiry of his contract in May 2014.

Ahead of the 2014–15 season, Mahon spent time on trial with Barnet, appearing in a pre-season friendly fixture against Peterborough United in July 2014. However, no transfer materialised. Mahon subsequently retired from professional football and began working for a sports consultancy company.

== Style of play ==
Mahon was predominantly deployed as a defensive midfielder throughout his career. He was described by former Notts County teammate Alan Judge as a "pivotal point" in central midfield, highlighting his composure in possession and preference for playing the ball on the ground.

== Personal life ==
Mahon has two children, Mia and Alfie. He is a supporter of Birmingham City.

Following his retirement from playing, Mahon joined sports consultancy company Stellar Group as a football intermediary, using his experience to mentor and support younger players.

== Career statistics ==
Appearances and goals by club, season and competition
Club	League				FA Cup		League Cup		Other		Total	
Club	Season	Division	Apps	Goals	Apps	Goals	Apps	Goals	Apps	Goals	Apps	Goals
Wolverhampton Wanderers	1995–96	First Division	0	0	0	0	0	0	0	0	0	0
Hereford United	1996–97	Third Division	6	1	0	0	1	0	0	0	7	1
Hereford United	1997–98	Conference National	42	2	6	0	—		3 (Note: Appearances in FA Trophy)	0	51	2
Hereford United	1998–99	Conference National	21	1	1	0	—		3	0	25	1
Hereford United	Total		69	4	7	0	1	0	6	0	83	4
Brentford	1998–99	Third Division	29	4	—		—		3 (Note: Appearance(s) in Football League Trophy)	0	32	4
Brentford	1999–2000	Second Division	37	3	2	0	2	0	3	0	44	3
Brentford	2000–01	Second Division	40	1	1	0	4	0	6	0	51	1
Brentford	2001–02	Second Division	35	0	2	0	2	0	0	0	39	0
Brentford	Total		141	8	5	0	8	0	12	0	166	8
Watford	2001–02	First Division	6	0	—		—		—		6	0
Watford	2002–03	First Division	17	0	5	0	0	0	0	0	22	0
Watford	2003–04	First Division	32	2	2	1	2	0	0	0	36	3
Watford	2004–05	Championship	43	0	2	0	6	0	0	0	51	0
Watford	2005–06	Championship	38	3	1	0	1	0	3 (Note: Appearances in 2006 Championship play-offs)	0	43	3
Watford	2006–07	Premier League	34	1	3	0	1	0	0	0	38	1
Watford	2007–08	Championship	19	0	—		0	0	0	0	19	0
Watford	Total		189	6	13	1	10	0	3	0	215	7
Queens Park Rangers	2007–08	Championship	16	1	1	0	—		—		17	1
Queens Park Rangers	2008–09	Championship	35	2	2	0	3	0	—		40	2
Queens Park Rangers	2009–10	Championship	7	1	0	0	2	0	—		9	1
Queens Park Rangers	2010–11	Championship	0	0	0	0	0	0	—		0	0
Queens Park Rangers	Total		58	4	3	0	5	0	0	0	66	4
Crystal Palace (loan)	2010–11	Championship	0	0	—		—		—		0	0
Notts County	2011–12	League One	31	0	3	0	0	0	0	0	34	0
Notts County	2012–13	League One	12	0	1	0	1	0	1	0	15	0
Notts County	Total		43	0	4	0	1	0	1	0	49	0
Stevenage (loan)	2012–13	League One	9	0	—		—		—		9	0
Portsmouth	2013–14	League Two	1	0	1	0	0	0	1	0	3	0
Tamworth	2013–14	Conference Premier	20	0	—		—		3	0	23	0
Career total			530	22	33	1	25	0	26	0	614	23

== Honours ==
Brentford

- Football League Third Division: 1998–99
- Football League Trophy runner-up: 2000–01

Watford

- Football League Championship play-offs: 2006

Individual

- Watford Player of the Year: 2003–04
