= 2012–13 Brighton & Hove Albion W.F.C. season =

Football season

Brighton & Hove Albion
2012–13 season
- Chairman: Tony Bloom
- Manager: Jay Lovett
- Stadium: Withdean Stadium
- Premier Southern Division: 4th
- FA Cup: Third round
- League Cup: Round of 16

The 2012–13 Brighton & Hove Albion W.F.C season was the club's 22nd season that saw them compete in the FA Women's Premier League Southern Division, the third tier of English women's football pyramid. The women's team finished fourth in the league, which saw a young Fran Kirby help Reading become champions.

Former professional defender Jay Lovett, who previously played professionally for Plymouth Argyle, Crawley Town and Brentford FC was manager of the women's team and later went on to manage Burgess Hill Town.

== Season overview ==
Brighton finished the campaign strong, finishing in fourth place out of ten teams in the Southern Division. Over 18 league fixtures, the club secured eight wins, four draws and six defeats, accumulating a total of 28 points.

=== WPL Southern Division ===
19 August 2012

Brighton & Hove Albion	4–0	Tottenham Hotspur

26 August 2012

West Ham United	2–0	Brighton & Hove Albion

9 September 2012

Brighton & Hove Albion	4–3	Colchester United

16 September 2012

Lewes	0–0	Brighton & Hove Albion

30 September 2012

Yeovil Town	1–2	Brighton & Hove Albion

7 October 2012

Brighton & Hove Albion	2–2	Gillingham

11 November 2012

Brighton & Hove Albion	4–3	Reading

9 December 2012

Gillingham	1–0	Brighton & Hove Albion

16 December 2012

Brighton & Hove Albion	1–0	Lewes

13 January 2013

Colchester United	1–1	Brighton & Hove Albion

24 February 2013

Queens Park Rangers	1–3	Brighton & Hove Albion

3 March 2013

Brighton & Hove Albion	2–2	Queens Park Rangers

17 March 2013

Brighton & Hove Albion	0–1	Millwall Lionesses

7 April 2013

Tottenham Hotspur	2–1	Brighton & Hove Albion

14 April 2013

Brighton & Hove Albion	3–2	West Ham United

21 April 2013

Reading	4–0	Brighton & Hove Albion

28 April 2013

Millwall Lionesses	1–5	Brighton & Hove Albion

5 May 2013

Brighton & Hove Albion	0–4	Yeovil Town

== Cup competitions ==
=== FA Women's Premier League Cup ===
==== Group stage ====
23 September 2012

Brighton & Hove Albion	5–2	Lewes
Rabson 16'; Stenning 19', 26'; Waine 75'; Found 79'		Bridges 40'; Cole 70'

14 October 2012

Charlton Athletic	5–2	Brighton & Hove Albion
Boyer 34'; Graham 42', 62'; Shepherd 45', 78'		Stenning 39'; Agg 52'

4 November 2012

Brighton & Hove Albion	3–2	Gillingham
O'Hagan 13'; Barton 52'; Rabson 72'		Cooper; Keogh

25 November 2012

Millwall Lionesses	0–4	Brighton & Hove Albion
		Barton 60'; Stenning 71', 90'; O'Hagan 81'

==== Knockout phase ====
Cardiff City	2–0	Brighton & Hove Albion
Lawrence 28'; Isaac 85'

=== Sussex Challenge Cup ===
The senior women's team won the Sussex Women's Challenge Cup. There was no Sussex Women's Challenge Trophy held this year, which is usually contested by the women's development squad.
