= Mark Williams (footballer, born 1981) =

English footballer

Personal information
- Full name: Mark Ross Williams
- Date of birth: 19 October 1981 (age 45)
- Place of birth: Chatham, England
- Height: 1.80 m (5 ft 11 in)
- Position: Right winger

Youth career
- Brentford
- Millwall
- –2000: Brentford

Senior career*
Years	Team	Apps	(Gls)
2000–2003	Brentford	72	(4)
2003–2004	Barnet	33	(0)
–2005	Woodlands Wellington		(1)
- * Club domestic league appearances and goals

Mark Ross Williams (born 19 October 1981) is an English retired professional footballer who played as a right winger in the Football League for Brentford. After his release in 2003, he played for Barnet and in Singapore for Woodlands Wellington, before retiring due to a back injury in 2005.

== Personal life ==
Williams is a Brentford supporter. After his retirement from football, Williams worked as a personal trainer and as of 2011, was running a kitchen design business. As of 2018, he was working in sales.

== Career statistics ==
Appearances and goals by club, season and competition
Club	Season	League			National Cup		League Cup		Other		Total	
Club	Season	Division	Apps	Goals	Apps	Goals	Apps	Goals	Apps	Goals	Apps	Goals
Brentford	2000–01	Second Division	30	2	1	0	1	0	2 (Note: Appearances in Football League Trophy)	0	34	2
Brentford	2001–02	Second Division	20	1	1	0	1	0	1	0	23	1
Brentford	2002–03	Second Division	22	1	1	0	1	0	1	0	25	1
Brentford	Total		72	4	3	0	3	0	4	0	82	4
Barnet	2003–04	Conference	33	0	4	0	—		1 (Note: Appearance in FA Trophy)	0	38	0
Career total			105	4	7	0	3	0	5	0	120	4
