= Ívar Ingimarsson =

Icelandic footballer (born 1977)

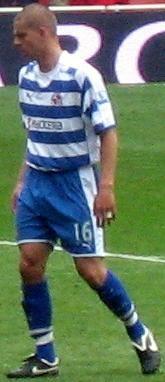
- Ívar playing for Reading in 2008

Personal information
- Full name: Ívar Ingimarsson
- Date of birth: 20 August 1977 (age 49)
- Place of birth: Reykjavík, Iceland
- Height: 1.85 m (6 ft 1 in)
- Position: Centre back

Senior career*
Years	Team	Apps	(Gls)
1995–1997	Valur	44	(5)
1998–1999	ÍBV	36	(5)
1999	→ Torquay United (loan)	4	(1)
1999–2002	Brentford	113	(10)
2002–2003	Wolverhampton Wanderers	13	(2)
2003	→ Brighton & Hove Albion (loan)	15	(0)
2003–2011	Reading	251	(11)
2011–2012	Ipswich Town	8	(0)
Total		484	(34)

International career
1993–1994	Iceland U17	16	(2)
1995–1996	Iceland U19	11	(2)
1996–1999	Iceland U21	14	(0)
1998–2007	Iceland	30	(0)
- * Club domestic league appearances and goals

Ívar Ingimarsson (born 20 August 1977) is an Icelandic former professional footballer who played as a centre back.

He began his career in Iceland with Valur and ÍBV before moving to England where, after an initial loan spell with Torquay United, he joined Brentford, making over 100 appearances. He moved to Reading in 2003, spending the next eight years with club and amassing 281 appearances before ending his career with a short spell at Ipswich Town.

At international level Ívar represented Iceland at under-17, under-19 and under-21 level before making his senior debut in 1998. After thirty appearances he retired from international football in 2007.

== Club career ==
=== Early years ===
Ívar was born in Reykjavík and raised in Stöðvarfjörður. He began his career with his local side Súlan. From the age of 13 he played for a merged side Súlan participated in, playing three seasons of senior football in total before joining Valur in Reykjavík, making 44 league appearances and scoring five goals after spending his first year there playing youth football again. In March 1998, he signed for fellow Icelandic side ÍBV, making a further 36 appearances in the Úrvalsdeild, and scoring five goals, winning the double (Icelandic Premier Division and the Icelandic Cup) in 1998.

Ívar joined Torquay United on loan from ÍBV in October 1999, scoring on his debut in a 2–1 victory at league leaders Barnet on 23 October 1999. Rumours were rife that a deal had already been done to take Ívar elsewhere at the end of his loan spell, and, after four league games for the Gulls, he duly signed for Brentford in November 1999 for £150,000, confirming the fears of Torquay fans that he would never be a permanent fixture at Plainmoor.

While at Brentford, the band The Bluetones named one of their instrumental B-sides Ingimarsson in his honour; Adam Devlin, the guitarist, being a Bees fan. He was released by Brentford in June 2002, the Bees unable to pay his wages. He signed for Wolverhampton Wanderers the following month, but was unable to establish himself at Molineux, resulting in a loan spell with Brighton & Hove Albion in February 2003.

=== Reading ===
In October 2003, Ívar was linked with a move to Crystal Palace, but snubbed them in favour of a move to Reading, whom he joined in a £175,000 deal on 23 October 2003 as Steve Coppell's first signing as Reading manager.

At Reading, he held a key place in the first team playing alongside Ibrahima Sonko. Together they formed one of the best defences in the English Football League. On occasions he came up with the odd goal and proved vital in some games. He helped Reading to promotion to the Premier League in 2006 and played in Reading's first ever game in the top flight of English League football, a 3–2 win at home against Middlesbrough on 19 August 2006. On 13 November 2006, Ívar signed a contract extension to keep him at Reading until June 2009, and on 5 May 2007 it was announced that he had been voted the 2006–07 Player of the Season by Reading fans.

On 4 July 2007, Ívar signed an improved three-year contract to keep him at Reading until the end of the 2009–10 season.

Following the release of Graeme Murty from Reading, and the arrival of new manager Brendan Rodgers, Ívar was announced as Reading's new club captain on 7 August 2009.

Ívar played in all of Reading's FA Cup matches in the 2009/10 campaign including their famous 2–1 win over Liverpool at Anfield. He asked the new manager, Brian McDermott, to be rested for one game because he had played continuously since returning from injury in September. However, he was rested for two matches which were against Blackpool (which Reading lost 2–0) and for the match against Crystal Palace (which Reading won 3–1). Whilst playing in the 1–1 draw against Middlesbrough in March, Ívar had to come off in injury time at the end of the match due to a hamstring injury. As a result, this injury would keep Ívar out of action for the rest of the season.

Ívar was then offered a new one-year contract at the end of the 2009–10 season which he signed on 14 May 2010. It was announced that, after eight years and 282 appearances for the Royals, Ívar had been released from Reading. Former Reading captain Ady Williams stated that "Ivar will go down as a Reading legend".

=== Ipswich Town ===
On 13 June 2011, it was announced that Ívar had joined Ipswich Town on a free transfer, following his release from Reading. Manager Paul Jewell announced the deal, with Ívar handed a one-year contract. Following a disappointing first half to the 2011–12 season, after six starts and two substitute appearances, on 7 January 2012 it was announced that Ívar's contract had been terminated by mutual consent.

== International career ==
Ívar represented Iceland at under-17, under-19 and under-21 level, making 16, 11 and 14 appearances respectively. He made his senior debut for Iceland in a June 1998 friendly match against South Africa. He opted to retire from international football for a period of just under two years because of arguments with the former joint-managers Ásgeir Sigurvinsson and Logi Ólafsson. He became available again once the pair were replaced by Eyjólfur Sverrisson, and made several further appearances before retiring again in 2007.

== Personal life ==
After retiring from football Ívar returned to Iceland and moved into the tourist industry. His cousin, Gunnar Thorvaldsson was also a professional footballer and spent the second half of the 2009–10 season on loan at Reading.

== Career statistics ==
As of match played 2 January 2012.

Club	Season	League			Cup		League Cup		Other		Total	
Club	Season	Division	Apps	Goals	Apps	Goals	Apps	Goals	Apps	Goals	Apps	Goals
Valur	1995	Úrvalsdeild	11	0	5	0	—		—		16	0
Valur	1996	Úrvalsdeild	17	2	3	0	?	?	—		20	2
Valur	1997	Úrvalsdeild	16	3	3	0	?	?	—		19	3
Valur	Total		44	5	11	0	?	?	—		55	5
ÍBV	1998	Úrvalsdeild	18	1	5	0	?	?	3 (Note: One appearance in Icelandic Super Cup, two appearances in Champions League)	0	24	1
ÍBV	1999	Úrvalsdeild	18	4	4	0	?	?	4 (Note: Appearances in Champions League)	0	26	4
ÍBV	Total		36	5	9	0	?	?	7	0	52	5
Torquay United (loan)	1999–2000	Third Division	4	1	0	0	0	0	0	0	4	1
Brentford	1999–2000	Second Division	25	1	0	0	0	0	3 (Note: Appearances in Football League Trophy)	0	28	1
Brentford	2000–01	Second Division	42	3	1	0	4	0	6	1	53	4
Brentford	2001–02	Second Division	46	6	2	0	2	0	4 (Note: One appearance in Football League Trophy, three appearances in Second Division play-offs)	0	54	6
Brentford	Total		113	10	3	0	6	0	13	1	135	11
Wolverhampton Wanderers	2002–03	First Division	13	2	0	0	2	0	0	0	15	2
Brighton & Hove Albion (loan)	2002–03	First Division	15	0	0	0	0	0	—		15	0
Reading	2003–04	First Division	25	1	1	0	2	0	—		28	1
Reading	2004–05	Championship	44	3	3	1	2	0	—		49	4
Reading	2005–06	Championship	46	2	3	0	4	0	—		53	2
Reading	2006–07	Premier League	38	2	3	0	1	0	—		42	2
Reading	2007–08	Premier League	34	2	1	0	0	0	—		35	2
Reading	2008–09	Championship	26	1	0	0	3	0	0	0	29	1
Reading	2009–10	Championship	25	0	6	0	0	0	—		31	0
Reading	2010–11	Championship	13	0	1	0	0	0	0	0	14	0
Reading	Total		251	11	18	1	12	0	0	0	281	12
Ipswich Town	2011–12	Championship	8	0	0	0	0	0	—		8	0
Career total			484	34	41	1	20	0	20	1	565	36

=== International ===
Appearances and goals by national team and year
National team	Year	Apps	Goals
Iceland
Iceland	1998	1	0
Iceland	2000	1	0
Iceland	2002	7	0
Iceland	2003	3	0
Iceland	2004	4	0
Iceland	2006	6	0
Iceland	2007	8	0
Total		30	0

== Honours ==
ÍBV

- Icelandic Premier Division: 1998
- Icelandic Cup: 1998

Brentford

- Football League Trophy runner-up: 2000–01

Reading

- Football League Championship: 2005–06

Individual

- Brentford Player of the Year: 2001–02
- Reading Player of the Season: 2006–07
