= Darren Powell =

English footballer (born 1976)

Personal information
- Full name: Darren David Powell
- Date of birth: 10 March 1976 (age 50)
- Place of birth: Hammersmith, England
- Height: 6 ft 3 in (1.91 m)
- Position: Centre-back

Team information
- Current team: Crystal Palace (under-21s manager)

Senior career*
Years	Team	Apps	(Gls)
1997–1998	Hampton		
1998–2002	Brentford	128	(6)
2002–2005	Crystal Palace	55	(2)
2004	→ West Ham United (loan)	5	(1)
2005–2008	Southampton	43	(2)
2008–2009	Derby County	6	(0)
2009	Brentford	4	(1)
2009–2010	Milton Keynes Dons	24	(0)
2012–2014	Hampton & Richmond Borough	15	(0)
Total		280	(12)

Managerial career
- 2013–2014: Hampton & Richmond Borough
- * Club domestic league appearances and goals

Darren David Powell (born 10 March 1976) is an English football manager and former professional footballer who played as a centre-back. He is the Under-21s head coach at Crystal Palace. During his playing career, he appeared over 250 times in the Football League and Premier League. Powell was known as "a tough-tackling centre-back".

Following his retirement, Powell moved to coaching and managing Hampton & Richmond Borough before taking over as an academy coach for Crystal Palace.

== Playing career ==
=== Brentford ===
Powell began his career with Hampton, where he quickly established himself in the starting eleven for the side. His performance attracted interests from Stevenage and Hayes before he joined Brentford for £15,000.

Powell made his debut for Brentford, where he played the whole game, in a 3–0 win over Mansfield Town. He started well for the side at the beginning of the season, winning five out of the six matches by the end of August, including scoring his first goal for the side, in a 2–1 win over Rochdale. He was later in the squad for Brentford when he helped the club win the Division Two by four points. At the end of the 1998–99 season, Powell had made 37 appearances, scoring twice in all competitions. For his performances, he was named the club's Player of the Year.

In the 1999–2000 season, Powell continued to be a first team regular. He then scored his first goal for the club, in a 2–0 win over Luton Town on 16 September 1999. A month later, on 16 October 1999, Powell scored again, in a 2–0 win over Oxford United. He spent the rest of the 1999–00 season, as a first team regular and went on to make 43 appearances, scoring three times in all competitions.

However, in the 2000–01 season, Powell suffered a hamstring injury that saw him sidelined until January. On his return from injury, he was sent–off on his first appearance on 13 January 2001, in a 0–0 draw against Bristol Rovers. After returning, he regained his first team place for the side. On 21 March 2001, Powell was sent–off for the second time that season, in a 2–1 win over Southend United, which saw Brentford go through to the LDV Final following a 4–2 on aggregate. This was followed up by scoring his first goal of the season, in a 1–0 win over Wrexham on 31 March 2001. However, in the Football League Trophy Final against Port Vale, Powell played the whole game, in a 2–1 loss. At the end of the 2000–01 season, he had made 22 appearances, scoring once in all competitions.

In the 2001–02 season, Powell retained his first team place for the side despite being linked with a move away from the club. On 18 September 2001, he scored his first goal of the season, in a 2–2 draw against Bristol Rovers. Powell then captained Brentford for the first time in his career following the absence of Paul Evans, as the club lost 1–0 against Northampton Town. During a 0–0 draw against Chesterfield on 12 March 2002, he tore his hamstring early in the first half and was substituted as a result. Powell returned to the first team on 6 April 2002, in a 3–0 win over Huddersfield Town. On 1 May 2002, he scored his second goal of the season, in a 2–1 win over Huddersfield Town to help Brentford reach the Second Division play-off final at the Millennium Stadium, where they lost 2–0 to Stoke City. At the end of the 2001–02 season, Powell had made 48 appearances, scoring twice in all competitions.

During his time at Brentford, Powell made 150 appearances and scored eight times in all competitions.

=== Crystal Palace ===
In the summer transfer window of 2002, it was expected that Powell would stay at Brentford for the 2002–03 season. However, in August, he signed for Crystal Palace for £400,000, having previously been targeted by the Eagles manager Trevor Francis.

Powell made his Crystal Palace debut in the opening game of the season against Preston North End, starting and scoring the first goal, in a 2–1 win. From the start of the season, he established himself in the starting eleven. On 10 September 2002, Powell scored again in the first round of the League Cup, in a 2–1 win over Plymouth Argyle. Despite being sidelined on numerous occasions during the 2002–03 season, Powell went on to make 46 appearances, scoring twice in all competitions.

In the 2003–04 season, Powell was initially an integral part of the team, but was subsequently plagued with injuries. Powell was also suspended when he received a second bookable offence, in a 1–1 draw against Derby County on 14 October 2003. While on the sidelines, Powell was close to joining Palace's Division One rivals, Reading, but the transfer move broke down, citing a failed medical, as well as, manager Iain Dowie's desire to keep him. After seven months away from the first team, he returned to training. Powell made his first appearance from injury on 14 May 2004, where he came on as a late substitute in a 3–2 first-leg Play-off semi-final win over Sunderland. Powell then scored in the dying seconds of the away second-leg game at the Stadium of Light taking the score on the night to a 2–1 defeat, but the aggregate score was level at 4–4. Palace won on penalties and were promoted to the Premiership, following a play-off final win over West Ham. At the end of the 2003–04 season, Powell had made 15 appearances, scoring once in all competitions.

In the 2004–05 season, however, Powell found himself dropping down the pecking order in the club's first team and having limited game time, only appearing three times in the League Cup. On 20 November 2004, he spent a month on loan to West Ham. His debut came on 24 November 2004 against rivals' Millwall, where he played the whole game, in a 1–0 loss. In a follow-up match against Watford, Powell scored his only goal for the club, in a 3–2 win. After his spell at West Ham United, Powell returned to his parent club, Crystal Palace.

Upon returning to Palace, Powell made his first Premier League appearance, where he played the whole game, in a 2–0 win over Aston Villa on 3 January 2005. In a follow-up match against Manchester City on 15 January 2005, he scored his first Premier League goal, in a 3–1 loss. However, injuries plagued him once again, as the club were relegated to the Championship at the end of the season. At the end of the 2004–05 season, Powell had made 10 appearances, scoring once in all competitions, but was subsequently released by the club.

=== Southampton ===
In July 2005, he was out of contract and signed for Harry Redknapp at Southampton on a Bosman free transfer.

Powell made his Southampton debut, where he played the whole game in a centre–back partnership with Tomasz Hajto, in a 0–0 draw against Wolverhampton Wanderers. He then helped the Saints keep three clean sheets during August against Sheffield Wednesday, Norwich City and Crewe Alexandra. On joining the club, he quickly became a first team regular. Powell's first goal for Southampton was against Ipswich Town on 13 September 2005. He started in every match until he was hit with a three match suspension following his foul on Reading's Kevin Doyle. On 22 November 2005, he returned to the starting line-up after a month away, in a 1–1 draw against Hull City. However, Powell soon lost his first team place following the appointment of George Burley, as well as, his own injury concerns. At the end of the 2005–06 season, Powell had made 26 appearances, scoring once in all competitions.

In the 2006–07 season, Powell, was sidelined until the end of the year. While on the sidelines, Powell was the subject of a transfer bid from Leeds United, which was rejected by the club. He did not make his return to the first team until 6 January 2007, where he played the whole game, in a 2–0 win over Torquay United in the first round of the FA Cup. This was followed by keeping another two clean sheets against Burnley and Queens Park Rangers. However, Powell was once again sidelined with another injury that kept him out throughout February. Once again, Powell helped the side keep two clean sheets in a row against Wolverhampton Wanderers and Luton Town between 31 March 2007 and 7 April 2007. Following this, Powell was incurred an injury that ultimately ruled him out for the rest of the season. At the end of the 2006–07 season, Powell had made ten appearances.

In the 2007–08 season, Powell missed the first three matches, due to suspension. His suspension came after he was sent–off for violent conduct after reacting angrily to a heavy challenge from Phil Mulryne, in the club's win at AFC Bournemouth the previous month. After serving a three-match suspension, he made his return to the first team against Stoke City on 25 August 2007, in a 3–2 win. His return, was short–lived though, as he suffered an ankle injury during the match. After returning to training from injury in early–December, Powell did not make his return to the first team until 29 December 2007, where he came on as a second–half substitute, in a 2–2 draw against Barnsley. After being sidelined on three separate occasions throughout January, Powell scored his second goal for the club with a first minute tap in from Adam Hammill's cross in a 3–2 home defeat to Queens Park Rangers. However, Powell continued to be plagued with injuries towards the end of the season. At the end of the 2007–08 season, Powell had made thirteen appearances, scoring once in all competitions.

After three years of failing to establish himself in the first team due to a run of minor injuries, returning chairman Rupert Lowe decided not to renew Powell's contract.

=== Derby County ===
He trained with Charlton Athletic whilst searching for a club and was handed a trial at Derby County in November 2008. On 21 November 2008, Powell signed an initial two-month contract for Derby, and made his debut in the 2–0 defeat to Ipswich Town a day later.

However, Powell was released by Derby on 21 January 2009, after new manager Nigel Clough decided against extending his contract, Powell played eight times for the club.

=== Brentford (second spell) ===
On 11 March 2009, Powell joined Leeds United on a trial basis. However, after making two reserve appearances, the club decided against offering him a contract. He re-signed for his first professional club, Brentford, on 21 March 2009 on a contract until the end of the season.

Powell made his second Brentford debut on 28 March 2009, where he came on as a late substitute and received a positive reception from Brentford supporters, in a 1–1 draw against Gillingham. He managed only a handful of appearances before being sent–off on 14 April 2009, in a 1–0 win over Bournemouth following an altercation with teammate Karleigh Osborne. Powell never played for the side again; he had made four appearances and was released at the end of the season.

=== Milton Keynes Dons ===
On 7 August 2009, Powell agreed a one-year contract with League One team Milton Keynes Dons.

He played his first game for the club in a 0–0 draw against Hartlepool United on 8 August 2009. Powell was involved in the next two matches against Swindon Town and Tranmere Rovers, where the team kept two clean sheets. He became a first team regular at the club, under the management of Paul Ince. Then, on 3 October 2009, Powell played a vital role when he set up the only goal of the game, in a 1–0 win over Brighton & Hove Albion. However, he was plagued by injuries during the season. At the end of the 2009–10 season, Powell had made twenty–seven appearances, scoring once in all competitions.

Along with three other players, he was released by MK Dons at the end of his contract on 30 June 2010.

=== Hampton & Richmond Borough ===
In January 2012, Hampton & Richmond Borough Chairman Steve McPherson claimed that Powell was close to making a comeback with the club. a move which was confirmed on 27 January.

He made his second debut for the club the next day coming off the bench at half time in a 2–2 draw away to Havant & Waterlooville. However, he was plagued by injuries during his time at the club. He made 15 appearances for the side and subsequently announced his retirement from playing.

== Coaching career ==
=== Hampton & Richmond Borough ===
In April 2013, Powell and first-team coach Paul Barry took charge of Hampton & Richmond Borough, now in the National League South, on a caretaker basis until the end of the season after manager Mark Harper resigned his position. The pair were installed as the permanent management team in May 2013.

The pair helped the side go nine matches unbeaten between 3 December 2013 and 21 January 2014. At the end of the 2013–14 season, the side finished in twelfth place in the league. The club went on to win the Middlesex Senior Cup after beating Wealdstone 3–2.

However, a poor start to the 2014–15 season saw Powell sacked along with Barry after Hampton & Richmond lost 3–2 to VCD Athletic in the FA Cup qualifying round on 13 September 2014. After leaving the club, Powell enrolled on the Elite Coaches Apprenticeship Scheme and acquired his A Licence.

=== Crystal Palace ===
On 24 February 2015, Powell joined the academy coaching team at Crystal Palace. In March 2023, after Roy Hodgson returned as manager with Paddy McCarthy as his assistant, Powell was appointed as head-coach of the under-21 team.

== Career statistics ==
Appearances and goals by club, season and competition
Club	Season	League			FA Cup		League Cup		Other		Total	
Club	Season	Division	Apps	Goals	Apps	Goals	Apps	Goals	Apps	Goals	Apps	Goals
Brentford	1998–99	Third Division	33	2	0	0	3	0	1 (Note: Appearances in Football League Trophy)	0	37	2
Brentford	1999–2000	Second Division	36	2	2	0	2	0	3	1	43	3
Brentford	2000–01	Second Division	18	1	0	0	0	0	4	0	22	1
Brentford	2001–02	Second Division	41	1	2	0	2	0	3 (Note: Appearances in Second Division play-offs)	1	48	2
Brentford	Total		128	6	4	0	7	0	11	2	150	8
Crystal Palace	2002–03	First Division	39	1	2	0	5	1	―		46	2
Crystal Palace	2003–04	First Division	10	0	0	0	2	0	3 (Note: Appearances in First Division play-offs)	1	15	1
Crystal Palace	2004–05	Premier League	6	1	1	0	3	0	―		10	1
Crystal Palace	Total		55	2	3	0	10	1	3	1	71	4
West Ham United (loan)	2004–05	Championship	5	1	―		―		―		5	1
Southampton	2005–06	Championship	25	1	1	0	0	0	―		26	1
Southampton	2006–07	Championship	8	0	2	0	0	0	0	0	10	0
Southampton	2007–08	Championship	10	1	3	0	0	0	―		13	1
Southampton	Total		43	2	6	0	0	0	0	0	49	2
Derby County	2008–09	Championship	6	0	1	0	1	0	―		8	0
Brentford	2008–09	League Two	4	1	―		―		―		4	1
Brentford	Total		128	6	4	0	7	0	11	2	150	8
Milton Keynes Dons	2009–10	League One	23	0	2	0	1	0	1	0	27	0
Hampton & Richmond Borough	2011–12	Conference South	15	0	―		―		1 (Note: Appearance in FA Trophy)	0	16	0
Career total			279	13	16	0	19	1	16	2	330	16

== Honours ==
Brentford

- Football League Third Division: 1998–99
- Football League Trophy runner-up: 2000–01

Crystal Palace

- Football League First Division play-offs: 2004

Individual

- Brentford Supporters' Player of the Year: 1998–99
