= Michael Dobson (footballer) =

English footballer

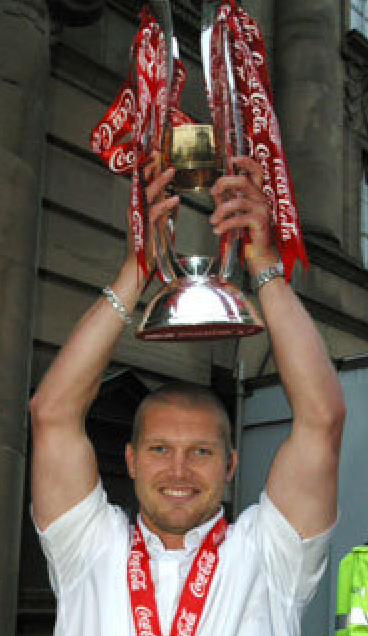
- Dobson while with Walsall in 2007.

Personal information
- Full name: Michael William Dobson
- Date of birth: 9 April 1981 (age 45)
- Place of birth: Isleworth, England
- Height: 6 ft 0 in (1.83 m)
- Positions: Full back; midfielder

Youth career
- 1990–1999: Brentford

Senior career*
Years	Team	Apps	(Gls)
1999–2006	Brentford	177	(3)
2006	→ Reading (loan)	1	(0)
2006–2008	Walsall	63	(4)
Total		241	(7)
- * Club domestic league appearances and goals

Michael William Dobson (born 9 April 1981) is an English former professional footballer, who made over 170 appearances in the Football League for Brentford as a full back. He also played League football for Walsall and Reading and was nicknamed "Dobbo".

== Career ==
=== Brentford ===
==== Youth years (1990–2000) ====
Born in Isleworth, London, Dobson began his career as a forward in the youth system at Brentford at the age of 9 and also played for Sunday club West Middlesex Colts. He signed a scholarship deal with Brentford at the end of the 1996–97 season and was named as an unused substitute on one occasion during 1998–99. Dobson signed his first professional contract at the end of the 1998–99 season, but was called onto the substitutes' bench just once during 1999–00.

==== Breakthrough (2000–2002) ====
Dobson finally made his senior debut as a 71st-minute substitute for Andy Scott during a 0–0 Second Division draw with Swansea City on 19 August 2000. Due to the continued absence of injured right back Danny Boxall, Dobson made his first start for the Bees in a 4–1 Football League Trophy first round victory over Oxford United on 5 December and thereafter became a regular starter in the team at full back on either flank. He starred in Brentford's run to the 2001 Football League Trophy Final and scored Brentford's goals in the 2–1 Southern Area Final first leg win over Southend United and opened the scoring versus Port Vale in the final at the Millennium Stadium, but the match ended in a 2–1 defeat for the Bees. As a reward for his progress, Dobson signed a new three-and-a-half-year contract on 23 March 2001 and he finished the 2000–01 season with 34 appearances and three goals.

Under new manager Steve Coppell, Dobson was Brentford's regular right back during the 2001–02 season, in which the club narrowly missed out on automatic promotion, before advancing to the 2002 Second Division play-off final, which ended in a 2–0 defeat to Stoke City. Despite being plagued by pelvic bruising during the season, which required painkillers, Dobson made 46 appearances and scored one goal, which came in a 3–2 FA Cup second round defeat to Scunthorpe United on 8 December 2001.

==== Captain (2002–2004) ====
After the play-off final defeat at the end of the 2001–02 season, financial concerns led new manager Wally Downes to reduce the size of the Brentford squad and at the age of 21, Dobson was named as the new team captain. During the 2002–03 season, Dobson was an ever-present in league matches and made 54 appearances and scored one goal. He made more assists than any other Brentford player, with seven. Dobson signed a new three-year contract in July 2003. The Bees' slump continued into the 2003–04 season and Dobson's form suffered due to a niggling back injury, but the appointment of Martin Allen as manager in March 2004 reinvigorated the team and the club narrowly pulled off "The Great Escape" from relegation to the Third Division. He made 46 appearances and scored one goal during the 2003–04 season.

==== Injury-affected final seasons (2004–2006) ====
Dobson began the 2004–05 season as the Bees' regular starting right back, but a torn cartilage suffered in September 2004 saw him lose his place to stand-in right back Kevin O'Connor and the captaincy to midfielder Stewart Talbot. He won back his place upon his return in January 2005, but began to drift out of the starting lineup in February and a broken arm suffered in a match versus Stockport County on 2 April ended his season. He made 23 appearances and scored one goal during 2004–05. Dobson appeared sparingly as a midfielder during the early months of the 2005–06 season and later admitted in 2019 that he and manager Martin Allen "didn't see eye-to-eye". On 24 November 2005, he departed to join high-flying Championship club Reading on loan for the remainder of the campaign. The move which generated funds to extend the loan of Darren Pratley, who had usurped Dobson in the midfield pecking order.

Dobson reunited with his former Brentford management team of Steve Coppell and Wally Downes at Reading, but his only appearance for the Royals came as a 53rd-minute substitute for Steve Sidwell in a 3–1 victory over Stoke City on 17 April 2006. Reading celebrated promotion to the Premier League at the end of the season, though Dobson did not receive a Championship-winners' medal.

Dobson was released by Brentford at the end of the 2005–06 season and ended his career with the club on 211 appearances and seven goals.

=== Walsall ===
On 7 June 2006, Dobson signed a two-year contract with newly relegated League Two club Walsall on a free transfer. He was immediately named captain by manager Richard Money. Despite being "frequently the target of criticism", Dobson had a memorable 2006–07 season, making 42 appearances, scoring three goals and winning the first silverware of his career when the Saddlers clinched the League Two title, which secured an immediate return to League One. A less successful 2007–08 season followed, with Dobson losing his midfield place and suffering from persistent knee issues. He was released in May 2008 and finished his two-season spell with at Bescot Stadium with 68 appearances and four goals. Dobson parted the club with the words "there were a lot of things going on behind closed doors that players weren't happy about and I wasn't really enjoying my football".

=== Retirement ===
After receiving advice from two specialists, recurring knee problems forced Dobson into retirement during the 2008 off-season.

== Personal life ==
Dobson is the son of former footballer George Dobson and is the younger brother of football coach Richard Dobson. He attended The Heathland School and as of 2019 was living in Banbury. Dobson currently runs his own business called Flexercise, which specialises in personal training and sports massaging therapy.

== Career statistics ==
Appearances and goals by club, season and competition
Club	Season	League			FA Cup		League Cup		Other		Total	
Club	Season	Division	Apps	Goals	Apps	Goals	Apps	Goals	Apps	Goals	Apps	Goals
Brentford	1998–99	Third Division	0	0	0	0	0	0	0	0	0	0
Brentford	1999–2000	Second Division	0	0	0	0	0	0	0	0	0	0
Brentford	2000–01	Second Division	26	0	0	0	1	0	7 (Note: Appearances in Football League Trophy)	3	34	3
Brentford	2001–02	Second Division	39	0	2	1	2	0	3 (Note: Appearances in Second Division play-offs)	0	46	1
Brentford	2002–03	Second Division	46	1	4	0	2	0	2	0	54	1
Brentford	2003–04	Second Division	42	1	1	0	1	0	2	0	46	1
Brentford	2004–05	League One	18	1	4	0	1	0	0	0	23	1
Brentford	2005–06	League One	6	0	1	0	0	0	1	0	8	0
Brentford	Total		177	3	12	1	7	0	15	3	211	7
Reading (loan)	2005–06	Championship	1	0	—		—		—		1	0
Walsall	2006–07	League Two	39	3	2	0	1	0	0	0	42	3
Walsall	2007–08	League One	24	1	1	0	1	0	0	0	26	1
Walsall	Total		63	4	3	0	2	0	0	0	68	4
Career total			241	7	15	1	9	0	15	3	280	11

== Honours ==
Brentford

- Football League Trophy runner-up: 2000–01

Walsall

- Football League Two: 2006–07
