= Julian Charles =

Former footballer

Personal information
- Full name: Julian Ian Charles
- Date of birth: 5 February 1977 (age 49)
- Place of birth: Plaistow, England
- Position: Forward

Senior career*
Years	Team	Apps	(Gls)
1994–1996	Cheshunt		
1996–1998	Grays Athletic		
1998	Billericay Town	8	(1)
1998–1999	Witham Town		
1999	Barking	4	(0)
1999	Hampton & Richmond Borough		
1999–2002	Brentford	12	(0)
2000	→ Woking (loan)	11	(0)
2001	→ Farnborough Town (loan)	4	(0)
2002	Billericay Town	3	(0)
2002–2003	Weymouth	6	(3)
2003	→ Aylesbury United (loan)	2	(1)
2003	→ Leatherhead (loan)		
2003	Aylesbury United	4	(0)
2003	→ Wingate & Finchley (loan)		
2003–2004	Clacton Town	15	(1)
2004–2006	Weymouth		
2006	Ilford		
2006–2007	Hounslow Borough		
2007	Redbridge	8	(2)
2010–	Ilford		

International career
2000	Saint Vincent and the Grenadines	2	(0)
- * Club domestic league appearances and goals

Julian Ian Charles (born 5 February 1977) is a former footballer from Saint Vincent and the Grenadines who played as a striker.

== Career ==
=== Club career ===
Charles moved from Hampton & Richmond Borough to Brentford in December 1999, for a fee of £25,000. While at Brentford, Charles made 12 appearances in the Football League, before later moving to Billericay Town in October 2001. Charles rejoined Ilford in April 2010.

=== International career ===
Charles played international football for Saint Vincent and the Grenadines, earning two caps in 2000.

== Personal life ==
Charles has three brothers, Ian, Darren and Jason, and as of 2002 had a son. Prior to taking up football, Charles was a ski instructor in Switzerland, Italy and Austria. He also holds an HND in Graphic Design, a degree in Design and later worked as a graphic designer. At the time he was playing for Brentford, Charles lived in Newbury Park. He is a Liverpool supporter.
