= Lorenzo Pinamonte =

Italian footballer

Personal information
- Full name: Lorenzo Pinamonte
- Date of birth: 9 May 1978 (age 48)
- Place of birth: Caprino Veronese, Italy
- Height: 1.92 m (6 ft 3 1/2 in)
- Positions: Midfielder; forward

Senior career*
Years	Team	Apps	(Gls)
1998–2000	Bristol City	7	(1)
1999	→ Carlisle United (loan)	0	(0)
1999–2000	→ Brighton & Hove Albion (loan)	9	(2)
2000–2001	Brentford	23	(2)
2001	→ Leyton Orient (loan)	11	(2)
2001–2002	Castel di Sangro	19	(5)
2002–2003	Arezzo	20	(4)
2003–2005	Novara	58	(14)
2005–2006	Benevento	32	(12)
2006–2008	Lumezzane	61	(19)
2008	Brindisi	?	(?)
- * Club domestic league appearances and goals as of 10:59, 24 April 2009 (UTC)

Lorenzo Pinamonte (born 9 May 1978) is a retired Italian footballer who last played as a midfielder and forward for Brindisi.

He also spent a number of seasons in England playing for Bristol City, Carlisle United, Brighton & Hove Albion, Brentford and Leyton Orient.

== Career in England ==
Pinamonte made his debut for Bristol City in a First Division match; a 1–0 home win against Norwich City at Ashton Gate on 9 May 1999, in which he scored the only goal of the game. He had two loan spells whilst at Bristol City; the first to Carlisle United in March 1999, but he didn't make any appearances. The second to Brighton & Hove Albion in late 1999. At Brighton, he made 9 league appearances and scored 2 goals; both coming in a 4–2 win over Exeter City in January 2000. Shortly afterwards, he signed for Brentford, where he remained until July 2001. Whilst at Brentford, he had a loan spell at Leyton Orient, where he scored on his debut against Halifax Town.

== Later career ==
He returned to Italy in 2001 joining Castel di Sangro in the Serie C1, then playing at Serie C1 and Serie C2 with Arezzo, Novara, Benevento and Lumezzane. In November 2008 he left Lumezzane to join Serie D team Brindisi.
