= Ólafur Gottskálksson =

Icelandic footballer

Personal information
- Full name: Ólafur Gottskálksson
- Date of birth: 12 March 1968 (age 58)
- Place of birth: Keflavík, Iceland
- Height: 6 ft 3 in (1.91 m)
- Position: Goalkeeper

Youth career
- Keflavik

Senior career*
Years	Team	Apps	(Gls)
1988–1990	IA Akranes	33	(0)
1990–1994	KR Reykjavík	71	(0)
1994–1997	Keflavik	63	(0)
1997–2000	Hibernian	64	(0)
2000–2002	Brentford	73	(0)
2003–2004	Grindavik	10	(0)
2004	Keflavik	11	(0)
2004	Margate		
2004–2005	Torquay United	15	(0)
Total		340	(0)

International career
1988–1989	Iceland U21	6	(0)
1991–1998	Iceland	10	(0)
Basketball career
Career information
Playing career	1983–1994
Career history
1983–1988	Keflavík
1989–1990	Keflavík
1990–1991	Víkverji
1991–1992	KR
1993–1994	Keflavík
Career highlights
Icelandic Basketball Cup (1994); 1. deild karla winner (1985)
- * Club domestic league appearances and goals

Ólafur Gottskálksson (born 12 March 1968 in Keflavík) is a retired Icelandic professional football goalkeeper. He played ten games for Icelandic national football team.

== Football ==
=== Club career ===
Ólafur played for IA Akranes and KR Reykjavík before joining Scottish side Hibernian from Keflavik in July 1997 for a fee of £200,000. He played 70 times for Hibs before joining Brentford on a free transfer in May 2000. He went on to play 73 league games for Brentford, at one point having to pay for his own goalkeeping coach. He had a trial with Stockport County in July 2002 and was offered a two-year contract, but chose to remain with Brentford. He was also linked with a move to Ipswich Town, but in November 2002 was forced to retire due to a shoulder injury.

He returned to Iceland and resumed his playing career with Grindavik.

On his return to the United Kingdom in August 2004, he had a trial with Grimsby Town, before joining Conference South side Margate, moving to Torquay United the following month, as a replacement for the departing Arjan van Heusden. He was one of seven goalkeepers used that season (the others being Phil Barnes, Bertrand Bossu, Kevin Dearden, Paul Jarvie, Andy Marriott and Arjan van Heusden) and played 15 league games for Torquay before disappearing in January 2005 when, according to then Torquay chairman Mike Bateson, doping testers arrived at Plainmoor for routine testing and Gottskálksson was chosen to give a sample. On viewing the list of banned substances he fled Torquay, leaving his girlfriend behind without an explanation, and went missing for ten days. In June 2005, the Football Association announced that an independent disciplinary commission had banned Gottskálksson from football indefinitely for failing to take that drugs test.

=== International career ===
He played 10 times for the Iceland national side. His last international match came in February 1998 in a 1–0 Cyprus International Football Tournament defeat against Norway.

== Basketball ==
Ólafur played basketball for seven season in the Icelandic Úrvalsdeild karla, averaging 5.5 points per game for his career. He won the Icelandic Basketball Cup in 1994. He played 4 games for the junior national basketball teams.

=== Honours ===
Keflavík

- Icelandic Basketball Cup: 1994

== Personal life ==
Gottskálksson is the son of goalkeeper Gottskalk Gottskálksson and the brother of goalkeeper Elvar Gottskálksson.

== Legal history ==
In March 2010 Ólafur was sentenced to a ten months prison term in Iceland for housebreaking, robbery and violent attack. In October 2011 he was sentenced to additional four months in prison for similar charges, including serious violence.

On 25 July 2016, he was arrested after a police chase for driving under influences with his five-year-old son in the backseat. He checked into rehab on 4 August but was rushed to the National University Hospital of Iceland two days later due to internal bleeding and broken ribs, injuries he claimed he sustained when the police arrested him.

== Honours ==
Brentford

- Football League Trophy runner-up: 2000–01

== See also ==
- List of sportspeople sanctioned for doping offences
