= Ray Lewington =

English footballer and manager

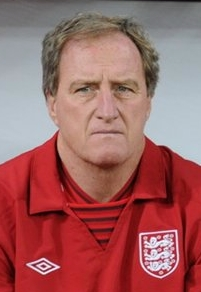
- Lewington with England in 2012

Personal information
- Full name: Raymond Lewington
- Date of birth: 7 September 1956 (age 70)
- Place of birth: Lambeth, England
- Height: 5 ft 6 in (1.68 m)
- Position: Midfielder

Youth career
- Chelsea

Senior career*
Years	Team	Apps	(Gls)
1975–1979	Chelsea	85	(4)
1979	Vancouver Whitecaps	29	(2)
1979–1980	→ Wimbledon (loan)	23	(0)
1980–1985	Fulham	174	(20)
1985–1986	Sheffield United	36	(0)
1986–1990	Fulham	60	(1)
Total		407	(28)

Managerial career
- 1986–1990: Fulham
- 1998: Crystal Palace (caretaker)
- 2000–2001: Brentford
- 2002–2005: Watford
- 2007: Fulham (caretaker)
- 2007–2010: Fulham (assistant)
- 2010: Fulham (caretaker)
- 2010–2011: Fulham (youth development manager)
- 2011–2012: Fulham (first team coach)
- 2012–2016: England (assistant)
- 2017–2021: Crystal Palace (assistant)
- 2022: Watford (assistant)
- 2023–2024: Crystal Palace (first team coach)
- * Club domestic league appearances and goals

Raymond Lewington (born 7 September 1956) is an English football manager and former player.

Born in London, he started his playing career in the city at Chelsea. He went on to play for Vancouver Whitecaps, Wimbledon, Sheffield United, and had two spells at Fulham, for whom he made 234 Football League appearances. In his second spell at Fulham Lewington was player-manager.

Following the end of his time as a player he has spent most of the rest of his career as a coach or assistant manager, with spells at Crystal Palace and Fulham, as well as the England national football team. Outside of positions acting as caretaker, he has also been first team manager at Brentford and Watford.

== Playing career ==
Lewington started his career at Chelsea in the 1970s, and played a season at Vancouver Whitecaps in 1979 where he was part of the Whitecaps' championship squad that won the NASL Soccer Bowl '79, before a loan spell at Wimbledon.

In 1980, he transferred to Fulham, and he was to go on and make over 170 League appearances for them before a season at Sheffield United in 1985–86. After that season he returned to Fulham and went on to play another 60 league matches for them.

== Managerial career ==
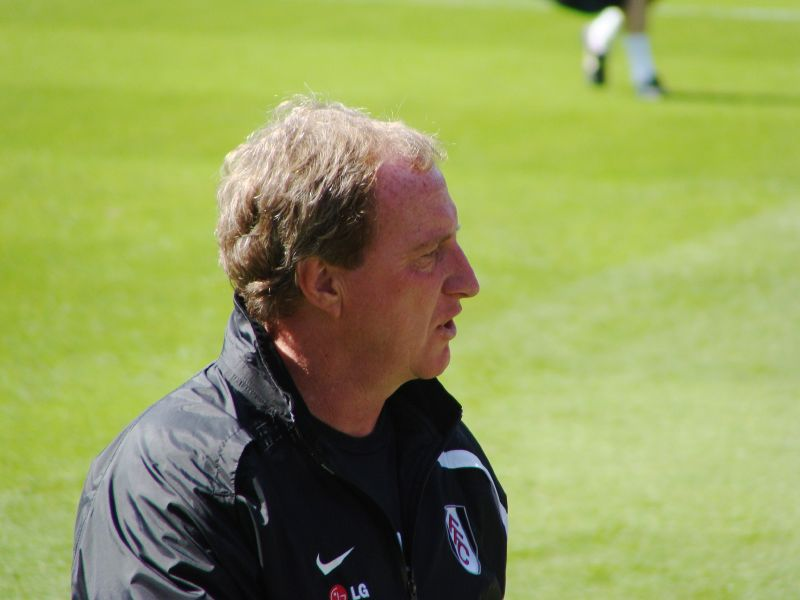
Lewington with Fulham in 2009

Lewington became player-manager of Fulham after they were relegated to the Football League Third Division in July 1986. Lewington, still only 29, was the youngest manager in the Football League at the time. Fulham's budget was tight and they could only manage an 18th-place finish in Lewington's first season as manager. Off the field, the club was unstable after two takeovers in quick succession and the suggestion of a merger with their West London rivals Queens Park Rangers.

The next two seasons showed no sign of an up-turn in fortune, but in 1989, Lewington guided the club to the play-offs, although they were unsuccessful in achieving promotion. The following season saw the club struggle against relegation once more. At the end of that season, Alan Dicks was brought in, with Lewington becoming his assistant.

Lewington had spells as caretaker manager at Fulham in 1991 and 1994, before joining Crystal Palace as a coach, becoming assistant to Alan Smith as Palace were relegated from the Premiership. Brentford were taken over by former Palace owner Ron Noades in 1998, Brentford's "chairman-manager" brought in Lewington as a coach. After Noades relinquished his team-selection duties in 2000, Lewington was appointed as manager of Brentford, taking them to a losing appearance in the Football League Trophy final in 2001 and guiding them to 14th in Division Two. He left at the end of the 2000–01 season to become Gianluca Vialli's reserve team manager at Watford: a difficult role, as Vialli never let any first-team players play for the reserve side.

When Vialli was dismissed in the summer 2002, Lewington was appointed manager during a period when the club had an extremely limited budget after the collapse of ITV Digital and the high-spending of the Vialli era, which had failed to result in promotion to the Premier League. Despite this, Lewington guided the club to two middle table finishes and two cup semi-finals—a 2–1 loss to Southampton in the FA Cup in 2003 and a 2–0 loss (over two legs) to Liverpool in the League Cup two seasons later. Just two months after the Liverpool game, Lewington was dismissed, after a poor run of league form.

In July 2005, Lewington returned to Fulham after ten years away, as reserve team manager, under manager Chris Coleman. By this time, Fulham were an established Premier League club with healthy finances. In December 2007, Lewington served a brief stint as caretaker manager after the departure of Lawrie Sanchez, managing the team for three games until Roy Hodgson was appointed full-time. He remained at Craven Cottage as part of the management team as assistant manager. He was replaced as assistant manager by Mark Bowen when Mark Hughes became manager and became the first team coach.

On 17 October 2010, it was announced on the Fulham website that Lewington had been given the job of leading the club's youth development programme and that taking his position as first team coach would be Glyn Hodges.

Mark Hughes resigned after the end of the 2010–11 season and his successor Martin Jol reinstated Lewington as first team coach in June 2011, alongside Jol's assistants Michael Lindeman and Cornelius Jol. Jol said: "We started off with him because he's probably a main figure here, at this club, he knows everything."

On 4 May 2012, it was confirmed that Lewington would become England assistant manager alongside Roy Hodgson, who had just accepted the FA's offer to manage the England team, having previously managed West Bromwich Albion. On 27 June 2016 he resigned as part of the England coaching staff after the defeat to Iceland in Euro 2016.

On 12 September 2017, following the appointment of Hodgson as manager of Crystal Palace, it was announced that Lewington would once again return to the club as assistant manager. When Hodgson stepped down at the end of the 2020–21 season, Lewington also left his position.

In March 2023, Lewington returned to Crystal Palace for a third spell in the role of first-team coach, following the appointment of Hodgson on a short-term contract until the end of the season, the duo staying on for the 2023–24 season having successfully helped the club avoid relegation. His departure from the club was announced on 21 February 2024, two days after Hodgson's resignation.

== Personal life ==
One of Lewington's sons, Dean, is a professional footballer who played for Milton Keynes Dons and is their longest serving player . His other son, Craig, has played for a number of non-league sides. Lewington's nephew Luke Ayling currently plays for Championship team Middlesbrough FC.

== Honours ==
=== As a manager ===
Brentford

- Football League Trophy runner-up: 2000–01
