= Lloyd Owusu =

English-Ghanaian footballer

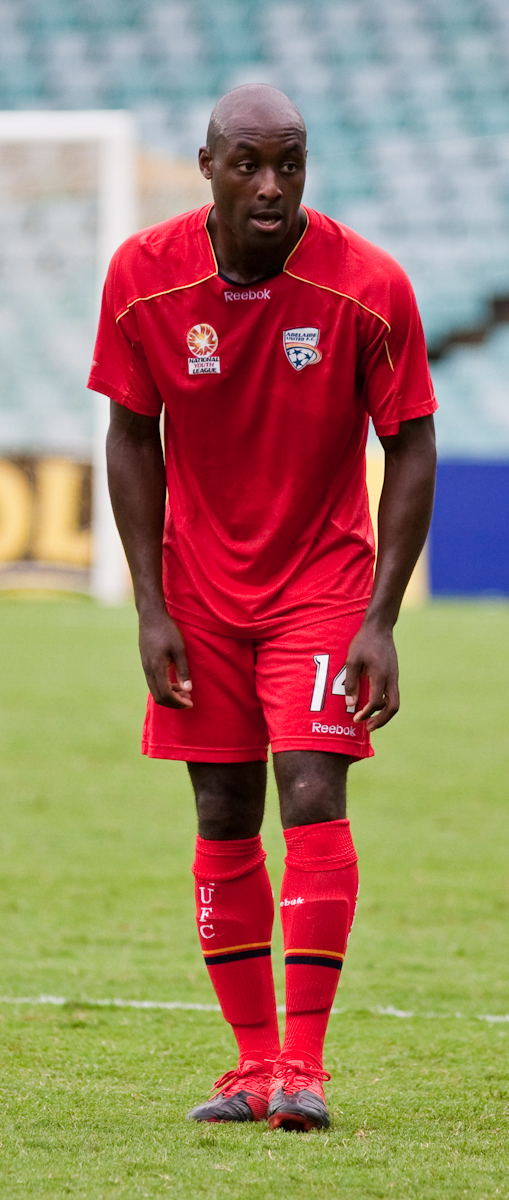
- Owusu playing for Adelaide United Youth in 2009

Personal information
- Full name: Lloyd Magnus Owusu
- Date of birth: 12 December 1976 (age 49)
- Place of birth: Slough, England
- Position: Striker

Youth career
- Slough Town

Senior career*
Years	Team	Apps	(Gls)
1997–1998	Slough Town	47	(18)
1998–2002	Brentford	166	(63)
2002–2004	Sheffield Wednesday	51	(10)
2003–2004	→ Reading (loan)	12	(4)
2004–2005	Reading	29	(10)
2005–2007	Brentford	49	(14)
2007–2008	Yeovil Town	47	(11)
2008–2009	Cheltenham Town	18	(8)
2009	→ Brighton & Hove Albion (loan)	14	(7)
2009–2010	Adelaide United	16	(1)
2011	Luton Town	15	(7)
2011	AEP Paphos	0	(0)
2011	Barnet	5	(0)
2011	→ Hayes & Yeading United (loan)	4	(0)
2012	Slough Town	6	(2)
2012–2013	White City	42	(22)
2014	Hakoah Sydney City East	23	(22)
2015–2016	Rydalmere Lions	34	(16)
2017	Stanmore Hawks	12	(5)
Total		590	(220)

International career
2005	Ghana	4	(0)
- * Club domestic league appearances and goals

Lloyd Magnus Owusu (born 12 December 1976) is a retired professional footballer who last played for Hakoah Sydney City East in the NSW State League Division One, Sydney, Australia. After a move from non-League Slough Town, his career took off at Brentford, where he scored 48 goals in 163 league games between 1998 and 2002. He then moved to Sheffield Wednesday, and two years later transferred to Reading following a short loan spell. He returned to Brentford in 2005, and two years later signed with Yeovil Town. In 2008, he moved to Cheltenham Town, and also had a loan spell at Brighton & Hove Albion the following year.

In 2009, he moved Australia to play for Adelaide United, but left the club in December 2010. Following this he spent a brief period with Luton Town back in England, before heading to Cyprus to play for AEP Paphos. He then returned to England having spells at Barnet and a loan spell at Hayes & Yeading United. In February 2012, he made a nostalgic return to his first club Slough Town to try to help them achieve promotion from the Southern Football League Division One Central.

Born in England, he represented Ghana at international level.

== Playing career ==
=== Brentford ===
Owusu started his career at non-league side Slough Town before being signed by then–Brentford manager Ron Noades in 1998. Owusu was an instant success, scoring 25 goals in all competitions, leading the Third Division scoring charts.

He was less successful in the 1999–2000 campaign, scoring 14 goals in all competitions.

During the 2000–01 season, he scored 12 goals in 34 games. He returned to form with a bang in 2001–02, scoring 22 goals – one of these came against Blackpool in a 3–1 win on March, winning him a Goal of the Month award. His excellent form helped the Bees to reach the Second Division play-off final at the Millennium Stadium, where they lost 2–0 to Stoke City.

=== Sheffield Wednesday ===
Out of contact Owusu was targeted by Oldham Athletic and Crystal Palace, but instead signed to Championship side Sheffield Wednesday on a three-year deal. Lloyd became an instant Wednesday hero when after sixty seconds into his debut as a substitute in a fierce derby match against Sheffield United, he placed a header past Blades keeper Paddy Kenny for the opening goal of a 2–0 win. However, he did not really break into the first team, starting the majority of his 33 appearances from the bench in the 2002–03 season, finishing the season with a disappointing total of four goals.

He continued to be used sparingly in the 2003–04 season, and was signed on loan by Steve Coppell's Reading in December 2003. He enjoyed his time at the Madejski Stadium, and was eager to join the Royals permanently so as to secure regular first team football. He got his wish as the loan move became permanent in the summer of 2004, Reading paying the Owls an undisclosed fee.

In the 2004–05 season, Owusu finished with an impressive record of six goals in fourteen league starts, though once again he was mostly a substitute player.

=== Brentford ===
Brentford manager Martin Allen signed Owusu on a free transfer in the summer of 2005, handing Owusu a two-year contract he stressed that Owusu was signed not due to his popularity at the club but on footballing ability alone. He scored fourteen goals in 42 games in all competitions in 2005–06.

He missed most of the 2006–07 season with injury, and had to undergo multiple operations. Owusu finally made his comeback for Brentford against Rotherham in a 1–0 defeat at Griffin Park on 17 March 2007, nearly scoring with his first touch. His comeback was to prove short-lived though, as he was released two months later.

=== Yeovil Town ===
In July 2007 he signed a one-year contract with Russell Slade's Yeovil Town. Top-scorer in his first season at the club, he announced he was happy to continue at Huish Park despite interest from other clubs.

=== Cheltenham Town ===
However, in September 2008, Owusu joined League One side Cheltenham Town for free, on a one-year deal. In March 2009, Cheltenham allowed to Owusu to join Brighton & Hove Albion on loan until the end of the season after the club were forced to cut costs. Owusu scored seven goals in fourteen league appearances for Brighton, ensuring they avoided relegation from League One and as a result he was named as the League One Player of the Month for April 2009. Seventeen Brighton players were out of contact at the season's end, however Owusu was one of only three of these players to be offered a new contract. He did not accept the offer.

=== Adelaide United ===
In June 2009, Owusu signed for Australian A-League side Adelaide United on a two-year deal. His new career at the Australian club was dealt a blow when his pre-season conditioning was hampered by the contraction of swine flu and pneumonia. He made his debut for the Australian club on 21 August 2009, as a 58th-minute substitute for Daniel Mullen. He scored his first goal for Adelaide in a 3–3 draw to North Queensland at Hindmarsh Stadium the following week.

After a poor season and being dropped to the youth team, Owusu went for a one-week trial for Chinese Super League club Guangzhou Evergrande. Owusu failed to make an impact at Adelaide and had his contract terminated by mutual consent at the end of December 2010. He quickly returned to England to join League Two club Port Vale on trial. Port Vale wished to sign him in early January 2011, but came up against registration issues with Adelaide. New manager Jim Gannon then said that he would not be signing Owusu.

=== Luton ===
Owusu was linked with League Two side Gillingham in mid-January 2011, but he instead opted to sign for Conference Premier side Luton Town on 18 January, signing a contract until May 2011. He made his debut and scored his first goal for the club that evening in a 5–0 victory against York City. On 2 June 2011, Owusu was released by Luton. He had made 15 appearances, scoring 7 goals.

He began the 2011–12 season training with Micky Adams' Port Vale. However, he again left the UK, this time settling with AEP Paphos in the Cypriot Second Division.

=== Barnet ===
On 12 September 2011, Owusu returned to England and signed for League Two side Barnet on a short-term deal. He made his debut the following day coming on as sub for Charlie Taylor in the 2–0 home win over Plymouth Argyle.

On 4 November 2011, Owusu joined Conference Premier side Hayes & Yeading United on a one-month loan deal. On 15 December 2011, soon after he returned from this loan spell, it was reported that he had left Barnet at the expiry of his contract.

=== White City Woodville ===
On 23 March 2012, Owusu returned to Australia to join FFSA Premier League side White City Woodville.

=== Hakoah Sydney City East ===
On 15 November 2012, it was announced that Owusu would be signing a one-year deal to join Indonesian Super League side Pelita Bandung Raya as assistant manager and player. However, this transfer fell through. Upon returning to Australia, he signed for Hakoah Sydney City East FC in the NSW State League Division One. Here, he helped the club to a Round of 32 position in the inaugural FFA Cup where they lost to Palm Beach SC from Queensland. In his only season for Hakoah, Owusu would go on to score 18 goals in 23 league appearances for the club, helping them win promotion to the National Premier Leagues NSW 2.

== International career ==
Owusu earned his first cap for Ghana in 2005, and was hopeful of playing in the 2006 FIFA World Cup, the first World Cup which his country had qualified for. However, on 26 April, in a rare appearance for Ghana, Owusu tore his groin in a half during a friendly match against VfB Stuttgart. As a result, he was out injured for the World Cup, and so was not selected in the Ghana squad.

In January 2015, he announced his retirement aged 38 after a career spanning 17 years.

== Coaching career ==
Following the announcement of his retirement as a player, Lloyd Owusu joined the International Football School, Australia located in Kariong, New South Wales After his professional career, he has become General Duties Master at Cranbrook School in Sydney, Australia.

== Personal life ==
Owusu was appointed General Duties Master and Head Coach of 1st XI at the Cranbrook School in Bellevue Hill, Sydney, Australia. He is a cousin of professional footballers Derek Asamoah and Ansah Owusu. He has since sought citizenship in Australia.

== Honours ==
Brentford

- Football League Third Division: 1998–99
- Football League Trophy runner-up: 2000–01

Individual

- Brentford Hall of Fame
