= Jay Lovett =

English footballer (born 1978)

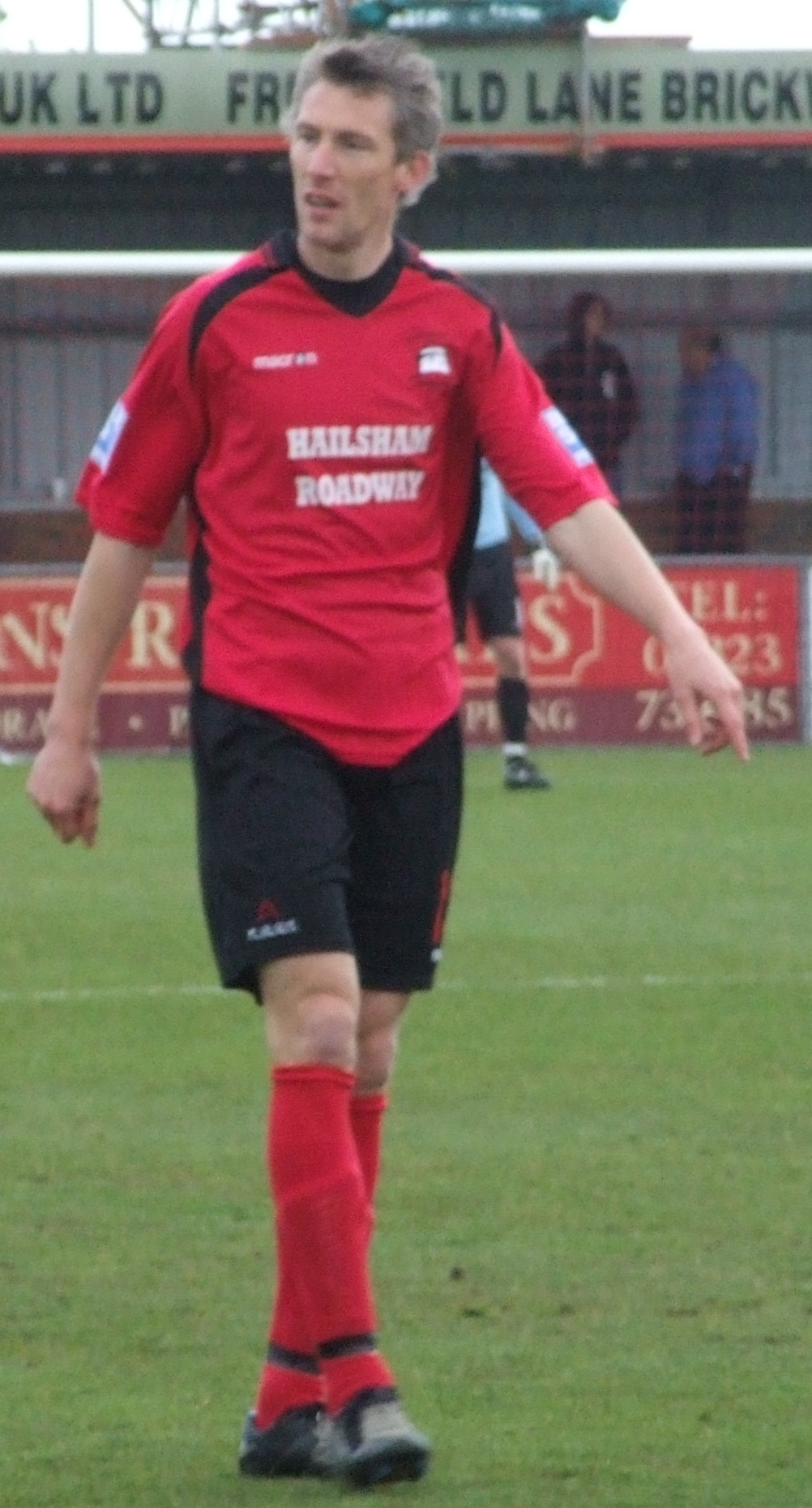
- Lovett playing for Eastbourne Borough

Personal information
- Full name: Jay Lovett
- Date of birth: 2 January 1978 (age 48)
- Place of birth: Brighton, England
- Position: Full back

Senior career*
| Years | Team | Apps | (Gls) |
| 1995 | Lewes | | |
| 1995–1997 | Plymouth Argyle | 0 | (0) |
| 1997–1998 | Saltdean United | | |
| 1998–2000 | Crawley Town | 80 | (7) |
| 2000–2003 | Brentford | 75 | (1) |
| 2001–2002 | → Crawley Town (loan) | 9 | (0) |
| 2003 | → Hereford United (loan) | 10 | (1) |
| 2003 | → Gravesend & Northfleet (loan) | 5 | (0) |
| 2003 | Farnborough Town | 9 | (0) |
| 2003–2006 | Lewes | 98 | (7) |
| 2004 | → Aldershot Town (loan) | 1 | (0) |
| 2006–2009 | Eastbourne Borough | 149 | (7) |
| 2009–2010 | Whitehawk | 31 | (2) |
| 2010 | Horsham | | |
| 2010–2011 | Tooting & Mitcham United | | |
| 2012 | Metropolitan Police | | |
| 2013–2014 | Lewes | 39 | (4) |
| 2014–2015 | Eastbourne Borough | 7 | (0) |
| 2014–2015 | → Met Police (dual registration) | 28 | (2) |
| 2015 | Lewes | 14 | (3) |
| 2015–2016 | Metropolitan Police | 25 | (0) |
| 2016 | Burgess Hill Town | 0 | (0) |
| 2016 | Loxwood | | |
| 2019 | South Park | 1 | (0) |

Managerial career
- 2018–2019: South Park
- 2019–2023: Burgess Hill Town
- 2023: Haywards Heath Town
- 2024–2026: Burgess Hill Town
- 2026: Whitehawk
- * Club domestic league appearances and goals

Jay Lovett (born 2 January 1978) is an English football manager and former player who was most recently the manager of Whitehawk.

He spent his career playing in league football as a defender and midfielder with Brentford and also non-League football in both county level, with Saltdean United, and in national level where he has played for the majority of his career with Crawley Town and Eastbourne Borough.

== Playing career ==
=== Early career ===
Lovett started his career in East Sussex for Lewes, making his debut for them 11 February 1995 as they lost 4–0 away at Leighton Town in Isthmian League Division Three. Later that year he moved to the west country and Plymouth Argyle in Devon but was unable to start a first team game, after which he moved back to Sussex and played for Saltdean United in Division One of the Sussex County League. He also spent time youth coaching at the University of Central Florida. A season later he moved to Crawley Town in 1998 and played for two seasons. Second Division team Brentford took interest in Lovett, after watching him in a pre-season friendly and paid Crawley their record sum of £60,000 for the midfielder in July 2000, with a further £15,000 to be paid after 15 appearances.

=== Brentford ===
In his first year at Brentford he was back on loan to Crawley Town for nine games before making 28 appearances for the first team. In 2003, Lovett went out on loan twice more, firstly at Hereford United where he played for two months, and a month at Gravesend & Northfleet, before his contract expired at the end of the 2002–03 season.

=== Non-League football ===
Farnborough Town manager, Tommy Taylor signed Lovett in June, although he played nine games, he transferred to Lewes later in the year. In 2004, Aldershot Town signed Lovett on a month loan.

Lovett joined Sussex rivals Eastbourne Borough in June 2006. He spent the end of their 2006–07 campaign with a broken collarbone, but helped the team win promotion into the Conference National league at the end of the 2007–08 season via the Conference South play-off final against Hampton & Richmond Borough, the game ending 2–0.

He played in Eastbourne's first ever season in the Conference National, scoring two goals and helping to win the Sussex Senior Cup in a 1–0 win over Brighton & Hove Albion reserves, before being released in May 2009 failing to agree to a new deal with the club, scoring seven goals in 149 appearances.

At the start of the 2009–10 season, Lovett signed for Whitehawk despite having offers from clubs in higher divisions, such as Grays Athletic in the Conference National, Havant & Waterlooville in the Conference South and Worthing in Isthmian League Division One South.

In June 2010, Lovett signed for Isthmian League Premier Division club Horsham.

Failing to hold down a regular starting berth at Horsham, Lovett joined fellow Isthmian League club Tooting & Mitcham United in October 2010. During his spell at Imperial Fields, Lovett was made the club captain and was instrumental in ensuring that Tooting & Mitcham avoided relegation. In March 2011, Lovett left Tooting & Mitcham in order to take up a position as assistant manager with Vietnamese V-League side Đồng Tâm Long An, working as assistant to Simon McMenemy.

After a full season with Lewes in 2013–14, he re-signed as a player for Eastbourne Borough ahead of the 2014–15 season, already being a full-time academy manager there. A dual registration deal between The Sports and Metropolitan Police materialised on 14 October 2014.

On 23 May 2015, Lovett returned to Lewes to become the club's new assistant manager and academy director, and in June he also registered as player.

On 19 October 2015, he signed for a third spell with Metropolitan Police, as an assistant manager/player.

He started the 2016–17 as an unused substitute in the two opening league games for Burgess Hill Town, before signing for Loxwood in September.

While being the manager of South Park, he made comeback as a player in the final game of the Isthmian League South Central Division 2018–19 season. He was named the manager of Burgess Hill Town of the South East Division in November 2019.

Lovett was sacked by Burgess Hill Town on 15 February 2023 and less than a week later appointed manager by Haywards Heath Town on 21 February 2023.

Lovett left Haywards Heath Town on 16 October 2023 having received a coaching opportunity with Eastbourne Borough.

On 28 May 2024, Lovett returned to Burgess Hill Town as joint manager with Gary Mansell.

On 2 April 2026, Lovett left his position as joint manager at Burgess Hill Town leaving Gary Mansell in sole charge.

On 4 June 2026, Lovett was appointed manager at Whitehawk.

On 15 October 2026, Lovett stood down as manager of Whitehawk.

== Personal life ==
Lovett attended Dorothy Stringer High School and Varndean College. While a player with Saltdean United, he worked as an IT recruiter and at the time he joined Brentford in July 2000, was working for TSB. He is a Chelsea supporter.

== Honours ==
Brentford

- Football League Trophy runner-up: 2000–01

Eastbourne Borough

- Conference South play-offs: 2008
- Sussex Senior Cup: 2009

Whitehawk

- Sussex County League Division 1: 2009–10
