= Michael Black (footballer) =

English footballer (born 1976)

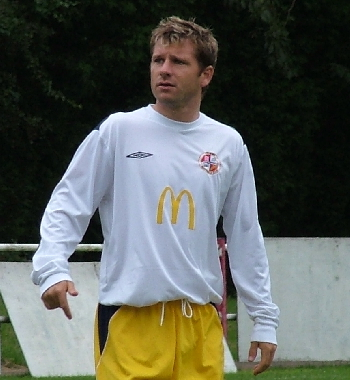
- Black warming up for Tilbury in 2009.

Personal information
- Full name: Michael James Black
- Date of birth: 6 October 1976 (age 50)
- Place of birth: Chigwell, England
- Height: 5 ft 8 in (1.73 m)
- Positions: Midfielder; forward

Youth career
- 1993–1997: Arsenal

Senior career*
Years	Team	Apps	(Gls)
1997–1999	Arsenal	0	(0)
1997	→ Brentford (loan)	0	(0)
1997–1998	→ Millwall (loan)	13	(2)
1999–2001	Tranmere Rovers	22	(0)
2000–2001	→ Southend United (loan)	3	(0)
2001	Southend United	12	(1)
2001–2003	Barking & East Ham United		
2003	Bishop's Stortford	7	(0)
2003	Barking & East Ham United	3	(0)
2003–2004	Billericay Town	23	(2)
2004–2005	Cheshunt	20	(0)
2005–2006	Boreham Wood	44	(4)
2006	Enfield Town	7	(0)
2006–2007	Potters Bar Town	33	(1)
2007–2008	Billericay Town	19	(0)
2008–2009	Tilbury	35	(2)
Total		238	(12)

International career
1992	England Schoolboys	5	(0)
- * Club domestic league appearances and goals

Michael James Black (born 6 October 1976) is an English former professional footballer who played as a midfielder and forward. After beginning his career in the Arsenal academy, he played in the Football League for Tranmere Rovers and Southend United, before dropping into non-League football in 2002.

== Club career ==
=== Arsenal ===
Black began his career as a trainee Arsenal academy in 1993 and was later joined in the academy by his brother Tommy. He won the 1994 FA Youth Cup with the youth team and received a first team squad number for the 1997–98 season. Black joined Second Division club Brentford on a one-month loan on 29 August 1997. He failed to make an appearance for the club and joined Second Division club Millwall on a three-month loan on 3 October 1997. He made his debut the following day, playing the full 90 minutes of a 2–1 victory over Blackpool and scored the first senior goal of his career in the following game, with the winner in a 2–1 victory over Oldham Athletic. Black made 14 appearances and scored two goals before returning to Arsenal on 3 January 1998.

Black made his only senior appearance for Arsenal in a UEFA Champions League group stage match against Panathinaikos on 9 December 1998, when he replaced Alberto Méndez after 78 minutes of the 3–1 win. Black was released by the Gunners at the end of the 1998–99 season.

=== Tranmere Rovers ===
Black signed a permanent contract with First Division club Tranmere Rovers in July 1999. He made 27 appearances during the 1999–00 season and was an unused substitute during the 2–1 2000 League Cup Final defeat to Leicester City. Black failed to make an appearance for Tranmere during the 2000–01 season and departed the club on 31 January 2001.

=== Southend United ===
Black joined Third Division club Southend United on a one-month loan on 29 December 2000 and after three appearances, his loan was made permanent on 31 January 2001. He made 16 appearances and scored one goal during the 2000–01 season. After failing to agree terms over a new contract, Black left the club during the 2001 off-season.

=== Barking & East Ham United ===
Following persistent trouble with a knee ligament problem (which caused potential moves to Chesterfield and Queens Park Rangers to fall through), Black joined Isthmian League First Division club Barking & East Ham United during the early months of the 2001–02 season. After returning to fitness, Black was awarded the captaincy and won the club's Supporters' Player of the Year award. He signed new contract in April 2002 and left the club at the end of the 2002–03 season.

=== Bishop's Stortford ===
Black signed for Isthmian League Premier Division club Bishop's Stortford during the 2003 off-season. Utilised as a substitute or rarely completing 90 minutes when given a start, Black made only seven appearances for the club before departing in late October 2003.

=== Return to Barking & East Ham United ===
Black re-signed for Barking & East Ham United in late October 2003. He made three appearances before leaving the club on 8 November. During his two spells with the club, Black made 91 appearances and scored 15 goals.

=== Billericay Town ===
Black joined Isthmian League Premier Division club Billericay Town in early November 2003. He made 23 appearances and scored two goals during the 2003–04 season and departed the Blues at the end of the campaign.

=== Cheshunt ===
Black signed for Isthmian League Premier Division club Cheshunt in August 2004. He made 20 appearances during his time with the Ambers.

=== Boreham Wood ===
Black signed for Southern League Eastern Division club Boreham Wood in January 2005. He was one of a mass exodus of Cheshunt staff to sign for the Wood, which included 10 players and manager Andy Leese. Remaining with the club for the 2005–06 season, Black made the highest seasonal appearance and goalscoring totals of his career so far, with 46 appearances and six goals. In a successful season, the Wood reached the FA Trophy semi-finals and won the Southern League First Division East championship. He left the club at the end of the 2005–06 season.

=== Enfield Town ===
Black signed for Isthmian League First Division North club Enfield Town prior to the start of the 2006–07 season. His time with the club was fleeting and he made his eighth and final appearance in a 0–0 draw with Aveley on 23 September.

=== Potters Bar Town ===
Black joined Isthmian League First Division North club Potters Bar Town in November 2006. In a mediocre season for the club, he made 33 appearances and scored one goal.

=== Return to Billericay Town ===
Black moved back up to the Isthmian League Premier Division to re-sign for Billericay Town in November 2007. He made 19 appearances and scored no goals during what remained of the 2007–08 season and was released at the end of the campaign.

=== Tilbury ===
Black signed for Isthmian League First Division North club Tilbury during the 2008 off-season. He won the second piece of silverware of his career when he played in the 2–0 2009 Isthmian League Cup Final win over Harrow Borough on 8 April. During the course of the 2008–09 season, Black made 44 appearances and five goals. He departed the club during the 2009 off-season, citing work commitments.

=== Hutton Old Boys ===
Black joined Essex Saturday Veterans League Premier Division club Hutton Old Boys in 2012 and won the league title and the Essex Saturday Veterans Cup during the 2013–14 season. He made 12 appearances and scored five goals during the 2013–14 season. He won further Veterans Cups, as both player and manager, in the 2014–15, 2015–16 and 2017–18 seasons.

== International career ==
Black won five caps for England Schoolboys at international level.

== Career statistics ==
Appearances and goals by club, season and competition
Club	Season	League			FA Cup		League Cup		Europe		Other		Total	
Club	Season	Division	Apps	Goals	Apps	Goals	Apps	Goals	Apps	Goals	Apps	Goals	Apps	Goals
Arsenal	1998–99	Premier League	0	0	0	0	0	0	1 (Note: Appearance in UEFA Champions League)	0	—		1	0
Millwall (loan)	1997–98	Second Division	14	2	0	0	—		—		—		14	2
Tranmere Rovers	1999–00	First Division	22	0	0	0	5	1	—		—		27	1
Southend United	2000–01	Third Division	15	1	—		—		—		1 (Note: Appearance in Football League Trophy)	0	16	1
Bishop's Stortford	2003–04	Isthmian League Premier Division	7	0	0	0	—		—		0	0	7	0
Barking & East Ham United	2003–04	Isthmian League First Division North	3	0	—		—		—		—		3	0
Billericay Town	2003–04	Isthmian League Premier Division	23	2	—		—		—		—		23	2
Cheshunt	2004–05	Isthmian League Premier Division	20	0	0	0	—		—		0	0	20	0
Boreham Wood	2005–06	Southern League First Division East	38	4	0	0	—		—		3 (Note: Appearances in FA Trophy)	1	41	5
Enfield Town	2006–07	Isthmian League First Division North	7	0	—		—		—		1 (Note: Appearance in Isthmian League Cup)	0	8	0
Potters Bar Town	2006–07	Isthmian League First Division North	33	1	—		—		—		—		33	1
Billericay Town	2007–08	Isthmian League Premier Division	19	0	0	0	—		—		0	0	19	0
Billericay Town	Total		42	2	0	0	—		—		0	0	42	2
Tilbury	2008–09	Isthmian League First Division North	35	2	1	0	—		—		8 (Note: 5 appearances and 2 goals in Isthmian League Cup, 3 appearances and 1 goal in FA Trophy)	3	44	5
Career total			201	12	1	0	5	1	1	0	13	4	221	17

== Honours ==
Arsenal

- FA Youth Cup: 1993–94

Tranmere Rovers

- Football League Cup runner-up: 1999–2000

Boreham Wood

- Southern League First Division East: 2005–06

Tilbury

- Isthmian League Cup: 2008–09

Hutton Old Boys

- Essex Veterans League Premier Division: 2012–13
- Essex Saturday Veterans Cup: 2013–14

Individual

- Barking & East Ham United Supporters' Player of the Year: 2001–02
