= 2004–05 Southern Football League =

The 2004–05 season was the 102nd in the history of the Southern League, which is an English football competition featuring semi-professional and amateur clubs from the East Midlands, West Midlands, East, South East and South West England.

Also, it was the first season after the creation of the Conference North and South, one step above the Southern League. Therefore, it was the inaugural season for the league at the seventh and eighth tiers in the English league system.

== Premier Division ==
After the creation of the Conference North and South placed above the Southern League, most of the previous season clubs were transferred to the newly created divisions.

Histon won the Premier Division and get a second promotion in a row along with play-off winners Hednesford Town. Hemel Hempstead, Dunstable, Stamford and Solihull Moors were relegated and returned to Division One.

=== League formation ===
The Premier Division featured only six clubs from the previous season and 16 new clubs:

- Six clubs remained in the league:
  - Bath City
  - Chippenham Town
  - Grantham Town
  - Hednesford Town
  - Merthyr Tydfil
  - Tiverton Town
- Six clubs promoted from the Western Division:
  - Cirencester Town
  - Gloucester City
  - Halesowen Town
  - Rugby United
  - Solihull Borough
  - Team Bath
- Four clubs promoted from the Eastern Division:
  - Banbury United
  - Histon
  - King's Lynn
  - Stamford
- Three clubs transferred from Isthmian League Premier Division:
  - Aylesbury United
  - Bedford Town
  - Hitchin Town
- Three clubs promoted from Isthmian League Division One North:
  - Chesham United
  - Dunstable Town
  - Hemel Hempstead Town

=== League table ===
Southern Football League Premier Division
- Season: 2004–05
- Champions: Histon
- Promoted: Histon; Hednesford Town
- Relegated: Hemel Hempstead Town; Dunstable Town; Stamford; Solihull Borough
- Matches: 462
- Goals: 1,391 (3.01 per match)

Pos	Team	Pld	W	D	L	GF	GA	GD	Pts	Promotion or relegation
1	Histon	42	24	6	12	93	57	+36	78	Promoted to the Conference South
2	Chippenham Town	42	22	9	11	81	55	+26	75	Qualified for the play-offs
3	Merthyr Tydfil	42	19	14	9	62	47	+15	71	Qualified for the play-offs
4	Hednesford Town	42	20	10	12	68	40	+28	70	Qualified for the play-offs, then promoted to the Conference North
5	Bedford Town	42	19	12	11	70	52	+18	69	Qualified for the play-offs
6	Bath City	42	19	12	11	57	43	+14	69	
7	Cirencester Town	42	19	11	12	63	52	+11	68	
8	Tiverton Town	42	18	13	11	70	55	+15	67	
9	Halesowen Town	42	19	9	14	64	52	+12	66	
10	Aylesbury United	42	20	3	19	67	66	+1	63	
11	King's Lynn	42	19	4	19	78	69	+9	61	
12	Chesham United	42	18	5	19	84	82	+2	59	
13	Grantham Town	42	17	7	18	57	55	+2	58	
14	Team Bath	42	14	12	16	54	68	−14	54	
15	Gloucester City	42	12	17	13	63	61	+2	53	
16	Rugby United	42	13	12	17	48	60	−12	51	
17	Banbury United	42	13	9	20	56	69	−13	48	
18	Hitchin Town	42	13	9	20	55	77	−22	48	
19	Hemel Hempstead Town	42	11	10	21	60	88	−28	42 (Note: Hemel Hempstead Town deducted 1 point for fielding an ineligible player.)	Relegated to the Western Division
20	Dunstable Town	42	11	6	25	56	98	−42	39	Relegated to the Western Division
21	Stamford	42	6	18	18	40	60	−20	36	Relegated to the Eastern Division
22	Solihull Borough	42	10	4	28	45	85	−40	34	Relegated to the Western Division

Source: fchd.com
Rules for classification: 1) points; 2) goal difference; 3) number of goals scored.

=== Play-offs ===
Semifinals
2	Chippenham Town	2(5)
5	Bedford Town	2(4)
3	Merthyr Tydfil	1(3)
4	Hednesford Town	1(5)

Final
2	Chippenham Town	0
4	Hednesford Town	1

=== Stadia and locations ===
Locations of the Premier Division clubs

Club	Stadium
Aylesbury United	Buckingham Road
Banbury United	Spencer Stadium
Bath City	Twerton Park
Bedford Town	The Eyrie
Chesham United	The Meadow
Chippenham Town	Hardenhuish Park
Cirencester Town	Corinium Stadium
Dunstable Town	Creasey Park
Gloucester City	Meadow Park, Gloucester
Grantham Town	South Kesteven Sports Stadium
Halesowen Town	The Grove
Hednesford Town	Keys Park
Hemel Hempstead Town	Vauxhall Road
Histon	Bridge Road
Hitchin Town	Top Field
King's Lynn	The Walks
Merthyr Tydfil	Penydarren Park
Rugby Town	Butlin Road
Solihull Borough	Damson Park
Stamford	Hanson's Field
Team Bath	Twerton Park (groundshare with Bath City)
Tiverton Town	Ladysmead

== Eastern Division ==
After the creation of the Conference North and South one step above the Southern League, most of the Premier Division clubs were transferred to the newly created divisions. Consequently, most of the Eastern Division clubs took up the empty spots in higher divisions.

Fisher Athletic won the division and were promoted along with runners-up East Thurrock United and play-off winners Maldon Town, who get the second promotion in a row. Erith & Belvedere and Tilbury finished bottom of the league and were relegated.

=== League formation ===
In the first season as an eighth tier league, the Eastern Division featured five clubs from the previous season and 17 new clubs:

- 14 clubs transferred from Isthmian League Division One North:
  - Arlesey Town
  - Aveley
  - Barking & East Ham United
  - Barton Rovers
  - Berkhamsted Town
  - Boreham Wood
  - East Thurrock United
  - Great Wakering Rovers
  - Harlow Town
  - Tilbury
  - Uxbridge
  - Waltham Forest
  - Wingate & Finchley
  - Wivenhoe Town
- Five clubs remained in the league:
  - Chatham Town
  - Dartford
  - Erith & Belvedere
  - Fisher Athletic
  - Sittingbourne
- Plus:
  - Beaconsfield SYCOB, promoted from the Spartan South Midlands League
  - Leighton Town, promoted from the Isthmian League Division Two
  - Maldon Town, promoted from the Eastern Counties League

=== League table ===
Southern Football League Eastern Division
- Season: 2004–05
- Champions: Fisher Athletic
- Promoted: Fisher Athletic; East Thurrock United; Maldon Town
- Relegated: Erith & Belvedere; Tilbury
- Matches: 462
- Goals: 1,434 (3.1 per match)

Pos	Team	Pld	W	D	L	GF	GA	GD	Pts	Promotion or relegation
1	Fisher Athletic	42	30	6	6	96	41	+55	96	Promoted to Isthmian League Premier Division
2	East Thurrock United	42	25	12	5	92	38	+54	87	Promoted to Isthmian League Premier Division
3	Maldon Town	42	27	6	9	92	51	+41	87	Qualified for the play-offs, then promoted to IL Premier Division
4	Uxbridge	42	26	7	9	87	37	+50	85	Qualified for the play-offs
5	Wivenhoe Town	42	21	11	10	74	49	+25	74	Qualified for the play-offs
6	Barking & East Ham United	42	20	10	12	63	37	+26	70	Qualified for the play-offs
7	Boreham Wood	42	19	9	14	80	61	+19	66	
8	Barton Rovers	42	20	4	18	76	72	+4	64	
9	Waltham Forest	42	16	9	17	68	61	+7	57	
10	Leighton Town	42	13	15	14	57	59	−2	54	Transferred to the Western Division
11	Chatham Town	42	15	9	18	53	63	−10	54	
12	Wingate & Finchley	42	15	8	19	60	75	−15	53	
13	Arlesey Town	42	14	10	18	53	67	−14	52	
14	Beaconsfield SYCOB	42	12	12	18	54	65	−11	48	Transferred to the Western Division
15	Harlow Town	42	13	8	21	53	65	−12	47	
16	Dartford	42	11	13	18	58	75	−17	46	
17	Aveley	42	12	9	21	57	69	−12	45	
18	Berkhamsted Town	42	15	7	20	66	101	−35	45 (Note: Berkhamsted Town deducted 7 points for fielding an ineligible player.)	
19	Sittingbourne	42	10	12	20	53	70	−17	42	
20	Great Wakering Rovers	42	9	11	22	45	78	−33	38	
21	Erith & Belvedere	42	11	7	24	56	92	−36	37 (Note: Erith & Belvedere deducted 3 points for fielding an ineligible player.)	Relegated to the Kent League
22	Tilbury	42	6	9	27	41	108	−67	27	Relegated to the Essex Senior League

Source: fchd.com
Rules for classification: 1) points; 2) goal difference; 3) number of goals scored.

=== Play-offs ===
Semifinals
3	Maldon Town	1(3)
6	Barking & East Ham United	1(2)
4	Uxbridge	3
5	Wivenhoe Town	0

Final
3	Maldon Town	2(3)
4	Uxbridge	2(2)

=== Stadia and locations ===
Locations of the Eastern Division clubs
Greater London Eastern Division clubs

Club	Stadium
Arlesey Town	Hitchin Road
Aveley	The Mill Field
Barking & East Ham United	Mayesbrook Park
Barton Rovers	Sharpenhoe Road
Beaconsfield SYCOB	Holloways Park
Berkhamsted	Broadwater
Boreham Wood	Meadow Park
Chatham Town	The Sports Ground
Dartford	Stonebridge Road (groundshare with Gravesend & Northfleet)
East Thurrock United	Rookery Hill
Erith & Belvedere	Park View Road (groundshare with Welling United)
Fisher Athletic	Champion Hill (groundshare with Dulwich Hamlet)
Great Wakering Rovers	Burroughs Park
Harlow Town	Barrows Farm
Leighton Town	Bell Close
Maldon Town	Wallace Binder Ground
Sittingbourne	Bourne Park
Tilbury	Chadfields
Uxbridge	Honeycroft
Waltham Forest	Wadham Lodge
Wingate & Finchley	The Harry Abrahams Stadium
Wivenhoe Town	Broad Lane

== Western Division ==
After the creation of the Conference North and South one step above the Southern League, most of the Premier Division clubs were transferred to the newly created divisions. Consequently, most of the Western Division clubs took up the empty spots in higher divisions.

Mangotsfield United won the division and were promoted to the Premier Division along with runners-up Yate Town and play-off winners Evesham United. Oxford City and Egham Town finished bottom of the table and were relegated.

=== League formation ===
In the first season as an eighth tier league, the Western Division featured eleven clubs from the previous season and eleven new clubs:

- Three clubs transferred from the Eastern Division:
  - Burnham
  - Corby Town
  - Rothwell Town
- Two clubs transferred from Isthmian League Division One North:
  - Oxford City
  - Thame United
- Four clubs transferred from Isthmian League Division One South:
  - Ashford Town (Middlesex)
  - Bracknell Town
  - Egham Town
  - Marlow
- Plus:
  - Brackley Town, promoted from the Hellenic League
  - Paulton Rovers, promoted from the Western League

=== League table ===
Southern Football League Western Division
- Season: 2004–05
- Champions: Mangotsfield United
- Promoted: Mangotsfield United; Yate Town; Evesham United
- Relegated: Oxford City; Egham Town
- Matches: 462
- Goals: 1,316 (2.85 per match)

Pos	Team	Pld	W	D	L	GF	GA	GD	Pts	Promotion or relegation
1	Mangotsfield United	42	24	11	7	89	49	+40	83	Promoted to the Premier Division
2	Yate Town	42	24	9	9	83	40	+43	81	Promoted to the Premier Division
3	Evesham United	42	23	10	9	66	31	+35	79	Qualified for the play-offs, then promoted to the Premier Division
4	Clevedon Town	42	24	6	12	82	49	+33	78	Qualified for the play-offs
5	Bromsgrove Rovers	42	19	15	8	60	42	+18	72	Qualified for the play-offs
6	Ashford Town (Middlesex)	42	17	13	12	63	46	+17	64	Qualified for the play-offs
7	Brackley Town	42	18	10	14	69	53	+16	64	
8	Paulton Rovers	42	18	7	17	62	61	+1	61	
9	Burnham	42	17	7	18	64	64	0	58	
10	Rothwell Town	42	16	10	16	57	57	0	58	Transferred to the Eastern Division
11	Thame United	42	17	6	19	58	69	−11	57	
12	Corby Town	42	14	12	16	52	62	−10	54	Transferred to the Eastern Division
13	Marlow	42	13	14	15	58	67	−9	53	
14	Stourport Swifts	42	15	7	20	62	63	−1	52	
15	Bedworth United	42	15	7	20	51	60	−9	52	
16	Cinderford Town	42	13	12	17	50	64	−14	51	
17	Taunton Town	42	14	8	20	66	75	−9	50	
18	Sutton Coldfield Town	42	16	11	15	54	61	−7	48 (Note: Sutton Coldfield Town deducted 11 points for fielding an ineligible player.)	
19	Swindon Supermarine	42	12	12	18	43	60	−17	48	
20	Bracknell Town	42	10	13	19	53	75	−22	43	
21	Oxford City	42	11	8	23	49	71	−22	41	Relegated to the Spartan South Midlands League
22	Egham Town	42	6	4	32	25	97	−72	22	Relegated to IL Division Two

Source: fchd.com
Rules for classification: 1) points; 2) goal difference; 3) number of goals scored.

=== Play-offs ===
Semifinals
3	Evesham United	2
6	Ashford Town (Middlesex)	1
4	Clevedon Town	2
5	Bromsgrove Rovers	3

Final
3	Evesham United	4
5	Bromsgrove Rovers	0

=== Stadia and locations ===
Locations of the Western Division clubs

Club	Stadium
Ashford Town (Middlesex)	The Robert Parker Stadium
Bedworth United	The Oval
Brackley Town	St. James Park
Bracknell Town	Larges Lane
Bromsgrove Rovers	Victoria Ground
Burnham	The Gore
Cinderford Town	Causeway Ground
Clevedon Town	Hand Stadium
Corby Town	Steel Park
Egham Town	The Runnymede Stadium
Evesham United	Common Road
Mangotsfield United	Cossham Street
Marlow	Alfred Davis Memorial Ground
Oxford City	Court Place Farm
Paulton Rovers	Athletic Field
Rothwell Town	Cecil Street
Stourport Swifts	Walshes Meadow
Sutton Coldfield Town	The Central Ground
Swindon Supermarine	Hunts Copse Ground
Taunton Town	Wordsworth Drive
Thame United	Windmill Road
Yate Town	Lodge Road

== See also ==
- Southern Football League
- 2004–05 Isthmian League
- 2004–05 Northern Premier League
