= 2003–04 Isthmian League =

The 2003–04 season was the 89th season of the Isthmian League, which is an English football competition featuring semi-professional and amateur clubs from London, East and South East England.

It was the last season for the Isthmian League as a feeder for the Conference Premier. At the end of the season, the Premier Division was replaced as a level 6 league (along with the Northern Premier League Premier Division and Southern Football League Premier Division) by the newly formed Conference North and Conference South. The Premier Division lost more than half its clubs to newly formed divisions, and the two regional divisions had a number of their clubs promoted to the Premier Division to replace them. Thus, the Isthmian League divisions downgraded to 7-9 levels.

== Premier Division ==
Isthmian League Premier Division
- Season: 2003–04
- Champions: Canvey Island
- Promoted: Canvey Island
- Matches: 552
- Goals: 1,533 (2.78 per match)
- Top goalscorer: 42 goals – Lee Boylan (Canvey Island)
- Highest attendance: 1,260 – Kettering Town – Bedford Town, (12 April)
- Total attendance: 203,453
- Average attendance: 369 (-14.6% to previous season)

The Premier Division consisted of 24 clubs, including 19 clubs from the previous season and five new clubs:

- Bognor Regis Town, promoted as runners-up in Division One South
- Carshalton Athletic, promoted as champions of Division One South
- Hornchurch, promoted as runners-up in Division One North
- Kettering Town, relegated from the Conference National
- Northwood, promoted as champions of Division One North

Canvey Island won the division and were promoted to the Conference National. Clubs finished higher than 14th position were to transfer to the newly created Conference North and South divisions and clubs finished higher than 21st position plus winners of Division One were to participate in the play-offs for a two final spots in Conference North/South. After play-offs was held Hendon decided not to take up their option to join the Conference, their place was taken by Basingstoke Town. At the end of the season Ford United were renamed Redbridge.

There were no relegation from the Premier Division this season, though, due to league reform, clubs remained in the division downgraded from sixth tier to seventh.

=== League table ===
| Pos | Team | Pld | W | D | L | GF | GA | GD | Pts | Promotion or relegation |
|---|---|---|---|---|---|---|---|---|---|---|
| 1 | Canvey Island | 46 | 32 | 8 | 6 | 106 | 42 | +64 | 104 | Promoted to the Conference National |
| 2 | Sutton United | 46 | 25 | 10 | 11 | 94 | 56 | +38 | 85 | Qualified for the Conference South |
| 3 | Thurrock | 46 | 24 | 11 | 11 | 87 | 45 | +42 | 83 | Qualified for the Conference South |
| 4 | Hendon | 46 | 25 | 8 | 13 | 68 | 47 | +21 | 83 | Declined transfer to the Conference South |
| 5 | Hornchurch | 46 | 24 | 11 | 11 | 63 | 35 | +28 | 82 (Note: Hornchurch deducted one point.) | Qualified for the Conference South |
| 6 | Grays Athletic | 46 | 22 | 15 | 9 | 82 | 39 | +43 | 81 | Qualified for the Conference South |
| 7 | Carshalton Athletic | 46 | 24 | 9 | 13 | 66 | 55 | +11 | 81 | Qualified for the Conference South |
| 8 | Hayes | 46 | 21 | 11 | 14 | 56 | 46 | +10 | 74 | Qualified for the Conference South |
| 9 | Kettering Town | 46 | 20 | 11 | 15 | 63 | 63 | 0 | 71 | Qualified for the Conference North |
| 10 | Bognor Regis Town | 46 | 20 | 10 | 16 | 69 | 67 | +2 | 70 | Qualified for the Conference South |
| 11 | Bishop's Stortford | 46 | 20 | 9 | 17 | 78 | 61 | +17 | 69 | Qualified for the Conference South |
| 12 | Maidenhead United | 46 | 18 | 9 | 19 | 60 | 68 | −8 | 63 | Qualified for the Conference South |
| 13 | Ford United | 46 | 16 | 14 | 16 | 69 | 63 | +6 | 62 | Qualified for the Conference South |
| 14 | Basingstoke Town | 46 | 17 | 9 | 20 | 58 | 64 | −6 | 60 | Qualified for the play-offs, then qualified to the Conference South |
| 15 | Bedford Town | 46 | 14 | 13 | 19 | 62 | 63 | −1 | 55 | Qualified for the play-offs, then transferred to the Southern Football League |
| 16 | Heybridge Swifts | 46 | 14 | 11 | 21 | 57 | 78 | −21 | 53 | Qualified for the play-offs |
| 17 | Harrow Borough | 46 | 12 | 14 | 20 | 47 | 63 | −16 | 50 | Qualified for the play-offs |
| 18 | Kingstonian | 46 | 12 | 13 | 21 | 40 | 56 | −16 | 49 | Qualified for the play-offs |
| 19 | St Albans City | 46 | 12 | 12 | 22 | 55 | 83 | −28 | 48 | Qualified for the play-offs, then qualified to the Conference South |
| 20 | Hitchin Town | 46 | 13 | 8 | 25 | 55 | 89 | −34 | 47 | Qualified for the play-offs, then transferred to the Southern Football League |
| 21 | Northwood | 46 | 12 | 9 | 25 | 65 | 95 | −30 | 45 | |
| 22 | Billericay Town | 46 | 11 | 11 | 24 | 51 | 66 | −15 | 44 | |
| 23 | Braintree Town | 46 | 11 | 6 | 29 | 41 | 88 | −47 | 39 | |
| 24 | Aylesbury United | 46 | 5 | 14 | 27 | 41 | 101 | −60 | 29 | Transferred to the Southern Football League |

Rules for classification: 1) points; 2) goal difference; 3) number of goals scored.

=== Stadia and locations ===
Locations of the Premier Division clubs
Greater London Premier Division football clubs

| Club | Stadium |
|---|---|
| Aylesbury United | Buckingham Road |
| Basingstoke Town | The Camrose |
| Bedford Town | The Eyrie |
| Billericay Town | New Lodge |
| Bishop's Stortford | Woodside Park |
| Bognor Regis Town | Nyewood Lane |
| Braintree Town | Cressing Road |
| Canvey Island | Brockwell Stadium |
| Carshalton Athletic | War Memorial Sports Ground |
| Ford United | Oakside |
| Grays Athletic | New Recreation Ground |
| Harrow Borough | Earlsmead Stadium |
| Hayes | Church Road |
| Hendon | Claremont Road |
| Heybridge Swifts | Scraley Road |
| Hitchin Town | Top Field |
| Hornchurch | Hornchurch Stadium |
| Kettering Town | Rockingham Road |
| Kingstonian | Kingsmeadow (groundshare with AFC Wimbledon) |
| Maidenhead United | York Road |
| Northwood | Chestnut Avenue |
| St Albans City | Clarence Park |
| Sutton United | Gander Green Lane |
| Thurrock | Ship Lane |

== Play-offs ==
Semi-finals
15°PD | Bedford Town | 3
20°PD | Hitchin Town | 1
16°PD | Heybridge Swifts | 3
19°PD | St Albans City | 4

Final
15°PD | Bedford Town | 4
19°PD | St Albans City | 5

Quarter-finals
1°Div1N | Yeading | 0
1°Div1S | Lewes | 1

Semi-finals
17°PD | Harrow Borough | 0(2)
18°PD | Kingstonian | 0(4)
14°PD | Basingstoke Town | 1
1°Div1S | Lewes | 4

Final
1°Div1S | Lewes | 1
18°PD | Kingstonian | 0

| Final |
| 7°Div1S | Dulwich Hamlet | 2(4) |
| 7°Div1N | Wealdstone | 2(5) |

== Division One North ==
Isthmian League Division One North
- Season: 2003–04
- Champions: Yeading
- Relegated: Enfield
- Matches: 552
- Goals: 1,745 (3.16 per match)
- Top goalscorer: 33 goals – DJ Campbell (Yeading)
- Highest attendance: 408 – Wealdstone – Hemel Hempstead Town, (24 April)
- Total attendance: 69,362
- Average attendance: 126 (-11.9% to previous season)

Division One North consisted of 24 clubs, including 18 clubs from the previous season, and six new clubs:

- Boreham Wood, relegated from the Premier Division
- Chesham United, relegated from the Premier Division
- Cheshunt, promoted as champions of Division Two
- Dunstable Town, promoted as champions of the Spartan South Midlands League
- Enfield, relegated from the Premier Division
- Leyton, promoted as runners-up in Division Two

Before the start of the season Leyton Pennant was renamed Waltham Forest.

Yeading won the division, but lost in the play-offs for a place in the newly created Conference North and South and were placed in the Premier Division along with Leyton and Cheshunt. Chesham United, Dunstable Town and Hemel Hempstead Town were transferred to the Southern Football League Premier Division. They were followed by Wealdstone, who defeated Dulwich Hamlet from Division One South. Enfield finished bottom of the table and relegated to Division Two, going down from sixth to ninth tier in two years due to league system reform.

At the end of the season divisions One were merged, all the remaining Division One North clubs were transferred to the Southern Football League Division Ones.

=== League table ===
| Pos | Team | Pld | W | D | L | GF | GA | GD | Pts | Promotion or relegation |
|---|---|---|---|---|---|---|---|---|---|---|
| 1 | Yeading | 46 | 32 | 7 | 7 | 112 | 54 | +58 | 103 | Qualified for the play-offs, then promoted to the Premier Division |
| 2 | Leyton | 46 | 29 | 9 | 8 | 90 | 53 | +37 | 96 | Promoted to the Premier Division |
| 3 | Cheshunt | 46 | 27 | 10 | 9 | 119 | 54 | +65 | 91 | Promoted to the Premier Division |
| 4 | Chesham United | 46 | 24 | 9 | 13 | 104 | 60 | +44 | 81 | Promoted to the Southern League Premier Division |
| 5 | Dunstable Town | 46 | 23 | 9 | 14 | 86 | 61 | +25 | 78 | Promoted to the Southern League Premier Division |
| 6 | Hemel Hempstead Town | 46 | 22 | 12 | 12 | 75 | 72 | +3 | 78 | Promoted to the Southern League Premier Division |
| 7 | Wealdstone | 46 | 23 | 7 | 16 | 81 | 51 | +30 | 76 | Qualified for the play-offs, then promoted to the Premier Division |
| 8 | Arlesey Town | 46 | 23 | 7 | 16 | 95 | 70 | +25 | 76 | Transferred to the Southern League Eastern Division |
| 9 | Boreham Wood | 46 | 20 | 13 | 13 | 82 | 59 | +23 | 73 | Transferred to the Southern League Eastern Division |
| 10 | Harlow Town | 46 | 20 | 10 | 16 | 75 | 51 | +24 | 70 | Transferred to the Southern League Eastern Division |
| 11 | Wingate & Finchley | 46 | 19 | 13 | 14 | 68 | 63 | +5 | 70 | Transferred to the Southern League Eastern Division |
| 12 | East Thurrock United | 46 | 19 | 11 | 16 | 62 | 54 | +8 | 68 | Transferred to the Southern League Eastern Division |
| 13 | Uxbridge | 46 | 15 | 14 | 17 | 59 | 57 | +2 | 59 | Transferred to the Southern League Eastern Division |
| 14 | Aveley | 46 | 15 | 14 | 17 | 67 | 71 | −4 | 59 | Transferred to the Southern League Eastern Division |
| 15 | Thame United | 46 | 16 | 9 | 21 | 72 | 83 | −11 | 57 | Transferred to the Southern League Western Division |
| 16 | Waltham Forest | 46 | 15 | 13 | 18 | 62 | 60 | +2 | 55 (Note: Waltham Forest deducted three points.) | Transferred to the Southern League Eastern Division |
| 17 | Wivenhoe Town | 46 | 15 | 10 | 21 | 79 | 104 | −25 | 55 | Transferred to the Southern League Eastern Division |
| 18 | Barton Rovers | 46 | 16 | 6 | 24 | 52 | 80 | −28 | 54 | Transferred to the Southern League Eastern Division |
| 19 | Oxford City | 46 | 14 | 11 | 21 | 55 | 65 | −10 | 53 | Transferred to the Southern League Western Division |
| 20 | Berkhamsted Town | 46 | 12 | 10 | 24 | 66 | 88 | −22 | 46 | Transferred to the Southern League Eastern Division |
| 21 | Great Wakering Rovers | 46 | 10 | 13 | 23 | 47 | 97 | −50 | 43 | Transferred to the Southern League Eastern Division |
| 22 | Tilbury | 46 | 10 | 9 | 27 | 56 | 100 | −44 | 39 | Transferred to the Southern League Eastern Division |
| 23 | Barking & East Ham United | 46 | 8 | 7 | 31 | 37 | 100 | −63 | 31 | Transferred to the Southern League Eastern Division |
| 24 | Enfield | 46 | 5 | 7 | 34 | 44 | 138 | −94 | 22 | Relegated to Division Two |

Rules for classification: 1) points; 2) goal difference; 3) number of goals scored.

=== Stadia and locations ===
Locations of the Division One North clubs
Greater London Division One North football clubs

| Club | Stadium |
|---|---|
| Arlesey Town | Hitchin Road |
| Aveley | The Mill Field |
| Barking & East Ham United | Mayesbrook Park |
| Barton Rovers | Sharpenhoe Road |
| Berkhamsted Town | Broadwater |
| Boreham Wood | Meadow Park |
| Chesham United | The Meadow |
| Cheshunt | Cheshunt Stadium |
| Dunstable Town | Creasey Park |
| East Thurrock United | Rookery Hill |
| Enfield | Meadow Park (groundshare with Boreham Wood) |
| Great Wakering Rovers | Burroughs Park |
| Harlow Town | Harlow Sportcentre |
| Hemel Hempstead Town | Vauxhall Road |
| Leyton | Leyton Stadium |
| Oxford City | Marsh Lane |
| Thame United | Windmill Road |
| Tilbury | Chadfields |
| Uxbridge | Honeycroft |
| Waltham Forest | Wadham Lodge |
| Wealdstone | White Lion (groundshare with Edgware Town) |
| Wingate & Finchley | The Harry Abrahams Stadium |
| Wivenhoe Town | Broad Lane |
| Yeading | The Warren |

== Division One South ==
Isthmian League Division One South
- Season: 2003–04
- Champions: Lewes
- Promoted: Lewes
- Relegated: Epsom & Ewell
- Matches: 552
- Goals: 1,709 (3.1 per match)
- Top goalscorer: 34 goals – Ian Hodges (Slough Town)
- Highest attendance: 932 – Lewes – Worthing, (12 April)
- Total attendance: 102,861
- Average attendance: 186 (+0.0% to previous season)

Division One South consisted of 24 clubs, including 21 clubs from the previous season, and three new clubs:

- Hampton & Richmond Borough, relegated from the Premier Division
- Marlow, transferred from Division One North
- Slough Town, transferred from Division One North

Lewes won the division and subsequent play-offs and were promoted to the Conference South. Clubs finished second to sixth were transferred to the Premier Division. Epsom & Ewell finished bottom of the table and were relegated, remaining clubs were to start next season in the merged Isthmian League Division One, going down with it from seventh to ninth level due to creation of Conference North/South.

=== League table ===
| Pos | Team | Pld | W | D | L | GF | GA | GD | Pts | Promotion or relegation |
|---|---|---|---|---|---|---|---|---|---|---|
| 1 | Lewes | 46 | 29 | 7 | 10 | 113 | 61 | +52 | 94 | Qualified for the play-offs, then promoted to the Conference South |
| 2 | Worthing | 46 | 26 | 14 | 6 | 87 | 46 | +41 | 92 | Promoted to the Premier Division |
| 3 | Windsor & Eton | 46 | 26 | 13 | 7 | 75 | 39 | +36 | 91 | Promoted to the Premier Division |
| 4 | Slough Town | 46 | 28 | 6 | 12 | 103 | 63 | +40 | 90 | Promoted to the Premier Division |
| 5 | Hampton & Richmond | 46 | 26 | 11 | 9 | 82 | 45 | +37 | 89 | Promoted to the Premier Division |
| 6 | Staines Town | 46 | 26 | 9 | 11 | 85 | 52 | +33 | 87 | Promoted to the Premier Division |
| 7 | Dulwich Hamlet | 46 | 23 | 15 | 8 | 77 | 57 | +20 | 84 | Qualified for the play-offs |
| 8 | Bromley | 46 | 22 | 10 | 14 | 80 | 58 | +22 | 76 | |
| 9 | Walton & Hersham | 46 | 20 | 14 | 12 | 76 | 55 | +21 | 74 | |
| 10 | Croydon Athletic | 46 | 20 | 10 | 16 | 70 | 54 | +16 | 70 | |
| 11 | Tooting & Mitcham United | 46 | 20 | 9 | 17 | 82 | 68 | +14 | 69 | |
| 12 | Ashford Town (Middlesex) | 46 | 18 | 13 | 15 | 69 | 62 | +7 | 67 | Transferred to the Southern League Western Division |
| 13 | Leatherhead | 46 | 19 | 9 | 18 | 83 | 88 | −5 | 66 | |
| 14 | Bracknell Town | 46 | 19 | 6 | 21 | 81 | 87 | −6 | 63 | Transferred to the Southern League Western Division |
| 15 | Horsham | 46 | 16 | 11 | 19 | 71 | 69 | +2 | 59 | |
| 16 | Marlow | 46 | 16 | 11 | 19 | 50 | 64 | −14 | 59 | Transferred to the Southern League Western Division |
| 17 | Whyteleafe | 46 | 17 | 4 | 25 | 66 | 93 | −27 | 55 | |
| 18 | Banstead Athletic | 46 | 15 | 8 | 23 | 56 | 73 | −17 | 53 | |
| 19 | Molesey | 46 | 12 | 6 | 28 | 45 | 84 | −39 | 42 | |
| 20 | Metropolitan Police | 46 | 9 | 14 | 23 | 58 | 84 | −26 | 41 | |
| 21 | Croydon | 46 | 10 | 10 | 26 | 57 | 88 | −31 | 40 | |
| 22 | Egham Town | 46 | 8 | 8 | 30 | 55 | 92 | −37 | 32 | Transferred to the Southern League Western Division |
| 23 | Corinthian-Casuals | 46 | 6 | 6 | 34 | 48 | 110 | −62 | 24 | |
| 24 | Epsom & Ewell | 46 | 5 | 8 | 33 | 40 | 117 | −77 | 23 | Relegated to Division Two |

Rules for classification: 1) points; 2) goal difference; 3) number of goals scored.

=== Stadia and locations ===
Locations of Division One South clubs
Greater London Division One South clubs

| Club | Stadium |
|---|---|
| Ashford Town (Middlesex) | Short Lane |
| Banstead Athletic | Merland Rise |
| Bracknell Town | Larges Lane |
| Bromley | Hayes Lane |
| Corinthian-Casuals | King George's Field |
| Croydon | Croydon Sports Arena |
| Croydon Athletic | Keith Tuckey Stadium |
| Dulwich Hamlet | Champion Hill |
| Egham Town | The Runnymede Stadium |
| Epsom & Ewell | Merland Rise (groundshare with Banstead Athletic) |
| Hampton & Richmond Borough | Beveree Stadium |
| Horsham | Queen Street |
| Leatherhead | Fetcham Grove |
| Lewes | The Dripping Pan |
| Marlow | Alfred Davis Memorial Ground |
| Metropolitan Police | Imber Court |
| Molesey | Walton Road Stadium |
| Slough Town | Stag Meadow (groundshare with Windsor & Eton) |
| Staines Town | Wheatsheaf Park |
| Tooting & Mitcham United | Imperial Fields |
| Walton & Hersham | The Sports Ground |
| Whyteleafe | Church Road |
| Windsor & Eton | Stag Meadow |
| Worthing | Woodside Road |

== Division Two ==
Isthmian League Division Two
- Season: 2003–04
- Champions: Leighton Town
- Matches: 315
- Goals: 1,021 (3.24 per match)
- Top goalscorer: 29 goals – John Frendo (Ware) and Matt Rawdon (Leighton Town)
- Highest attendance: 394 – Dorking – Hertford Town, (12 April)
- Total attendance: 23,880
- Average attendance: 76 (+1.3% to previous season)

After Hungerford Town resigned from the league, Division Two consisted of 15 clubs, including 12 clubs from the previous season, and three new clubs:

- Chertsey Town, relegated from Division One South
- Hertford Town, relegated from Division One North
- Wembley, relegated from Division One North

Leighton Town won the division and were transferred to Southern Football League Division One, while runners-up Dorking were transferred to the merged Isthmian League Division One. At the end of the season Wokingham Town merged into Emmbrook Sports (9° Reading League Premier Division) to create new club Wokingham & Emmbrook F.C., who joined Hellenic League Division One East.

=== League table ===
| Pos | Team | Pld | W | D | L | GF | GA | GD | Pts | Promotion or relegation |
|---|---|---|---|---|---|---|---|---|---|---|
| 1 | Leighton Town | 42 | 28 | 7 | 7 | 111 | 36 | +75 | 91 | Promoted to the Southern League Eastern Division |
| 2 | Dorking | 42 | 27 | 8 | 7 | 87 | 47 | +40 | 89 | Promoted to Division One |
| 3 | Hertford Town | 42 | 24 | 9 | 9 | 74 | 35 | +39 | 81 | |
| 4 | Chertsey Town | 42 | 22 | 9 | 11 | 75 | 53 | +22 | 75 | |
| 5 | Flackwell Heath | 42 | 22 | 5 | 15 | 71 | 53 | +18 | 71 | |
| 6 | Witham Town | 42 | 20 | 10 | 12 | 75 | 54 | +21 | 70 | |
| 7 | Kingsbury Town | 42 | 14 | 11 | 17 | 60 | 64 | −4 | 53 | |
| 8 | Ware | 42 | 14 | 10 | 18 | 67 | 60 | +7 | 52 | |
| 9 | Abingdon Town | 42 | 15 | 6 | 21 | 83 | 81 | +2 | 51 | |
| 10 | Camberley Town | 42 | 15 | 6 | 21 | 51 | 71 | −20 | 51 | |
| 11 | Wembley | 42 | 13 | 9 | 20 | 46 | 67 | −21 | 48 | |
| 12 | Wokingham Town | 42 | 12 | 7 | 23 | 55 | 94 | −39 | 43 | Merged into Emmbrook Sports to form Wokingham & Emmbrook F.C. in Hellenic League Division One East |
| 13 | Edgware Town | 42 | 12 | 6 | 24 | 62 | 88 | −26 | 42 | |
| 14 | Chalfont St Peter | 42 | 12 | 6 | 24 | 57 | 89 | −32 | 42 | |
| 15 | Clapton | 42 | 8 | 5 | 29 | 47 | 129 | −82 | 29 | |

Rules for classification: 1) points; 2) goal difference; 3) number of goals scored.

=== Stadia and locations ===
Locations of Division Two clubs
Greater London Division Two clubs

| Club | Stadium |
|---|---|
| Abingdon Town | Culham Road |
| Camberley Town | Krooner Park |
| Chalfont St Peter | Mill Meadow |
| Chertsey Town | Alwyns Lane |
| Clapton | The Old Spotted Dog Ground |
| Dorking | Meadowbank Stadium |
| Edgware Town | White Lion |
| Flackwell Heath | Wilks Park |
| Hertford Town | Hertingfordbury Park |
| Kingsbury Town | Avenue Park |
| Leighton Town | Bell Close |
| Ware | Wodson Park |
| Wembley | Vale Farm |
| Witham Town | Spa Road |
| Wokingham Town | Cantley Park |

== See also ==
- Isthmian League
- 2003–04 Northern Premier League
- 2003–04 Southern Football League
