= 1998–99 Arsenal F.C. season =

English football club season

Arsenal F.C.
1998–99 season
- Chairman: Peter Hill-Wood
- Manager: Arsène Wenger
- Stadium: Highbury (home domestic matches); Wembley Stadium (home UEFA Champions League matches)
- FA Premier League: 2nd
- FA Cup: Semi-final
- League Cup: Fourth round
- FA Charity Shield: Winners
- UEFA Champions League: Group stage
- Top goalscorer: League: Nicolas Anelka (17); All: Nicolas Anelka (19)
- Highest home attendance: 73,707 vs Lens (25 November 1998)
- Lowest home attendance: 37,161 vs Sheffield United (23 February 1999)
- Average home league attendance: 38,022
Home colours	Away colours	European Away colours

The 1998–99 season was Arsenal Football Club's seventh season in the FA Premier League and their 73rd consecutive season in the top flight of English football. The club, managed by Arsène Wenger, entered the campaign as Premier League and FA Cup double winners. They ended this campaign as league runners-up, a point behind Manchester United, who secured the title on the final day of the season. United also eliminated Arsenal in a FA Cup semi-final replay; Ryan Giggs scored an extra time winner in the 109th minute. Arsenal competed in Europe's premier club competition – the UEFA Champions League – for the first time since its rebrand in 1992, but failed to progress past the group stage.

In the transfer window, Arsenal purchased several players, including Swedish midfielder Freddie Ljungberg and Argentine Nelson Vivas. Ian Wright – the club's all-time top goalscorer, left in the summer to play for West Ham United. Striker Nwankwo Kanu joined Arsenal in January 1999.

Arsenal made an indifferent start to their league campaign with four consecutive draws from their first five matches. After defeat to Aston Villa in December 1998, the team embarked on a 19 match unbeaten run to steadily climb up the league table. A 6–1 win against Middlesbrough in April 1999 moved Arsenal to the top of the table for the first time in the season and victory against Tottenham Hotspur put the team three points clear as main challenger United drew with Liverpool. Both Arsenal and Manchester United went into the final two games of the league season on the same number of points, but the former's defeat to Leeds United all but ended their chances of retaining the title.

30 different players represented Arsenal in five competitions and there were 14 different goalscorers. Arsenal's top goalscorer was Nicolas Anelka, who scored 19 goals in 45 appearances.

== Background ==
In the 1997–98 season, Arsenal participated in the FA Premier League. The club made several new purchases, notably midfielders Emmanuel Petit and Marc Overmars from Monaco and Ajax respectively. Ian Wright scored his 179th and 180th goals for Arsenal against Bolton Wanderers in September 1997 and in the process broke Cliff Bastin's goalscoring record at the club. A run of three defeats in four matches, starting away at Derby County in November, concluded with a 3–1 loss at home to Blackburn Rovers and left the team in sixth place. Although they were 12 points behind league leaders Manchester United by the end of February, a winning streak of nine matches ensured Arsenal won the championship, with a 4–0 win over Everton in May 1998. At Wembley Stadium, Arsenal beat Newcastle United 2–0 in the 1998 FA Cup Final to win the competition and complete a domestic double.

Manager Arsène Wenger was awarded the Premier League Manager of the Season award and striker Dennis Bergkamp was given the accolade of PFA Players' Player of the Year by his fellow peers and FWA Footballer of the Year by football writers, in recognition of Arsenal's achievements.

=== Transfers ===
David Platt retired from career football at the end of the 1997–98 season. Wright left the club to join West Ham United on a two-year contract in July 1998. Wenger intended to replace him with either striker Patrick Kluivert or winger Thierry Henry, but wages and interest from other clubs proved to be a stumbling block. Defender Nelson Vivas was purchased on a £1.6 million deal to provide cover for Lee Dixon and Nigel Winterburn. Swedish midfielder Freddie Ljungberg joined the club on an undisclosed fee in September 1998, after reported interest from Chelsea. Wenger made the decision to sign him after his performance for the Sweden men's national football team against England; "I have been aware of Ljungberg for some time but after watching him against England I decided to move for him very quickly." In January 1999, Arsenal completed the signing of striker Nwankwo Kanu.

==== In ====
No.	Position	Player	Transferred from	Fee	Date	Ref
22	MF	David Grondin	Saint-Étienne	£500,000	19 June 1998	
7	DF	Nelson Vivas	Lugano	£1,600,000	5 August 1998	
8	MF	Freddie Ljungberg	Halmstad	Undisclosed	11 September 1998	
26	FW	Fabián Caballero	Cerro Porteño	Loan	29 October 1998	
	MF	Jermaine Pennant	Notts County	£2,000,000	8 January 1999	
25	FW	Nwankwo Kanu	Internazionale	Undisclosed	15 January 1999	
27	FW	Kaba Diawara	Bordeaux	Undisclosed	29 January 1999	

==== Out ====
No.	Position	Player	Transferred to	Fee	Date	Ref
	GK	Vince Bartram	Gillingham	Free	20 March 1998	
7	MF	David Platt	Retired			
	FW	Chris Kiwomya	Released			
	DF	Gavin McGowan	Luton Town	Free	26 June 1998	
	MF	Richard Hughes	Bournemouth	£20,000	1 July 1998	
8	FW	Ian Wright	West Ham United	£750,000	13 July 1998	
25	DF	Scott Marshall	Southampton	Free	14 July 1998	
32	FW	Isaiah Rankin	Bradford City	£1,300,000	13 August 1998	

== Pre-season and friendlies ==
To prepare for the upcoming season, Arsenal played a series of friendlies against, firstly, local sides Boreham Wood, Enfield Town and Luton Town, before travelling to Germany for their final pre-season games.

10 July 1998 Friendly	Boreham Wood	2–5	Arsenal	Borehamwood
	Hollingdale (?); Daly (?)	Report	(?) Hughes (?) Wreh (?) Garde (?) Anelka (?) Rankin	Stadium: Meadow Park; Attendance: 2,832

18 July 1998 Friendly	Enfield	0–0	Arsenal	London
				Attendance: 5,495

25 July 1998 Friendly	Luton Town	1–1	Arsenal	Luton
	(?) Bactuet	Report	Anelka (?)	Stadium: Kenilworth Road; Attendance: 5,118

31 July 1998 Friendly	Sportfreunde Eisbachtal	0–4	Arsenal	Nentershausen
			(?) Boa Morte (?) Rankin	Stadium: Eisbachtalstadion; Attendance: 2,300

4 August 1998 Friendly	Kickers Offenbach	0–4	Arsenal	Offenbach am Main
		Report	22' Parlour; 27', 60' Anelka; 74' Vernazza	Stadium: Stadion am Bieberer Berg; Attendance: 7,800

=== South Asian Tour ===
After the end of the season, Arsenal travelled to Asia to play the national sides of both Malaysia and Thailand. After a win against Malaysia, Arsenal suffered a shock loss to the Thai National Football team on 22 May.

19 May 1999 Friendly	Malaysia	0–2	Arsenal	Kuala Lumpur
		Report	54' Anelka; 66' Petit	Stadium: Bukit Jalil National Stadium; Attendance: 60,000

22 May 1999 Friendly	Thailand	4–3	Arsenal	Bangkok
	Kiatisuk 5', 87'; Thongchai 15'; Seksan (?)	Report	(?) Petit; 49', 58' Kanu	Stadium: Rajamangala Stadium; Attendance: 65,000

== FA Charity Shield ==
Arsenal started the season with a 3–0 win in the Charity Shield against last season's Premier League runners-up Manchester United. Goals came from Overmars in the first half, Christopher Wreh after 61 minutes and Nicolas Anelka 11 minutes after. The result was the first time that a club from Southern England had won the Shield outright since Tottenham Hotspur in 1962.

9 August 1998 Final	Arsenal	3–0	Manchester United	Wembley Stadium, London
13:00 BST	Overmars 34'; Wreh 61'; Anelka 72'			Attendance: 67,342; Referee: Graham Poll (Cheshire)

== FA Premier League ==
=== August–October ===
Arsenal began their defence of the league title against newly promoted team Nottingham Forest on 17 August 1998. A goal by Overmars, eleven minutes from the end gave Arsenal the lead; Geoff Thomas equalised for Nottingham Forest after Petit headed in the opening goal. A goalless draw against Liverpool was followed by successive 0–0 draws, at home to Charlton Athletic and away to Chelsea. Stephen Hughes scored a last minute equaliser at Filbert Street on 12 September 1998 to deny Leicester City a win. After the match, Wenger admitted the club were looking for a new striker to replace Ian Wright, being impressed with Leicester City's goalscorer Emile Heskey: "We will still be buying a striker but unfortunately Leicester do not want to sell Heskey so we will have to go somewhere else ... I'm impressed by Heskey. Today he did very well offensively and tried like crazy; too much for me." In Arsenal's next match, at home to Manchester United, goals from Tony Adams, Anelka and Freddie Ljungberg helped the champions inflict a 3–0 defeat; the result was Wenger's third consecutive win over rival manager Alex Ferguson. However, in the following match, Arsenal lost for the first time in the season, against Sheffield Wednesday. Substitute Lee Briscoe scored in the 89th minute, lobbing the ball precisely over goalkeeper Alex Manninger after Sheffield Wednesday striker Paolo Di Canio was sent off for pushing the referee.

On 4 October 1998, Arsenal hosted Newcastle United at Highbury; Dennis Bergkamp scored his first league goal of the season in a 3–0 win. The team failed to convert several chances against Southampton, with the match ending in a 1–1 draw; Anelka and Petit did however score against Blackburn Rovers the following game, thus putting pressure on opposing manager Roy Hodgson as Blackburn remained in the bottom four. The month ended with a 1–0 win away to Coventry City; Anelka scored his fifth league goal of the season, tapping the ball in the net after a counterattack started by Overmars.

=== November–February ===
"Perhaps we gave our fans too much by winning the Double. Once you've eaten caviar, it is difficult to go back to sausages."

— Arsène Wenger, 29 November 1998

Another 1–0 win, this time at home to Everton was followed by a goalless draw against rivals Tottenham Hotspur. After defeat midweek in the Champions League, Arsenal played Wimbledon at Selhurst Park. Striker Efan Ekoku scored the winning goal to condemn Arsenal to a second successive loss; Patrick Vieira sustained a hamstring injury in the match. Two more draws, against Middlesbrough and Derby County left Arsenal in fourth position but Wenger took comfort in the latter match, praising Steve Bould and David Seaman: "the real symbols of spirit". They faced league leaders Aston Villa on 13 December 1998, and having taken a 2–0 lead, through two goals scored by Bergkamp, had in unprecedented circumstances conceded three goals in the second half to lose the match. Arsenal responded to their third defeat of the season by putting a run together of three consecutive wins during the Christmas period – starting against Leeds United, followed by West Ham United and finally Charlton Athletic. The team ended the calendar year in fourth position, two points behind Chelsea.

On 9 January 1999, Arsenal were held to a stalemate by Liverpool; Wenger, commenting on the performance was disappointed about Liverpool's approach, adding: "Usually we create chances and don't score, but today we just didn't create chances." A headed goal by Martin Keown, from a Petit corner earned Arsenal a 1–0 win the following week, away to Nottingham Forest. Against Chelsea on the final day of January, Arsenal won 1–0 at Highbury to end the visitors 21-game unbeaten run in the Premier League. Wenger hailed the performance, saying "I knew my players were ready. After a few years you just know. It's like working for the weather forecast: you have a feeling whether it will rain or not."

An inspired performance by Bergkamp helped Arsenal win 0–4 at West Ham United in the first weekend of February. He, however missed the following match, away to Manchester United, due to suspension along with Petit; Keown was absent due to a hamstring injury. Arsenal conceded a first half penalty when Ray Parlour brought down Ronny Johnsen. Dwight Yorke missed, chipping the ball wide of the right-hand post, and was made to pay early in the second half as new signing Nwankwo Kanu's through ball found striker Anelka, who scored. Andy Cole equalised moments after – Arsenal's first goal conceded in two months, and with both teams spurring chances to win the match, it ended in a 1–1 draw. Three days after, Anelka scored his first career hat-trick against Leicester City. Bergkamp after the match felt Arsenal were now equipped to push on for a title challenge, like last season: "It's all coming back. I feel it, for myself and for the team." A draw at Newcastle left the team three points behind Chelsea, in third position.

=== March–May ===
Arsenal moved into second place with a 3–0 win over Sheffield Wednesday on 9 March 1999. A brace from Bergkamp and a debut goal scored by Kanu – dummying the goalkeeper inside the penalty box and shooting past the middle of the net - meant the club now picked up 27 points out of a possible last 33. A 2–0 win against Everton was followed by another 2–0 win, at home to Coventry City. Arsenal drew 0–0 with Southampton on 3 April 1999, which left the team four points behind league leaders Manchester United. A 1–0 victory against Blackburn Rovers three days later, helped them move a point behind first position. The team scored five goals against Wimbledon and hit Middlesbrough for six the following week; Kanu's first goal, Arsenal's third was described as an "illustration of the African's deceptive subtlety," side-stepping defender Dean Gordon before stroking the ball past the net. The result moved Arsenal to the top of the table for the first time in the season, albeit having played a match more than Manchester United.

In May Arsenal beat Derby County 1–0 to return to first spot, after Manchester United recorded three points against Aston Villa. A 3–1 away win against Tottenham Hotspur moved them three points clear after Paul Ince scored a late equaliser for Liverpool against Manchester United. Wenger was adamant that Ferguson's team were marginal favourites, but it was evident the title race would be decided on the final day, akin to 1995. Jimmy Floyd Hasselbaink's late winner for Leeds United against Arsenal two days later all but ended their chances of retaining the league championship. Although Manchester United drew their penultimate match away to Blackburn Rovers, they eventually secured the title with a 2–1 victory at home to Tottenham Hotspur; a second half goal scored by Kanu against Aston Villa on the final day ensured Arsenal finished a point behind, in second place.

=== Match results ===
17 August 1998 1	Arsenal	2–1	Nottingham Forest	London
20:00 BST	Petit 58'; Overmars 79'	Report	76' Thomas	Stadium: Highbury; Attendance: 38,064; Referee: Mike Riley

22 August 1998 2	Liverpool	0–0	Arsenal	Liverpool
15:00 BST		Report		Stadium: Anfield; Attendance: 44,429; Referee: David Elleray

29 August 1998 3	Arsenal	0–0	Charlton Athletic	London
15:00 BST		Report		Stadium: Highbury; Attendance: 38,014; Referee: Graham Poll

9 September 1998 4	Chelsea	0–0	Arsenal	London
20:00 BST		Report		Stadium: Stamford Bridge; Attendance: 34,644; Referee: Stephen Lodge

12 September 1998 5	Leicester City	1–1	Arsenal	London
15:00 BST	Heskey 28'	Report	90' Hughes	Stadium: Filbert Street; Attendance: 21,628; Referee: Paul Durkin

20 September 1998 6	Arsenal	3–0	Manchester United	London
16:00 BST	Adams 22'; Anelka 29'; Ljungberg 72'	Report		Stadium: Highbury; Attendance: 38,142; Referee: Graham Barber

26 September 1998 7	Sheffield Wednesday	1–0	Arsenal	Sheffield
15:00 BST	Briscoe 89'	Report		Stadium: Hillsborough; Attendance: 27,949; Referee: Paul Alcock

4 October 1998 8	Arsenal	3–0	Newcastle United	London
15:00 BST	Bergkamp 21', 66' (pen.); Anelka 29'	Report		Stadium: Highbury; Attendance: 38,102; Referee: Mike Reed

17 October 1998 9	Arsenal	1–1	Southampton	London
15:00 BST	Anelka 34'	Report	67' Howells	Stadium: Highbury; Attendance: 38,027; Referee: Jeff Winter

25 October 1998 10	Blackburn Rovers	1–2	Arsenal	Blackburn
16:00 BST	Johnson 64'	Report	25' Anelka; 39' Petit	Stadium: Ewood Park; Attendance: 27,012; Referee: Dermot Gallagher

31 October 1998 11	Coventry City	0–1	Arsenal	Coventry
15:00 GMT		Report	25' Anelka	Stadium: Highfield Road; Attendance: 23,040; Referee: Uriah Rennie

8 November 1998 12	Arsenal	1–0	Everton	London
15:00 GMT	Anelka 6'	Report		Stadium: Highbury; Attendance: 38,088; Referee: Gary Willard

14 November 1998 13	Arsenal	0–0	Tottenham Hotpsur	London
15:00 GMT		Report		Stadium: Highbury; Attendance: 38,278; Referee: Alan Wilkie

21 November 1998 14	Wimbledon	1–0	Arsenal	London
15:00 GMT	Ekoku 77'	Report		Stadium: Selhurst Park; Attendance: 26,003; Referee: Mike Riley

29 November 1998 15	Arsenal	1–1	Middlesbrough	London
15:00 GMT	Anelka 89'	Report	6' Deane	Stadium: Highbury; Attendance: 38,075; Referee: Graham Barber

5 December 1998 16	Derby County	0–0	Arsenal	Derby
15:00 GMT		Report		Stadium: Pride Park; Attendance: 29,018; Referee: Mike Reed

13 December 1998 17	Aston Villa	3–2	Arsenal	Birmingham
15:00 GMT	Joachim 62'; Dublin 65', 83'	Report	14', 45' Bergkamp	Stadium: Villa Park; Attendance: 39,217; Referee: Stephen Lodge

20 December 1998 18	Arsenal	3–1	Leeds United	London
16:00 GMT	Bergkamp 28'; Vieira 53'; Petit 82'	Report	66' Hasselbaink	Stadium: Highbury; Attendance: 38,025; Referee: Peter Jones

26 December 1998 19	Arsenal	1–0	West Ham United	London
15:00 GMT	Overmars 7'	Report		Stadium: Highbury; Attendance: 38,098; Referee: Peter Jones

28 December 1998 20	Charlton Athletic	0–1	Arsenal	London
15:00 GMT		Report	53' (pen.) Overmars	Stadium: The Valley; Attendance: 20,043; Referee: Uriah Rennie

9 January 1999 21	Arsenal	0–0	Liverpool	London
15:00 GMT		Report		Stadium: Highbury; Attendance: 38,107; Referee: Graham Barber

16 January 1999 22	Nottingham Forest	0–1	Arsenal	Nottingham
15:00 GMT		Report	34' Keown	Stadium: City Ground; Attendance: 26,021; Referee: Paul Durkin

31 January 1999 23	Arsenal	1–0	Chelsea	London
16:00 GMT	Bergkamp 32'	Report		Stadium: Highbury; Attendance: 38,121; Referee: Graham Poll

6 February 1999 24	West Ham United	0–4	Arsenal	London
15:00 GMT		Report	35' Bergkamp; 45' Overmars; 83' Anelka; 87' Parlour	Stadium: Boleyn Ground; Attendance: 26,042; Referee: Jeff Winter

17 February 1999 25	Manchester United	1–1	Arsenal	Manchester
20:00 GMT	Cole 71'	Report	58' Anelka	Stadium: Old Trafford; Attendance: 55,171; Referee: Gary Willard

20 February 1999 26	Arsenal	5–0	Leicester City	London
15:00 GMT	Anelka 23', 27', 44'; Parlour 42', 48'	Report		Stadium: Highbury; Attendance: 38,069; Referee: Paul Durkin

28 February 1999 27	Newcastle United	1–1	Arsenal	Newcastle
16:00 GMT	Hamann 77'	Report	36' Anelka	Stadium: St. James' Park; Attendance: 36,708; Referee: Mike Reed

9 March 1999 28	Arsenal	3–0	Sheffield Wednesday	London
19:45 GMT	Bergkamp 83', 88'; Kanu 86'	Report		Stadium: Highbury; Attendance: 37,792; Referee: David Elleray

13 March 1999 29	Everton	0–2	Arsenal	Liverpool
15:00 GMT		Report	16' Parlour; 69' (pen.) Bergkamp	Stadium: Goodison Park; Attendance: 38,049; Referee: Uriah Rennie

20 March 1999 30	Arsenal	2–0	Coventry City	London
15:00 GMT	Parlour 16'; Overmars 80'	Report		Stadium: Highbury; Attendance: 38,073; Referee: Paul Alcock

3 April 1999 31	Southampton	0–0	Arsenal	Southampton
15:00 GMT		Report		Stadium: The Dell; Attendance: 15,255; Referee: Peter Jones

6 April 1999 32	Arsenal	1–0	Blackburn Rovers	London
19:45 BST	Bergkamp 42'	Report		Stadium: Highbury; Attendance: 37,762; Referee: Graham Poll

19 April 1999 33	Arsenal	5–1	Wimbledon	London
20:00 GMT	Parlour 34'; Vieira 49'; Thatcher 56' (o.g.); Bergkamp 57'; Kanu 59'	Report	70' Cort	Stadium: Highbury; Attendance: 37,992; Referee: Stephen Lodge

24 April 1999 34	Middlesbrough	1–6	Arsenal	Middlesbrough
15:00 BST	Armstrong 87'	Report	4' (pen.) Overmars; 38', 78' Anelka; 45', 60' Kanu; 58' Vieira	Stadium: Riverside Stadium; Attendance: 34,630; Referee: Stephen Lodge

2 May 1999 35	Arsenal	1–0	Derby County	London
16:00 BST	Anelka 14'	Report		Stadium: Highbury; Attendance: 37,323; Referee: Neale Barry

5 May 1999 36	Tottenham Hotspur	1–3	Arsenal	London
20:00 BST	Anderton 43'	Report	17' Petit; 33' Anelka; 85' Kanu	Stadium: White Hart Lane; Attendance: 36,019; Referee: Steve Dunn

11 May 1999 37	Leeds United	1–0	Arsenal	Leeds
20:00 BST	Hasselbaink 86'	Report		Stadium: Elland Road; Attendance: 40,124; Referee: Gary Willard

16 May 1999 38	Arsenal	1–0	Aston Villa	London
16:00 BST	Kanu 66'	Report		Stadium: Highbury; Attendance: 38,308; Referee: Dermot Gallagher

=== Classification ===
Pos	Team	Pld	W	D	L	GF	GA	GD	Pts	Qualification or relegation
1	Manchester United (C)	38	22	13	3	80	37	+43	79	Qualification for the Champions League first group stage
2	Arsenal	38	22	12	4	59	17	+42	78	Qualification for the Champions League first group stage
3	Chelsea	38	20	15	3	57	30	+27	75	Qualification for the Champions League third qualifying round
4	Leeds United	38	18	13	7	62	34	+28	67	Qualification for the UEFA Cup first round
5	West Ham United	38	16	9	13	46	53	−7	57	Qualification for the Intertoto Cup third round

Source: Premier League
Rules for classification: 1) points; 2) goal difference; 3) number of goals scored.
(C) Champions

Overall								Home						Away					
Pld	W	D	L	GF	GA	GD	Pts	W	D	L	GF	GA	GD	W	D	L	GF	GA	GD
38	22	12	4	59	17	+42	78	14	5	0	34	5	+29	8	7	4	25	12	+13

Round	1	2	3	4	5	6	7	8	9	10	11	12	13	14	15	16	17	18	19	20	21	22	23	24	25	26	27	28	29	30	31	32	33	34	35	36	37	38
Ground	H	A	H	A	A	H	A	H	A	A	A	A	H	A	H	A	A	H	H	A	H	A	H	A	A	H	A	H	A	H	A	H	H	A	H	A	A	H
Result	W	D	D	D	D	W	L	W	D	W	W	W	D	L	D	D	L	W	W	W	D	W	W	W	D	W	D	W	W	W	D	W	W	W	W	W	L	W
Position	2	4	5	5	8	9	3	5	3	3	2	3	3	4	4	6	6	5	3	3	4	4	3	3	3	3	2	2	2	2	2	2	2	1	1	1	2	2

A = Away; H = Home; W = Win; D = Draw; L = Loss

== FA Cup ==
As holders and participants of the top division, Arsenal entered the FA Cup in the third round, in which they were drawn to play Preston North End of the Second Division. Despite being 2–0 down in the first half, Arsenal came back to win the match 4–2 at Deepdale. In the fourth round, Arsenal played Wolverhampton Wanderers – a repeat of last year's semi-final. Goals from Overmars and Bergkamp helped Arsenal win 2–1; the match was overshadowed by the sending off of midfielder Petit. A fifth round tie against Sheffield United was replayed on 23 February 1999 at the suggestion of Wenger. The winning goal, scored by Overmars came from failure to return the ball to the opposition, in order to get defender Lee Morris off the pitch. Arsenal went on to win the replay 2–1 and a 1–0 victory against Derby County meant the team reached the semi-finals for the second consecutive season.

Arsenal played league challengers Manchester United on 11 April 1999. Neither team was able to score even after extra time had been played, therefore the match was decided in a replay four days later. David Beckham opened the scoring for United from a long range shot, but Bergkamp equalised with a shot that deflected off United's centre back Jaap Stam. United captain Roy Keane was red-carded for two bookable offences, with his team playing the last thirty minutes of normal time a man down. In injury time, Phil Neville fouled Parlour in the penalty area, conceding a penalty. Peter Schmeichel parried away Bergkamp's resultant spot kick and the game went into extra time. Giggs scored partway through the second half of extra time. Picking up possession on the halfway line after a loose pass from Patrick Vieira, he dribbled past the entire Arsenal back line before shooting just under Seaman's bar. Giggs ran celebrating towards the United fans, and the team held on win 2–1. The goal was the last ever scored in a FA Cup semi-final replay; it was to be abolished from the following season.

4 January 1999 Third round	Preston North End	2–4	Arsenal	Preston
19:45 GMT	Nogan 17', 21'		44' Boa Morte; 60', 79' Petit; 81' Overmars	Stadium: Deepdale; Attendance: 21,099

24 January 1999 Fourth round	Wolverhampton Wanderers	1–2	Arsenal	Wolverhampton
15:30 GMT	Flo 37'		10' Overmars; 69' Bergkamp	Stadium: Molineux Stadium; Attendance: 27,511; Referee: Steve Dunn (Bristol)

13 February 1999 Fifth round	Arsenal	2–1	Sheffield United	London
	Vieira 28'; Overmars 76'		48' Marcelo	Stadium: Highbury; Attendance: 38,020; Referee: Peter Jones (Loughborough)
Note: The fifth round tie against Sheffield United was replayed on 23 February 1999 at the suggestion of Arsene Wenger. After Arsenal's winning goal, scored by Marc Overmars came from the failure to return the ball to the opposition, in order to get defender Lee Morris off the pitch.The replay was accepted by the FA and Sheffield United.

23 February 1999 Fifth round replay	Arsenal	2–1	Sheffield United	London
19:45	Overmars 15'; Bergkamp 37'		86' Morris	Stadium: Highbury; Attendance: 37,161; Referee: Peter Jones (Loughborough)
Note: The fifth round tie against Sheffield United was replayed on 23 February 1999 at the suggestion of Arsene Wenger. After Arsenal's winning goal, scored by Marc Overmars came from the failure to return the ball to the opposition, in order to get defender Lee Morris off the pitch. The replay was accepted by the FA and Sheffield United.

6 March 1999 Sixth round	Arsenal	1–0	Derby County	London
15:00	Kanu 89'	Details		Stadium: Highbury; Attendance: 38,046; Referee: Steve Dunn (Gloucestershire)

11 April 1999 Semi-finals	Manchester United	0–0 (a.e.t.)	Arsenal	Birmingham
12:30				Stadium: Villa Park; Attendance: 39,217; Referee: David Elleray (Kent)

14 April 1999 Semi-finals replay	Arsenal	1–2 (a.e.t.)	Manchester United	Birmingham
19:45	Bergkamp 69'		Beckham 17'; Giggs 109'	Stadium: Villa Park; Attendance: 30,223; Referee: David Elleray (Kent)

== League Cup ==
In the third round of the League Cup, Arsenal faced Derby County at Pride Park. Wenger made several first team changes to give his younger players playing time; Arsenal ran out 2–1 winners, a performance where "every touch by a Derby player was greeted with ironic cheers." However, the team were beaten comprehensively in the next round to Chelsea at Highbury, losing 0–5. The result inflicted Arsenal's biggest defeat in over eight years and Wenger defended his team selection, virtually a 'second team': "I knew before the game that this kind of thing might happen. You only had to look at the team sheets. If we had won I would still have gone on playing the same side because the players need the experience." Bergkamp, who was rested for the match, echoed his manager's comments: "We had a lot of young players on the field against Chelsea and, although they were feeling very down after losing like that, they will learn from it. To be honest, the scoreline doesn't mean anything, whether it was 1–0 or 5–0. The supporters will feel bad but I hope they understand Saturday will be a different game [at home to Tottenham Hotspur]."

28 October 1998 Third round	Derby County	1–2	Arsenal	Derby
19:45 GMT	Sturridge 83'	Report	21' (o.g.) Carsley; 55' Vivas	Stadium: Pride Park Stadium; Attendance: 25,621; Referee: Stephen Lodge

11 November 1998 Fourth round	Arsenal	0–5	Chelsea	London
20:00 GMT		Report	34' (pen.) Leboeuf; 49', 73' Vialli; 65', 80' Poyet	Stadium: Highbury; Attendance: 37,562; Referee: David Elleray

== UEFA Champions League ==
=== Group stage ===
Winning the Premier League the previous season ensured Arsenal's qualification into the UEFA Champions League. They last participated in Europe's premier competition seven years ago, losing to Portuguese club Benfica, in the second round; the competition since was rebranded. In order to boost attendance figures, Arsenal was granted permission by UEFA and the Football Association to host their home Champions League matches at Wembley Stadium. A Wembley spokesman added "We would be delighted for Arsenal to use the stadium. It makes financial sense."

The club were drawn in Group E, along with French champions Lens, Ukraine's Dynamo Kyiv and Panathinaikos of Greece. In the opening match against Lens, Arsenal conceded a late equaliser having dominated possession and chances. A win against Panathinaikos was followed by a draw at home to Dynamo Kyiv; Serhii Rebrov scoring the equaliser in stoppage time. In the reverse fixture, Arsenal – depleted due to injuries, lost 3–1 and a further defeat, at home to Lens meant the team effectively were out of the competition. An understrength Arsenal team won their final group game away to Panathinaikos but finished third in Group B; Wenger asserted after the match that his main aim was to retain the Premier League, going further to describe the group as "very average".

Pos	Team	Pld	W	D	L	GF	GA	GD	Pts	Qualification
1	(Ukraine) Dynamo Kyiv	6	3	2	1	11	7	+4	11	Advance to knockout stage
2	(France) Lens	6	2	2	2	5	6	−1	8	
3	(England) Arsenal	6	2	2	2	8	8	0	8	
4	(Greece) Panathinaikos	6	2	0	4	6	9	−3	6	

Source: UEFA

16 September 1998 1	Lens	1–1	Arsenal	Lens, France
20:45 CEST	Vairelles 90'	Report	56' Overmars	Stadium: Stade Félix Bollaert; Attendance: 33,371; Referee: Hellmut Krug (Germany)

30 September 1998 2	Arsenal	2–1	Panathinaikos	London, England
19:45 BST	Adams 64'; Keown 72'	Report	88' Mauro	Stadium: Wembley Stadium; Attendance: 73,454; Referee: Antonio López Nieto (Spain)

21 October 1998 3	Arsenal	1–1	Dynamo Kyiv	London, England
19:45 GMT	Bergkamp 74'	Report	90' Rebrov	Stadium: Wembley Stadium; Attendance: 73,256; Referee: Ryszard Wójcik (Poland)

4 November 1998 4	Dynamo Kyiv	3–1	Arsenal	Kyiv, Ukraine
21:45 EST	Rebrov 27' (pen.); Holovko 62'; Shevchenko 72'	Report	83' Hughes	Stadium: Olimpiysky National Sports Complex; Attendance: 53,000; Referee: Piero Ceccarini (Italy)

25 November 1998 5	Arsenal	0–1	Lens	London, England
19:45 GMT		Report	72' Debève	Stadium: Wembley Stadium; Attendance: 73,707; Referee: Markus Merk (Germany)

9 December 1998 6	Panathinaikos	1–3	Arsenal	Athens, Greece
21:45 EST	Sypniewski 74'		65' (o.g.) Asanović; 80' Anelka; 86' Boa Morte	Stadium: Spiridon Louis; Attendance: 41,105; Referee: Stefano Braschi (Italy)

== Player statistics ==
Arsenal used a total of 30 players during the 1998–99 season and there were 14 different goalscorers. There were also three squad members who did not make a first-team appearance in the campaign. Overmars featured in 49 matches – the most of any Arsenal player in the campaign. Vivas made the most appearances as a substitute with 18.

The team scored a total of 82 goals in all competitions. The highest scorer was Anelka, with 19 goals, followed by Bergkamp who scored 16 goals. Three Arsenal players were sent off during the season: Dixon, Keown and Petit (twice).

Key

No. = Squad number

Pos = Playing position

Nat. = Nationality

Apps = Appearances

GK = Goalkeeper

DF = Defender

MF = Midfielder

FW = Forward

= Yellow cards

= Red cards

Numbers in parentheses denote appearances as substitute. Players with number struck through and marked † left the club during the playing season.

No.	Pos.	Nat.	Name	FA Premier League		FA Cup		League Cup		FA Charity Shield		UEFA Champions League		Total		Discipline	
No.	Pos.	Nat.	Name	Apps	Goals	Apps	Goals	Apps	Goals	Apps	Goals	Apps	Goals	Apps	Goals	A yellow rectangular card	A red rectangular card
1	GK	ENG	David Seaman	32	0	5	0	0	0	1	0	6	0	44	0	0	0
2	DF	ENG	Lee Dixon	36	0	5	0	0	0	1	0	5	0	48	0	7	1
3	DF	ENG	Nigel Winterburn	30	0	6	0	5	0	1	0	5	0	42	0	8	0
4	MF	FRA	Patrick Vieira	34	3	5 (1)	1	0	0	1	0	3	0	43	4	7	0
5	DF	ENG	Steve Bould	14 (5)	0	3 (1)	0	0	0	(1)	0	2 (1)	0	19 (8)	0	3	0
6	DF	ENG	Tony Adams	26	1	5	0	0	0	1	0	4	1	36	2	4	0
7	DF	ARG	Nelson Vivas	10 (13)	0	4 (2)	0	2	1	0	0	2 (3)	0	18 (18)	1	5	0
8	MF	SWE	Freddie Ljungberg	10 (6)	1	2 (1)	0	2	0	0	0	0	0	14 (7)	1	4	0
9	FW	FRA	Nicolas Anelka	34 (1)	17	5	0	0	0	1	1	5	1	44 (1)	19	0	0
10	FW	NED	Dennis Bergkamp	28 (1)	12	6	3	1	0	1	0	3	1	40 (1)	16	5	0
11	MF	NED	Marc Overmars	37	6	6 (1)	4	0	0	1	1	4	1	48 (1)	12	2	0
12	FW	LBR	Christopher Wreh	3 (9)	0	0	0	2	0	(1)	1	3	0	8 (10)	1	0	0
13	GK	AUT	Alex Manninger	6	0	2	0	2	0	0	0	0	0	10	0	0	0
14	DF	ENG	Martin Keown	34	1	4	0	0	0	1	0	5	1	44	2	7	1
15	MF	ENG	Ray Parlour	35	6	7	0	0	0	1	0	4	0	47	6	3	0
16	MF	ENG	Stephen Hughes	4 (10)	1	2 (2)	0	2	0	(1)	0	2 (2)	1	10 (15)	2	0	0
17	MF	FRA	Emmanuel Petit	26 (1)	4	3	2	0	0	1	0	3	0	33 (1)	6	8	2
18	DF	FRA	Gilles Grimandi	3 (5)	0	1 (1)	0	2	0	(1)	0	1 (1)	0	7 (8)	0	1	0
19	MF	FRA	Rémi Garde	6 (4)	0	2 (2)	0	2	0	0	0	3 (2)	0	13 (8)	0	2	0
20	DF	ENG	Matthew Upson	(5)	0	1	0	2	0	0	0	0	0	4 (5)	0	0	0
21	MF	POR	Luís Boa Morte	2 (6)	0	1	1	2	0	(1)	0	2 (1)	1	5 (7)	2	0	0
22	DF	FRA	David Grondin	1	0	0	0	2	0	0	0	1	0	4	0	0	0
23	MF	GER	Alberto Méndez	0	0	1	0	1 (1)	0	0	0	1	1	3 (1)	1	0	0
25	FW	NGR	Nwankwo Kanu	5 (7)	6	(5)	1	0	0	0	0	0	0	5 (12)	8	0	0
26	FW	ARG	Fabián Caballero	(1)	0	(1)	0	(1)	0	0	0	0	0	(3)	0	0	0
27	FW	FRA	Kaba Diawara	2 (10)	0	1 (2)	0	0	0	0	0	0	0	3 (12)	0	0	0
28	MF	ENG	Michael Black	0	0	0	0	0	0	0	0	(1)	0	(1)	0	0	0
29	DF	ENG	Jason Crowe	0	0	0	0	(1)	0	0	0	0	0	(1)	0	0	0
30	MF	ENG	Paolo Vernazza	0	0	0	0	0	0	0	0	1	0	1	0	0	0
32	FW	ENG	Omer Riza	0	0	0	0	(1)	0	0	0	0	0	(1)	0	0	0

== See also ==
- 1998–99 in English football
- List of Arsenal F.C. seasons
