= 2006–07 Isthmian League =

The 2006–07 season was the 92nd season of the Isthmian League, which is an English football competition featuring semi-professional and amateur clubs from London, East and South East England. Also, it was the first season for newly created divisions One North and One South.

== Premier Division ==
Isthmian League Premier Division
- Season: 2006–07
- Champions: Hampton & Richmond Borough
- Promoted: Bromley; Hampton & Richmond Borough
- Relegated: Slough Town; Walton & Hersham; Worthing
- Matches: 462
- Goals: 1,385 (3 per match)
- Top goalscorer: 37 goals – Danny Hockton (Margate)
- Highest attendance: 3,377 – AFC Wimbledon – Heybridge Swifts, (21 April)
- Total attendance: 227,011
- Average attendance: 491 (+5.4% to previous season)

The Premier Division consisted of 22 clubs, including 16 clubs from the previous season, and six new clubs.

- Three clubs promoted from Division One:
  - Horsham
  - Ramsgate
  - Tonbridge Angels
- Plus
  - Ashford Town (Middlesex), promoted as runners-up of Southern Football League Western Division
  - Boreham Wood, promoted as champions of Southern Football League Eastern Division
  - Carshalton Athletic, relegated from the Conference South

Hampton & Richmond Borough won the division and were promoted to the Conference South along with play-off winners Bromley. Worthing, Walton & Hersham and Slough Town were relegated, while Harrow Borough, initially also relegated as the worst 19th-placed club among seventh level leagues, were reprieved as an effect of the Conference clubs Farnborough Town and Scarborough folded, Lancaster City demoted two levels down and Hayes merged with Yeading.

=== League table ===
Pos	Team	Pld	W	D	L	GF	GA	GD	Pts	Promotion or relegation
1	Hampton & Richmond	42	24	10	8	77	53	+24	82	Promoted to the Conference South
2	Bromley	42	23	11	8	83	43	+40	80	Qualified for the play-offs, then promoted to the Conference South
3	Chelmsford City	42	23	8	11	96	51	+45	77	Qualified for the play-offs
4	Billericay Town	42	22	11	9	71	42	+29	77	Qualified for the play-offs
5	AFC Wimbledon	42	21	15	6	76	37	+39	75 (Note: AFC Wimbledon were deducted eighteen points for fielding a player without international clearance in eleven matches. After an appeal deduction was cut to three points.)	Qualified for the play-offs
6	Margate	42	20	11	11	79	48	+31	71	
7	Boreham Wood	42	19	12	11	71	49	+22	69	
8	Horsham	42	18	14	10	70	57	+13	68	
9	Ramsgate	42	20	5	17	63	63	0	65	
10	Heybridge Swifts	42	17	13	12	57	40	+17	64	
11	Tonbridge Angels	42	20	4	18	74	72	+2	64	
12	Staines Town	42	15	12	15	64	64	0	57	
13	Carshalton Athletic	42	14	12	16	54	59	−5	54	
14	Hendon	42	16	6	20	53	64	−11	54	
15	Leyton	42	13	10	19	55	77	−22	49	
16	East Thurrock United	42	14	6	22	56	70	−14	48	
17	Ashford Town (Middlesex)	42	11	13	18	59	71	−12	46	
18	Folkestone Invicta	42	12	10	20	45	66	−21	46	
19	Harrow Borough	42	13	6	23	61	71	−10	45	Reprieved from relegation
20	Worthing	42	8	11	23	57	82	−25	35	Relegated to Division One South
21	Walton & Hersham	42	9	6	27	38	83	−45	33	Relegated to Division One South
22	Slough Town	42	4	6	32	26	123	−97	18	Relegated to SFL Division One South & West

Rules for classification: 1) points; 2) goal difference; 3) number of goals scored.

==== Top scorers ====
Player	Club	Goals
Danny Hockton	Margate	37
John Main	Tonbridge Angels	36
Danny Gabriel	East Thurrock United / Enfield / Waltham Forest	22
Ian Hodges	Hampton & Richmond Borough	21
Mark Nwokeji	Staines Town	20
Nic McDonnell	Bromley	20
Ali Chaaban	Staines Town	19
Kezie Ibe	Chelmsford City	19
Richard Jolly	AFC Wimbledon	19

=== Play-offs ===
Semifinals
2	Bromley	1
5	AFC Wimbledon	0
3	Chelmsford City	1(3)
4	Billericay Town	1(5)

Final
2	Bromley	1(4)
4	Billericay Town	1(2)

=== Stadia and locations ===
Locations of the Premier Division clubs
Greater London Premier Division football clubs

Club	Stadium
AFC Wimbledon	Kingsmeadow (groundshare with Kingstonian)
Ashford Town (Middlesex)	Short Lane
Billericay Town	New Lodge
Boreham Wood	Meadow Park
Bromley	Hayes Lane
Carshalton Athletic	War Memorial Sports Ground
Chelmsford City	Melbourne Stadium
East Thurrock United	Rookery Hill
Folkestone Invicta	Cheriton Road
Hampton & Richmond Borough	Beveree Stadium
Harrow Borough	Earlsmead Stadium
Hendon	Claremont Road
Heybridge Swifts	Scraley Road
Horsham	Queen Street
Leyton	Leyton Stadium
Margate	Hartsdown Park
Ramsgate	Southwood Stadium
Slough Town	Stag Meadow (groundshare with Windsor & Eton)
Staines Town	Wheatsheaf Park
Tonbridge Angels	Longmead Stadium
Walton & Hersham	The Sports Ground
Worthing	Woodside Road

== Division One North ==
Isthmian League Division One North
- Season: 2006–07
- Champions: AFC Hornchurch
- Promoted: AFC Hornchurch; Harlow Town
- Relegated: Flackwell Heath
- Matches: 462
- Goals: 1,266 (2.74 per match)
- Top goalscorer: 24 goals – Harry Elmes (Waltham Abbey)
- Highest attendance: 751 – AFC Hornchurch – Canvey Island, (9 April)
- Total attendance: 72,722
- Average attendance: 157

After the end of the previous season, Division One was restructured. Most of the previous season's Division One clubs were transferred to Division One South.

Division One North consisted of 22 clubs: eleven clubs transferred from Southern League Division One North, three clubs relegated from higher-level leagues and eight clubs promoted from lower-level leagues. Barking & East Ham United, another club from the Southern League, joined the division but resigned and folded before the start of the season.

- Eleven clubs transferred from Southern Football League Eastern Division:
  - Arlesey Town
  - Aveley
  - Enfield
  - Enfield Town
  - Great Wakering Rovers
  - Harlow Town
  - Ilford
  - Potters Bar Town
  - Waltham Forest
  - Wingate & Finchley
  - Wivenhoe Town
- Two clubs relegated from the Premier Division:
  - Maldon Town
  - Redbridge
- Club demoted from the Conference National:
  - Canvey Island
- Three clubs promoted from Division Two:
  - Flackwell Heath
  - Ware
  - Witham Town
- Three clubs promoted from the Essex Senior League:
  - AFC Hornchurch
  - Tilbury
  - Waltham Abbey
- Two clubs promoted from the Eastern Counties League:
  - AFC Sudbury
  - Bury Town

Maldon Town qualified for the play-offs but were ineligible for promotion due to ground grading issues, so Harlow Town received a bye to the play-off final which they won, and were promoted to the Premier Division along with AFC Hornchurch, who earned a second successive promotion. Flackwell Heath finished bottom of the table and were relegated. At the end of the season Enfield folded with phoenix club Enfield 1893 joining Essex Senior League. Ilford finished second bottom, but were reprieved to make up the number of clubs at eight tier after a few higher league clubs folded and merged and Northern Premier League was reformed.

=== League table ===
Pos	Team	Pld	W	D	L	GF	GA	GD	Pts	Promotion or relegation
1	AFC Hornchurch	42	32	7	3	96	27	+69	103	Promoted to the Premier Division
2	Harlow Town	42	24	10	8	71	31	+40	82	Qualified for the play-offs, then promoted to the Premier Division
3	Enfield Town	42	24	7	11	74	39	+35	79	Qualified for the play-offs
4	Maldon Town	42	20	11	11	50	42	+8	71	Ineligible for promotion
5	AFC Sudbury	42	19	13	10	67	41	+26	70	Qualified for the play-offs
6	Canvey Island	42	19	10	13	65	47	+18	67	
7	Ware	42	19	10	13	70	56	+14	67	
8	Waltham Forest	42	17	14	11	60	56	+4	65	
9	Wingate & Finchley	42	16	11	15	58	49	+9	59	
10	Waltham Abbey	42	15	13	14	65	51	+14	58	
11	Wivenhoe Town	42	16	9	17	50	52	−2	57	
12	Great Wakering Rovers	42	16	9	17	57	64	−7	57	
13	Enfield	42	16	6	20	65	63	+2	54	Resigned and folded
14	Potters Bar Town	42	14	9	19	60	62	−2	51	
15	Aveley	42	14	9	19	47	57	−10	51	
16	Redbridge	42	15	5	22	42	48	−6	50	
17	Bury Town	42	13	11	18	57	69	−12	50	
18	Arlesey Town	42	13	11	18	44	63	−19	50	
19	Tilbury	42	11	10	21	43	72	−29	43	
20	Witham Town	42	10	7	25	52	90	−38	37	
21	Ilford	42	9	5	28	36	97	−61	32	Reprieved from relegation
22	Flackwell Heath	42	7	9	26	37	90	−53	30	Relegated to the Hellenic League

Rules for classification: 1) points; 2) goal difference; 3) number of goals scored.

==== Top scorers ====
Player	Club	Goals
Harry Elmes	Ware	24
Ricci Crace	Enfield Town	23
Simon Parker	AFC Hornchurch	23
Kris Lee	AFC Hornchurch	22

=== Play-offs ===
Semi-finals
2	Harlow Town
4	Bye
3	Enfield Town	2
5	AFC Sudbury	4

Final
2	Harlow Town	2(5)
5	AFC Sudbury	2(3)

=== Stadia and locations ===
Locations of Division One North clubs
Greater London Division One North clubs

Club	Stadium
AFC Hornchurch	Hornchurch Stadium
AFC Sudbury	King's Marsh
Arlesey Town	Hitchin Road
Aveley	The Mill Field
Bury Town	Ram Meadow
Canvey Island	Brockwell Stadium
Enfield	Wodson Park (groundshare with Ware)
Enfield Town	Goldsdown Road (groundshare with Brimsdown Rovers)
Flackwell Heath	Wilks Park
Great Wakering Rovers	Burroughs Park
Harlow Town	Barrows Farm
Ilford	Cricklefield Stadium
Maldon Town	Wallace Binder Ground
Potters Bar Town	Parkfield
Redbridge	Oakside
Tilbury	Chadfields
Waltham Abbey	Capershotts
Waltham Forest	Wadham Lodge
Ware	Wodson Park
Wingate & Finchley	The Harry Abrahams Stadium
Witham Town	Spa Road
Wivenhoe Town	Broad Lane

1.Harlow Town spent start of the season at their old stadium Sportscentre before moving to Barrows Farm at October.

== Division One South ==
Isthmian League Division One South
- Season: 2006–07
- Champions: Maidstone United
- Promoted: Hastings United; Maidstone United
- Relegated: None
- Matches: 462
- Goals: 1,381 (2.99 per match)
- Top goalscorer: 25 goals – Brendon Cass (Dartford)
- Highest attendance: 4,097 – Dartford – Horsham YMCA, (11 November)
- Total attendance: 122,629
- Average attendance: 287

After the end of the previous season, Division One was restructured. Most of the previous season's Division One clubs were transferred to Division One South.

Division One South consisted of 22 clubs, 16 clubs transferred from previous season Division One and six new clubs.

- Three clubs transferred from Southern Football League Eastern Division:
  - Chatham Town
  - Dartford
  - Sittingbourne
- Plus:
  - Godalming Town, promoted as champions of the Combined Counties League
  - Horsham YMCA, promoted as champions of the Sussex County League
  - Maidstone United, promoted as champions of the Kent League

Maidstone United won their second title in a row and were promoted to the Premier Division along with play-off winners Hastings United. Both clubs finished in the relegation zone were reprieved to make up the number of clubs at eight tier after a few higher league clubs folded and merged and Northern Premier League was reformed.

=== League table ===
Pos	Team	Pld	W	D	L	GF	GA	GD	Pts	Promotion or relegation
1	Maidstone United	42	23	11	8	79	47	+32	80	Promoted to the Premier Division
2	Tooting & Mitcham United	42	22	13	7	70	41	+29	79	Qualified for the play-offs
3	Dover Athletic	42	22	11	9	77	41	+36	77	Qualified for the play-offs
4	Hastings United	42	22	10	10	79	56	+23	76	Qualified for the play-offs, then promoted to the Premier Division
5	Fleet Town	42	21	12	9	65	52	+13	75	Qualified for the play-offs, then transferred to SFL Division One South & West
6	Metropolitan Police	42	18	15	9	65	48	+17	69	
7	Dartford	42	19	11	12	86	65	+21	68	Transferred to Division One North
8	Dulwich Hamlet	42	18	13	11	83	56	+27	67	
9	Horsham YMCA	42	17	7	18	59	69	−10	58	
10	Sittingbourne	42	14	15	13	68	63	+5	57	
11	Leatherhead	42	15	10	17	58	63	−5	55	
12	Cray Wanderers	42	14	12	16	67	69	−2	54	
13	Kingstonian	42	13	13	16	60	63	−3	52	
14	Burgess Hill Town	42	13	12	17	58	81	−23	51	
15	Molesey	42	12	13	17	52	63	−11	49	
16	Chatham Town	42	12	11	19	52	62	−10	47	
17	Walton Casuals	42	11	13	18	57	71	−14	46	
18	Ashford Town (Kent)	42	10	14	18	52	65	−13	44	
19	Croydon Athletic	42	12	8	22	44	77	−33	44	
20	Whyteleafe	42	9	15	18	52	65	−13	42	
21	Corinthian-Casuals	42	8	10	24	53	88	−35	34	Reprieved from relegation
22	Godalming Town	42	8	9	25	45	76	−31	33	Reprieved from relegation, then transferred to SFL Division One South & West

Rules for classification: 1) points; 2) goal difference; 3) number of goals scored.

==== Top scorers ====
Player	Club	Goals
Brendon Cass	Dartford	25
Paul Vines	Tooting & Mitcham United	23
Chris Dickson	Dulwich Hamlet	20
Bobby Traynor	Walton & Hersham / Kingstonian	19

=== Play-offs ===
Semifinals
2	Tooting & Mitcham United	2
5	Fleet Town	1
3	Dover Athletic	0
4	Hastings United	2

Final
2	Tooting & Mitcham United	0
4	Hastings United	2

=== Stadia and locations ===
Locations of Division One South clubs
Greater London Division One South clubs

Club	Stadium
Ashford Town (Kent)	The Homelands
Burgess Hill Town	Leylands Park
Chatham Town	The Sports Ground
Corinthian-Casuals	King George's Field
Cray Wanderers	Hayes Lane (groundshare with Bromley)
Croydon Athletic	Keith Tuckey Stadium
Dartford	Princes Park
Dover Athletic	Crabble Athletic Ground
Dulwich Hamlet	Champion Hill
Fleet Town	Calthorpe Park
Godalming Town	Weycourt
Hastings United	The Pilot Field
Horsham YMCA	Gorings Mead
Kingstonian	Kingsmeadow (groundshare with AFC Wimbledon)
Leatherhead	Fetcham Grove
Maidstone United	Bourne Park (groundshare with Sittingbourne)
Metropolitan Police	Imber Court
Molesey	Walton Road Stadium
Sittingbourne	Bourne Park
Tooting & Mitcham United	Imperial Fields
Walton Casuals	Waterside Stadium
Whyteleafe	Church Road

2.Dartford spent start of the season groundsharing with Ebbsfleet United before moving to Princes Park at November.

== League Cup ==
2006–07 Isthmian League Cup
Tournament details
- Country: England
- Teams: 66

Final positions
- Champions: Ashford Town (Middx)
- Runners-up: Dover Athletic

The Isthmian League Cup 2006–07 was the 33rd season of the Isthmian League Cup, the league cup competition of the Isthmian League. Sixty-six clubs took part. The competition commenced on 22 August and finished on 4 April.

=== Calendar ===
Round	Dates	Matches	Clubs
First round	22 August	2	66 → 64
Second round	11 September – 26 September	32	64 → 32
Third round	2 October – 31 October	16	32 → 16
Fourth round	7 November – 9 January	8	16 → 8
Quarterfinals	5 December – 13 February	4	8 → 4
Semifinals	13 March – 20 March	2	4 → 2
Final	4 April	1	2 → 1

=== Fixtures and results ===
Fixtures are listed in alphabetical order, not that which they were drawn in.

==== First round ====
Four clubs from Division Ones participated in the first round, while all other clubs received a bye to the second round.

Tie	Home team (tier)	Score	Away team (tier)	Att.
1	Metropolitan Police (S)	4–1	Godalming Town (S)	58
2	Tilbury (N)	2–3 (a.e.t.)	Wivenhoe Town (N)	44

==== Second round ====
The two clubs to have made it through the first round were entered into the second-round draw with all other Isthmian League clubs, making sixty-four teams.

Tie	Home team (tier)	Score	Away team (tier)	Att.
3	AFC Hornchurch (N)	4–0	Canvey Island (N)	346
4	AFC Wimbledon (P)	2–1	Hastings United (S)	619
5	Arlesey Town (N)	1–3 (a.e.t.)	Slough Town (P)	89
6	Ashford Town (Kent) (S)	2–0	Bromley (P)	137
7	Aveley (N)	1–3	AFC Sudbury (N)	71
8	Boreham Wood (P)	4–3	Enfield Town (N)	104
9	Carshalton Athletic (P)	1–3	Horsham (P)	142
10	Chatham Town (S)	0–1 (a.e.t.)	Dover Athletic (S)	163
11	Chelmsford City (P)	1–0	Wivenhoe Town (N)	362
12	Cray Wanderers (S)	3–1	Whyteleafe (S)	78
13	Croydon Athletic (S)	4–1	Sittingbourne (S)	22
14	Dartford (S)	2–2	Folkestone Invicta (P)	116
Dartford advance on penalties 5–3
15	East Thurrock United (P)	1–0	Billericay Town (P)	124
16	Flackwell Heath (N)	3–4	Hendon (P)	62
17	Great Wakering Rovers (N)	0–1	Redbridge (N)	55
18	Harrow Borough (P)	0–1	Enfield (N)	73

Tie	Home team (tier)	Score	Away team (tier)	Att.
19	Heybridge Swifts (P)	4–0	Ilford (N)	58
20	Kingstonian (S)	3–2	Hampton & Richmond Borough (P)	221
21	Leatherhead (S)	4–0	Molesey (S)	78
22	Leyton (P)	2–1	Witham Town (N)	40
23	Maldon Town (N)	2–1	Bury Town (N)	86
24	Ramsgate (P)	2–0	Margate (P)	783
25	Staines Town (P)	3–2 (a.e.t.)	Potters Bar Town (N)	82
26	Tonbridge Angels (P)	3–0	Maidstone United (S)	480
27	Tooting & Mitcham United (S)	1–1	Corinthian-Casuals (S)	100
Tooting & Mitcham United advance on penalties 8–7
28	Waltham Abbey (N)	0–1	Harlow Town (N)	83
29	Waltham Forest (N)	0–5	Fleet Town (S)	34
30	Walton & Hersham (P)	0–2	Metropolitan Police (S)	71
31	Walton Casuals (S)	4–1	Dulwich Hamlet (S)	40
32	Ware (N)	0–1	Ashford Town (Middx) (P)	83
33	Wingate & Finchley (N)	2–4 (a.e.t.)	Burgess Hill Town (S)	33
34	Worthing (P)	3–2	Horsham YMCA (S)	158

==== Third round ====
Tie	Home team (tier)	Score	Away team (tier)	Att.
35	AFC Sudbury (N)	2–1	Chelmsford City (P)	370
36	Ashford Town (Kent) (S)	2–4	Cray Wanderers (S)	65
37	Boreham Wood (P)	3–1	Harlow Town (N)	83
38	Burgess Hill Town (S)	2–3	AFC Wimbledon (P)	305
39	Croydon Athletic (S)	1–1	Tooting & Mitcham United (S)	94
Tooting & Mitcham United advance on penalties 4–3
40	Fleet Town (S)	3–4 (a.e.t.)	Enfield Town (N)	79
41	Hendon (P)	1–2	Staines Town (P)	85
42	Heybridge Swifts (P)	3–2	AFC Hornchurch (N)	142

Tie	Home team (tier)	Score	Away team (tier)	Att.
43	Horsham (P)	3–5 (a.e.t.)	Walton Casuals (S)	168
44	Leatherhead (S)	1–0	Worthing (P)	164
45	Leyton (P)	1–0	Maldon Town (N)	20
46	Metropolitan Police (S)	3–1	Kingstonian (S)	212
47	Ramsgate (P)	1–1	Dover Athletic (S)	264
Dover Athletic advance on penalties 8–7
48	Redbridge (N)	1–3 (a.e.t.)	East Thurrock United (P)	43
49	Slough Town (P)	0–4	Ashford Town (Middx) (P)	149
50	Tonbridge Angels (P)	1–3	Dartford (S)	253

==== Fourth round ====
Tie	Home team (tier)	Score	Away team (tier)	Att.
51	AFC Sudbury (N)	2–1	Metropolitan Police (S)	183
52	Ashford Town (Middx) (P)	2–1	Enfield (N)	109
53	Dartford (S)	0–3	Boreham Wood (P)	1,087
54	Dover Athletic (S)	1–0	East Thurrock United (P)	154

Tie	Home team (tier)	Score	Away team (tier)	Att.
55	Leyton (P)	2–3	Leatherhead (S)	15
56	Staines Town (P)	2–1	Heybridge Swifts (P)	113
57	Tooting & Mitcham United (S)	1–0	AFC Wimbledon (P)	941
58	Walton Casuals (S)	1–2	Cray Wanderers (S)	44

==== Quarterfinals ====
Tie	Home team (tier)	Score	Away team (tier)	Att.
59	Boreham Wood (P)	1–2	Cray Wanderers (S)	49
60	Dover Athletic (S)	2–1	Leatherhead (S)	215

Tie	Home team (tier)	Score	Away team (tier)	Att.
61	Staines Town (P)	3–1	AFC Sudbury (N)	121
62	Tooting & Mitcham United (S)	1–3	Ashford Town (Middx) (P)	104

==== Semifinals ====
Tie	Home team (tier)	Score	Away team (tier)	Att.
63	Dover Athletic (S)	4–3	Cray Wanderers (S)	203
64	Staines Town (P)	2–3	Ashford Town (Middx) (P)	369

==== Final ====
4 April 2007

Ashford Town (Middx) (P)	4–1	Dover Athletic (S)

Hayes Lane, Bromley
Attendance: 462

== See also ==
- Isthmian League
- 2006–07 Northern Premier League
- 2006–07 Southern Football League
