= 2004–05 Midland Football Alliance =

Midland Football Alliance
- Season: 2004–05
- Champions: Rushall Olympic
- Promoted: Rushall Olympic
- Relegated: Ludlow Town; Bridgnorth Town
- Matches: 462
- Goals: 1,496 (3.24 per match)

The 2004–05 Midland Football Alliance season was the eleventh in the history of Midland Football Alliance, a football competition in England.

== Clubs and league table ==
The league featured 19 clubs from the previous season, along with three new clubs:

- Loughborough Dynamo, promoted from the Leicestershire Senior League
- Malvern Town, promoted from the West Midlands (Regional) League
- Romulus, promoted from the Midland Football Combination

=== League table ===
Pos	Team	Pld	W	D	L	GF	GA	GD	Pts	Promotion or relegation
1	Rushall Olympic	42	27	7	8	88	44	+44	88	Promoted to the Southern Football League
2	Chasetown	42	25	6	11	78	45	+33	81	
3	Coalville Town	42	22	11	9	68	38	+30	77	
4	Quorn	42	21	11	10	78	52	+26	74	
5	Malvern Town	42	21	9	12	78	70	+8	72	
6	Westfields	42	18	13	11	61	48	+13	67	
7	Oadby Town	42	18	11	13	64	53	+11	65	
8	Stourbridge	42	19	7	16	85	65	+20	64	
9	Racing Club Warwick	42	19	7	16	79	68	+11	64	
10	Boldmere St. Michaels	42	19	7	16	79	70	+9	64	
11	Stratford Town	42	20	4	18	71	67	+4	64	
12	Romulus	42	17	11	14	74	66	+8	62	
13	Barwell	42	17	10	15	60	60	0	61	
14	Loughborough Dynamo	42	16	6	20	69	83	−14	54	
15	Alvechurch	42	16	5	21	75	69	+6	53	
16	Causeway United	42	12	9	21	53	68	−15	45	
17	Oldbury United	42	13	8	21	70	90	−20	44 (Note: Oldbury United deducted 3 points.)	
18	Studley	42	11	11	20	55	76	−21	44	
19	Cradley Town	42	12	7	23	59	84	−25	43	
20	Biddulph Victoria	42	10	11	21	59	83	−24	41	
21	Ludlow Town	42	12	5	25	55	84	−29	41	Relegated to the West Midlands (Regional) League
22	Bridgnorth Town	42	7	4	31	38	113	−75	25	Relegated to the Midland Football Combination

Source: fchd
Rules for classification: 1) points; 2) goal difference; 3) number of goals scored.
