= 2006–07 Southern Football League =

The 2006–07 season was the 104th in the history of the Southern League, which is an English football competition featuring semi-professional and amateur clubs from the South West, South Central and Midlands of England and South Wales. This season was the first to feature the new Division One sections after reform of the Isthmian League structure.

== Premier Division ==
The Premier Division consisted of 22 clubs, including 16 clubs from the previous season and six new clubs:

- Two clubs promoted from the Eastern Division:
  - Corby Town
  - Stamford
- Two clubs promoted from the Western Division:
  - Clevedon Town
  - Hemel Hempstead Town
- Plus:
  - Maidenhead United, relegated from the Conference South
  - Wealdstone, transferred from the Isthmian League

Bath City won the league and were promoted to the Conference South along with play-off winners Maidenhead United, who returned to the Conference after relegation in 2006. Only Northwood were relegated this season, and the other clubs finished in the relegation zone were reprieved due to Farnborough Town and Scarborough folding, and Hayes merging with Yeading.

=== League table ===
Southern Football League Premier Division
- Season: 2006–07
- Champions: Bath City
- Promoted: Bath City; Maidenhead United
- Relegated: Northwood
- Matches: 462
- Goals: 1,321 (2.86 per match)
- Top goalscorer: Anthony Thomas (Hemel Hempstead Town) – 25 including League Cup goals
- Biggest home win: Bath City 6 – 0 Rugby Town, 28 April 2007
- Biggest away win: Cirencester Town 1 – 6 King's Lynn, 2 September 2006; Maidenhead United 0 – 5 Clevedon Town, 23 September 2006
- Highest scoring: Cirencester Town 6 – 3 Northwood, 13 January 2007
- Highest attendance: 2044 (Bath City 1 – 0 Chippenham Town, 9 April 2007)
- Lowest attendance: 84 (Team Bath 1 – 0 Northwood, 18 November 2006)

Pos	Team	Pld	W	D	L	GF	GA	GD	Pts	Promotion or relegation
1	Bath City	42	27	10	5	84	29	+55	91	Promoted to the Conference South
2	Team Bath	42	23	9	10	66	42	+24	78	Qualified for the play-offs
3	King's Lynn	42	22	10	10	69	40	+29	76	Qualified for the play-offs
4	Maidenhead United	42	20	10	12	58	36	+22	70	Qualified for the play-offs, then promoted to the Conference South
5	Hemel Hempstead Town	42	19	12	11	79	60	+19	69	Qualified for the play-offs
6	Halesowen Town	42	18	13	11	66	53	+13	67	
7	Chippenham Town	42	19	9	14	61	56	+5	66	
8	Stamford	42	16	11	15	65	62	+3	59	Transferred to the Northern Premier League Premier Division
9	Mangotsfield United	42	13	19	10	44	45	−1	58	
10	Gloucester City	42	15	13	14	67	70	−3	58	
11	Hitchin Town	42	16	9	17	55	68	−13	57	
12	Merthyr Tydfil	42	14	14	14	47	46	+1	56	
13	Banbury United	42	15	10	17	60	64	−4	55	
14	Yate Town	42	14	12	16	59	71	−12	54	
15	Tiverton Town	42	14	8	20	56	67	−11	50	
16	Cheshunt	42	14	7	21	56	71	−15	49	
17	Rugby Town	42	15	4	23	58	79	−21	49	
18	Clevedon Town	42	12	12	18	60	61	−1	48	
19	Wealdstone	42	13	9	20	69	82	−13	48	Transferred to the Isthmian League Premier Division
20	Corby Town	42	10	9	23	52	69	−17	39	Reprieved from relegation (Note: Corby Town and Cirencester Town were reprieved from relegation due to Farnborough Town and Scarborough folding and Hayes merging with Yeading (see 2006–07 Football Conference).)
21	Cirencester Town	42	9	12	21	46	76	−30	39	Reprieved from relegation
22	Northwood	42	8	10	24	44	74	−30	34	Relegated to Isthmian League Division One North

Source: fchd.com
Rules for classification: 1) points; 2) goal difference; 3) number of goals scored.

=== Play-offs ===
Semifinals
2	Team Bath	3
5	Hemel Hempstead Town	1
3	King's Lynn	0
4	Maidenhead United	1

Final
2	Team Bath	0
4	Maidenhead United	1

=== Stadia and locations ===
Locations of the Premier Division clubs

Club	Stadium
Banbury United	Spencer Stadium
Bath City	Twerton Park
Cheshunt	Cheshunt Stadium
Chippenham Town	Hardenhuish Park
Cirencester Town	Corinium Stadium
Clevedon Town	Hand Stadium
Corby Town	Steel Park
Gloucester City	Meadow Park, Gloucester
Halesowen Town	The Grove
Hemel Hempstead Town	Vauxhall Road
Hitchin Town	Top Field
King's Lynn	The Walks
Maidenhead United	York Road
Mangotsfield United	Cossham Street
Merthyr Tydfil	Penydarren Park
Northwood	Chestnut Avenue
Rugby Town	Butlin Road
Stamford	Hanson's Field
Team Bath	Twerton Park (groundshare with Bath City)
Tiverton Town	Ladysmead
Wealdstone	Chestnut Avenue (groundshare with Northwood)
Yate Town	Lodge Road

== Division One Midlands ==
After the end of the previous season, the regional divisions were restructured due to the reorganisation of the Isthmian League. Most of the previous season's Eastern Division clubs were transferred to the Isthmian League. Southern League Eastern and Western divisions were replaced by Division One Midlands and Division One South & West.

Brackley Town won the division and were promoted to the Premier Division along with play-off winners Bromsgrove Rovers. Both clubs that finished in the relegation zone were reprieved, due to clubs folding or resigning from other leagues.

=== League formation ===
Division One Midlands consisted of 22 clubs, including 16 clubs from previous season Southern League divisions and six new clubs:

- Clubs relegated from the Premier Division:
  - Aylesbury United
  - Evesham United
- Clubs from the Western Division:
  - Bedworth United
  - Brackley Town
  - Bromsgrove Rovers
  - Cinderford Town
  - Dunstable Town
  - Leighton Town
  - Rushall Olympic
  - Solihull Borough
  - Stourport Swifts
  - Sutton Coldfield Town
  - Willenhall Town
- Clubs from the Eastern Division:
  - Barton Rovers
  - Berkhamsted Town
  - Rothwell Town
- Clubs promoted from the Midland Alliance:
  - Chasetown
  - Malvern Town
  - Stourbridge
- Plus:
  - Bishop's Cleeve, promoted from the Hellenic League
  - Spalding United, transferred from Northern Premier League Division One
  - Woodford United, promoted from the United Counties League

=== League table ===
Southern Football League Division One Midlands
- Season: 2006–07
- Champions: Brackley Town
- Promoted: Brackley Town; Bromsgrove Rovers
- Matches: 462
- Goals: 1,391 (3.01 per match)
- Top goalscorer: Nathan Lamey (Bromsgrove Rovers) – 31 including League Cup goals
- Biggest home win: Brackley Town 7 – 0 Barton Rovers, 28 November 2006
- Biggest away win: Bromsgrove Rovers 1 – 7 Cinderford Town, 4 November 2006
- Highest scoring: 8 goals – 8 matches
- Highest attendance: 544 (Bromsgrove Rovers 2 – 0 Brackley Town, 17 March 2007), (Stourbridge 3 – 3 Bromsgrove Rovers, 14 November 2006)
- Lowest attendance: 40 (Bishop's Cleeve 2 – 3 Rothwell Town, 2 March 2007)
- Average attendance: 146

Pos	Team	Pld	W	D	L	GF	GA	GD	Pts	Promotion or relegation
1	Brackley Town	42	29	4	9	95	53	+42	91	Promoted to the Premier Division
2	Bromsgrove Rovers	42	23	7	12	86	62	+24	76	Qualified for the play-offs, then promoted to the Premier Division
3	Chasetown	42	23	6	13	59	39	+20	75	Qualified for the play-offs
4	Willenhall Town	42	20	12	10	67	47	+20	72	Qualified for the play-offs
5	Evesham United	42	19	15	8	66	51	+15	72	Qualified for the play-offs
6	Aylesbury United	42	20	11	11	58	42	+16	71	
7	Stourbridge	42	17	15	10	70	53	+17	66	
8	Woodford United	42	18	11	13	71	54	+17	65	
9	Cinderford Town	42	18	10	14	70	60	+10	64	
10	Rothwell Town	42	18	7	17	72	61	+11	61	
11	Dunstable Town	42	16	12	14	64	53	+11	60	
12	Sutton Coldfield Town	42	16	9	17	62	63	−1	57	
13	Bishop's Cleeve	42	17	5	20	68	66	+2	56	
14	Solihull Borough	42	17	5	20	72	84	−12	56	Merged into Solihull Moors
15	Rushall Olympic	42	15	9	18	56	55	+1	54	
16	Bedworth United	42	13	8	21	73	83	−10	47	
17	Malvern Town	42	12	11	19	46	66	−20	47	
18	Leighton Town	42	12	8	22	44	60	−16	44	
19	Spalding United	42	12	6	24	45	62	−17	42	Transferred to NPL Division One South
20	Barton Rovers	42	11	9	22	51	93	−42	42	
21	Berkhamsted Town	42	10	7	25	53	97	−44	37	Reprieved from relegation (Note: Berkhamsted Town and Stourport Swifts were reprieved from relegation as they were the two clubs in the relegation zones of the Midland and South & West Divisions with the highest points total. These two clubs were not relegated due to space created by clubs moving across to the restructured first divisions of the Northern Premier League and Lymington & New Milton (of the South & West Division) and Solihull Borough withdrawing from the league.)
22	Stourport Swifts	42	9	7	26	43	87	−44	34	Reprieved from relegation

Source: fchd.com
Rules for classification: 1) points; 2) goal difference; 3) number of goals scored.

=== Play-offs ===
Semifinals
2	Bromsgrove Rovers	1
5	Evesham United	0
3	Chasetown	0
4	Willenhall Town	1

Final
2	Bromsgrove Rovers	2
4	Willenhall Town	1

=== Stadia and locations ===
Locations of Division One Midlands clubs

Club	Stadium
Aylesbury United	The Meadow (groundshare with Chesham United)
Barton Rovers	Sharpenhoe Road
Bedworth United	The Oval
Berkhamsted	Broadwater
Bishops Cleeve	Kayte Lane
Brackley Town	St. James Park
Bromsgrove Rovers	Victoria Ground
Chasetown	The Scholars Ground
Cinderford Town	Causeway Ground
Dunstable Town	Creasey Park
Evesham United	St George's Lane (groundshare with Worcester City)
Leighton Town	Bell Close
Malvern Town	Langland Stadium
Rothwell Town	Cecil Street
Rushall Olympic	Dales Lane
Solihull Borough	Damson Park
Spalding United	Sir Halley Stewart Field
Stourbridge	War Memorial Athletic Ground
Stourport Swifts	Walshes Meadow
Sutton Coldfield Town	The Central Ground
Willenhall Town	Noose Lane
Woodford United	Byfield Road

== Division One South & West ==
After the end of the previous season, the regional divisions were restructured due to the reorganisation of the Isthmian League. Most of the previous season's Eastern Division clubs were transferred to the Isthmian League. Southern League Eastern and Western divisions were replaced by Division One Midlands and Division One South & West.

Bashley won the division and were promoted to the Premier Division along with play-off winners Swindon Supermarine. Hanwell Town and Beaconsfield SYCOB were relegated to the Spartan South Midlands League, while Lymington & New Milton resigned from the league before the next season started.

=== League formation ===
Division One South & West consisted of 22 clubs, including nine clubs from previous season Southern League divisions and 13 new clubs:

- Clubs joined from the Western Division:
  - Beaconsfield SYCOB
  - Bracknell Town
  - Burnham
  - Marlow
  - Paulton Rovers
  - Swindon Supermarine
  - Taunton Town
- Clubs transferred from Isthmian League Division One:
  - Bashley
  - Lymington & New Milton
  - Newport (Isle of Wight)
- Clubs promoted from the Hellenic League:
  - Abingdon United
  - Didcot Town
- Clubs promoted from the Spartan South Midlands League:
  - Hanwell Town
  - Hillingdon Borough
  - Oxford City
- Clubs promoted from the Wessex League:
  - Andover
  - Thatcham Town
  - Winchester City
- Plus:
  - Brook House, promoted from Isthmian League Division Two
  - Chesham United, relegated from the Premier Division
  - Uxbridge, joined the Eastern Division
  - Windsor & Eton, relegated from Isthmian League Premier Division

At the end of the season Brook House changed name to AFC Hayes.

=== League table ===
Southern Football League Division One South & West
- Season: 2006–07
- Champions: Bashley
- Promoted: Bashley; Swindon Supermarine
- Relegated: Lymington & New Milton; Hanwell Town; Beaconsfield SYCOB
- Matches: 462
- Goals: 1,511 (3.27 per match)

Pos	Team	Pld	W	D	L	GF	GA	GD	Pts	Promotion or relegation
1	Bashley	42	32	6	4	111	35	+76	102	Promoted to the Premier Division
2	Paulton Rovers	42	20	14	8	66	42	+24	74	Qualified for the play-offs
3	Burnham	42	23	4	15	74	60	+14	73	Qualified for the play-offs
4	Swindon Supermarine	42	20	11	11	68	40	+28	71	Qualified for the play-offs, then promoted to the Premier Division
5	Taunton Town	42	19	14	9	68	50	+18	71	Qualified for the play-offs
6	Thatcham Town	42	21	7	14	70	60	+10	70	
7	Marlow	42	19	12	11	74	49	+25	69	
8	Uxbridge	42	20	8	14	68	58	+10	68	
9	Andover	42	19	9	14	70	59	+11	66	
10	Didcot Town	42	16	13	13	86	67	+19	61	
11	Abingdon United	42	16	11	15	68	67	+1	59	
12	Oxford City	42	17	8	17	62	75	−13	59	
13	Winchester City	42	16	10	16	67	65	+2	58	
14	Windsor & Eton	42	16	10	16	76	75	+1	58	
15	Chesham United	42	17	6	19	68	79	−11	57	Transferred to Division One Midlands
16	Hillingdon Borough	42	13	13	16	80	85	−5	52	
17	Lymington & New Milton	42	16	3	23	81	79	+2	51	Resigned to the Wessex League
18	Brook House	42	14	6	22	71	92	−21	48	
19	Bracknell Town	42	11	13	18	51	62	−11	46	
20	Newport (Isle of Wight)	42	9	3	30	44	106	−62	30	
21	Hanwell Town	42	6	7	29	52	102	−50	24 (Note: Hanwell Town deducted 1 point for fielding an ineligible player.)	Relegated to the Spartan South Midlands League
22	Beaconsfield SYCOB	42	5	6	31	36	104	−68	21	Relegated to the Spartan South Midlands League

Source: fchd.com
Rules for classification: 1) points; 2) goal difference; 3) number of goals scored.

=== Play-offs ===
Semifinals
2	Paulton Rovers	1
5	Taunton Town	4
3	Burnham	1
4	Swindon Supermarine	2

Final
5	Taunton Town	0
4	Swindon Supermarine	2

=== Stadia and locations ===
Locations of Division One South & West clubs
Greater London Division One South & West clubs

Club	Stadium
Abingdon United	Northcourt Road
Andover	Portway Stadium
Bashley	Bashley Road
Beaconsfield SYCOB	Holloways Park
Bracknell Town	Larges Lane
Brook House	Farm Park
Burnham	The Gore
Chesham United	The Meadow
Didcot Town	Draycott Engineering Loop Meadow Stadium
Hanwell Town	Reynolds Field
Hillingdon Borough	Middlesex Stadium
Lymington & New Milton	Fawcetts Field
Marlow	Alfred Davis Memorial Ground
Newport (Isle of Wight)	St Georges Park
Oxford City	Court Place Farm
Paulton Rovers	Athletic Field
Swindon Supermarine	Hunts Copse Ground
Taunton Town	Wordsworth Drive
Thatcham Town	Waterside Park
Uxbridge	Honeycroft
Winchester City	The City Ground
Windsor & Eton	Stag Meadow

== League Cup ==
2006–07 Southern League Cup
Tournament details
- Country: England
- Teams: 66

Final positions
- Champions: Tiverton Town
- Runners-up: Hemel Hempstead Town

=== First round ===
Clubs playing in the Southern League Premier Division were exempt from the first round. All teams in the two divisions One entered the competition at this stage.

Tie	Home team (tier)	Score	Away team (tier)	Att.
1	Rushall Olympic (M)	0–1	Bedworth United (M)	
2	Woodford United (M)	7–0	Leighton Town (M)	
3	Sutton Coldfield Town (M)	1–5	Willenhall Town (M)	
4	Paulton Rovers (SW)	1–2	Andover (SW)	
After extra time
5	Abingdon United (SW)	0–2	Oxford City (SW)	
6	Barton Rovers (M)	2–1	Aylesbury United (M)	
7	Bashley (SW)	2–3	Winchester City (SW)	
8	Berkhamsted Town (M)	1–2	Dunstable Town (M)	
9	Brook House (SW)	3–2	Bracknell Town (SW)	
After extra time
10	Chasetown (M)	1–0	Bromsgrove Rovers (M)	
11	Chesham United (M)	4–0	Burnham (SW)	

Tie	Home team (tier)	Score	Away team (tier)	Att.
12	Cinderford Town (M)	0–5	Malvern Town (M)	
13	Didcot Town (SW)	3–2	Brackley Town (M)	
14	Hanwell Town (SW)	0–1	Windsor & Eton (SW)	
15	Hillingdon Borough (SW)	4–3	Marlow (SW)	
After extra time
16	Spalding United (M)	4–1	Rothwell Town (M)	
17	Stourbridge (M)	4–3	Evesham United (M)	
18	Thatcham Town (SW)	1–1	Swindon Supermarine (SW)	
Thatcham Town won 3–2 on penalties
19	Uxbridge (SW)	2–1	Beaconsfield SYCOB (SW)	
20	Bishop's Cleeve (M)	0–1	Taunton Town (SW)	
21	Newport (IoW) (SW)	0–2	Lymington & New Milton (SW)	
22	Solihull Borough (M)	1–3	Stourport Swifts (M)	

=== Second round ===
Cirencester Town and Northwood entered at this stage along with all the clubs who won their first round ties. All other Premier Division clubs were exempt.

Tie	Home team (tier)	Score	Away team (tier)	Att.
23	Cirencester Town (P)	0–4	Didcot Town (SW)	
24	Northwood (P)	0–1	Chesham United (M)	
25	Andover (SW)	1–3	Thatcham Town (SW)	
26	Barton Rovers (M)	1–2	Uxbridge (SW)	
27	Bedworth United (M)	0–1	Stourport Swifts (M)	
28	Chasetown (M)	1–0	Malvern Town (M)	

Tie	Home team (tier)	Score	Away team (tier)	Att.
29	Hillingdon Borough (SW)	1–3	Brook House (SW)	
30	Stourbridge (M)	3–0	Spalding United (M)	
31	Windsor & Eton (SW)	1–2	Dunstable Town (M)	
32	Lymington & New Milton (SW)	1–0	Winchester City (SW)	
33	Taunton Town (SW)	1–0	Oxford City (SW)	
34	Willenhall Town (M)	2–1	Woodford United (M)	

=== Third round ===
All clubs who had been previously exempt entered at this stage of the competition along with the 12 teams who won their second round fixtures.

Tie	Home team (tier)	Score	Away team (tier)	Att.
35	Chippenham Town (P)	1–2	Lymington & New Milton (SW)	
36	Hitchin Town (P)	0–1	Corby Town (P)	
37	Rugby Town (P)	2–1	Halesowen Town (P)	
After extra time
38	Stamford (P)	1–2	King's Lynn (P)	
39	Stourport Swifts (M)	0–1	Stourbridge (M)	
40	Uxbridge (SW)	1–3	Brook House (SW)	
After extra time
41	Wealdstone (P)	0–2	Cheshunt (P)	
42	Taunton Town (SW)	2–3	Mangotsfield United (P)	

Tie	Home team (tier)	Score	Away team (tier)	Att.
43	Banbury United (P)	2–0	Chesham United (M)	
44	Maidenhead United (P)	1–3	Thatcham Town (SW)	
After extra time
45	Hemel Hempstead Town (P)	3–0	Dunstable Town (M)	
46	Merthyr Tydfil (P)	1–0	Team Bath (P)	
47	Tiverton Town (P)	4–2	Yate Town (P)	
48	Clevedon Town (P)	0–1	Bath City (P)	
49	Gloucester City (P)	2–3	Didcot Town (SW)	
After extra time
50	Chasetown (M)	2–1	Willenhall Town (M)	

=== Fourth round ===
Tie	Home team (tier)	Score	Away team (tier)	Att.
51	Cheshunt (P)	5–0	Brook House (SW)	
52	King's Lynn (P)	2–1	Corby Town (P)	
53	Tiverton Town (P)	3–1	Bath City (P)	
54	Lymington & New Milton (SW)	0–1	Mangotsfield United (P)	

Tie	Home team (tier)	Score	Away team (tier)	Att.
55	Banbury United (P)	1–0	Chasetown (M)	
56	Rugby Town (P)	2–1	Stourbridge (M)	
57	Thatcham Town (SW)	2–3	Hemel Hempstead Town (P)	
58	Didcot Town (SW)	4–1	Merthyr Tydfil (P)	

=== Quarter-finals ===
Tie	Home team (tier)	Score	Away team (tier)	Att.
59	Hemel Hempstead Town (P)	3–2	Cheshunt (P)	
60	King's Lynn (P)	0–1	Rugby Town (P)	

Tie	Home team (tier)	Score	Away team (tier)	Att.
61	Tiverton Town (P)	2–0	Mangotsfield United (P)	
62	Didcot Town (SW)	1–3	Banbury United (P)	

=== Semi-finals ===
Tie	Home team (tier)	Score	Away team (tier)	Att.
63	Rugby Town (P)	3–4	Hemel Hempstead Town (P)	
64	Tiverton Town (P)	2–0	Banbury United (P)	

=== Final ===
Tie	Home team (tier)	Score	Away team (tier)	Att.
65	Hemel Hempstead Town (P)	0–1	Tiverton Town (P)	
66	Tiverton Town (P)	2–2	Hemel Hempstead Town (P)	

== See also ==
- Southern Football League
- 2006–07 Isthmian League
- 2006–07 Northern Premier League
