= 2004–05 Essex Senior Football League =

The 2004–05 season was the 34th in the history of Essex Senior Football League, a football competition in England.

The league featured 15 clubs which competed in the league last season, no new clubs joined the league this season. Though, Bowers United merged with Pitsea, renaming to Bowers & Pitsea, whilst Brentwood changed name to Brentwood Town.

Enfield Town were champions, winning their second Essex Senior League title and were promoted to the Southern League to the same division with original Enfield.

== League table ==
Essex Senior Football League
- Season: 2004–05
- Champions: Enfield Town
- Promoted: Enfield Town
- Matches: 210
- Goals: 707 (3.37 per match)

Pos	Team	Pld	W	D	L	GF	GA	GD	Pts	Promotion or relegation
1	Enfield Town	28	20	6	2	62	21	+41	66	Promoted to the Southern League
2	Burnham Ramblers	28	21	2	5	63	34	+29	65	
3	Waltham Abbey	28	19	2	7	61	29	+32	58 (Note: Waltham Abbey were deducted one point.)	
4	Barkingside	28	16	7	5	62	31	+31	55	
5	Romford	28	16	5	7	56	40	+16	53	
6	Southend Manor	28	14	5	9	51	44	+7	47	
7	Basildon United	28	14	4	10	42	31	+11	46	
8	Sawbridgeworth Town	28	11	9	8	47	36	+11	42	
9	Concord Rangers	28	12	3	13	50	44	+6	39	
10	Bowers & Pitsea	28	9	7	12	53	53	0	34	
11	Stansted	28	7	4	17	41	74	−33	25	
12	Eton Manor	28	6	3	19	34	62	−28	21	
13	London APSA	28	5	4	19	33	72	−39	19	
14	Brentwood Town	28	3	7	18	30	66	−36	16	
15	Hullbridge Sports	28	1	4	23	22	70	−48	7	

Source: fchd
Rules for classification: 1) points; 2) goal difference; 3) number of goals scored.
