= 2005–06 Essex Senior Football League =

The 2005–06 season was the 35th in the history of Essex Senior Football League a football competition in England.

The league featured 14 clubs which competed in the league last season, along with two new clubs:

- AFC Hornchurch, reformed club after Hornchurch folded
- Tilbury, relegated from the Southern League

New phoenix club AFC Hornchurch were champions, winning their first Essex Senior League title and were promoted to the Istmian League along with Tilbury, who left the league at the first attempt and Waltham Abbey, who were promoted to the Isthmian League for the first time in their history. Three clubs were promoted due to creation of the new eighth level division under Isthmian League.

== League table ==
Essex Senior Football League
- Season: 2005–06
- Champions: AFC Hornchurch
- Promoted: AFC Hornchurch; Waltham Abbey; Tilbury
- Matches: 240
- Goals: 741 (3.09 per match)

Pos	Team	Pld	W	D	L	GF	GA	GD	Pts	Promotion or relegation
1	AFC Hornchurch	30	25	3	2	71	21	+50	78	Promoted to the Isthmian League
2	Waltham Abbey	30	18	6	6	64	28	+36	60	Promoted to the Isthmian League
3	Tilbury	30	16	7	7	63	37	+26	55	Promoted to the Isthmian League
4	Barkingside	30	15	10	5	44	30	+14	55	
5	Burnham Ramblers	30	15	9	6	72	44	+28	54	
6	Sawbridgeworth Town	30	12	11	7	47	28	+19	47	
7	Concord Rangers	30	14	5	11	36	32	+4	47	
8	Brentwood Town	30	11	7	12	46	41	+5	40	
9	London APSA	30	7	11	12	36	52	−16	32	
10	Southend Manor	30	9	5	16	37	57	−20	32	
11	Basildon United	30	8	8	14	47	76	−29	31 (Note: Basildon United were deducted one point.)	
12	Romford	30	6	11	13	38	54	−16	29	
13	Eton Manor	30	6	8	16	35	57	−22	26	
14	Hullbridge Sports	30	6	7	17	38	60	−22	25	
15	Bowers & Pitsea	30	7	4	19	36	65	−29	25	
16	Stansted	30	5	8	17	31	59	−28	23	

Source: fchd
Rules for classification: 1) points; 2) goal difference; 3) number of goals scored.
