= 2005–06 Southern Football League =

The 2005–06 season was the 103rd in the history of the Southern League, which is an English football competition featuring semi-professional and amateur clubs from the South West, South Central and Midlands of England and South Wales.

At the end of the season Eastern and Western divisions were restructured after a single Division One of the Isthmian League was divided into Division One North and Division One South, while large number of the clubs left to the Isthmian League. For the next season regional divisions were renamed Division One Midlands and Division One South & West.

== Premier Division ==
The Premier Division consisted of 22 clubs, including 16 clubs from last season, and six new clubs:

- Three clubs were transferred from the Isthmian League Premier Division:
  - Cheshunt
  - Northwood
  - Salisbury City
- Three were promoted from the Western Division:
  - Evesham United
  - Mangotsfield United
  - Yate Town

Salisbury City won the division and were promoted to the Conference along with play-off winners Bedford Town, both clubs for the first time in their history. Aylesbury United, Chesham United and Evesham United were relegated to the Division One.

=== League table ===
Southern Football League Premier Division
- Season: 2005–06
- Champions: Salisbury City
- Promoted: Bedford Town; Salisbury City
- Relegated: Aylesbury United; Chesham United; Evesham United
- Matches: 462
- Goals: 1,325 (2.87 per match)

Pos	Team	Pld	W	D	L	GF	GA	GD	Pts	Promotion or relegation
1	Salisbury City	42	30	5	7	83	27	+56	95	Promoted to the Conference South
2	Bath City	42	25	8	9	66	33	+33	83	Qualified for the play-offs
3	King's Lynn	42	25	7	10	73	41	+32	82	Qualified for the play-offs
4	Chippenham Town	42	22	11	9	69	45	+24	77	Qualified for the play-offs
5	Bedford Town	42	22	10	10	69	53	+16	76	Qualified for the play-offs, then promoted to the Conference South
6	Yate Town	42	21	5	16	78	74	+4	68	
7	Banbury United	42	17	11	14	66	61	+5	62	
8	Halesowen Town	42	15	15	12	54	45	+9	60	
9	Merthyr Tydfil	42	17	9	16	62	58	+4	60	
10	Mangotsfield United	42	15	13	14	67	67	0	58	
11	Grantham Town	42	15	11	16	49	49	0	56	Transferred to the Northern Premier League
12	Tiverton Town	42	14	10	18	69	65	+4	52	
13	Gloucester City	42	14	10	18	57	60	−3	52	
14	Hitchin Town	42	13	12	17	59	76	−17	51	
15	Rugby Town	42	13	11	18	58	66	−8	50	
16	Cheshunt	42	13	9	20	57	70	−13	48	
17	Team Bath	42	14	6	22	55	68	−13	48	
18	Cirencester Town	42	14	4	24	49	68	−19	46	
19	Northwood	42	12	6	24	53	88	−35	42 (Note: Northwood had superior record to same placed Isthmian League team, and consequently kept place in the division.)	
20	Evesham United	42	9	14	19	46	58	−12	41	Relegated to Division One Midlands
21	Aylesbury United	42	9	12	21	43	69	−26	39	Relegated to Division One Midlands
22	Chesham United	42	9	9	24	43	84	−41	36	Relegated to Division One South & West

Source: fchd.com
Rules for classification: 1) points; 2) goal difference; 3) number of goals scored.

=== Play-offs ===
Semifinals
2	Bath City	0
5	Bedford Town	1
3	King's Lynn	1
4	Chippenham Town	3

Final
5	Bedford Town	3
4	Chippenham Town	2

=== Stadia and locations ===
Locations of the Premier Division clubs

Club	Stadium
Aylesbury United	Buckingham Road
Banbury United	Spencer Stadium
Bath City	Twerton Park
Bedford Town	The Eyrie
Chesham United	The Meadow
Cheshunt	Cheshunt Stadium
Chippenham Town	Hardenhuish Park
Cirencester Town	Corinium Stadium
Evesham United	Common Road
Gloucester City	Meadow Park, Gloucester
Grantham Town	South Kesteven Sports Stadium
Halesowen Town	The Grove
Hitchin Town	Top Field
King's Lynn	The Walks
Mangotsfield United	Cossham Street
Merthyr Tydfil	Penydarren Park
Northwood	Chestnut Avenue
Rugby Town	Butlin Road
Salisbury City	Raymond McEnhill Stadium
Team Bath	Twerton Park (groundshare with Bath City)
Tiverton Town	Ladysmead
Yate Town	Lodge Road

== Eastern Division ==
The Eastern Division consisted of 22 clubs, including 15 clubs from last season, and seven new clubs:

- Two clubs transferred from Western Division:
  - Corby Town
  - Rothwell Town
- Two clubs promoted from Isthmian League Division Two:
  - Enfield
  - Ilford
- Plus:
  - Enfield Town, promoted from the Essex Senior League
  - Potters Bar Town, promoted from the Spartan South Midlands League
  - Stamford, relegated from the Premier Division

Boreham Wood won the division and returned to the Premier Division of the Isthmian League after relegation in 2003. Runners-up Corby Town and play-off winners Stamford promoted to the Premier Division. At the end of the season a single Division One of the Isthmian League was divided into Division One North and Division One South. Fifteen Eastern division clubs left the Southern League and joined new divisions, while Eastern and Western divisions were renamed Division One Midlands and Division One South & West.

=== League table ===
Southern Football League Eastern Division
- Season: 2005–06
- Champions: Boreham Wood
- Promoted: Boreham Wood; Corby Town; Stamford
- Matches: 462
- Goals: 1,302 (2.82 per match)

Pos	Team	Pld	W	D	L	GF	GA	GD	Pts	Promotion or relegation
1	Boreham Wood	42	24	12	6	84	41	+43	84	Promoted to IL Premier Division
2	Corby Town	42	25	9	8	63	33	+30	84	Promoted to the Premier Division
3	Enfield Town	42	24	9	9	75	43	+32	81	Qualified for the play-offs, then transferred to IL Division One North
4	Stamford	42	20	10	12	73	53	+20	70	Qualified for the play-offs, then promoted to the Premier Division
5	Barking & East Ham United	42	20	10	12	63	47	+16	70	Qualified for the play-offs, then transferred to IL Division One North
6	Wivenhoe Town	42	17	11	14	56	54	+2	62	Qualified for the play-offs, then transferred to IL Division One North
7	Dartford	42	16	13	13	65	57	+8	61	Transferred to IL Division One South
8	Waltham Forest	42	17	8	17	64	66	−2	59	Transferred to IL Division One North
9	Harlow Town	42	14	16	12	57	56	+1	58	Transferred to IL Division One North
10	Arlesey Town	42	15	11	16	58	65	−7	56	Transferred to IL Division One North
11	Rothwell Town	42	13	14	15	48	53	−5	53	Placed in Division One Midlands
12	Wingate & Finchley	42	13	14	15	57	64	−7	53	Transferred to IL Division One North
13	Great Wakering Rovers	42	13	12	17	65	67	−2	51	Transferred to IL Division One North
14	Uxbridge	42	13	11	18	62	64	−2	50	Placed in Division One South & West
15	Potters Bar Town	42	13	11	18	60	66	−6	50	Transferred to IL Division One North
16	Enfield	42	13	11	18	52	64	−12	50	Transferred to IL Division One North
17	Chatham Town	42	13	10	19	51	57	−6	49	Transferred to IL Division One South
18	Sittingbourne	42	12	12	18	53	69	−16	48	Transferred to IL Division One South
19	Barton Rovers	42	13	8	21	59	73	−14	47	Placed in Division One Midlands
20	Aveley	42	11	13	18	51	70	−19	46	Transferred to IL Division One North
21	Ilford	42	8	17	17	35	59	−24	41	Transferred to IL Division One North
22	Berkhamsted Town	42	8	12	22	51	81	−30	36	Placed in Division One Midlands

Source: fchd.com
Rules for classification: 1) points; 2) goal difference; 3) number of goals scored.

=== Play-offs ===
Semifinals
2	Enfield Town	1
5	Wivenhoe Town	3*
3	Stamford	3
4	Barking & East Ham United	2

Final
5	Wivenhoe Town	1
3	Stamford	2

* after extra time

=== Stadia and locations ===
Locations of the Eastern Division clubs
Greater London Eastern Division clubs

Club	Stadium
Arlesey Town	Hitchin Road
Aveley	The Mill Field
Barking & East Ham United	Mayesbrook Park
Barton Rovers	Sharpenhoe Road
Berkhamsted	Broadwater
Boreham Wood	Meadow Park
Chatham Town	The Sports Ground
Dartford	Stonebridge Road (groundshare with Gravesend & Northfleet)
Corby Town	Steel Park
Enfield	Wodson Park (groundshare with Ware)
Enfield Town	Goldsdown Road (groundshare with Brimsdown Rovers)
Great Wakering Rovers	Burroughs Park
Harlow Town	Barrows Farm
Ilford	Cricklefield Stadium
Potters Bar Town	Parkfield
Rothwell Town	Cecil Street
Sittingbourne	Bourne Park
Stamford	Hanson's Field
Uxbridge	Honeycroft
Waltham Forest	Wadham Lodge
Wingate & Finchley	The Harry Abrahams Stadium
Wivenhoe Town	Broad Lane

== Western Division ==
Southern Football League Western Division
- Season: 2005–06
- Champions: Clevedon Town
- Promoted: Ashford Town (Middlesex); Clevedon Town; Hemel Hempstead Town
- Relegated: Thame United
- Matches: 462
- Goals: 1,411 (3.05 per match)

The Western Division consisted of 22 clubs, including 15 clubs from last season, and seven new clubs:

- Three clubs relegated from the Premier Division:
  - Dunstable Town
  - Hemel Hempstead Town
  - Solihull Borough
- Two clubs transferred from the Eastern Division:
  - Beaconsfield SYCOB,
  - Leighton Town
- Plus:
  - Rushall Olympic, promoted from the Midland Alliance
  - Willenhall Town, transferred from the Northern Premier League Division One

Clevedon Town won the title and were promoted to the Premier Division along with play-off winners Hemel Hempstead Town, returning after relegation in 2004. Runners-up Ashford Town were promoted and transferred to the Isthmian League Premier Division. Thame United finished bottom and were the only Southern League club relegated from the league. Remaining clubs were divided between the newly formed Division One Midlands and Division One South & West.

=== League table ===
Pos	Team	Pld	W	D	L	GF	GA	GD	Pts	Promotion or relegation
1	Clevedon Town	42	28	6	8	86	45	+41	90	Promoted to the Premier Division
2	Ashford Town (Middlesex)	42	24	8	10	84	50	+34	80	Promoted to Isthmian League Premier Division
3	Brackley Town	42	23	9	10	71	34	+37	78	Qualified for play-offs, then placed in Division One Midlands
4	Hemel Hempstead Town	42	22	9	11	86	47	+39	75	Qualified for play-offs, then promoted to the Premier Division
5	Swindon Supermarine	42	22	9	11	70	47	+23	75	Qualified for play-offs, then placed in Division One South & West
6	Marlow	42	22	6	14	62	59	+3	72	Qualified for play-offs, then placed in Division One South & West
7	Sutton Coldfield Town	42	21	6	15	91	62	+29	69	Placed in Division One Midlands
8	Leighton Town	42	19	8	15	55	48	+7	65	Placed in Division One Midlands
9	Willenhall Town	42	17	12	13	78	61	+17	63	Placed in Division One Midlands
10	Rushall Olympic	42	17	11	14	73	57	+16	62	Placed in Division One Midlands
11	Bromsgrove Rovers	42	17	11	14	65	50	+15	62	Placed in Division One Midlands
12	Solihull Borough	42	15	13	14	50	51	−1	58	Placed in Division One Midlands
13	Beaconsfield SYCOB	42	14	13	15	60	66	−6	55	Placed in Division One South & West
14	Burnham	42	16	5	21	58	71	−13	53	Placed in Division One South & West
15	Cinderford Town	42	14	9	19	71	79	−8	51	Placed in Division One Midlands
16	Bedworth United	42	14	9	19	46	57	−11	51	Placed in Division One Midlands
17	Paulton Rovers	42	12	10	20	55	76	−21	46	Placed in Division One South & West
18	Taunton Town	42	12	9	21	67	81	−14	45	Placed in Division One South & West
19	Bracknell Town	42	12	6	24	53	77	−24	42	Placed in Division One South & West
20	Stourport Swifts	42	9	14	19	55	80	−25	41	Placed in Division One Midlands
21	Dunstable Town	42	8	12	22	45	91	−46	36	Placed in Division One Midlands
22	Thame United	42	4	5	33	30	122	−92	17	Relegated to the Hellenic League

Source: fchd.com
Rules for classification: 1) points; 2) goal difference; 3) number of goals scored.

=== Play-offs ===
Semifinals
2	Brackley Town	2
5	Marlow	1
3	Hemel Hempstead Town	3
4	Swindon Supermarine	0

Final
2	Brackley Town	2
3	Hemel Hempstead Town	3

=== Stadia and locations ===
Locations of the Western Division clubs

Club	Stadium
Ashford Town (Middlesex)	The Robert Parker Stadium
Beaconsfield SYCOB	Holloways Park
Bedworth United	The Oval
Brackley Town	St. James Park
Bracknell Town	Larges Lane
Bromsgrove Rovers	Victoria Ground
Burnham	The Gore
Cinderford Town	Causeway Ground
Clevedon Town	Hand Stadium
Dunstable Town	Creasey Park
Hemel Hempstead Town	Vauxhall Road
Leighton Town	Bell Close
Marlow	Alfred Davis Memorial Ground
Paulton Rovers	Athletic Field
Rushall Olympic	Dales Lane
Solihull Borough	Damson Park
Stourport Swifts	Walshes Meadow
Sutton Coldfield Town	The Central Ground
Swindon Supermarine	Hunts Copse Ground
Taunton Town	Wordsworth Drive
Thame United	Buckingham Road (groundshare with Aylesbury United)
Willenhall Town	Noose Lane

== See also ==
- Southern Football League
- 2005–06 Isthmian League
- 2005–06 Northern Premier League
