= Barking & East Ham United F.C. =

Barking & East Ham United
- Full name: Barking & East Ham United Football Club
- Founded: 2001
- Dissolved: 2006
- Ground: Mayesbrook Park, Dagenham
- Final season; 2005–06: Southern League Division One East, 5th of 22
Home colours

Barking & East Ham United FC was a football club that formed in 2001 after the merger of Barking and East Ham United. The club initially played in Division One of the Isthmian League, and then Division One North after league reorganisation in 2002. In 2004 they transferred to Division One East of the Southern League. In 2005–06 they finished fifth and qualified for the play-offs, but lost 3–2 to Stamford. The club was then transferred back to Division One North of the Isthmian League, but resigned from the league on 19 June and folded. One of the two clubs from which Barking & East Ham United were formed, Barking reformed for the 2006–07 season and currently play in the Essex Senior League.
