= 1999–2000 Brentford F.C. season =

English football team season

Brentford
1999–2000 season
- Chairman-manager: Ron Noades
- Stadium: Griffin Park
- Second Division: 17th
- FA Cup: First round
- League Cup: First round
- Football League Trophy: Semi-final
- Top goalscorer: League: Owusu (12); All: Owusu (14)
- Highest home attendance: 7,100
- Lowest home attendance: 2,942
- Average home league attendance: 5,742
Home colours	Away colours

During the 1999–2000 English football season, Brentford competed in the Football League Second Division. After returning to the Second Division as Third Division champions, a forgettable season ended in a 17th-place finish.

== Season summary ==
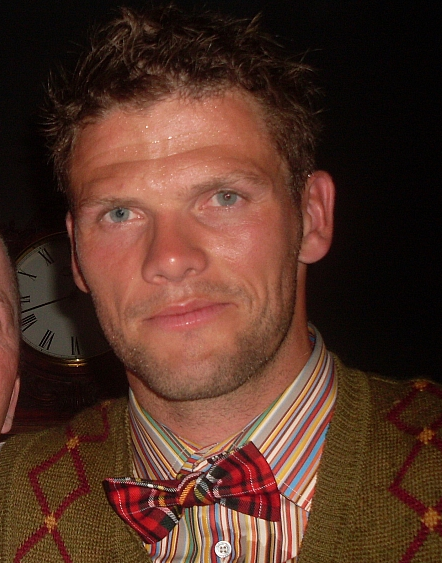
Hermann Hreiðarsson's £2,500,000 move to Wimbledon in October 1999 set a new club record which stood until 2014.

Brentford entered the 1999–2000 Second Division season with the bulk of the squad which finished the 1998–99 season as Third Division champions. Four fringe players were released and the trio of Darren Freeman, Charlie Oatway and Paul Watson were sold to Brighton & Hove Albion for a combined £30,000 fee. Just four players were brought in – three youngsters on free transfers (Richard Kennedy, Stephen Jenkins and David Theobald) and another youngster on a season-long loan, Southampton's Phil Warner.

The Bees enjoyed a 10-match unbeaten start to the season in the Second Division, hovering in the playoff places and setting a new club record of 26 league matches without a defeat, which stretched back into the previous season. The run came to an end with the team's first league defeat of the season at the hands of Gillingham on 19 October 1999. Days earlier, centre back Hermann Hreiðarsson had been sold for a club-record £2,500,000 fee to Wimbledon, which weakened the defence. The backline was shored up with two big-money signings, £250,000 Scott Marshall and £150,000 Ívar Ingimarsson.

The season began to drift away from Brentford in November 1999, with injuries causing a run of eight defeats in 10 games. The League Cup and FA Cup had been exited in the first rounds and the club were knocked out of the Football League Trophy at the semi-final stage in February 2000. £100,000 was spent on new forwards Julian Charles and Lorenzo Pinamonte either side of the Millennium, neither of whom made an impact. Brentford closed out the season with just one win in 17 matches in all competitions to finish in a disappointing 17th place.

One record was set during the season, that of the shortest Football League career with Brentford, when trainee Clement James made a substitute appearance of 8 minutes on his debut versus Stoke City on 8 April 2000.

== Final league table ==
Pos	Team	Pld	W	D	L	GF	GA	GD	Pts
15	Bury	46	13	18	15	61	64	−3	57
16	Bournemouth	46	16	9	21	59	62	−3	57
17	Brentford	46	13	13	20	47	61	−14	52
18	Colchester United	46	14	10	22	59	82	−23	52
19	Cambridge United	46	12	12	22	64	65	−1	48

Rules for classification: 1) Points; 2) Goal difference; 3) Goals scored

== Results ==
Brentford's goal tally listed first.

=== Legend ===
Win	Draw	Loss

=== Pre-season and friendlies ===
Date	Opponent	Venue	Result	Attendance	Scorer(s)
13 July 1999	Crawley Town	A	2–0	n/a	James, McEwan
17 July 1999	Sutton United	A	2–0	n/a	Bryan, McEwan
21 July 1999	Kingstonian	A	0–2	n/a	
25 July 1999	Dulwich Hamlet	A	1–0	n/a	Quinn
27 July 1999	Hampton & Richmond Borough	A	4–0	n/a	Quinn, Hreiðarsson, Owusu, Scott
31 July 1999	Portsmouth	H	0–1	2,019	
3 September 1999	Swindon Town	H	3–3	n/a	Partridge, Powell (2)

=== Football League Second Division ===
No.	Date	Opponent	Venue	Result	Attendance	Scorer(s)
1	7 August 1999	Bristol Rovers	A	0–0	8,514	
2	14 August 1999	Oldham Athletic	H	2–0	5,074	Bryan, Hreiðarsson
3	21 August 1999	Bury	A	2–2	3,491	Partridge, Rowlands
4	28 August 1999	Blackpool	H	2–0	5,353	Hreiðarsson, Evans
5	11 September 1999	Cambridge United	A	2–2	4,234	Scott, Evans
6	18 September 1999	Luton Town	H	2–0	7,039	Powell, Partridge
7	25 September 1999	Preston North End	H	2–2	7,100	Partridge, Evans
8	28 September 1999	Cardiff City	H	2–1	5,247	Scott, Owusu
9	2 October 1999	Burnley	A	2–2	10,907	Partridge, Evans
10	16 October 1999	Oxford United	H	2–0	6,237	Owusu, Powell
11	19 October 1999	Gillingham	H	1–2	6,264	Owusu
12	23 October 1999	Preston North End	A	1–2	10,382	Mahon
13	26 October 1999	Notts County	A	1–0	5,075	Evans
14	2 November 1999	Reading	H	1–1	6,774	Folan
15	6 November 1999	Wrexham	A	1–0	2,473	Marshall
16	12 November 1999	Scunthorpe United	H	4–3	4,657	Partridge, Owusu (2), Mahon
17	19 November 1999	Colchester United	A	3–0	3,464	Partridge, Owusu, Rowlands
18	23 November 1999	Bournemouth	A	1–4	4,202	Owusu
19	27 November 1999	Wycombe Wanderers	A	0–2	5,879	
20	4 December 1999	Bristol Rovers	H	0–3	6,843	
21	10 December 1999	Chesterfield	H	1–1	4,286	Owusu
22	18 December 1999	Wigan Athletic	A	0–1	5,498	
23	26 December 1999	Bristol City	H	2–1	6,942	Owusu, Rowlands
24	28 December 1999	Millwall	A	2–3	12,077	Mahon, Rowlands
25	3 January 2000	Stoke City	H	0–1	6,792	
26	8 January 2000	Chesterfield	A	0–1	2,746	
27	15 January 2000	Oldham Athletic	A	0–3	4,967	
28	22 January 2000	Bury	H	2–1	5,605	Scott, Rowlands
29	29 January 2000	Blackpool	A	1–0	5,270	Ingimarsson
30	5 February 2000	Notts County	H	0–2	5,106	
31	12 February 2000	Cardiff City	A	1–1	5,478	Rowlands
32	19 February 2000	Wycombe Wanderers	H	0–0	5,981	
33	26 February 2000	Luton Town	A	2–1	6,029	Owusu, Evans
34	4 March 2000	Cambridge United	H	1–1	4,987	Evans (pen)
35	7 March 2000	Wrexham	H	0–2	4,055	
36	11 March 2000	Reading	A	0–1	11,427	
37	18 March 2000	Bournemouth	H	0–2	4,578	
38	21 March 2000	Scunthorpe United	A	0–0	2,686	
39	25 March 2000	Bristol City	A	0–1	8,804	
40	1 April 2000	Wigan Athletic	H	0–2	4,479	
41	8 April 2000	Stoke City	A	0–1	9,955	
42	15 April 2000	Millwall	H	1–3	6,779	Pinamonte
43	22 April 2000	Oxford United	A	1–1	5,342	Owusu
44	24 April 2000	Burnley	H	2–3	6,595	Owusu, Marshall
45	29 April 2000	Gillingham	A	0–2	9,001	
46	6 May 2000	Colchester United	H	0–0	5,297	

=== FA Cup ===
Round	Date	Opponent	Venue	Result	Attendance	Scorer(s)
R1	30 October 1999	Plymouth Argyle	H	2–2	4,287	Owusu, Marshall
R1 (replay)	9 November 1999	Plymouth Argyle	A	1–2	5,409	Quinn

=== League Cup ===
Round	Date	Opponent	Venue	Result	Attendance
R1 (1st leg)	11 August 1999	Ipswich Town	H	0–2	4,825
R1 (2nd leg)	24 August 1999	Ipswich Town	A	0–2 (lost 4–0 on aggregate)	9,748

=== Football League Trophy ===
Round	Date	Opponent	Venue	Result	Attendance	Scorer(s)
SR2	11 January 2000	Peterborough United	A	1–0	2,430	Owusu
SQF	25 January 2000	Oxford United	H	2–0	2,942	Bryan, Scott
SSF	15 February 2000	Exeter City	A	2–3	2,392	Powell, Evans

- Sources: Soccerbase, 11v11, The Big Brentford Book of the Nineties

== Playing squad ==
Players' ages are as of the opening day of the 1999–2000 season.

No	Position	Name	Nationality	Date of birth (age)	Signed from	Signed in	Notes
Goalkeepers
1	GK	Andy Woodman	(England)	11 August 1971 (aged 27)	Northampton Town	1999	Loaned to Peterborough United
13	GK	Jason Pearcey	(England)	23 July 1971 (aged 28)	Grimsby Town	1998	
32	GK	Jimmy Glass	(England)	1 August 1973 (aged 26)	Cambridge United	2000	
Defenders
2	DF	Danny Boxall	(Republic of Ireland)	24 August 1977 (aged 21)	Crystal Palace	1998	
3	DF	Ijah Anderson	(England)	30 December 1975 (aged 23)	Southend United	1995	
4	DF	Rob Quinn	(Republic of Ireland)	8 November 1976 (aged 22)	Crystal Palace	1998	
5	DF	Darren Powell	(England)	10 March 1976 (aged 23)	Hampton	1998	
6	DF	Scott Marshall	(Scotland)	1 May 1973 (aged 26)	Southampton	1999	Loaned from Southampton before transferring permanently
16	DF	Ívar Ingimarsson	(Iceland)	20 August 1977 (aged 21)	ÍBV	1999	
18	DF	David Theobald	(England)	15 December 1978 (aged 20)	Ipswich Town	1999	
19	DF	Stephen Jenkins	(England)	2 January 1980 (aged 19)	Southampton	1999	
25	DF	Michael Dobson	(England)	9 April 1981 (aged 18)	Youth	1999	
27	DF	Nevin Saroya	(England)	15 September 1980 (aged 18)	Youth	2000	
Midfielders
7	MF	Paul Evans (c)	(Wales)	1 September 1974 (aged 24)	Shrewsbury Town	1999	
8	MF	Gavin Mahon	(England)	2 January 1977 (aged 22)	Hereford United	1998	
12	MF	Martin Rowlands	(Republic of Ireland)	8 February 1979 (aged 20)	Farnborough Town	1998	
14	MF	Tony Folan	(Republic of Ireland)	18 September 1978 (aged 20)	Crystal Palace	1998	
20	MF	Gareth Graham	(Northern Ireland)	6 February 1978 (aged 21)	Crystal Palace	1999	
23	MF	Tony Taggart	(England)	7 October 1981 (aged 17)	Youth	1999	
24	MF	Richard Kennedy	(Republic of Ireland)	28 August 1978 (aged 20)	Crystal Palace	1999	
33	MF	Jay Smith	(England)	29 December 1981 (aged 17)	Youth	1999	
Forwards
9	FW	Lloyd Owusu	(Ghana)	12 November 1976 (aged 22)	Slough Town	1998	
10	FW	Scott Partridge	(England)	13 October 1974 (aged 24)	Torquay United	1999	
11	FW	Andy Scott	(England)	2 August 1972 (aged 27)	Sheffield United	1997	
17	FW	Derek Bryan	(England)	11 November 1974 (aged 24)	Hampton	1997	
26	FW	Clement James	(England)	10 March 1981 (aged 18)	Youth	1999	
28	FW	Julian Charles	(Saint Vincent and the Grenadines)	5 February 1977 (aged 22)	Hampton & Richmond Borough	1999	Loaned to Woking
29	FW	Lorenzo Pinamonte	(Italy)	9 May 1978 (aged 21)	Bristol City	2000	
30	FW	Kevin O'Connor	(Republic of Ireland)	24 February 1982 (aged 17)	Youth	2000	
Players who left the club mid-season
~~6~~	DF	Hermann Hreiðarsson	(Iceland)	11 July 1974 (aged 25)	Crystal Palace	1998	Transferred to Wimbledon
15	DF	Phil Warner	(England)	2 February 1979 (aged 20)	Southampton	1999	Returned to Southampton after loan
~~16~~	DF	Danny Cullip	(England)	17 September 1976 (aged 22)	Fulham	1998	Loaned to Brighton & Hove Albion; Transferred to Brighton & Hove Albion
~~21~~	FW	Patrick Agyemang	(Ghana)	29 September 1980 (aged 18)	Wimbledon	1999	Returned to Wimbledon after loan
21	FW	Steve Jones	(England)	17 March 1970 (aged 29)	Bristol City	2000	Returned to Bristol City after loan
~~22~~	DF	Neil Clement	(England)	3 October 1978 (aged 20)	Chelsea	1999	Returned to Chelsea after loan
22	DF	Gunnar Einarsson	(Iceland)	7 July 1976 (aged 23)	Roda JC Kerkrade	2000	Returned to Roda JC Kerkrade after loan
~~23~~	MF	Dean Clark	(England)	31 March 1980 (aged 19)	Youth	1997	Loaned to Crawley Town and Uxbridge; Released
31	MF	Carl Hutchings	(England)	24 September 1974 (aged 24)	Bristol City	2000	Returned to Bristol City after loan

- Source: Soccerbase

== Coaching staff ==
Name	Role
(England) Ron Noades	Manager
(England) Ray Lewington	First-team coach
(England) Terry Bullivant	Assistant coach
(England) Brian Sparrow	Assistant coach
(England) John Griffin	Chief scout
(England) Gerry Delahunt	Physiotherapist
(England) Colin Martin	Medical Officer

== Statistics ==
=== Appearances and goals ===
Substitute appearances in brackets.

No	Pos	Nat	Name	League		FA Cup		League Cup		FL Trophy		Total	
No	Pos	Nat	Name	Apps	Goals	Apps	Goals	Apps	Goals	Apps	Goals	Apps	Goals
1	GK	(England)	Andy Woodman	39	0	2	0	1	0	3	0	45	0
2	DF	(Republic of Ireland)	Danny Boxall	25	0	2	0	2	0	3	0	32	0
3	DF	(England)	Ijah Anderson	30 (1)	0	0	0	2	0	2	0	34 (1)	0
4	DF	(Republic of Ireland)	Rob Quinn	42 (2)	0	2	1	1 (1)	0	3	0	48 (3)	1
5	DF	(England)	Darren Powell	36	2	2	0	2	0	3	1	43	3
~~6~~	DF	(Iceland)	Hermann Hreiðarsson	8	2	—		2	0	—		10	2
6	DF	(Scotland)	Scott Marshall	22	2	2	1	—		0	0	24	3
7	MF	(Wales)	Paul Evans	33	7	1	0	2	0	2	1	38	8
8	MF	(England)	Gavin Mahon	37	3	2	0	2	0	3	0	44	3
9	FW	(Ghana)	Lloyd Owusu	39 (2)	12	2	1	1	0	1 (1)	1	43 (3)	14
10	FW	(England)	Scott Partridge	38 (3)	6	1 (1)	0	2	0	1 (1)	0	42 (5)	6
11	FW	(England)	Andy Scott	32 (4)	3	2	0	1 (1)	0	2	1	37 (5)	4
12	MF	(Republic of Ireland)	Martin Rowlands	38 (2)	6	1 (1)	0	1 (1)	0	3	0	43 (4)	6
13	GK	(England)	Jason Pearcey	6	0	0	0	1	0	0	0	7	0
14	MF	(Republic of Ireland)	Tony Folan	1 (8)	1	0 (1)	0	1 (1)	0	0	0	2 (10)	1
16	DF	(Iceland)	Ívar Ingimarsson	21 (4)	1	—		—		3	0	24 (4)	1
17	FW	(England)	Derek Bryan	5 (13)	1	0 (1)	0	1 (1)	0	0 (1)	1	6 (16)	2
18	DF	(England)	David Theobald	6 (4)	0	0	0	0	0	1	0	7 (4)	0
19	DF	(England)	Stephen Jenkins	2 (3)	0	1	0	0	0	0	0	3 (3)	0
20	MF	(Northern Ireland)	Gareth Graham	5 (8)	0	0	0	—		0	0	5 (8)	0
24	MF	(Republic of Ireland)	Richard Kennedy	4 (5)	0	0	0	0	0	1	0	5 (5)	0
26	FW	(England)	Clement James	0 (1)	0	0	0	0	0	0	0	0 (1)	0
27	DF	(England)	Nevin Saroya	0 (1)	0	0	0	0	0	0	0	0 (1)	0
28	FW	(Saint Vincent and the Grenadines)	Julian Charles	0 (2)	0	—		—		0	0	0 (2)	0
29	FW	(Italy)	Lorenzo Pinamonte	5 (10)	1	—		—		0 (1)	0	5 (11)	1
30	FW	(Republic of Ireland)	Kevin O'Connor	6	0	0	0	0	0	0 (1)	0	6 (1)	0
32	GK	(England)	Jimmy Glass	1 (1)	0	—		—		—		1 (1)	0
	Players loaned in during the season												
15	DF	(England)	Phil Warner	1 (13)	0	1	0	0 (1)	0	0	0	2 (14)	0
~~21~~	FW	(Ghana)	Patrick Agyemang	3 (9)	0	1	0	—		—		4 (9)	0
21	FW	(England)	Steve Jones	6 (2)	0	—		—		2	0	8 (2)	0
~~22~~	DF	(England)	Neil Clement	7 (1)	0	—		—		—		7 (1)	0
22	DF	(Iceland)	Gunnar Einarsson	1 (2)	0	—		—		0 (1)	0	1 (3)	0
31	MF	(England)	Carl Hutchings	7 (1)	0	—		—		—		7 (1)	0

- Players listed in italics left the club mid-season.
- Source: Soccerbase

=== Goalscorers ===
No	Pos	Nat	Player	FL2	FAC	FLC	FLT	Total
9	FW	(Ghana)	Lloyd Owusu	12	1	0	1	14
7	MF	(Wales)	Paul Evans	7	0	0	1	8
10	FW	(England)	Scott Partridge	6	0	0	0	6
12	MF	(Republic of Ireland)	Martin Rowlands	6	0	0	0	6
11	FW	(England)	Andy Scott	3	0	0	1	4
8	MF	(England)	Gavin Mahon	3	0	0	0	3
6	DF	(Scotland)	Scott Marshall	2	1	—	0	3
5	DF	(England)	Darren Powell	2	0	0	1	3
~~6~~	DF	(Iceland)	Hermann Hreiðarsson	2	—	0	—	2
17	FW	(England)	Derek Bryan	1	0	0	1	2
16	DF	(Iceland)	Ívar Ingimarsson	1	—	—	0	1
29	FW	(Italy)	Lorenzo Pinamonte	1	—	—	0	1
14	MF	(Republic of Ireland)	Tony Folan	1	0	0	0	1
4	DF	(Republic of Ireland)	Rob Quinn	0	1	0	0	1
Total				47	3	0	5	55

- Players listed in italics left the club mid-season.
- Source: Soccerbase

=== Discipline ===
No	Pos	Nat	Player	FL1		FAC		FLC		FLT		Total		Pts
No	Pos	Nat	Player	Booked	Sent off (straight red)	Booked	Sent off (straight red)	Booked	Sent off (straight red)	Booked	Sent off (straight red)	Booked	Sent off (straight red)	Pts
7	MF	(Wales)	Paul Evans	10	1	0	0	0	0	0	0	10	1	13
4	DF	(Republic of Ireland)	Rob Quinn	8	0	0	0	0	0	0	0	8	0	8
12	MF	(Republic of Ireland)	Martin Rowlands	6	0	1	0	0	0	0	0	7	0	7
5	DF	(England)	Darren Powell	4	0	1	0	1	0	0	0	6	0	6
24	MF	(Republic of Ireland)	Richard Kennedy	2	1	0	0	0	0	1	0	3	1	6
3	DF	(England)	Ijah Anderson	4	0	0	0	0	0	1	0	5	0	5
~~6~~	DF	(Iceland)	Hermann Hreiðarsson	1	1	—		0		—		1	1	4
1	GK	(England)	Andy Woodman	1	1	0	0	0	0	0	0	1	1	4
11	FW	(England)	Andy Scott	3	0	0	0	0	0	0	0	3	0	3
6	DF	(Scotland)	Scott Marshall	2	0	0	0	—	0	0	0	2	0	2
19	DF	(England)	Stephen Jenkins	2	0	0	0	0	0	0	0	2	0	2
8	MF	(England)	Gavin Mahon	2	0	0	0	0	0	0	0	2	0	2
10	FW	(England)	Scott Partridge	2	0	0	0	0	0	0	0	2	0	2
2	DF	(Republic of Ireland)	Danny Boxall	1	0	1	0	0	0	0	0	2	0	2
9	FW	(Ghana)	Lloyd Owusu	1	0	1	0	0	0	0	0	2	0	2
~~22~~	DF	(England)	Neil Clement	1	0	—		—		—		1	0	1
~~21~~	FW	(Ghana)	Patrick Agyemang	1	0	0	0	—		—		1	0	1
16	DF	(Iceland)	Ívar Ingimarsson	1	0	—		—		0	0	1	0	1
18	DF	(England)	David Theobald	1	0	0	0	0	0	0	0	1	0	1
17	FW	(England)	Derek Bryan	0	0	1	0	0	0	0	0	1	0	1
Total				53	4	5	0	1	0	2	0	61	4	73

- Players listed in italics left the club mid-season.
- Source: Soccerbase

=== International caps ===
No	Pos	Nat	Player	Caps	Goals	Ref
~~6~~	DF	(Iceland)	Hermann Hreiðarsson	4	1	

- Players listed in italics left the club mid-season.

=== Management ===
Name	Nat	From	To	Record All Comps					Record League				
Name	Nat	From	To	P	W	D	L	W %	P	W	D	L	W %
Ron Noades	(England)	7 August 1999	6 May 2000	53	15	14	24	28.30|	46	13	13	20	28.26

=== Summary ===
Games played	56 (46 Second Division, 2 FA Cup, 2 League Cup, 3 Football League Trophy)
Games won	15 (13 Second Division, 0 FA Cup, 0 League Cup, 2 Football League Trophy)
Games drawn	14 (13 Second Division, 1 FA Cup, 0 League Cup, 0 Football League Trophy)
Games lost	24 (20 Second Division, 1 FA Cup, 2 League Cup, 1 Football League Trophy)
Goals scored	55 (47 Second Division, 3 FA Cup, 0 League Cup, 5 Football League Trophy)
Goals conceded	72 (61 Second Division, 4 FA Cup, 4 League Cup, 3 Football League Trophy)
Clean sheets	14 (12 Second Division, 0 FA Cup, 0 League Cup, 2 Football League Trophy)
Biggest league win	3–0 versus Colchester United, 19 November 1999
Worst league defeat	3–0 on two occasions, 4–1 versus Bournemouth, 23 November 1999
Most appearances	51, Rob Quinn (44 Second Division, 2 FA Cup, 2 League Cup, 3 Football League Trophy)
Top scorer (league)	12, Lloyd Owusu
Top scorer (all competitions)	14, Lloyd Owusu

== Transfers & loans ==
Players transferred in
Date	Pos.	Name	Previous club	Fee	Ref.
8 July 1999	DF	(England) David Theobald	(England) Ipswich Town	Free	
13 July 1999	DF	(England) Stephen Jenkins	(England) Southampton	Free	
14 July 1999	MF	(Republic of Ireland) Richard Kennedy	(England) Crystal Palace	Free	
7 October 1999	MF	(Northern Ireland) Gareth Graham	(England) Crystal Palace	Free	
29 October 1999	DF	(Scotland) Scott Marshall	(England) Southampton	£250,000	
18 November 1999	DF	(Iceland) Ívar Ingimarsson	(Iceland) ÍBV	£150,000	
26 December 1999	FW	(Saint Vincent and the Grenadines) Julian Charles	(England) Hampton & Richmond Borough	£25,000	
4 February 2000	FW	(Italy) Lorenzo Pinamonte	(England) Bristol City	£75,000	
23 March 2000	GK	(England) Jimmy Glass	(England) Cambridge United	Non-contract	
Players loaned in
Date from	Pos.	Name	From	Date to	Ref.
2 July 1999	DF	(England) Phil Warner	(England) Southampton	March 2000	
28 September 1999	MF	(Northern Ireland) Gareth Graham	(England) Crystal Palace	7 October 1999	
10 October 1999	FW	(Ghana) Patrick Agyemang	(England) Wimbledon	18 January 2000	
15 October 1999	DF	(Scotland) Scott Marshall	(England) Southampton	26 October 1999	
23 November 1999	DF	(England) Neil Clement	(England) Chelsea	12 January 2000	
20 January 2000	DF	(Iceland) Gunnar Einarsson	(Netherlands) Roda JC Kerkrade	20 April 2000	
21 January 2000	FW	(England) Steve Jones	(England) Bristol City	14 March 2000	
11 February 2000	MF	(England) Carl Hutchings	(England) Bristol City	11 April 2000	
Players transferred out
Date	Pos.	Name	Subsequent club	Fee	Ref.
8 July 1999	FW	(England) Darren Freeman	(England) Brighton & Hove Albion	Free	
9 July 1999	MF	(England) Charlie Oatway	(England) Brighton & Hove Albion	£10,000	
9 July 1999	DF	(England) Paul Watson	(England) Brighton & Hove Albion	£20,000	
13 October 1999	DF	(England) Danny Cullip	(England) Brighton & Hove Albion	£50,000	
14 October 1999	DF	(Iceland) Hermann Hreiðarsson	(England) Wimbledon	£2,500,000	
Players loaned out
Date from	Pos.	Name	To	Date to	Ref.
August 1999	MF	(England) Dean Clark	(England) Crawley Town	October 1999	
23 August 1999	DF	(England) Leon Townley	(England) Slough Town	20 September 1999	
17 September 1999	DF	(England) Danny Cullip	(England) Brighton & Hove Albion	12 October 1999	
January 2000	MF	(England) Dean Clark	(England) Uxbridge	n/a	
3 March 2000	FW	(Saint Vincent and the Grenadines) Julian Charles	(England) Woking	End of season	
23 March 2000	GK	(England) Andy Woodman	(England) Peterborough United	6 April 2000	
Players released
Date	Pos.	Name	Subsequent club	Join date	Ref.
20 September 1999	DF	(England) Leon Townley	(England) Slough Town	20 September 1999	
April 2000	MF	(England) Dean Clark	(England) Uxbridge	2000	
May 2000	GK	(England) Jimmy Glass	(England) Oxford United	8 August 2000	
May 2000	FW	(England) Clement James	(England) Slough Town	28 September 2000	
May 2000	DF	(England) Stephen Jenkins	(England) Forest Green Rovers	2001	

== Kit ==
Supplier: Super League
Sponsor(s): GMB

Home	Away

Source: Brentford F.C.

== Awards ==
- Supporters' Player of the Year: Martin Rowlands
