= 2001–02 Football Conference =

Football Conference
- Season: 2001–02
- Champions: Boston United (1st Football Conference title)
- Direct promotion: Boston United
- Conference League Cup winners: Competition not held
- FA Trophy winners: Yeovil Town (1st FA Trophy title)
- Relegated to Level 6: Dover Athletic, Hayes, Stalybridge Celtic
- Matches: 462
- Goals: 1,289 (2.79 per match)
- Top goalscorer: Daryl Clare (Boston United), 24; Mark Stein (Dagenham & Redbridge), 24
- Biggest home win: Margate – Stalybridge Celtic 8–0 (27 April 2002)
- Biggest away win: Dagenham & Redbridge – Telford 1–5 (22 December 2001); Hayes – Doncaster 1–5 (15 September 2001); Morecambe – Yeovil 1–5 (9 February 2002); Hayes – Yeovil 0–4 (26 January 2002); Stalybridge Celtic – Chester 0–4 (9 March 2002)
- Highest scoring: Margate – Stalybridge Celtic 8–0 (27 April 2002)
- Longest winning run: ?
- Longest unbeaten run: ?
- Longest losing run: ?
- Highest attendance: Yeovil Town v Boston United, 5,061 (26 March 2002)
- Lowest attendance: ?
- Average attendance: 1,370 (– 12% compared with the previous season)

The 2001–02 Football Conference season was the twenty-third season of the Football Conference, also known as the Nationwide Conference for sponsorship reasons.

== Changes since the previous season ==
- Barnet (relegated from the Football League 2000–01)
- Farnborough Town (promoted 2000–01)
- Margate (promoted 2000–01)
- Stalybridge Celtic (promoted 2000–01)

== Overview ==
The manager of Boston United, Steve Evans, and former chairman, Pat Malkinson, were charged with breaking the Football Association's rules over the registration of players. Both men received bans from the FA, and the club were fined and docked four points from their first season in the League. This angered some, especially the Conference runners up Dagenham & Redbridge, who believed that any points deduction should have applied to the previous season, which would have meant Dagenham being promoted instead.

== Locations ==
Locations of the Football Conference 2001–2002 teams

== Final league table ==
Pos	Team	Pld	W	D	L	GF	GA	GD	Pts	Promotion or relegation
1	Boston United (Note: Boston United were charged with breaking The Football Association's rules over the registration of players. The club was fined and deducted four points at the start of the following season.) (C, P)	42	25	9	8	84	42	+42	84	Promotion to the Football League Third Division
2	Dagenham & Redbridge	42	24	12	6	70	47	+23	84	
3	Yeovil Town	42	19	13	10	66	53	+13	70	
4	Doncaster Rovers	42	18	13	11	68	46	+22	67	
5	Barnet	42	19	10	13	64	48	+16	67	
6	Morecambe	42	17	11	14	63	67	−4	62	
7	Farnborough Town	42	18	7	17	66	54	+12	61	
8	Margate	42	14	16	12	59	53	+6	58	
9	Telford United	42	14	15	13	63	58	+5	57	
10	Nuneaton Borough	42	16	9	17	57	57	0	57	
11	Stevenage Borough	42	15	10	17	57	60	−3	55	
12	Scarborough	42	14	14	14	55	63	−8	55 (Note: Scarborough were deducted 1 point for breaching a rule.)	
13	Northwich Victoria	42	16	7	19	57	70	−13	55	
14	Chester City	42	15	9	18	54	51	+3	54	
15	Southport	42	13	14	15	53	49	+4	53	
16	Leigh RMI	42	15	8	19	56	58	−2	53	
17	Hereford United	42	14	10	18	50	53	−3	52	
18	Forest Green Rovers	42	12	15	15	54	76	−22	51	
19	Woking	42	13	9	20	59	70	−11	48	
20	Hayes (R)	42	13	5	24	53	80	−27	44	Relegation to the Isthmian League Premier Division
21	Stalybridge Celtic (R)	42	11	10	21	40	69	−29	43	Relegation to the Northern Premier League Premier Division
22	Dover Athletic (R)	42	11	6	25	41	65	−24	39	Relegation to the Southern League Premier Division

(C) Champions; (P) Promoted; (R) Relegated

== Results ==
Home \ Away	BAR	BOS	CHE	D&R	DON	DOV	FAR	FGR	HAY	HER	LEI	MAR	MOR	NOR	NUN	SCA	SOU	STL	STB	TEL	WOK	YEO
Barnet		0–1	3–1	4–0	2–0	2–0	0–3	0–1	3–1	2–0	1–1	4–1	1–0	1–0	0–1	1–1	0–0	1–2	0–3	0–0	3–0	2–3
Boston United	1–1		0–1	1–2	2–2	4–2	4–0	6–1	4–1	3–4	2–1	0–1	2–1	3–2	4–1	2–2	0–0	4–1	0–0	3–1	4–0	4–0
Chester City	1–0	1–2		0–1	1–1	3–0	1–0	2–3	3–1	2–0	1–1	0–3	1–1	1–2	1–0	0–0	0–2	0–0	5–1	2–2	0–2	1–1
Dagenham & Redbridge	1–1	1–0	3–0		1–0	1–0	2–1	1–1	1–1	1–0	0–1	4–1	3–2	1–1	2–0	4–2	1–1	2–1	1–0	1–5	3–1	1–1
Doncaster Rovers	2–3	0–1	2–0	0–0		2–1	1–1	5–1	5–2	4–0	2–0	1–0	3–3	2–2	2–2	4–3	1–0	0–1	2–0	1–0	1–1	1–2
Dover Athletic	2–2	3–2	1–0	0–1	0–1		2–1	1–2	3–2	0–1	0–0	0–0	1–1	2–1	1–2	0–2	0–1	1–0	0–1	0–1	2–2	1–2
Farnborough Town	2–1	0–2	1–1	1–2	0–1	1–0		3–0	1–2	4–2	3–0	0–0	2–1	4–1	2–1	4–2	0–1	2–0	6–1	1–1	0–1	1–3
Forest Green Rovers	2–2	0–3	0–2	2–4	0–2	2–1	1–0		2–1	1–1	1–2	3–3	3–1	2–0	1–2	2–2	2–1	0–2	0–0	1–1	2–1	1–1
Hayes	0–2	0–2	1–3	2–4	1–5	2–1	0–3	1–1		4–1	2–1	2–4	3–1	1–2	1–2	1–2	1–0	0–0	0–2	1–4	4–1	0–4
Hereford United	2–1	0–1	1–0	1–0	0–0	3–0	4–2	0–0	0–1		0–1	3–0	0–2	1–0	1–1	6–0	0–0	3–0	1–1	0–1	2–2	0–2
Leigh RMI	3–3	1–2	3–0	2–0	1–4	1–2	3–0	1–2	1–1	0–1		2–2	0–1	1–2	0–1	1–1	1–2	1–0	1–2	3–1	3–1	0–1
Margate	0–1	1–1	0–0	1–1	1–1	0–1	2–1	1–1	1–0	2–2	1–2		1–1	1–2	1–1	1–1	2–0	8–0	2–1	3–1	4–3	0–1
Morecambe	1–0	0–0	0–3	1–1	2–1	2–1	1–1	2–0	2–1	2–2	1–3	2–1		2–1	1–0	2–0	2–2	1–0	0–3	2–1	3–1	1–5
Northwich Victoria	0–3	1–2	3–1	1–2	2–3	2–1	1–2	2–2	1–0	1–0	0–3	1–1	4–3		3–0	1–1	3–1	1–0	2–1	2–2	0–3	1–3
Nuneaton Borough	2–3	1–1	1–3	2–0	2–3	3–0	1–1	2–1	0–2	2–0	2–1	0–0	2–3	0–1		1–2	3–0	3–1	2–1	1–2	2–0	1–2
Scarborough	3–0	2–0	2–1	0–0	1–0	1–1	1–0	1–1	1–2	3–2	2–5	0–1	0–2	1–2	1–2		2–0	1–1	1–1	3–1	1–0	0–0
Southport	0–1	2–3	3–2	2–2	1–0	0–2	2–5	5–1	2–3	1–1	5–0	1–2	1–1	5–1	1–1	1–0		3–1	0–0	0–0	2–0	3–0
Stalybridge Celtic	1–1	2–1	0–4	2–3	1–0	0–2	1–1	2–1	1–0	0–2	0–1	2–2	4–3	1–1	4–2	2–3	0–0		2–0	0–2	0–2	1–1
Stevenage Borough	3–2	1–2	2–1	1–3	0–0	1–3	1–2	4–1	1–1	3–1	0–1	3–1	3–1	1–0	2–2	2–0	2–1	2–0		1–1	1–4	2–3
Telford United	1–2	2–2	0–3	1–4	1–1	4–3	0–1	0–0	1–2	0–1	3–1	2–0	4–1	1–0	0–2	3–0	1–1	3–1	2–1		3–3	2–2
Woking	1–3	0–2	2–1	0–2	3–1	4–0	3–2	3–4	0–1	1–0	1–1	0–1	1–3	3–1	0–0	1–2	2–0	1–1	1–1	1–1		0–2
Yeovil Town	1–2	0–1	0–1	3–3	1–1	2–0	0–1	2–2	2–1	2–1	2–1	1–2	1–1	2–3	2–1	2–2	0–0	0–2	2–1	1–1	1–3	

Updated to match(es) played on unknown. Source: Glenda Rollin and Jack Rollin (eds.), Rothmans Football Yearbook 2002–2003. Headline, 2002
Legend: Blue = home team win; Yellow = draw; Red = away team win.

== Top scorers in order of league goals ==
Rank	Player	Club	League	FA Cup	FA Trophy	League Cup	LDV	Total
1	(Republic of Ireland) Daryl Clare	Boston United	24				0	
=	(England) Mark Stein	Dagenham & Redbridge	24				0	
3	(Saint Lucia) Ken Charlery	Dagenham & Redbridge	17				1	
=	(England) Mark Cooper	Forest Green Rovers	17				0	
5	(England) Mark Beesley	Chester City	16				0	
=	(England) Gregg Blundell	Northwich Victoria	16				0	
=	(England) Leon Braithwaite	Margate	16				0	
=	(England) Simon Parke	Southport	16				0	
9	(England) Lenny Piper	Farnborough Town	15				0	
=	(England) Robbie Talbot	Morecambe	15				0	
=	(England) Michael Twiss	Leigh RMI	15				0	
12	(Scotland) Jamie Paterson	Doncaster Rovers	14				0	
13	(England) Dean Clark	Hayes	13				0	
=	(England) Mark Quayle	Telford United	13				0	
=	(Tunisia) Dino Maamria	Leigh RMI	12				1	
=	(England) Ian Hodges	Hayes	12				0	
=	(England) Darryn Stamp	Scarborough	12				0	
=	(England) Joff Vansittart	Farnborough Town	12				0	
=	(England) Simon Weatherstone	Boston United	12				0	
20	(England) Warren Patmore	Woking	11				0	

- Footballtransfers.co.uk, thefootballarchives.com and Soccerbase contain information on many players
  on whom there is not yet an article in Wikipedia.
