= David Theobald =

English footballer (born 1978)

Personal information
- Full name: David John Theobald
- Date of birth: 15 December 1978 (age 47)
- Place of birth: Cambridge, England
- Height: 1.88 m (6 ft 2 in)
- Position: Defender

Team information
- Current team: Cambridge City (first team coach)

Youth career
- Cambridge United
- –1997: Ipswich Town

Senior career*
Years	Team	Apps	(Gls)
1997–1999	Ipswich Town	0	(0)
1999–2002	Brentford	31	(0)
2002–2003	Swansea City	10	(0)
2003	Cambridge United	4	(0)
2003	→ Cambridge City (loan)	1	(0)
2003–2005	Canvey Island	59	(4)
2004	→ Bishop's Stortford (loan)	5	(0)
2005–2006	Kettering Town	31	(5)
2006–2007	St Albans City	22	(3)
2007	Kettering Town	19	(0)
2007–2013	Cambridge City	219	(31)
2013–2015	Royston Town	20	(1)
2015–2016	Soham Town Rangers	16	(2)
2017–2019	Cambridge City	1	(0)

Managerial career
- 2015–2016: Soham Town Rangers (joint-manager)
- 2016: Soham Town Rangers
- * Club domestic league appearances and goals

David John Theobald (born 15 December 1978) is an English retired semi-professional footballer who played as a defender in the Football League for Brentford, Swansea City and Cambridge United. He played the majority of his career in non-League football, predominantly for Cambridge City, for whom he made over 270 appearances across three spells. He is currently first team coach at Cambridge City.

== Playing career ==
=== Early years ===
Theobald began his career in the youth system at Cambridge United, before joining the youth setup at Ipswich Town. He progressed to undertake a scholarship, but did not win a call into a first team squad before his release at the end of the 1998–99 season.

=== Brentford ===
On 8 July 1999, Theobald signed a three-year contract with newly promoted Second Division club Brentford on a free transfer. He was utilised as cover for injuries and had a run in the team as a stand-in right back for the injured Danny Boxall during the 1999–00 season and in central defence for Scott Marshall during 2000–01. Theobald was named in the starting lineup for the 2001 Football League Trophy Final and received a runners-up medal. He was released after Brentford's defeat in the 2002 Second Division play-off final and made just 37 appearances during three seasons at Griffin Park.

=== Swansea City ===
On 26 July 2002, Theobald signed a one-year contract with Third Division club Swansea City on a free transfer. He made just 12 appearances before leaving the Vetch Field in February 2003.

=== Cambridge United ===
On 7 February 2003, Theobald joined hometown Third Division club Cambridge United on a contract running until the end of the 2002–03 season. He made just one appearance before his contract expired.

=== Non-League football ===
Between 2003 and 2018, Theobald had a long career in non-League football, predominantly with Cambridge City, for whom he made 274 appearances and scored 39 goals across three spells. He also played for Canvey Island, Kettering Town, St Albans City, Royston Town, Soham Town Rangers and Bishop's Stortford.

== Managerial and coaching career ==
=== Soham Town Rangers ===
On 8 October 2015, Theobald and fellow senior player Robbie Nightingale took over as joint-managers of Isthmian League First Division North club Soham Town Rangers. He remained in the role until 4 December 2016, when he followed Nightingale out of the club.

=== Cambridge City ===
On 5 December 2016, Theobald returned to Southern League Premier Division club Cambridge City as first team coach.

== Personal life ==
Theobald attended Impington Village College. He is a Liverpool and Cambridge United supporter.

== Career statistics ==
Appearances and goals by club, season and competition
Club	Season	League			FA Cup		League Cup		Other		Total	
Club	Season	Division	Apps	Goals	Apps	Goals	Apps	Goals	Apps	Goals	Apps	Goals
Brentford	1999–00	Second Division	10	0	0	0	0	0	1 (Note: Appearance(s) in Football League Trophy)	0	11	0
Brentford	2000–01	Second Division	15	0	0	0	0	0	4	0	19	0
Brentford	2001–02	Second Division	6	0	0	0	0	0	1	0	7	0
Brentford	Total		31	0	0	0	0	0	6	0	37	0
Swansea City	2002–03	Third Division	10	0	1	0	0	0	1	0	12	0
Cambridge United	2002–03	Third Division	4	0	—		—		—		4	0
Cambridge City (loan)	2002–03	Southern League Premier Division	1	0	—		—		—		1	0
Canvey Island	2003–04	Isthmian League Premier Division	40	3	2	0	—		0	0	42	3
Canvey Island	2004–05	Conference Premier	16	1	0	0	—		0	0	16	1
Canvey Island	2005–06	Conference Premier	3	0	—		—		—		3	0
Canvey Island	Total		59	4	2	0	—		0	0	61	4
Bishop's Stortford (loan)	2004–05	Conference South	5	0	—		—		—		5	0
Kettering Town	2005–06	Conference North	31	5	1	0	—		0	0	32	5
St Albans City	2006–07	Conference Premier	22	3	1	0	—		2 (Note: One appearance in FA Trophy; one appearance in Herts Senior Cup)	0	25	3
Kettering Town	2006–07	Conference North	19	0	—		—		2 (Note: Appearances in Conference North play-offs)	0	21	0
Cambridge City	2007–08	Conference South	29	4	0	0	—		5 (Note: Three appearances in FA Trophy; two appearances in Cambridgeshire Invitation Cup)	0	34	4
Cambridge City	2008–09	Southern League Premier Division	34	6	3	1	—		8 (Note: Four appearances in FA Trophy; two appearances in Southern League Cup; two appearances in Cambridgeshire Invitation Cup)	0	45	7
Cambridge City	2009–10	Southern League Premier Division	35	5	2	0	—		9 (Note: Seven appearances, two goals in Southern League Cup; one appearance in FA Trophy; one appearance in Cambridgeshire Invitation Cup)	2	46	7
Cambridge City	2010–11	Southern League Premier Division	37	5	4	1	—		8 (Note: Three appearances in FA Trophy; three appearances in Southern League Cup; one appearance in Southern League Premier Division play-offs; one appearance in Southern League Championship)	0	49	6
Cambridge City	2011–12	Southern League Premier Division	43	9	2	1	—		2 (Note: Appearances in FA Trophy)	0	47	10
Cambridge City	2012–13	Southern League Premier Division	41	2	7	3	—		3 (Note: Two appearances in Cambridgeshire Invitation Cup; one appearance in FA Trophy)	0	51	5
Cambridge City	Total		219	31	18	6	—		35	2	272	39
Royston Town	2013–14	Southern League First Division Central	1	0	0	0	—		0	0	1	0
Royston Town	2014–15	Southern League First Division Central	19	1	1	0	—		4 (Note: One appearance in Herts Senior Cup; one appearance in Herts Charity Cup)	0	24	1
Royston Town	Total		20	1	1	0	—		4	0	25	1
Soham Town Rangers	2015–16	Isthmian League First Division North	16	2	1	0	—		2 (Note: One appearance in FA Trophy; one appearance in Isthmian League Cup)	0	19	2
Cambridge City	2017–18	Southern League First Division East	1	0	0	0	—		0	0	1	0
Cambridge City	2018–19	Southern League First Division Central	2	0	0	0	—		0	0	2	0
Cambridge City	Total		3	0	0	0	—		0	0	3	0
Career total			439	46	25	6	0	0	50	2	514	54

== Honours ==
Brentford

- Football League Trophy runner-up: 2000–01

Canvey Island

- Isthmian League Premier Division: 2003–04

Cambridge City

- Southern League Cup: 2009–10
