= 1998–99 Southampton F.C. season =

Southampton F.C.
1998–99 season
- Chairman: Rupert Lowe
- Manager: Dave Jones
- Stadium: The Dell
- FA Premier League: 17th
- FA Cup: Third round
- League Cup: Second round
- Top goalscorer: League: Matt Le Tissier (7); Egil Østenstad (7); All: Egil Østenstad (8)
- Highest home attendance: 15,255 v Arsenal (3 April 1999)
- Lowest home attendance: 11,645 v Fulham (23 September 1998)
- Average home league attendance: 15,140
- Biggest win: 3–0 v Leeds United (30 January 1999)
- Biggest defeat: 1–7 v Liverpool (16 January 1999)
Home colours	Away colours	Third colours

The 1998–99 Southampton F.C. season was the club's 98th season of competitive football, their 29th (and 21st consecutive) in the top flight of English football, and their seventh in the FA Premier League. After a decent first season with Dave Jones in charge which saw the club finish 12th in the league table, the Saints had a disappointing second campaign with their new manager as they avoided relegation by just five points, finishing one place above the drop zone. The team's form outside the league was similarly poor, as they were eliminated at the first hurdle of both the FA Cup and the League Cup.

After losing striker Kevin Davies in a club record £7.5 million deal in the summer, Jones signed two replacements – James Beattie and Mark Hughes – as well as bringing in experienced winger Stuart Ripley. Squad changes continued throughout the season, with the likes of Hassan Kachloul, Chris Marsden and Marians Pahars taking the places of players including Kevin Richardson, Stig Johansen and Carlton Palmer. The Saints spent almost all of the season in the relegation places of the FA Premier League table, thanks in part to a dreadful start in which they picked up just one point in their opening eight games. After picking up just eight wins all season, they saved their top-flight status with three crucial consecutive victories in their final three games.

Outside the league, Southampton's performance was equally woeful. In both the FA Cup and the League Cup, they were drawn in their opening round against Fulham, who had recently won promotion to the Second Division. In the League Cup, the FA Premier League side were held to a 1–1 draw in the opening second round first leg tie, before suffering a 0–1 defeat at home after playing most of the game a man down due to dismissal. The story was almost identical in the FA Cup, as the ten-man top-flight side scraped through a third round home tie 1–1 with a late goal, before being eliminated by a 1–0 Fulham victory in the replay. This marked the first time Southampton had been eliminated at the first hurdle of both competitions since the 1993–94 season.

Southampton used 31 players during the 1998–99 season and had 13 different goalscorers. Norwegian striker Egil Østenstad finished as the club's top goalscorer for the first time, scoring just eight goals in all competitions (including seven in the league) – the lowest of any Saints top scorer since they started playing league football. Beattie, in his debut season at the club, made the most appearances for the team (39), finished third on goals (6) just behind second-placed Matt Le Tissier (7), and won the Southampton F.C. Player of the Season award at the end of the year. The average league attendance at The Dell in 1998–99 was 15,140. The highest attendance was 5,255 against Arsenal in April and the lowest was 11,645 against Fulham in the League Cup in September.

== Background and transfers ==
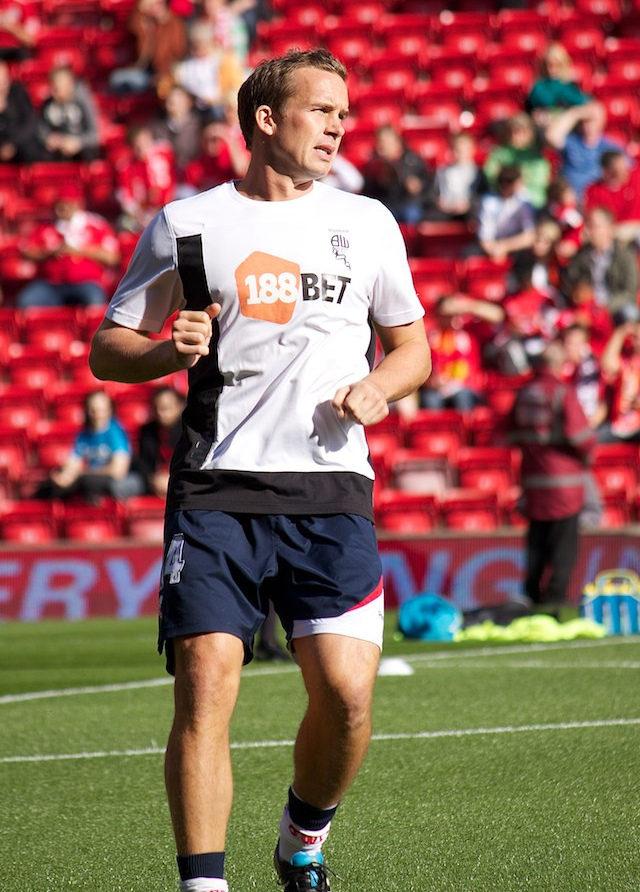
Kevin Davies left Southampton in the summer of 1998 after just one season, moving for a club record fee of £7.5 million to Blackburn Rovers.

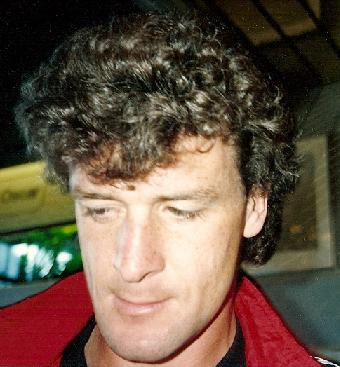
Former Manchester United, Barcelona and Chelsea striker Mark Hughes was brought in to help replace Davies up front.

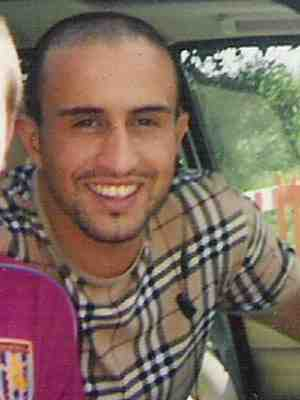
Moroccan midfielder Hassan Kachloul was signed in October for £250,000, staying with the club for three seasons.

At the beginning of the summer, Southampton sold striker Kevin Davies for a club record fee of £7.5 million to Blackburn Rovers – ten times the amount they had paid for him just over a year earlier. In order to try and replace him up front, they signed James Beattie in return for £1 million, as well as adding experienced striker Mark Hughes for £650,000 from Chelsea. Other arrivals in the summer included another Blackburn purchase, £1.5 million winger Stuart Ripley, as well as free signings David Howells from Tottenham Hotspur, Scott Marshall from Arsenal, and Mark Paul from King's Lynn. Leaving the club during pre-season were full-back Lee Todd (£250,000 to Bradford City), midfielder Kevin Richardson (£75,000 to Barnsley), and winger Duncan Spedding (£75,000 to Northampton Town), all of whom had only debuted the previous season.

Shortly after the start of the league season, the Saints signed full-back Scott Hiley on a free transfer from Manchester City, as backup for Jason Dodd and Francis Benali on either flank. They also sold Norwegian striker Stig Johansen, who had failed to make an impact in his one season in England, to Swedish club Helsingborg for £200,000 – a loss of £400,000 on his signing a year earlier. With the team struggling to make it out of the relegation zone in the league, Southampton continued adding to their squad throughout the first half of the season. In October, they brought in Moroccan midfielder Hassan Kachloul from French side Metz for £250,000, following a short trial earlier in the month. They looked to the French leagues again in December, when full-back Patrick Colleter was signed from Marseille for £300,000, again after a short trial. The same month, Danish goalkeeper Michael Stensgaard was signed from Copenhagen as backup for Paul Jones, while striker Steve Basham was loaned out to Preston North End (he later joined permanently).

In the new year, Southampton sold Carlton Palmer to Nottingham Forest for £1.1 million, after the midfielder reportedly fell out with some of his teammates. He was effectively replaced by Chris Marsden, who signed from Birmingham City for £800,000 a few weeks later. Also released in February was Italian striker Cosimo Sarli, who had joined the previous March but failed to make the step up from reserves to the first team. Later that month, the club signed Portuguese winger Dani Rodrigues for £170,000 from Feirense, having seen him play during a short loan spell at nearby Bournemouth. The Saints' final signing of 1998–99 came on transfer deadline day, 26 March, when Latvian striker Marians Pahars signed following months of negotiations related to his work permit, with the club paying Skonto £800,000 for his services to help in their battle against relegation.

Players transferred in

Name	Nationality	Pos.	Club	Date	Fee	Ref.
David Howells	England	MF	(England) Tottenham Hotspur	14 June 1998	Free	
Stuart Ripley	England	MF	(England) Blackburn Rovers	6 July 1998	£1,500,000	
Mark Paul	England	FW	(England) King's Lynn	9 July 1998	£75,000	
James Beattie	England	FW	(England) Blackburn Rovers	10 July 1998	£1,000,000	
Mark Hughes	Wales	FW	(England) Chelsea	11 July 1998	£650,000	
Scott Marshall	Scotland	DF	(England) Arsenal	14 July 1998	Free	
Alan Blayney	Northern Ireland	GK	(Northern Ireland) Glentoran	July 1998	Free (Note: Alan Blayney initially joined as a trainee in July 1998, before turning professional in July 2001.)	
Scott Hiley	England	DF	(England) Manchester City	21 August 1998	Free	
Stephen Jenkins	England	DF	none (free agent)	August 1998	Free (Note: Stephen Jenkins joined as a trainee in August 1998.)	
Hassan Kachloul	Morocco	MF	(France) Metz	16 October 1998	£250,000	
Michael Stensgaard	Denmark	GK	(Denmark) Copenhagen	2 December 1998	Free	
Patrick Colleter	France	DF	(France) Marseille	24 December 1998	£300,000	
Chris Marsden	England	MF	(England) Birmingham City	1 February 1999	£800,000	
Dani Rodrigues	Portugal	FW	(Portugal) Feirense	23 February 1999	£170,000	
Marians Pahars	Latvia	FW	(Latvia) Skonto	26 March 1999	£800,000	

Players transferred out

Name	Nationality	Pos.	Club	Date	Fee	Ref.
Kevin Davies	England	FW	(England) Blackburn Rovers	1 June 1998	£7,500,000	
Duncan Spedding	England	MF	(England) Northampton	1 July 1998	£75,000	
Kevin Richardson	England	MF	(England) Barnsley	15 July 1998	£75,000	
Lee Todd	England	DF	(England) Bradford City	1 August 1998	£250,000	
Stig Johansen	Norway	FW	(Sweden) Helsingborg	24 August 1998	£200,000	
Carlton Palmer	England	MF	(England) Nottingham Forest	19 January 1999	£1,100,000	
Cosimo Sarli	Italy	FW	(Belgium) Eendracht Aalst	8 February 1999	Free	

Players loaned in

Name	Nationality	Pos.	Club	Date from	Date to	Ref.
Scott Hiley	England	DF	(England) Manchester City	1 August 1998	20 August 1998	

Players loaned out

Name	Nationality	Pos.	Club	Date from	Date to	Ref.
Steve Basham	England	FW	(England) Preston North End	4 December 1998	18 December 1998	
Steve Basham	England	FW	(England) Preston North End	4 February 1999	9 May 1999	
Scott Marshall	Scotland	DF	(Scotland) Celtic	19 March 1999	End of season	

== Pre-season friendlies ==
Ahead of the 1998–99 season, Southampton played five pre-season friendlies. The club's pre-season period started with a 0–2 defeat at local Second Division side Bournemouth, which was followed by 1–1 draws at recently-promoted First Division side Bristol City and Third Division side Barnet. The Saints' first pre-season win came against Southern League side Bashley, who they beat 3–0, before a short trip to Belgium saw the FA Premier League side draw 2–2 with Lierse (new strikers James Beattie and Mark Hughes scoring for the visitors).

28 July 1998 Friendly	Bournemouth	2–0	Southampton	Bournemouth
				Stadium: Dean Court

1 August 1998 Friendly	Bristol City	1–1	Southampton	Bristol
			Howells	Stadium: Ashton Gate

4 August 1998 Friendly	Barnet	1–1	Southampton	London
			Le Tissier	Stadium: Underhill Stadium

6 August 1998 Friendly	Bashley	0–3	Southampton	Bashley
			Bridge; Hindmarsh; Le Tissier	Stadium: Bashley Road

9 August 1998 Friendly	(Belgium) Lierse	2–2	Southampton	Lier, Belgium
			Beattie; M. Hughes	Stadium: Herman Vanderpoortenstadion

== FA Premier League ==
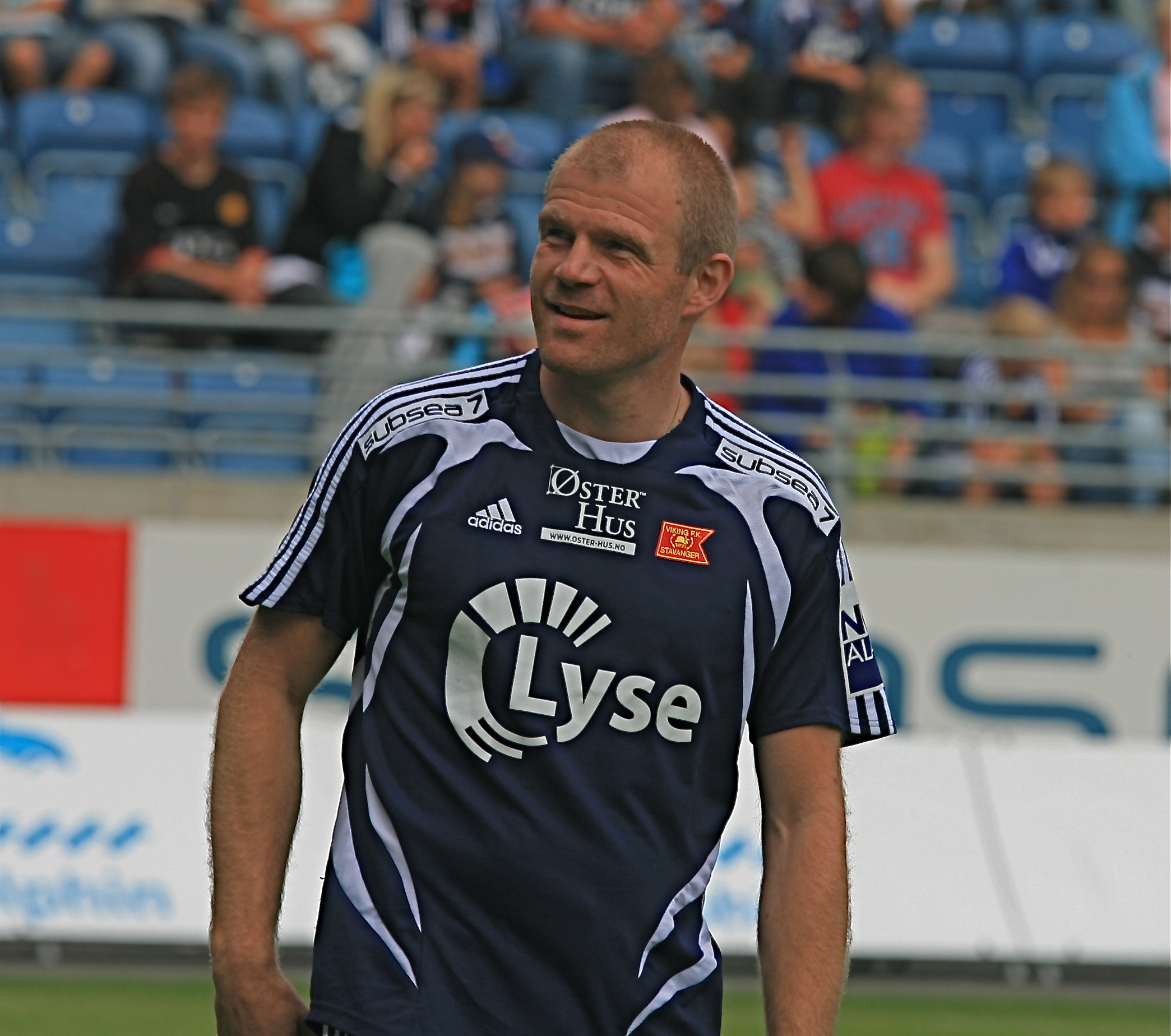
Egil Østenstad scored seven goals in the league and one in the FA Cup to finish as the club's top scorer for the season.

Southampton had their worst start to a league season ever in 1998–99, losing all five of their opening matches and dropping immediately to the bottom of the FA Premier League table. They hosted Liverpool on the opening day, who had finished third the previous season, losing 1–2 when Michael Owen scored a second-half winner after a first half that saw the hosts hold the visitors level at 1–1. This was followed the next week by a "hammering" at newly promoted side Charlton Athletic, who thrashed the Saints 5-0, with Clive Mendonca scoring a second-half hat-trick. The game also saw Southampton goalkeeper Paul Jones sent off shortly after the hour mark, which forced David Howells to go in goal as his side had already used all three permitted substitutions. Further defeats against Nottingham Forest (another promoted side) and Leeds United were followed by another away thrashing in which the Saints went down to ten men – they lost 0–4 at Newcastle United and saw Jason Dodd sent off just before half-time for a deliberate handball.

The club finally picked up their first point in mid-September at home to Tottenham Hotspur, when they salvaged a 1–1 draw in the second half through Matt Le Tissier's first goal of the campaign from open play. They remained bottom, however, with further defeats against West Ham United and Manchester United leaving them four points adrift of Coventry City in 19th and seven points away from safety, after just eight games. After another 1–1 draw, with Arsenal, the Saints picked up their first win of the season when they beat Coventry 2–1 at The Dell – goals coming in the first half from Le Tissier and Egil Østenstad. A goalless draw with Sheffield Wednesday was followed by a dramatic 3–3 stalemeate hosting Middlesbrough. After an uneventful first half, Middlesbrough found themselves 2–1 up just after the hour mark, despite losing Robbie Mustoe to a red card; 20 minutes later, the Saints had reversed the advantage to 3–2, before Phil Stamp's dismissal saw the visitors go from ten to nine men. Despite this, Southampton were unable to hold on for the final few minutes, conceding a final goal from Gianluca Festa. The club remained bottom with another home loss, 1–4 to Aston Villa, in which new signing Dion Dublin netted a hat-trick.

Southampton finally made it off the foot of the league table with a 2–0 win over Blackburn Rovers at Ewood Park in late November (goals scored by Matt Oakley and Steve Basham – his only goal for the Saints), leapfrogging the Lancashire side into 19th. They remained there only briefly, however, and returned to 20th place after three more straight losses: 0–1 at home to Derby County, 0–2 at Leicester City and 0–1 at Everton. The week before Christmas, the club picked up their third win of the campaign when they beat Wimbledon 3–1 at home, with further goals prevented by the woodwork three times and goalkeeper Neil Sullivan. 1998 ended with a 0–2 loss at home to league leaders Chelsea and a 1–1 draw with Nottingham Forest, the only side below them in the table.

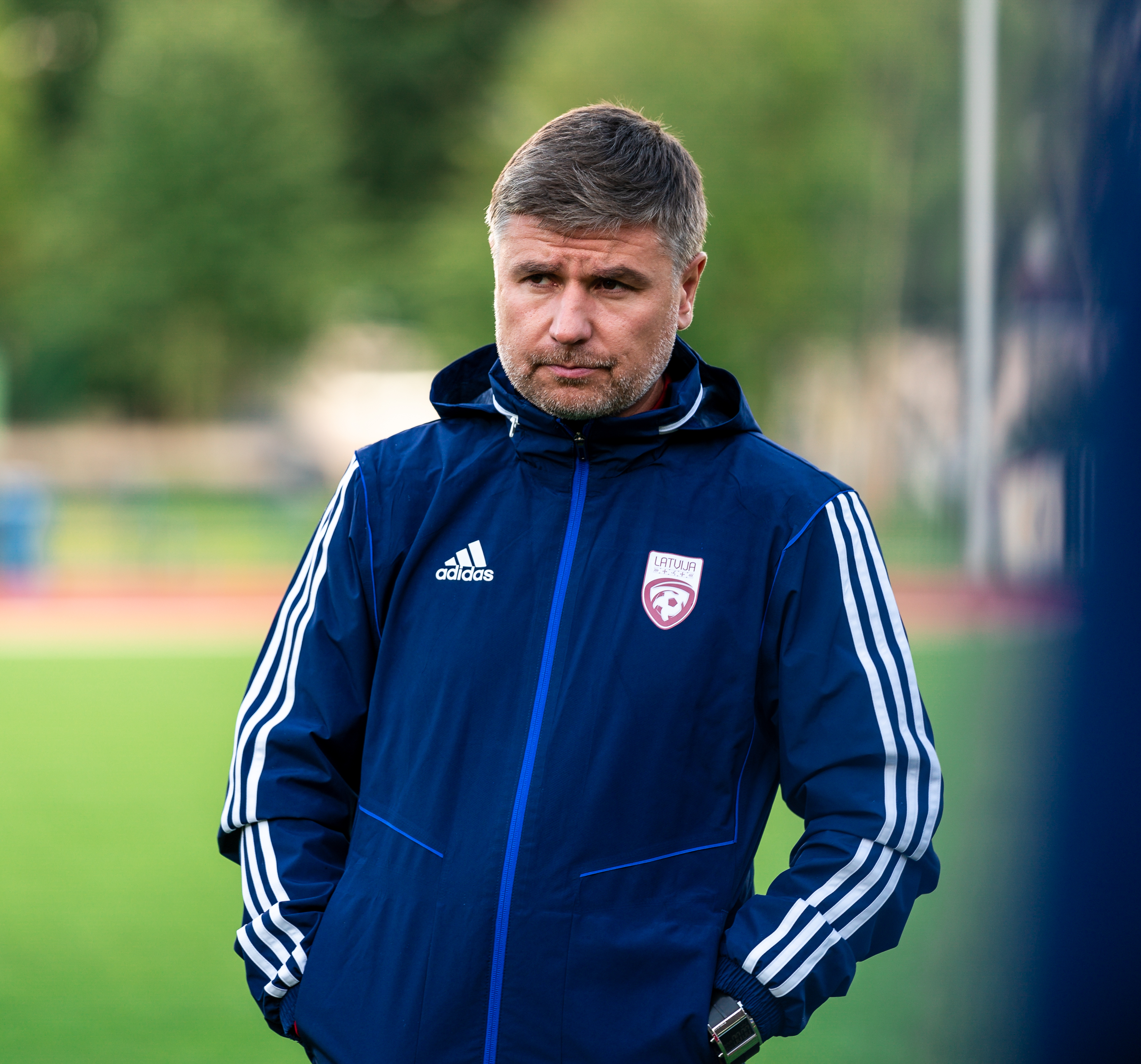
Latvian striker Marians Pahars signed on transfer deadline day 1999 and scored three goals in six games to help Southampton avoid relegation from the FA Premier League.

The new year started with a 3–1 win over Charlton Athletic, who were just a few points above the relegation zone, in which new signings Hassan Kachloul, Patrick Colleter and James Beattie all scored. The win saw Southampton move up to 18th in the table for the first time since their second game. It was followed, however, by the club's second six-goal defeat in three seasons, as they lost 1–7 to opening day opposition Liverpool at Anfield. The hosts were 3–0 up by half-time and were 5–1 up within an hour, after Robbie Fowler completed a hat-trick and Østenstad scored the visitors' sole consolation; goals from Michael Owen and David Thompson later on completed the thrashing, which manager Dave Jones described as his "lowest point as a manager" to date. Despite this setback, the Saints beat 5th-place Leeds United 3–0 in their next game a couple of weeks later, with goals from Kachloul, Oakley and Østenstad helping them keep hold of 18th place over Charlton. Chelsea won again the next week as they continued to head the table.

Back in the middle of the three relegation places, Southampton edged past Newcastle United in late-February, holding onto their first-half lead to win 2–1 over the mid-table side. Two more defeats, at Manchester United (1–2) and Tottenham Hotspur (0–3), however, kept them in the same position, four points away from safety. Two slender 1–0 wins in March over West Ham United and Sheffield Wednesday came either side of a 0–3 loss at Middlesbrough, as the Saints continued to try and escape the drop zone. They were handed a lifeline on transfer deadline day at the end of March when, after nearly two months of trying to sign him, they were granted a work permit and given permission to sign Latvian striker Marians Pahars. The next three games, however, saw the Saints pick up just one point (from a goalless draw with Arsenal) and drop back down to 19th spot in the table.

After spending the whole season in the bottom three, Southampton embarked on a five-game unbeaten run at the end of the 1998–99 season which ultimately saved their FA Premier League status. The first match of this spell was a crucial tie against Blackburn Rovers, who were two places and one spot ahead of the Saints. Ashley Ward opened the scoring for Rovers early on, but Chris Marsden responded within ten minutes with his first goal for the club; by half-time the Hampshire club were trailing 1–2 thanks to Darren Peacock, and shortly after the break it was a two-goal lead when Jason Wilcox scored. Shortly after the hour mark, however, summer signing Mark Hughes scored his first Southampton goal (in his 32nd game), and in the last ten minutes Pahars – in his second substitute appearance – headed in to make it 3–3.

A goalless draw at Derby County the week after the Blackburn game (the club's first point on the road all season) was followed by three straight wins. The first saw the Saints overcome a 0–1 deficit at home to Leicester City, with Marsden and Beattie scoring either side of half-time to help their side get out of the relegation zone for the first time all season, as Blackburn and Charlton drew. A week later, Southampton picked up their first and only away win of the campaign when they beat Wimbledon 2–0 at Selhurst Park, with late substitute Le Tissier credited for creating both goals. With Charlton just two points behind Southampton, it came down to the final day of the season to decide both clubs' fates. The Saints ultimately won their final match of the campaign 2–0 against Everton, with Pahars scoring both goals either side of half-time, both of which were set up by Beattie. Many commentators credited Pahars with saving Southampton's Premier League status, with The Independent noting that his goals had made him a "local hero" in the city. The season's end result was dubbed a "great escape" by commentators, which had been a term previously used to refer to the club's 1992–93, 1993–94, 1995–96 and 1996–97 seasons.

=== List of match results ===
16 August 1998 1	Southampton	1–2	Liverpool	Southampton
16:00 BST	Østenstad 37'	Report	Riedle 39', (yellow card); Owen 72'; Harkness (yellow card); Heggem (yellow card)	Stadium: The Dell; Attendance: 15,202; Referee: Paul Alcock

22 August 1998 2	Charlton Athletic	5–0	Southampton	London
15:00 BST	Robinson 3', (yellow card); Redfearn 46'; Mendonca 65' (pen.), 81', 90'; Newton (yellow card)	Report	Jones (red card) 65'; Beattie (yellow card); Dodd (yellow card); M. Hughes (yellow card); Palmer (yellow card)	Stadium: Selhurst Park; Attendance: 16,488; Referee: Rob Harris

29 August 1998 3	Southampton	1–2	Nottingham Forest	Southampton
15:00 BST	Le Tissier 89' (pen.); M. Hughes (yellow card); Ripley (yellow card)	Report	Darcheville 52'; Stone 68', (yellow card)	Stadium: The Dell; Attendance: 14,942; Referee: Dermot Gallagher

8 September 1998 4	Leeds United	3–0	Southampton	Leeds
19:45 BST	Marshall 38' (o.g.); Harte 52'; Wijnhard 86', (yellow card)	Report	Dodd (yellow card); M. Hughes (yellow card); Palmer (yellow card)	Stadium: Elland Road; Attendance: 30,637; Referee: Alan Wilkie

12 September 1998 5	Newcastle United	4–0	Southampton	Newcastle upon Tyne
15:00 BST	Shearer 8', 38' (pen.), (yellow card); Marshall 89' (o.g.); Ketsbaia 90'; Lee (yellow card)	Report	Dodd (red card) 38'; Hiley (yellow card); M. Hughes (yellow card); Marshall (yellow card)	Stadium: St James' Park; Attendance: 36,454; Referee: Mike Riley

19 September 1998 6	Southampton	1–1	Tottenham Hotspur	Southampton
15:00 BST	Le Tissier 64'; Benali (yellow card)	Report	Fox 25'; Calderwood (yellow card); Tramezzani (yellow card)	Stadium: The Dell; Attendance: 15,204; Referee: Keith Burge

28 September 1998 7	West Ham United	1–0	Southampton	London
20:00 BST	Wright 61', (yellow card); Ferdinand (yellow card); Ruddock (yellow card)	Report	Benali (yellow card); M. Hughes (yellow card); Le Tissier (yellow card); Monkou (yellow card)	Stadium: Boleyn Ground; Attendance: 23,153; Referee: Uriah Rennie

3 October 1998 8	Southampton	0–3	Manchester United	Southampton
15:00 BST	Palmer (yellow card)	Report	Yorke 11'; Cole 59'; Cruyff 74'; Keane (yellow card)	Stadium: The Dell; Attendance: 15,251; Referee: David Elleray

17 October 1998 9	Arsenal	1–1	Southampton	London
15:00 BST	Anelka 34'; Overmars (yellow card)	Report	Howells 67', (yellow card); M. Hughes (yellow card); Le Tissier (yellow card); Monkou (yellow card)	Stadium: Arsenal Stadium; Attendance: 38,027; Referee: Jeff Winter

24 October 1998 10	Southampton	2–1	Coventry City	Southampton
15:00 BST	Le Tissier 23', (yellow card); Østenstad 44'	Report	Dublin 60'; Boateng (yellow card); Whelan (yellow card)	Stadium: The Dell; Attendance: 15,152; Referee: Rob Harris

31 October 1998 11	Sheffield Wednesday	0–0	Southampton	Sheffield
15:00 GMT		Report	M. Hughes (yellow card)	Stadium: Hillsborough Stadium; Attendance: 30,078; Referee: Mike Riley

7 November 1998 12	Southampton	3–3	Middlesbrough	Southampton
15:00 GMT	Monkou 61', (yellow card); Beattie 82'; Østenstad 85'; M. Hughes (yellow card); Palmer (yellow card)	Report	Gascoigne 47', (yellow card); Mustoe (yellow card) (yellow-red card) 62'; Lundekvam 66' (o.g.); Stamp (red card) 87'; Festa 90'; Ricard (yellow card); Townsend (yellow card)	Stadium: The Dell; Attendance: 15,202; Referee: Paul Alcock

14 November 1998 13	Southampton	1–4	Aston Villa	Southampton
15:00 GMT	Le Tissier 53', (yellow card)	Report	Dublin 3', 56', 85'; Merson 77'; Collymore (yellow card)	Stadium: The Dell; Attendance: 15,242; Referee: Neale Barry

21 November 1998 14	Blackburn Rovers	0–2	Southampton	Blackburn
15:00 GMT	Marcolin (yellow card)	Report	Oakley 4'; Basham 89'; Dryden (yellow card); Hiley (yellow card)	Stadium: Ewood Park; Attendance: 22,812; Referee: Steve Dunn

28 November 1998 15	Southampton	0–1	Derby County	Southampton
15:00 GMT	Beattie (yellow card); Oakley (yellow card); Palmer (yellow card)	Report	Carbonari 33', (yellow card); Bohinen (yellow card); Laursen (yellow card)	Stadium: The Dell; Attendance: 14,762; Referee: Stephen Lodge

5 December 1998 16	Leicester City	2–0	Southampton	Leicester
15:00 GMT	Heskey 61'; Walsh 63'	Report	M. Hughes (yellow card)	Stadium: Filbert Street; Attendance: 18,423; Referee: Dermot Gallagher

12 December 1998 17	Everton	1–0	Southampton	Liverpool
15:00 GMT	Bakayoko 31'; Ball (yellow card); Unsworth (yellow card)	Report	M. Hughes (yellow card); Kachloul (yellow card)	Stadium: Goodison Park; Attendance: 32,073; Referee: Alan Wilkie

19 December 1998 18	Southampton	3–1	Wimbledon	Southampton
15:00 GMT	Østenstad 11', 68'; Kachloul 64', (yellow card)	Report	Gayle 76'; Perry (yellow card); Thatcher (yellow card)	Stadium: The Dell; Attendance: 14,354; Referee: Mike Reed

26 December 1998 19	Southampton	0–2	Chelsea	Southampton
12:00 GMT	Colleter (yellow card)	Report	Flo 20'; Poyet 48'; Babayaro (yellow card); Morris (yellow card)	Stadium: The Dell; Attendance: 15,253; Referee: David Elleray

28 December 1998 20	Nottingham Forest	1–1	Southampton	Nottingham
15:00 GMT	Chettle 54' (pen.); Freedman (yellow card); Stone (yellow card)	Report	Kachloul 48', (yellow card); Jones (yellow card); Palmer (yellow card)	Stadium: City Ground; Attendance: 23,456; Referee: Mike Reed

9 January 1999 21	Southampton	3–1	Charlton Athletic	Southampton
15:00 GMT	Kachloul 8'; Colleter 52'; Beattie 89', (yellow card); M. Hughes (yellow card)	Report	Hunt 13', (yellow card); Mills (yellow card); Youds (yellow card)	Stadium: The Dell; Attendance: 15,222; Referee: Graham Poll

16 January 1999 22	Liverpool	7–1	Southampton	Liverpool
15:00 GMT	Fowler 22', 37', 47'; Matteo 35'; Carragher 55', (yellow card); Owen 63'; Thompson 73'; Ince (yellow card)	Report	Østenstad 59'; Colleter (yellow card); M. Hughes (yellow card); Monk (yellow card)	Stadium: Anfield; Attendance: 44,011; Referee: Uriah Rennie

30 January 1999 23	Southampton	3–0	Leeds United	Southampton
15:00 GMT	Kachloul 31'; Oakley 62'; Østenstad 86'; Dodd (yellow card); M. Hughes (yellow card); Lundekvam (yellow card)	Report	Bowyer (yellow card); Haaland (yellow card); Smith (yellow card); Woodgate (yellow card)	Stadium: The Dell; Attendance: 15,236; Referee: Steve Dunn

6 February 1999 24	Chelsea	1–0	Southampton	London
15:00 GMT	Zola 11'; Di Matteo (yellow card)	Report	Marsden (yellow card); Oakley (yellow card)	Stadium: Stamford Bridge; Attendance: 34,920; Referee: Rob Harris

20 February 1999 25	Southampton	2–1	Newcastle United	Southampton
15:00 GMT	Beattie 16'; Dodd 43' (pen.); Kachloul (yellow card); Lundekvam (yellow card)	Report	Hamann 86'; Domi (yellow card); Howey (yellow card); Shearer (yellow card); Speed (yellow card)	Stadium: The Dell; Attendance: 15,244; Referee: Graham Poll

27 February 1999 26	Manchester United	2–1	Southampton	Manchester
15:00 GMT	Keane 79'; Yorke 83'	Report	Le Tissier 90', (yellow card); Colleter (yellow card)	Stadium: Old Trafford; Attendance: 55,316; Referee: Peter Jones

2 March 1999 27	Tottenham Hotspur	3–0	Southampton	London
19:45 GMT	Armstrong 19'; Iversen 68'; Dominguez 90'; Young (yellow card)	Report	Le Tissier (yellow card)	Stadium: White Hart Lane; Attendance: 28,580; Referee: Alan Wilkie

6 March 1999 28	Southampton	1–0	West Ham United	Southampton
15:00 GMT	Kachloul 10'	Report		Stadium: The Dell; Attendance: 15,240; Referee: Dermot Gallagher

14 March 1999 29	Middlesbrough	3–0	Southampton	Middlesbrough
16:00 GMT	Beck 44'; Ricard 45'; Vickers 62'	Report	Kachloul (yellow card); Le Tissier (yellow card); Marsden (yellow card); Monkou (yellow card)	Stadium: Riverside Stadium; Attendance: 33,387; Referee: Mike Reed

20 March 1999 30	Southampton	1–0	Sheffield Wednesday	Southampton
15:00 GMT	Le Tissier 41', (yellow card); Marsden (yellow card)	Report	Booth (yellow card)	Stadium: The Dell; Attendance: 15,201; Referee: Rob Harris

3 April 1999 31	Southampton	0–0	Arsenal	Southampton
15:00 BST	Colleter (yellow card); M. Hughes (yellow card); Monkou (yellow card)	Report	Vieira (yellow card)	Stadium: The Dell; Attendance: 15,255; Referee: Peter Jones

5 April 1999 32	Coventry City	1–0	Southampton	Coventry
15:00 BST	Boateng 64', (yellow card); McAllister (yellow card); Whelan (yellow card); Williams (yellow card)	Report	Dodd (yellow card)	Stadium: Highfield Road; Attendance: 21,404; Referee: Uriah Rennie

10 April 1999 33	Aston Villa	3–0	Southampton	Birmingham
15:00 BST	Draper 13'; Joachim 66'; Dublin 88'	Report	Lundekvam (yellow card) (yellow-red card) 40'; Monkou (yellow card)	Stadium: Villa Park; Attendance: 32,203; Referee: Neale Barry

17 April 1999 34	Southampton	3–3	Blackburn Rovers	Southampton
15:00 BST	Marsden 22'; M. Hughes 61'; Pahars 85'; D. Hughes (yellow card); Le Tissier (yellow card)	Report	Ward 14'; Peacock 25'; Wilcox 47'; Gillespie (yellow card); McAteer (yellow card)	Stadium: The Dell; Attendance: 15,209; Referee: Graham Barber

24 April 1999 35	Derby County	0–0	Southampton	Derby
15:00 BST	Burton (yellow card); Delap (yellow card); Prior (yellow card)	Report	Beattie (yellow card); Pahars (yellow card)	Stadium: Pride Park Stadium; Attendance: 26,557; Referee: Alan Wilkie

1 May 1999 36	Southampton	2–1	Leicester City	Southampton
15:00 BST	Marsden 36'; Beattie 74'; Østenstad (yellow card)	Report	Marshall 17'; Elliott (yellow card); Lennon (yellow card)	Stadium: The Dell; Attendance: 15,228; Referee: Dermot Gallagher

8 May 1999 37	Wimbledon	0–2	Southampton	London
15:00 BST	Roberts (yellow card)	Report	Beattie 72'; Earle 84' (o.g.); Marsden (yellow card)	Stadium: Selhurst Park; Attendance: 24,068; Referee: Steve Dunn

15 May 1999 38	Southampton	2–0	Everton	Southampton
16:00 BST	Pahars 24', 68', (yellow card); Le Tissier (yellow card); Marsden (yellow card)	Report	Hutchison (yellow card)	Stadium: The Dell; Attendance: 15,254; Referee: Graham Barber

=== Final league table ===
Pos	Team	Pld	W	D	L	GF	GA	GD	Pts	Qualification or relegation
15	Coventry City	38	11	9	18	39	51	−12	42	
16	Wimbledon	38	10	12	16	40	63	−23	42	
17	Southampton	38	11	8	19	37	64	−27	41	
18	Charlton Athletic (R)	38	8	12	18	41	56	−15	36	Relegation to Football League First Division
19	Blackburn Rovers (R)	38	7	14	17	38	52	−14	35	Relegation to Football League First Division

Source: RSSSF
Rules for classification: 1) points; 2) goal difference; 3) number of goals scored.
(R) Relegated

=== Results by matchday ===
Round	1	2	3	4	5	6	7	8	9	10	11	12	13	14	15	16	17	18	19	20	21	22	23	24	25	26	27	28	29	30	31	32	33	34	35	36	37	38
Ground	H	A	H	A	A	H	A	H	A	H	A	H	H	A	H	A	A	H	H	A	H	A	H	A	H	A	A	H	A	H	H	A	A	H	A	H	A	H
Result	L	L	L	L	L	D	L	L	D	W	D	D	L	W	L	L	L	W	L	D	W	L	W	L	W	L	L	W	L	W	D	L	L	D	D	W	W	W
Position	17	20	20	20	20	20	20	20	20	20	20	20	20	19	19	20	20	19	19	19	18	18	18	18	19	19	19	19	19	18	18	19	19	19	19	17	17	17

Source: 11v11.com
A = Away; H = Home; W = Win; D = Draw; L = Loss

== FA Cup ==
Southampton entered the 1998–99 FA Cup in the third round against Fulham, who had knocked the Saints out of the League Cup just over three months earlier, and were by now leading the Second Division. Despite being the visiting side, the Cottagers opened the scoring within ten minutes, when Steve Hayward scored from just outside the penalty area. Fulham defended strongly to keep the increasingly frustrated Premier League side at bay, which culminated in them going down to ten men in the 70th minute, when centre-back Ken Monkou was shown a straight red card for an allegedly two-footed tackle on Rufus Brevett. The fight for an equaliser continued and eventually resulted in a goal for the hosts, when Egil Østenstad forced in from close range after a previously deflected effort. Fulham dominated the replay at Craven Cottage, although it took until the 85th minute for them to break the deadlock, eventually finding success when Barry Hayles took advantage of a deflection in the box to send his side through.

2 January 1999 Round 3	Southampton	1–1	Fulham	Southampton
	Monkou (red card) 70'; Østenstad 89'; Palmer (yellow card)		Hayward 9', (yellow card); Horsfield (yellow card); Symons (yellow card)	Stadium: The Dell; Attendance: 12,549; Referee: Dermot Gallagher

13 January 1999 Round 3 Replay	Fulham	1–0	Southampton	London
	Hayles 85'; Coleman (yellow card); Symons (yellow card)		Beattie (yellow card)	Stadium: Craven Cottage; Attendance: 17,448; Referee: Dermot Gallagher

== League Cup ==
Southampton entered the 1998–99 League Cup in the second round against Second Division side Fulham. The first leg, at Craven Cottage, finished 1–1 when Chris Coleman's 54th-minute opener was matched by James Beattie just after the hour mark. The Saints lost the second leg 0–1 thanks to an early Dirk Lehmann goal, with Carlton Palmer sent off ten minutes before the end of the first half.

15 September 1998 Round 2 Leg 1	Fulham	1–1	Southampton	London
	Coleman 54'; Bracewell (yellow card); Hayward (yellow card); Morgan (yellow card)		Beattie 62'; Howells (yellow card); M. Hughes (yellow card)	Stadium: Craven Cottage; Attendance: 10,222; Referee: Mike Reed

23 September 1998 Round 2 Leg 2	Southampton	0–1 (1–2 agg.)	Fulham	Southampton
	Palmer (yellow card) (yellow-red card) 36'		Lehmann 10'	Stadium: The Dell; Attendance: 11,645; Referee: Paul Durkin

== Other matches ==
Outside the league and cup competitions, Southampton played two additional matches during the early stages of the 1998–99 season. The first, on 2 September, saw the Saints beat Conference side Morecambe 3–0, in a game to mark the opening of Christie Park's new North Stand. In the second, just over a month later, the FA Premier League side agreed to play King's Lynn of the Southern League in exchange for the £75,000 signing of Mark Paul. After a good start for the hosts, the Saints went 2–0 up in the first half through an Egil Østenstad double, before Wayne Bridge scored a third after the break to secure a 3–0 win.

2 September 1998 Friendly	Morecambe	0–3	Southampton	Morecambe
			Le Tissier; Wallace (o.g.)	Stadium: Christie Park

7 October 1998 Friendly	King's Lynn	0–3	Southampton	King's Lynn
			Østenstad; Bridge	Stadium: The Walks; Attendance: 1,525; Referee: Steve Cling

== Player details ==
Southampton used 31 players during the 1998–99 season, 13 of whom scored during the campaign. 13 players made their debut appearances for the club, including ten of their 13 first team signings (James Beattie, Patrick Colleter, Scott Hiley, David Howells, Mark Hughes, Hassan Kachloul, Chris Marsden, Scott Marshall, Marians Pahars, and Stuart Ripley) and three players making the step up from youth to the first team (Shayne Bradley, Wayne Bridge, and Garry Monk). Two of these – Howells and Marshall – also made their last appearances for the Saints during the campaign, as did mid-season departees Steve Basham and Carlton Palmer, plus three players sold the next season (David Hirst, Ken Monkou, and Andy Williams), one sold in a future season (Phil Warner), and one who later retired (David Hughes). New striker Beattie made the most appearances for Southampton during the season, playing in 39 of the side's 42 games in all competitions. Egil Østenstad finished as the club's top goalscorer with eight goals in all competitions, equal on seven league goals with Matt Le Tissier. Beattie, who finished third on six goals in all competitions, won the Southampton F.C. Player of the Season award for 1998–99.

=== Squad statistics ===
No.	Name	Pos.	Nat.	League		FA Cup		League Cup		Total		Discipline	
No.	Name	Pos.	Nat.	Apps.	Goals	Apps.	Goals	Apps.	Goals	Apps.	Goals	Yellow card	Red card
1	Paul Jones	GK	(Wales)	31	0	2	0	2	0	35	0	1	1
2	Jason Dodd	DF	(England)	27(1)	1	2	0	2	0	31(1)	1	4	1
3	John Beresford	DF	(England)	1(3)	0	0	0	0	0	1(3)	0	0	0
4	Chris Marsden	MF	(England)	14	2	0	0	0	0	14	2	5	0
5	Claus Lundekvam	DF	(Norway)	30(3)	0	2	0	1(1)	0	33(4)	0	3	1
6	Ken Monkou	DF	(Netherlands)	22	1	2	0	0	0	24	1	6	1
7	Matt Le Tissier	MF	(England)	20(10)	6	0(1)	0	2	0	22(11)	6	10	0
8	Matt Oakley	MF	(England)	21(1)	2	2	0	0	0	23(1)	2	2	0
9	Mark Hughes	FW	(Wales)	32	1	1(1)	0	2	0	35(1)	1	15	0
10	Egil Østenstad	FW	(Norway)	27(7)	7	2	1	2	0	31(7)	8	1	0
11	David Howells	MF	(England)	8(1)	1	1	0	1	0	10(1)	1	2	0
12	Richard Dryden	DF	(England)	4	0	0	0	0	0	4	0	1	0
13	Neil Moss	GK	(England)	7	0	0	0	0	0	7	0	0	0
14	Stuart Ripley	MF	(England)	16(6)	0	0(1)	0	1	0	17(7)	0	1	0
15	Francis Benali	DF	(England)	19(4)	0	0	0	2	0	21(4)	0	2	0
16	James Beattie	FW	(England)	22(13)	5	2	0	1(1)	1	25(14)	6	5	0
17	Mark Paul	FW	(England)	0	0	0	0	0	0	0	0	0	0
18	Wayne Bridge	DF	(England)	15(8)	0	0	0	1	0	16(8)	0	0	0
20	Scott Bevan	GK	(England)	0	0	0	0	0	0	0	0	0	0
21	Andy Williams	MF	(Wales)	0(1)	0	0	0	0	0	0(1)	0	0	0
22	David Hughes	MF	(England)	6(3)	0	0	0	0	0	6(3)	0	1	0
23	Scott Hiley	DF	(England)	27(2)	0	1	0	0	0	28(2)	0	2	0
24	Steve Basham	FW	(England)	0(4)	1	0	0	0(1)	0	0(5)	1	0	0
25	Garry Monk	DF	(England)	4	0	0(1)	0	0	0	4(1)	0	1	0
27	David Hirst	FW	(England)	0(2)	0	0	0	0	0	0(2)	0	0	0
28	Kevin Gibbens	MF	(England)	2(2)	0	0	0	2	0	4(2)	0	0	0
29	Phil Warner	DF	(England)	5	0	0	0	1	0	6	0	0	0
30	Hassan Kachloul	MF	(Morocco)	18(4)	5	2	0	0	0	20(4)	5	5	0
31	Shayne Bradley	FW	(England)	0(3)	0	0	0	0	0	0(3)	0	0	0
33	Patrick Colleter	DF	(France)	16	1	2	0	0	0	18	1	4	0
35	Marians Pahars	FW	(Latvia)	4(2)	3	0	0	0	0	4(2)	3	2	0
Squad members who left before the end of the season
4	Carlton Palmer	MF	(England)	18(1)	0	1	0	2	0	21(1)	0	8	1
26	Cosimo Sarli	FW	(Italy)	0	0	0	0	0	0	0	0	0	0
Squad members who ended the season out on loan
19	Scott Marshall	DF	(Scotland)	2	0	0	0	0	0	2	0	1	0

=== Most appearances ===
Rank	Name	Pos.	League		FA Cup		League Cup		Total		
Rank	Name	Pos.	Starts	Subs	Starts	Subs	Starts	Subs	Starts	Subs	Total
1	James Beattie	FW	22	13	2	0	1	1	25	14	39
2	Egil Østenstad	FW	27	7	2	0	2	0	31	7	38
3	Claus Lundekvam	DF	30	3	2	0	1	1	33	4	37
4	Mark Hughes	FW	32	0	1	1	2	0	35	1	36
5	Paul Jones	GK	31	0	2	0	2	0	35	0	35
6	Matt Le Tissier	MF	20	10	0	1	2	0	22	11	33
7	Jason Dodd	DF	27	1	2	0	2	0	31	1	32
8	Scott Hiley	DF	27	2	1	0	0	0	28	2	30
9	Francis Benali	DF	19	4	0	0	2	0	21	4	25
10	Ken Monkou	DF	22	0	2	0	0	0	24	0	24
10	Matt Oakley	MF	21	1	2	0	0	0	23	1	24
10	Hassan Kachloul	MF	18	4	2	0	0	0	20	4	24
10	Wayne Bridge	DF	15	8	0	0	1	0	16	8	24

=== Top goalscorers ===
Rank	Name	Pos.	League		FA Cup		League Cup		Total		
Rank	Name	Pos.	Goals	Apps	Goals	Apps	Goals	Apps	Goals	Apps	GPG
1	Egil Østenstad	FW	7	34	1	2	0	2	8	38	0.21
2	Matt Le Tissier	MF	6	30	0	1	0	2	6	33	0.18
3	James Beattie	FW	5	35	0	2	1	2	6	39	0.15
4	Hassan Kachloul	MF	5	22	0	2	0	0	5	24	0.21
5	Marians Pahars	FW	3	6	0	0	0	0	3	6	0.50
6	Chris Marsden	MF	2	14	0	0	0	0	2	14	0.14
7	Matt Oakley	MF	2	22	0	2	0	0	2	24	0.08
8	Steve Basham	FW	1	4	0	0	0	1	1	5	0.20
8	David Howells	MF	1	9	0	1	0	1	1	11	0.09
8	Patrick Colleter	DF	1	16	0	2	0	0	1	18	0.06
8	Ken Monkou	DF	1	22	0	2	0	0	1	24	0.04
8	Jason Dodd	DF	1	28	0	2	0	2	1	32	0.03
8	Mark Hughes	FW	1	32	0	2	0	2	1	36	0.03

== Bibliography ==
- Holley, Duncan; Chalk, Gary (2003), Bull, David (ed.), In That Number: A Post-War Chronicle of Southampton FC, Bristol, England: Hagiology Publishing, ISBN 0-9534474-3-X
