= Mean Machine (film) =

2001 film by Barry Skolnick

- Theatrical release poster
- Directed by: Barry Skolnick
- Screenplay by: Charlie Fletcher; Chris Baker; Andrew Day
- Based on: The Longest Yard by Tracy Keenan Wynn
- Produced by: Matthew Vaughn
- Starring: Vinnie Jones; David Kelly; David Hemmings; Vas Blackwood; Jason Flemyng; Danny Dyer; Jason Statham
- Cinematography: Alex Barber
- Edited by: Eddie Hamilton; Dayn Williams
- Music by: John Murphy
- Production companies: SKA Films; Ruddy/Morgan Productions; Brad Grey Pictures
- Distributed by: Paramount Classics (United States, Canada and worldwide home media); Paramount Pictures (International; through United International Pictures)
- Release date: 26 December 2001
- Running time: 99 minutes
- Countries: United Kingdom; United States
- Language: English
- Budget: £2.5 million
- Box office: $7.3 million

Mean Machine is a 2001 sports comedy film directed by Barry Skolnick and starring former footballer Vinnie Jones. The film is an adaptation of the 1974 American film The Longest Yard, featuring association football rather than American football.

== Plot ==
Danny "The Mean Machine" Meehan is a retired footballer and former captain of England who was banned from football for life for fixing an unspecified match they played against Germany. In the present day, after a long drinking session, he drives recklessly to a local bar where he is pursued by police. Inside the bar, when asked to take a breathalyser test, he attacks two police officers and is arrested. He is later convicted and sentenced to three years in Longmarsh prison.

Inside, his status as a celebrity immediately puts him at odds with the guards, who brutally beat him on arrival. The prison governor then pulls strings to ensure Meehan serves his sentence in Longmarsh as the head coach of the prison wardens' football team. However, Meehan declines, and instead trains a team of other convicts to play against the wardens.

Meehan is met with an unwelcome reception from his cellmates, Raj, Jerome, and Trojan. Outside, Meehan meets and befriends an elderly convict, Doc, who teaches him how to survive in prison. While cleaning the yards with Doc, Meehan is introduced to Sykes, a gangster and one of the most respected inmates in the prison. Sykes also shows hostility towards Meehan, revealing he lost a large amount of money betting on the England game he had fixed. Later, in the prison cafeteria, Meehan makes another ally, meeting the prison's fast-talking contraband dealer "Massive".

Meehan and Massive begin the recruitment process for his team, but struggle, as many of the inmates are reluctant to join due to both Sykes' influence over the prison and their hatred for Meehan as a cheat. As Meehan tries and fails to form a team, Massive is playing football in a prison hallway, when a racist guard approaches him and assaults him as the other inmates watch in horror. Meehan lunges at the guard and protects Massive from further beating, earning the respect of many of the other inmates. His team includes a violent maximum-security inmate named "The Monk". Meanwhile, the warden gets himself into trouble with "Barry the Bookie," an unlicensed bookmaker who was recommended to him by Sykes. After being threatened on the phone by Barry, the warden decides to try to make back the money he owes by betting on the prison guards' team.

A psychotic inmate named Nitro accuses Meehan of being a snitch. Meehan gets ambushed in the showers and threatened but refuses to tell, earning the trust of both Sykes' men and Sykes himself. To win the lost money back, Sykes bribes Meehan: all is forgiven if his team wins. Angry that his plan to have Meehan killed failed, Nitro, a bomb expert, offers to have Meehan killed in exchange for a transfer to a lower security prison which one of the guards, Ratchett, agrees to. Nitro crafts a bomb in his cell and places it in Meehan locker. Meehan and the rest of the team are going over tactics in one of the cells, when Doc arrives at the cell and is killed by the bomb. Nitro is subsequently sent to another facility, but not to the minimum-security prison he was promised, but to a mental health facility.

The match starts shortly after Doc's death. At half time, the inmates' team is leading 1–0, and the morale is high until the governor attempts to blackmail Meehan, accusing him of being an accessory to Doc's murder and threatening to sentence him to 20 years unless he throws the match. At first, he puts his own interests before that of the team's, deliberately playing poorly and faking injury to be taken off the pitch. As the final moments of the game tick down, he redeems himself, bravely using a square-ball to fellow inmate 'Billy the Limpet' to win the game for the cons. Afterward, the Captain of the Guards, Burton, refuses to co-operate with the governor's attempts to get revenge on Meehan, instead congratulating him on the win. The governor's vehicle explodes, and Sykes informs him that he and Barry the Bookie will retaliate if he tries anything. A victorious Meehan and Massive walk triumphantly across the pitch.

== Cast ==
- Vinnie Jones as Danny Meehan
- David Kelly as Doc
- Jason Statham as Monk
- Jamie Sives as Chiv
- Danny Dyer as Billy the Limpet
- Stephen Walters as Nitro
- Rocky Marshall as Cigs
- Adam Fogerty as Mouse
- David Hemmings as Governor
- Ralph Brown as Burton
- Vas Blackwood as Massive
- Robbie Gee as Trojan
- Geoff Bell as Ratchett
- John Forgeham as Sykes
- Sally Phillips as Tracey
- Andrew Grainger as Kat
- Jason Flemyng as Bob Likely
- Martin Wimbush as Z
- David Reid as Barman
- David Cropman as Second Barman
- Omid Djalili as Raj
- J. J. Connolly as Barry the Bookie
- Jake Abraham as Bob Carter

The film included actors who had formerly played professional football, including three players who were teammates with the film's star, Vinnie Jones, at different times in their careers. Charlie Hartfield (prisoners' team in the film) played with Jones for Sheffield United, while Paul Fishenden and Brian Gayle (guards' team in the film) played with Jones for Wimbledon. Nevin Saroya (prisoners' team) was once a Brentford youth team player and Perry Digweed (guard's team), played as a goalkeeper primarily for Brighton & Hove Albion, although in the film, he is a defender. Ryan Giggs, then playing for Manchester United and the Wales national football team, appears briefly (at minute 77:00) as a warden.

== Production ==
Producer Matthew Vaughn, while looking for a film vehicle to highlight ex-football star Vinnie Jones, came across director Robert Aldrich's 1974 American football comedy The Longest Yard. Jones, who was known for rough play and off-field rowdiness, seemed a natural for the lead role.

Mean Machine was filmed from April to June 2001. Most of the prison scenes were filmed at HM Prison Oxford, and the match was filmed at The Warren, the former home ground of Yeading. The Warren is located in Hayes.

== Reception ==
=== Box office ===
Mean Machine was released in United Kingdom cinemas on 28 December 2001 and according to the box office database website Box Office Mojo, grossed $2,288,365 during its opening weekend with a total domestic gross of $6,288,153 (as of 27 January 2002). The film was released in the United States on 22 February 2002 with total a gross of $92,770. Total foreign gross (excluding the United States) was $929,283 (as of 23 February 2003).

=== Critical response ===
On the review aggregator website Rotten Tomatoes, 33% of 55 critics' reviews are positive, with an average rating of 4.9/10. Metacritic, which uses a weighted average, assigned the film a score of 45 out of 100, based on 25 critics, indicating "mixed or average" reviews. A major criticism of the film was that it was unintentionally funny and led to "prison cliches".

Jamie Russell of the BBC wrote, "[I]t keeps its tongue welded firmly in its cheek. The scriptwriters have enough sense to replay every funny moment from the original, while also adding a couple of innovations of their own. The final soccer game is definitely the high point of the proceedings, if only because it lets the star do what he does best - play some very dirty football."

While A. O. Scott of The New York Times wrote, "Reviewing ''The Longest Yard'' in The New York Times 28 years ago, Nora Sayre objected to its clumsiness and violence, but admitted to being entertained by the football sequences. Watching this remake, I had the opposite response: the story was moderately engaging and moved swiftly, but the long soccer match at the end bored me silly. Perhaps this is just American chauvinism, or perhaps that kind of football is inherently less cinematic than ours. It's certainly no less brutal."

== See also ==
- List of association football films
