= Phil Warner =

English footballer (born 1979)

Personal information
- Full name: Philip Warner
- Date of birth: 2 February 1979 (age 47)
- Place of birth: Southampton, England
- Height: 1.78 m (5 ft 10 in)
- Position: Utility player

Youth career
- Southampton

Senior career*
Years	Team	Apps	(Gls)
1997–2001	Southampton	6	(0)
1999–2000	→ Brentford (loan)	13	(0)
2001–2003	Cambridge United	20	(0)
2003–2004	Eastleigh	19	(2)
2004–2005	Aldershot Town	20	(0)
2005	→ Eastbourne Borough (loan)	13	(0)
2005–2006	Eastbourne Borough	31	(1)
2006–2008	Havant & Waterlooville	28	(0)
2008	→ Bognor Regis Town (loan)	2	(0)
2008–2009	Totton		
2009–2010	Heidelberg United		
2010–2011	Poole Town		
- * Club domestic league appearances and goals

Philip Warner (born 2 February 1979) is an English retired semi-professional footballer, who played as a utility player in the Premier League for Southampton and in the Football League for Cambridge United and Brentford. After his release from Cambridge United in 2003, he dropped into non-League football and had a brief spell playing in Australia.

== Career ==
=== Southampton ===
A utility player, Warner began his career in the youth system at Premier League club Southampton and signed his first professional contract in August 1997. He made his senior debut as a 39th-minute substitute for Jason Dodd in a 1–1 draw with Tottenham Hotspur on 10 May 1998. Warner made six appearances during the 1998–99 season, but failed to appear after October 1998. On 2 July 1999, Warner joined newly promoted Second Division club Brentford on a season-long loan, with a view to a permanent move. He made just 15 appearances and returned to The Dell two months early, in March 2000. Warner returned to the Southampton first team squad during the 2000–01 season, but failed to make any further appearances before his release in May 2001.

=== Cambridge United ===
On 31 May 2001, Warner signed a two-year contract with Second Division club Cambridge United on a free transfer. He made just 16 appearances during the 2001–02 season, at the end of which the Us were relegated to the Third Division. Warner was mostly out of favour with manager John Taylor during the first half of the 2002–03 season and was released on 10 January 2003, in a cost-cutting exercise. He made 26 appearances during 18 months at the Abbey Stadium.

=== Non-League football ===
On 24 January 2003, Warner dropped into non-League football to join Wessex League club Eastleigh. Over the following six years he also would play for Aldershot Town, Eastbourne Borough, Havant & Waterlooville, Bognor Regis Town and Totton, before travelling to Australia and playing for Heidelberg United. Warner joined his final club, Poole Town, in 2010 and retired in 2011.

== Personal life ==
Warner attended Redbridge Community School. As of January 2008, he was living in Bassett and was working as a van driver and property developer. After his retirement from football in 2011, he became a sports masseur.

== Career statistics ==
Appearances and goals by club, season and competition
Club	Season	League			FA Cup		League Cup		Other		Total	
Club	Season	Division	Apps	Goals	Apps	Goals	Apps	Goals	Apps	Goals	Apps	Goals
Southampton	1997–98	Premier League	1	0	0	0	0	0	—		1	0
Southampton	1998–99	Premier League	5	0	0	0	1	0	—		6	0
Southampton	2000–01	Premier League	0	0	0	0	0	0	—		0	0
Southampton	Total		6	0	0	0	1	0	—		7	0
Brentford (loan)	1999–00	Second Division	13	0	1	0	1	0	0	0	15	0
Cambridge United	2001–02	Second Division	12	0	2	0	0	0	2 (Note: Appearances in Football League Trophy)	0	16	0
Cambridge United	2002–03	Third Division	8	0	0	0	2	0	0	0	10	0
Cambridge United	Total		20	0	2	0	2	0	2	0	26	0
Eastleigh	2003–04	Southern League First Division East	19	2	0	0	—		0	0	19	2
Aldershot Town	2004–05	Conference Premier	20	0	1	0	—		0	0	21	0
Eastbourne Borough (loan)	2004–05	Conference South	13	0	—		—		1 (Note: Appearance in Conference South play-offs)	0	14	0
Eastbourne Borough	2005–06	Conference South	31	1	1	0	—		0	0	32	1
Eastbourne Borough	Total		44	1	1	0	—		1	0	46	1
Havant & Waterlooville	2006–07	Conference South	19	0	3	0	—		4 (Note: 2 appearances in FA Trophy, 2 appearances in Hampshire Senior Cup)	0	26	0
Havant & Waterlooville	2007–08	Conference South	9	0	3	0	—		2 (Note: 1 appearance in FA Trophy, 1 appearance in Conference League Cup)	0	14	0
Havant & Waterlooville	Total		28	0	6	0	—		6	0	40	0
Bognor Regis Town (loan)	2007–08	Conference South	2	0	—		—		—		2	0
Career total			152	3	10	0	4	0	9	0	175	3

== Honours ==
Eastleigh

- Wessex League: 2002–03
