= Clement James (footballer) =

English footballer (born 1981)

Personal information
- Full name: Clement Junior James
- Date of birth: 10 March 1981 (age 45)
- Place of birth: Ascot, England
- Height: 5 ft 10 in (1.78 m)
- Positions: Left winger; forward

Youth career
- –1999: Brentford

Senior career*
Years	Team	Apps	(Gls)
1999–2000	Brentford	1	(0)
2000	→ Slough Town (loan)	1	(0)
2001–2003	Slough Town	33	(3)
2003–2004	Boreham Wood	20	(3)
2004	Burnham	11	(0)
2004	Hayes	4	(1)
2004	Hemel Hempstead Town	1	(0)
2005–2008	Staines Town	35	(2)
2007	→ Slough Town (loan)	4	(0)
2008–2009	Enfield Town	2	(0)
2009	Kingstonian	4	(0)
- * Club domestic league appearances and goals

Clement Junior James (born 10 March 1981) is an English retired semi-professional footballer who made one appearance in the Football League for Brentford as a left winger. After his release in 2000, he embarked on a career in non-League football.

== Career ==
=== Brentford ===
A left winger or forward, James began his career in the youth system at Brentford and signed a one-year professional contract at the end of the 1998–99 season. He made one appearance for the club, as a late substitute for Lloyd Owusu during a 1–0 Second Division defeat to Stoke City on 8 April 2000. James was released in May 2000 and the 8 minutes he spent on the pitch on his debut makes his one of the shortest Brentford first team careers.

=== Non-League football ===
James joined Isthmian League Premier Division club Slough Town on loan in August 2000 and returned to Arbour Park on a permanent basis in August 2001, but suffered a ruptured anterior cruciate ligament in pre-season friendly versus Maidenhead United in 2002. He reunited with his former Slough Town manager Steve Browne at Isthmian League First Division North club Boreham Wood in June 2003. James followed Browne out of Meadow Park when Browne was sacked in January 2004. He finished the 2003–04 season with Burnham, before joining Hayes in time for the beginning of the 2004–05 season. James scored one goal in four appearances before being released in September 2004 and after a brief spell with Hemel Hempstead Town, he moved to Staines Town in February 2005. He remained with Staines Town until 2008 and briefly played for Enfield Town, before moving to Kingstonian in early 2009. He played seven games for the Ks before leaving on 27 July 2009.

== Career statistics ==
Appearances and goals by club, season and competition
Club	Season	League			FA Cup		League Cup		Other		Total	
Club	Season	Division	Apps	Goals	Apps	Goals	Apps	Goals	Apps	Goals	Apps	Goals
Brentford	1999–00	Second Division	1	0	0	0	0	0	0	0	1	0
Slough Town (loan)	2000–01	Isthmian League Premier Division	1	0	—		—		3 (Note: 1 appearance in FA Trophy, 1 appearance in Isthmian League Full Members Cup, 1 appearance in Isthmian League Cup)	1	4	1
Slough Town	2001–02	Isthmian League First Division	31	3	1	0	—		5 (Note: 2 appearances in Isthmian League Cup, 2 appearances in Berks & Bucks Senior Cup, 1 appearance in FA Trophy)	0	37	3
Slough Town	2002–03	Isthmian League First Division North	1	0	0	0	—		0	0	1	0
Slough Town	Total		33	3	1	0	—		8	1	42	4
Boreham Wood	2003–04	Isthmian League First Division North	20	3	0	0	—		0	0	31	4
Burnham	2003–04	Southern League First Division East	11	0	—		—		—		11	0
Hayes	2004–05	Conference South	4	1	0	0	—		0	0	4	1
Hemel Hempstead Town	2004–05	Southern League Premier Division	1	0	—		—		0	0	1	0
Staines Town	2004–05	Isthmian League Premier Division	9	1	—		—		—		9	1
Staines Town	2005–06	Isthmian League Premier Division	16	1	0	0	—		1 (Note: Appearance in Isthmian League Cup)	0	17	1
Staines Town	2006–07	Isthmian League Premier Division	7	0	0	0	—		1	0	8	0
Staines Town	2008–09	Isthmian League Premier Division	3	0	0	0	—		0	0	3	0
Staines Town	Total		35	2	0	0	—		2	0	37	2
Slough Town (loan)	2007–08	Southern League First Division South & West	4	0	—		—		—		4	0
Slough Town (loan)	Total		37	3	1	0	—		8	1	46	4
Enfield Town	2008–09	Isthmian League First Division North	2	0	—		—		—		2	0
Kingstonian	2008–09	Isthmian League First Division South	4	0	—		—		3 (Note: 1 appearance in Isthmian League Cup, 1 appearance in Surrey Senior Cup, 1 appearance in London Senior Cup)	0	7	0
Career total			115	9	1	0	0	0	10	1	126	10
