= Stephen Jenkins (footballer) =

English footballer (born 1980)

Personal information
- Full name: Stephen Matthew Jenkins
- Date of birth: 2 January 1980 (age 46)
- Place of birth: Bristol, England
- Height: 1.85 m (6 ft 1 in)
- Position: Defender

Youth career
- 1996–1998: Southampton

Senior career*
Years	Team	Apps	(Gls)
1998–1999	Southampton	0	(0)
1999	→ Brentford (loan)	1	(0)
1999–2000	Brentford	5	(0)
2001–2003	Forest Green Rovers	84	(2)
2003–2004	Bath City	38	(1)
2004–2005	Weston-super-Mare	35	(2)
- * Club domestic league appearances and goals

Stephen Matthew Jenkins (born 2 January 1980) is an English retired footballer who played as a central defender. He began his career as a youth at Southampton, before transferring to Brentford in 1999. After his release in 2000, Jenkins embarked on a short career in non-league football.

== Playing career ==
=== Southampton ===
A left-sided central defender, Jenkins began his career in the Centre of Excellence at Premier League club Southampton and signed a professional contract in January 1998. He failed to make a first team appearance for the club and was released at the end of the 1998–99 season.

=== Brentford ===
Jenkins joined Third Division high-flyers Brentford on loan on 26 March 1999. He went straight onto the substitutes' bench for the following game against Hartlepool United on 3 April and made his professional debut when he came on as an 85th-minute substitute for Andy Scott during the 1–0 win. Late in April, Jenkins suffered a season-ending injury and returned to Southampton.

Jenkins rejoined newly-promoted Brentford on a one-year contract in July 1999. A thigh injury suffered by left back Ijah Anderson in October 1999 allowed Jenkins to break into the team. He made his first Brentford start in a 1–0 win at Notts County on 26 October, playing the full 90 minutes. Jenkins managed just three further appearances before suffering a season-ending injury. He was released at the end of the 1999–00 season and made just seven appearances during his two spells at Griffin Park.

=== Forest Green Rovers ===
After taking the 2000–01 season off from football to recover from his injury sustained while at Brentford, Jenkins signed for Conference club Forest Green Rovers during the 2001 off-season. He quickly established himself as the club's first choice left back and scored his first goal for the club in a 2–2 draw at Northwich Victoria on 29 September. Jenkins was present during Rovers' run to the FA Cup first round proper, taking Third Division club Macclesfield Town to a replay which was lost on penalties. He made 38 appearances and scored two goals during the 2001–02 season.

Jenkins was again a first choice during the 2002–03 and 2003–04 seasons, but his time with Rovers ended in October 2003, when financial concerns led to him being released by the club. Jenkins made 87 appearances and scored two goals during his two years with Rovers.

=== Bath City ===
Jenkins joined Southern League Premier Division club Bath City on 3 October 2003. Jenkins was a virtual ever-present until the end of the 2003–04 season and made 25 appearances. He was released at the end of the season.

=== Weston-super-Mare ===
Jenkins signed for Conference South club Weston-super-Mare during the 2004 off-season. He made 35 appearances and scored two goals during the 2004–05 season.

== Career statistics ==
Appearances and goals by club, season and competition
Club	Season	League			FA Cup		League Cup		Other		Total	
Club	Season	Division	Apps	Goals	Apps	Goals	Apps	Goals	Apps	Goals	Apps	Goals
Brentford (loan)	1998–99	Third Division	1	0	—		—		—		1	0
Brentford	1999–00	Second Division	5	0	1	0	0	0	0	0	6	0
Brentford	Total		6	0	1	0	0	0	0	0	7	0
Forest Green Rovers	2001–02	Conference	36	2	2	0	—		0	0	38	2
Forest Green Rovers	2002–03	Conference	37	0	1	0	—		0	0	38	0
Forest Green Rovers	2003–04	Conference	11	0	0	0	—		0	0	11	0
Forest Green Rovers	Total		84	2	3	0	—		0	0	87	2
Bath City	2003–04	Southern League Premier Division	25	0	—		—		0	0	25	0
Weston-super-Mare	2004–05	Conference South	35	2	0	0	—		0	0	35	2
Career total			150	4	4	0	0	0	0	0	154	4
