= Robbie Talbot =

English footballer and coach

Personal information
- Full name: Robert Talbot
- Date of birth: 31 October 1979 (age 47)
- Place of birth: Liverpool, England
- Position: Striker

Youth career
- 1997–1998: Blackpool

Senior career*
Years	Team	Apps	(Gls)
1998–1999	Marine	20	(4)
1999–2001	Burscough	34	(28)
2001–2003	Morecambe	55	(29)
2003–2005	Burton Albion	52	(28)
2005–2008	Droylsden	18	(19)
2008	→ Marine (loan)	0	(0)
2008	Bangor City	4	(1)
2008–2010	Ashton	15	(4)
Total		198	(113)

Managerial career
- 2010–2011: Ashton (assistant)
- * Club domestic league appearances and goals as of 13:53, 20 February 2017 (UTC)

Robert Talbot (born 31 October 1979) born in Liverpool, Merseyside, is an English former professional footballer and coach.

== Playing career ==
Between the years of 1999–2005, Robbie Talbot was regarded as one of the top strikers in non league football. After completing 12 months in the Rochdale youth team during 1997, Talbot first started his senior career with Marine in 1998, before signing for Burscough in July 1999, following his most successful spells for Morecambe which he was purchased for £9,000 and Burton Albion. As a prolific Conference striker whose birthday was also on Halloween, Morecambe fans often referred to Talbot as the 'Halloween Hitman'.

[4]

In 2003, Nigel Clough signed Talbot for Burton Albion for a fee of £7,000 from Morecambe, where he went on to score 28 times in 52 appearances. During this spell Talbot also included a career milestone of achieving a double Hat-Trick during the 8-0 drubbing of Midland Alliance side Alvechurch in the second round of the Birmingham Senior Cup. During his time with Burton Albion, Talbot was unfortunately involved in a serious car accident in the summer of 2004 which almost ended his life. Talbot eventually recovered from the injuries he sustained over time and made only a few limited appearances for Burton Albion before deciding to join Droylsden in 2005 and then Bangor City in August 2008, where he spent only a month before making his final transfer as a player to Ashton. Here Talbot retired as a player towards the end of the 2009–2010 season with Ashton, due to the persistent injuries that plagued him from the car accident.

== Private Life ==
For 12 months 2024/25 Robbie dated actress Helen Flanagan

== Coaching career ==
During the summer of 2010, Talbot became Assistant manager to Danny Johnson at Ashton. Johnson noted that Talbot's vast experience of playing under excellent managers such as Nigel Clough and Jim Harvey would vastly help the team develop. In 2011, Talbot retired from his role as Assistant Manager at Ashton due to family and work commitments.
