= Nevin Saroya =

English footballer (born 1980)

Personal information
- Date of birth: 15 September 1980 (age 46)
- Place of birth: Hillingdon, England
- Position: Defender

Youth career
- 1998–2000: Brentford

Senior career*
Years	Team	Apps	(Gls)
2000–2001	Brentford	1	(0)
2000	→ Grays Athletic (loan)		
2001	Hampton & Richmond Borough		
2001–2007	Yeading		
2007–2008	Hayes & Yeading United		
2008–2010	Maidenhead United	52	(0)
2009	→ Godalming Town (loan)		
2010–2011	Redlands United		
2011	Maidenhead United	11	(0)
2011–2012	Beaconsfield SYCOB		
2012–2013	Burnham	6	(0)

Managerial career
- 2019–2021: Maidenhead United Women
- * Club domestic league appearances and goals

Nevin Saroya (born 15 September 1980) is an English retired semi-professional footballer who played as a defender, making one appearance in the Football League for Brentford. Saroya also played for non-League clubs Hampton & Richmond Borough, Yeading, Hayes & Yeading United, Godalming Town and Maidenhead United. He also had a spell with Brisbane Premier League club Redlands United.

== Playing career ==
=== Brentford ===
Saroya was born in Hillingdon. He started his career at Brentford as a youth player and after completing his apprenticeship, he signed a professional contract for the club. He made his debut for Brentford in their 1–1 draw in the Football League Second Division with Oxford United on 22 April 2000, replacing Gareth Graham as a substitute in the 46th minute. After Brentford manager-owner Ron Noades released Saroya in 2001, he admitted he became "disillusioned" with football and stopped playing, despite interest from Conference clubs. Saroya was unemployed for six-months, until he was asked by Wally Downes to help the actors in Mean Machine with their fitness and skills; saying "I had always got on well with him [Downes], so he asked me if I would come down here to Yeading and help the actors get fit and show them a few ball skills". Saroya also appeared in the film, and says the other actors and Vinnie Jones "pushed him" to get back into football before an old school friend invited him to train at Yeading.

=== Non-League ===
After a spell at Hampton & Richmond Borough, he signed for Yeading in the summer of 2001. In 2003, he captained Yeading in the Isthmian League Cup and a year later, to win the Isthmian League Division One North. Saroya played in Yeading's lucrative FA Cup third round tie against Newcastle United on 9 January 2005 at Loftus Road, where they were defeated 2–0. He signed an extension to his contract in May 2007, after double-hernia operation. Following the merger of Hayes & Yeading United, Saroya started the club's first season in the Conference South before being released in December 2008. He joined Maidenhead United in December 2008, after a spell at Godalming Town. Saroya left Maidenhead United in April 2010, to play for Australian club Redlands United in the Brisbane Premier League for six-months, having found out about the opportunity after joining a group on Facebook. He returned to Maidenhead United in 2011, but resigned his contract on 1 December 2011 and signed for Beaconsfield SYCOB. Saroya left a year later to join Southern League Division One Central side Burnham. He retired at the end of the 2012–13 season.

== Coaching career ==
After retiring as a player, Saroya served as manager of Maidenhead United Women between 2019 and 2021. He took up the role of a Regional Coach with the PFA in September 2021.

== Personal life ==
Whilst playing semi-professional football, Saroya also worked as a courier.

== Filmography ==
Year	Title	Role	Director(s)
2001	Mean Machine	Prisoners footballer	Barry Skolnick
