= Dean Clark (footballer) =

English footballer (born 1980)

Personal information
- Full name: Dean Wayne Clark
- Date of birth: 31 March 1980 (age 46)
- Place of birth: Hillingdon, Middlesex, England
- Height: 6 ft 1 in (1.85 m)
- Positions: Midfielder; centre forward

Youth career
- 1988–1997: Brentford

Senior career*
Years	Team	Apps	(Gls)
1997–2000	Brentford	5	(0)
2000–2001	Uxbridge	30	(4)
2001–2002	Hayes	41	(13)
2002–2003	Woking	6	(0)
2003–2007	Northwood	83	(36)
2007–2009	AFC Hayes	?	(?)
2009	Beaconsfield SYCOB	6	(2)
2009–2010	Slough Town	11	(2)
2010	AFC Hayes	?	(?)
2010–2011	Uxbridge	?	(?)
- * Club domestic league appearances and goals

Dean Clark (born 31 March 1980) is a retired footballer. He was originally a professional who made a handful of appearances for Brentford and then went on to play for a variety of teams local to north and west London, including making over one hundred appearances for Northwood.

== Football career ==
=== Brentford ===
Clark began his career at Brentford at the age of eight. He made his Football League debut against Luton Town in January 1998. He made four appearances overall and was loaned for three months to Uxbridge in December 1999.

=== Hayes ===
Whilst at Hayes, Clark scored a penalty kick against Wycombe Wanderers televised on Sky Sports. He scored in the forty third minute giving Hayes a 2–1 lead, however they would go on to lose 4–3. His final game for Hayes was a start in the 2–0 loss at home against Boston United on 28 April 2002, in the Football Conference.

Clark was named in a squad for the England national football C team (formerly known as the England semi-pro national team) match against the Isthmian League representative XI on 21 November 2001.

=== Northwood ===
He played for Northwood in three spells, appearing for Windsor & Eton, Maidenhead United and Wealdstone between his appearances for The Woods. In his appearances, he would twice win the Northwood Golden Boot for top goalscorers, in the 2004–05 and 2005–06 seasons and made over one hundred appearances across five seasons, scoring 43 goals in both league and cup appearances before transferring to AFC Hayes in November 2007.

=== AFC Hayes ===
Whilst at AFC Hayes, Clark played in the Middlesex Senior Cup final 2–0 victory over Hendon. He was noted as having one particular chance to score when a sliced clearance from Hendon goalkeeper William Viner fell to his feet, however the keeper redeemed himself with a save described as "brilliant". Clark resigned for AFC Hayes briefly in 2010.

=== Slough Town ===
Clark made his début for Slough Town in the 2–2 draw against Romulus on 12 December 2009. He was brought on as a substitute having started on the bench. With six minutes to go, he crossed a free-kick into the box for Chris Herron to volley in an equaliser.

=== Uxbridge ===
Dean returned for a second stint at Uxbridge, transferring from AFC Hayes on 30 September 2010.

=== BAA Heathrow (Sunday) FC ===
Dean enjoyed a very successful Sunday Football career playing for BAA Heathrow (Sunday) FC in the Hayes & District League and the Thames Valley Sunday Football League. He was a part of the club's golden generation that won numerous trophies under the management of Mick Murray. His first season with the club was 2004–05, which saw the team win the treble of the Hayes & District Premier Division Championship, Premier Division Cup and Presidents Cup. The team disbanded the following season only to return for the 2006–07 season, when they won the TVSFL Division title despite joining the league late and overtaking Old Windsor FC. They also made it to three cup finals, winning two of them. His most successful season though was 2007–08, when the team won the Hayes & District Premier Division title, President's Cup and the Middlesex Sunday Intermediate Cup, and Dean finished as top goal scorer.
