= Scott Marshall (footballer) =

Scottish footballer (born 1973)

Personal information
- Full name: Scott Roderick Marshall
- Date of birth: 1 May 1973 (age 53)
- Place of birth: Edinburgh, Scotland
- Height: 6 ft 1 in (1.85 m)
- Position: Defender

Youth career
- Tynecastle Boys Club
- 1989–1991: Arsenal

Senior career*
Years	Team	Apps	(Gls)
1991–1998	Arsenal	25	(1)
1993–1994	→ Rotherham United (loan)	10	(1)
1994	→ Oxford United (loan)	0	(0)
1994	→ Sheffield United (loan)	17	(0)
1998–1999	Southampton	2	(0)
1999	→ Celtic (loan)	1	(0)
1999–2003	Brentford	75	(3)
2003–2004	Wycombe Wanderers	8	(0)
Total		138	(5)

International career
1994–1996	Scotland U21	5	(1)

Managerial career
- 2015: Aston Villa (caretaker)
- 2018: Reading (caretaker)
- 2023: Colchester United (caretaker)
- * Club domestic league appearances and goals

Scott Roderick Marshall (born 1 May 1973) is a Scottish football coach and former professional footballer.

As a player, he was a defender who notably played in the Premier League for Arsenal and Southampton and in the Scottish Premiership for Celtic. He also played in the Football League for Rotherham United, Oxford United, Sheffield United, Brentford and Wycombe Wanderers. He was capped at Scotland U16, U18 and U21 level.

Following retirement, he returned to Brentford as a youth team coach before running the Arsenal soccer school in Oman. He moved on to Norwich City as the head coach of their under-21s before joining the coaching staff at Aston Villa. In 2015 he had a spell as caretaker manager, a role he repeated during his time at Reading three years later.

He was appointed as assistant manager of Swindon Town in July 2021 before leaving alongside Ben Garner to become assistant coach at Charlton Athletic in June 2022.

In March 2023, Garner was named head coach at Colchester United and appointed Marshall as his assistant coach.

== Playing career ==
Marshall started his playing career at Arsenal and broke into their first team at the age of 19, winning five Scotland under-21 caps. He scored his only goal for the Gunners in their 2–0 victory over Newcastle United in March 1996 and at the end of that season was voted as Arsenal's Young Player of the Year by the supporters.

In seven seasons with Arsenal he only made 27 appearances, spending spells on loan at Rotherham United, Oxford United and Sheffield United. He made three league appearances as Arsenal won the 1997-98 Premier League, however this was not enough to qualify for a winners' medal.

In August 1998, Dave Jones signed him for Southampton on a free transfer. Saints thought they had made a transfer coup, but Marshall soon showed why Arsenal let him go, scoring an own goal in his debut against Leeds United in a 3–0 defeat on 8 September 1998, repeating this four days later in a 4–0 defeat at Newcastle United.

He never appeared again for Saints and went out on loan to Celtic, where his only appearance was in an Old Firm derby with Rangers in May 1999. Marshall ended up on the wrong end of a 3–0 scoreline, a game which saw Celtic's bitter rivals win the league at Celtic Park. This meant that Marshall had featured in just three league games in the 1998–99 season (two for Southampton and one for Celtic), had lost all three and had conceded ten goals.

Marshall then joined Brentford in October 1999 for a fee of £250,000. Unfortunately, after scoring yet another own goal in his third appearance for the Bees, he then suffered back problems which caused him to miss most of the 2001–02 season. After battling his way back to fitness, he at last gained regular first team football making a total of 94 appearances for the Bees, scoring seven goals. Marshall was released at the end of the 2002–03 season.

In November 2003, he became Tony Adams' first signing as Wycombe Wanderers manager. At the end of the 2003–04 season, he was re-signed on a non-contract basis, but on 27 August 2004 he announced his retirement from the professional game.

== Coaching career ==
Marshall took up a youth coaching role at Brentford in September 2007. He spent time living and working in Muscat, in the Sultanate of Oman, running the Arsenal Soccer School. He worked alongside Paul Lambert at Wycombe Wanderers before accepting the position as U-21 development squad head coach at Premier League side Norwich City in the summer of 2012. He was appointed coach at Aston Villa in June 2013, following Lambert's appointment as Villa manager. After Lambert was sacked on 11 February 2015, Scott Marshall and his namesake Andy Marshall were appointed as caretaker managers. They took charge of one game, a 2–1 win against Leicester City in the 2014–15 FA Cup. Marshall left Aston Villa on 17 February 2015, following the managerial appointment of Tim Sherwood.

On 1 September 2017, Marshall joined Reading as manager of the U23 team. On 6 December 2018, Marshall was appointed caretaker manager of the first team, following the dismissal of Paul Clement, but was replaced on 22 December 2018 when José Manuel Gomes took on the role of head coach.

On 22 July 2021, Marshall was appointed as assistant manager at Swindon Town alongside newly appointed head coach Ben Garner.

On 23 June 2022, following Ben Garner being named as head coach, Marshall was named assistant coach of Charlton Athletic before leaving on 4 March 2023.

On 6 March 2023, Marshall was once again reunited with Ben Garner at Colchester United after being named as assistant head coach. Following Garner's sacking in October 2023, Matty Etherington was named interim manager. However following a contractual uncertainties regarding Etherington's former club Crawley Town, Marshall was appointed caretaker manager on 27 October 2023, until the situation was resolved, and Etherington reinstated, four days later.

On 11 July 2025, Marshall returned to Reading as Assistant First Team Manager to Noel Hunt.

On 28 October 2025, Marshall left Reading after Noel Hunt was sacked.

== Personal life ==
Marshall attended Craigmount High School. He is the son of former Hearts and England under-23 goalkeeper Gordon Marshall, the brother of Gordon Jnr. who played in goal for Celtic and Scotland, and his sister Lesley represented Scotland at basketball. As of 2002, he lived in Dorking.

== Managerial statistics ==
As of 22 December 2018

Managerial record by team and tenure
Team	From	To	Record				
Team	From	To	G	W	D	L	Win %
Aston Villa (caretaker)	11 February 2015	15 February 2015	1	1	0	0	100.00
Reading (caretaker)	6 December 2018	22 December 2018	3	0	1	2	0.00
Total			4	1	1	2	25.00

== Honours ==
- Arsenal FC Young Player of the Year: 1996.
