= Gareth Graham =

Northern Irish footballer (born 1978)

Personal information
- Full name: Gareth Lee Graham
- Date of birth: 6 December 1978 (age 47)
- Place of birth: Belfast, Northern Ireland
- Height: 5 ft 7 in (1.70 m)
- Positions: Midfielder; right back

Youth career
- Dungoyne Boys
- Glentoran
- –1997: Crystal Palace

Senior career*
Years	Team	Apps	(Gls)
1997–1999	Crystal Palace	1	(0)
1998	→ Merthyr Tydfil (loan)	3	(0)
1999	→ Brentford (loan)	0	(0)
1999–2001	Brentford	14	(0)
1999	→ Crawley Town (loan)	3	(0)
2001	Woking	6	(0)
2001–2002	Margate	26	(1)
2002	ÍBV	7	(1)
2002–2003	Whyteleafe	22	(2)
2003–2005	AFC Wimbledon	38	(2)
2004	→ Whyteleafe (loan)	4	(0)
2005–2006	Whyteleafe	19	(2)
2006–2007	Croydon Athletic	27	(5)
2007	Cray Wanderers	20	(0)
2007	Kingstonian	2	(0)
2007–2008	Croydon Athletic	16	(1)
2008	Leatherhead	16	(0)
2008–2009	Chertsey Town	18	(2)
2009–2010	Chipstead	14	(1)
2010	Whyteleafe	12	(1)
2010	Warlingham (dual-registration)	2	(1)
2010–2011	Croydon	24	(2)
2011	Merstham	18	(0)
2011–2014	Lingfield	67	(13)
2012–2013	→ AFC Croydon Athletic (dual-registration)	2	(0)
Total		378	(34)

International career
1999	Northern Ireland U21	5	(0)
- * Club domestic league appearances and goals

Gareth Lee Graham (born 6 December 1978) is a Northern Irish retired footballer who played as a midfielder or right back. He began his career in the Football League at Crystal Palace before transferring to Brentford in 1999. Upon his release from Brentford, Graham embarked on a nomadic career in non-League football. He represented Northern Ireland U21 at the international level. He was known by the nickname "Ginge".

== Club career ==
=== Crystal Palace ===
Graham began his career in his native Northern Ireland with Dungoyne Boys and Glentoran before moving to England to join the youth system at Crystal Palace. He reached the final of the FA Youth Cup and won the Southern Junior Floodlit Cup with the youth team during the 1996–97 season and also made his debut for the reserve team. Graham signed his first professional contract in March 1997 and broke into the reserve team during the early part of the 1997–98 season.

A broken leg suffered in a Surrey Senior Cup match for the reserve team in late 1997 hampered Graham's progress. Graham returned to match play with the reserve team early in the 1998–99 season, and to regain fitness, Graham and teammate Andy Martin joined Southern League Premier Division club Merthyr Tydfil on loan in December 1998. He made his Crystal Palace debut away to Watford on 24 April 1999, as a substitute for Steven Thomson after 77 minutes of the 2–1 defeat. Graham failed to receive a call into the first team during the early months of the 1999–00 season and departed the club in October 1999.

=== Brentford ===
Graham joined Second Division club Brentford on loan on 28 September 1999 and the move was made permanent on 6 October. Following a loan at Southern League Premier Division club Crawley Town, Graham made his Brentford debut on 18 December, as a late substitute for Martin Rowlands in a 1–0 defeat to Wigan Athletic. Graham broke into the team on a regular basis in March 2000 and finished the 1999–2000 season with 13 appearances.

Graham was out of favour under new manager Ray Lewington during the 2000–01 season, but a buildup of games in hand (due to bad weather and Brentford's run to the 2001 Football League Trophy Final) saw the squad stretched during the second half of the season, and Graham was a regular unused substitute. He made his only appearance of the season as a late substitute for Jay Tabb in a 2–2 draw with Luton Town on 3 May 2001. Graham was released at the end of the 2000–01 season, after making just 14 appearances during his time with the Bees.

=== Non-League football ===
Aside from a spell in Iceland with Úrvalsdeild club ÍBV in 2002, Graham played in non-League football between 2001 and his retirement in 2014. He played the majority of his football in the Isthmian and Combined Counties leagues, and his most notable spell was with AFC Wimbledon, with whom he won consecutive promotions during the 2003–04 and 2004–05 seasons. He had two spells with Croydon Athletic and four with Whyteleafe and captained both clubs. His last club was Lingfield, for whom he made the final appearance of his career early in the 2014–15 season.

== International career ==
Graham won five caps for Northern Ireland at U21 level. He made his debut in a 1–1 1999 International Triangular Tournament draw with Scotland on 4 June 1999. He made three appearances during Northern Ireland's unsuccessful 2000 European U21 Championship qualifying campaign, and the last of his caps came in a 2–1 defeat to Finland on 8 October 1999.

== Personal life ==
Graham was born in Belfast, Northern Ireland. He lives in Croydon and works in film, media, and entertainment insurance. He is a Tottenham Hotspur supporter.

== Career statistics ==
Appearances and goals by club, season and competition
Club	Season	League			National cup (Note: Includes FA Cup, Icelandic Cup)		League cup (Note: Includes Football League Cup)		Other		Total	
Club	Season	Division	Apps	Goals	Apps	Goals	Apps	Goals	Apps	Goals	Apps	Goals
Crystal Palace	1998–99	First Division	1	0	0	0	0	0	—		1	0
Brentford	1999–2000	Second Division	13	0	0	0	—		0	0	13	0
Brentford	2000–01	Second Division	1	0	0	0	0	0	0	0	1	0
Brentford	Total		14	0	0	0	0	0	0	0	14	0
Crawley Town	1999–2000	Southern League Premier Division	3	0	—		—		—		3	0
ÍBV	2002	Úrvalsdeild	7	1	3	0	—		—		10	1
AFC Wimbledon	2002–03	Combined Counties League	9	0	—		—		—		9	0
AFC Wimbledon	2003–04	Combined Counties League Premier Division	13	2	—		—		3 (Note: 2 appearances in Combined Counties League Premier Challenge Cup, 1 appearance in FA Vase)	0	16	2
AFC Wimbledon	2004–05	Isthmian League First Division	16	0	0	0	—		2 (Note: 1 appearance and 1 goal in Isthmian League Cup, 1 appearance in Surrey Senior Cup)	1	18	1
AFC Wimbledon	Total		38	2	0	0	—		4	1	43	3
Whyteleafe	2005–06	Isthmian League First Division	19	2	0	0	—		0	0	19	2
Croydon Athletic	2006–07	Isthmian League First Division South	19	5	—		—		2 (Note: Appearances in Isthmian League Cup)	2	21	7
Cray Wanderers	2006–07	Isthmian League First Division South	20	0	—		—		—		20	0
Kingstonian	2007–08	Isthmian League First Division South	2	0	0	0	—		1 (Note: Appearance in London Senior Cup)	0	3	0
Croydon Athletic	2007–08	Isthmian League First Division South	13	0	—		—		—		13	0
Croydon Athletic	Total		32	5	0	0	—		2	2	34	7
Leatherhead	2007–08	Isthmian League First Division South	13	0	—		—		—		13	0
Leatherhead	2008–09	Isthmian League First Division South	5	0	—		—		—		5	0
Leatherhead	Total		18	0	—		—		—		18	0
Chertsey Town	2008–09	Combined Counties League Premier Division	18	2	—		—		1 (Note: Appearances in Combined Counties League Premier Challenge Cup)	0	19	2
Chipstead	2009–10	Isthmian League First Division South	16	2	2	1	—		4 (Note: 3 appearances in FA Trophy, 1 appearance in Isthmian League Cup)	0	22	3
Whyteleafe	2009–10	Isthmian League First Division South	7	0	—		—		—		7	0
Whyteleafe	2010–11	Isthmian League First Division South	4	1	1	0	—		—		5	1
Whyteleafe	Total		30	3	1	0	—		0	0	31	3
Warlingham (dual-registration)	2010–11	Combined Counties League First Division	2	1	—		—		—		2	1
Croydon	2010–11	Combined Counties League Premier Division	24	1	—		—		2	0	26	1
Merstham	2010–11	Isthmian League First Division South	8	0	—		—		—		8	0
Merstham	2011–12	Isthmian League First Division South	9	0	0	0	—		1	0	10	0
Merstham	Total		17	0	0	0	—		1	0	18	0
AFC Croydon Athletic	2012–13	Combined Counties League First Division	1	0	—		—		1	0	2	0
Lingfield	2013–14	Sussex County League First Division	26	3	1	0	—		4 (Note: 3 appearances and 1 goal in FA Vase, 1 appearance in Surrey Senior Cup)	1	31	4
Lingfield	2014–15	Southern Counties East League	4	0	0	0	—		0	0	4	0
Lingfield	Total		30	3	1	0	—		4	1	35	4
Career total			292	20	7	1	0	0	20	4	319	25

== Honours ==
AFC Wimbledon

- Isthmian League First Division: 2004–05
- Combined Counties League Premier Division: 2003–04
