= Lee Sidwell =

English footballer (born 1977)

Personal information
- Full name: Lee John Sidwell
- Date of birth: 22 June 1977 (age 49)
- Place of birth: Balham, England
- Position: Central midfielder

Youth career
- –1991: Colliers Wood United
- 1991–1996: Crystal Palace

Senior career*
Years	Team	Apps	(Gls)
1996–1999	Netherne Village (Note: Known as Netherne until 1998)	101	(14)
1999–2001	Chipstead	67	(13)
2001–2002	Netherne Village	20	(1)
2002–2004	AFC Wimbledon	69	(15)
2004–2007	Whyteleafe	98	(11)
2007–2008	Chipstead	31	(3)
2008–2010	Whyteleafe	52	(3)
Total		438	(60)
- * Club domestic league appearances and goals

Lee John Sidwell (born 22 June 1977) is an English former footballer who played as a central midfielder in the Combined Counties League and Isthmian League.

== Career ==
=== Crystal Palace ===
Sidwell began his career with the youth academy of Colliers Wood United before he moved to Crystal Palace in 1991 at the age of fourteen; injuries forced him to leave the club in 1996.

=== First spell at Netherne/Netherne Village ===
He then joined Combined Counties Football League club Netherne during the 1996–97 season, and he left the club when they were forced to drop out of the Combined Counties League in May 1999 as the Netherne C.A.S.C. did not have floodlights.

=== Chipstead ===
Sidwell joined Combined Counties Football League club Chipstead ahead of the 1999–2000 season and he played alongside Netherne Village teammate Danny Oakins. He left in June 2001.

=== Second spell at Netherne Village ===
He rejoined Netherne Village on a one-year deal during the 2001–02 Surrey County Senior League.

=== AFC Wimbledon ===
==== 2002–03 ====
He joined newly formed club AFC Wimbledon ahead of the 2002–03 Combined Counties League season alongside Danny Oakins. He debuted for AFC Wimbledon during their 3–2 win against Enfield Town in the inaugural Supporters Direct Cup on 12 August 2002 in which he also scored, and he also played during the 2–1 win against Sandhurst Town in their first ever league fixture on 17 August 2002. He then scored his first league goal for AFC Wimbledon during a 3–2 victory against Cove on 24 August 2002.

He scored all three goals during the 3–0 victory against Walton Casuals on 26 April 2003, and he won the 2002–03 AFC Wimbledon Player of the Year award as a result of scoring the hat-trick on the same day the voting forms were handed out to supporters.

==== 2003–04 ====
During 2003–04, Sidwell was often a substitute ahead of Andy Sullivan, and he won both the Combined Counties League and the Combined Counties League Premier Challenge Cup with the club.

==== 2004–05 ====
He played two matches for AFC Wimbledon during the 2004–05 season.

After making 84 appearances and scoring 17 goals in all competitions, Sidwell left AFC Wimbledon in September 2004.

=== Two spells at Whyteleafe, and second spell at Chipstead ===
Sidwell joined Whyteleafe in September 2004. He debuted during the 2–0 loss against Molesey on 11 September 2004, and he scored his first goal for Whyteleafe on 9 October 2004 during the 2–1 loss against Leatherhead.

In the 2007–08 season, he rejoined Chipstead and reunited again with Oakins, where he won the Southern Combination Challenge Cup; he was back at Whyteleafe during the following season.

At the age of 32, he would end his footballing career at Whyteleafe during the 2009–10 season.

He played in a Whyteleafe Legends charity match on 18 January 2015.

== Personal life ==
Sidwell has a sister, Louise, and a brother, Steve. Steve was also a footballer between 2001 and 2018, and he spent most of his career playing for clubs in the Premier League.

Aside from being a footballer, he also worked as a scaffolder.

== Career statistics ==
Appearances and goals by club, season and competition
Club	Season	League			FA Cup		Other		Total	
Club	Season	Division	Apps	Goals	Apps	Goals	Apps	Goals	Apps	Goals
Netherne Village	1996–97	Combined Counties Football League	35	4	—		3 (Note: One appearance in FA Vase, two appearances in Surrey Senior Cup)	0	38	4
Netherne Village	1997–98	Combined Counties Football League	34	5	—		3 (Note: One appearance in FA Vase, two appearances in Surrey Senior Cup)	0	37	5
Netherne Village	1998–99	Combined Counties Football League	32	5	—		4 (Note: Two appearances and one goal in FA Vase, two appearances and one goal in Surrey Senior Cup)	1	36	6
Netherne Village	Total		101	14	—		10	1	111	15
Chipstead	1999–2000	Combined Counties Football League	33	6	—		7 (Note: Two appearances and one goal in FA Vase, four appearances and two goals in Combined Counties League Premier Challenge Cup, one appearance in Surrey Senior Cup)	3	40	9
Chipstead	2000–01	Combined Counties Football League	34	7	—		8 (Note: Two appearances in FA Vase, four appearances and two goals in Combined Counties League Premier Challenge Cup, two appearances in Surrey Senior Cup)	3	42	10
Netherne Village	2001–02	Surrey County Senior League	20	1	—		7 (Note: Four appearances in Surrey County Charity Cup, two appearances in Surrey County Premier Challenge Cup, one appearance in unknown)	0	27	1
Netherne Village	Total		77	13	—		22	8	109	20
AFC Wimbledon	2002–03	Combined Counties Football League	41	11	—		8 (Note: Four appearances and one goal in FA Vase, three appearances in Combined Counties League Premier Challenge Cup, one appearance in Surrey Senior Cup)	1	50	13
AFC Wimbledon	2003–04	Combined Counties Football League	28	4	—		5 (Note: One appearance in FA Vase, four appearances and one goal in Combined Counties League Premier Challenge Cup)	1	33	5
AFC Wimbledon	2004–05	Isthmian League Division One	0	0	1	0	1 (Note: One appearance in FA Trophy)	0	2	0
AFC Wimbledon	Total		69	15	1	0	14	3	84	17
Whyteleafe	2004–05	Isthmian League Division One	32	3	1	0	4 (Note: One appearance in FA Trophy, one appearance in Isthmian League Cup, two appearances in Surrey Senior Cup)	0	37	3
Whyteleafe	2005–06	Isthmian League Division One	35	5	2	0	5 (Note: One appearance in FA Trophy, one appearance in Isthmian League Cup, three appearances in Surrey Senior Cup)	1	42	6
Whyteleafe	2006–07	Isthmian League Division One South	31	3	3	0	5 (Note: Two appearances in FA Trophy, one appearance in Isthmian League Cup, two appearances in Surrey Senior Cup)	0	39	3
Chipstead	2007–08	Isthmian League Division One South	31	3	1	0	8 (Note: Two appearances in FA Trophy, one appearance in Isthmian League Cup, four appearances in Southern Combination Challenge Cup)	0	40	3
Whyteleafe	2008–09	Isthmian League Division One South	28	2	1	0	4 (Note: One appearance in FA Trophy, two appearances in Isthmian League Cup, one appearance in Surrey Senior Cup)	0	34	2
Whyteleafe	2009–10	Isthmian League Division One South	24	1	2	0	3 (Note: One appearance in FA Trophy, one appearance in Isthmian League Cup, one appearance in Surrey Senior Cup)	0	29	1
Whyteleafe	Total		181	17	10	0	29	1	221	18
Career total			438	60	11	0	75	10	525	71

== Honours ==
Netherne Village

- Surrey County Charity Cup: runner-up 2001–02

Chipstead

- Southern Combination Challenge Cup: 2007–08

AFC Wimbledon

- Combined Counties Football League: 2003–04, third place 2002–03
- Combined Counties League Premier Challenge Cup: 2003–04
- Supporters Direct Cup: 2003

Individual

- AFC Wimbledon Player of the Year: 2002–03
