= Danny Oakins =

English footballer (born 1980)

Personal information
- Full name: Danny Joe Oakins
- Date of birth: January 1980 (age 46)
- Place of birth: England
- Positions: Central midfielder; centre-back

Team information
- Current team: Lewes (assistant manager)

Youth career
- Chipstead

Senior career*
Years	Team	Apps	(Gls)
1999–2001	Chipstead		
2001–2002	Netherne Village	20	(13)
2002–2004	AFC Wimbledon	76	(19)
2004–2007	Whyteleafe	34+	(2+)
2007–2009	Chipstead	62	(21)
2009–2011	Whyteleafe	21+	(5+)
2010–2011	→ Lingfield (dual registration)		
2011–2015	Lingfield	4+	(4+)
Total		218+	(65+)

Managerial career
- 2022–2023: Chislehurst Glebe (interim)
- 2023–2024: Chislehurst Glebe
- 2024–: Lewes (assistant manager)
- * Club domestic league appearances and goals

Danny Joe Oakins (born January 1980) is an English football manager and former player who played as a central midfielder and as a centre-back. He is currently the assistant manager of Isthmian League Premier Division club Lewes.

== Career ==
Oakins began his career with Chipstead, and he played for Chipstead U18 during their 9–0 loss against Chelsea U18 during the 1997–98 FA Youth Cup first round on 12 September 1997.

He then joined Surrey County Senior League club Netherne alongside Chipstead teammate Lee Sidwell, and Oakins scored thirteen goals during the 2001–02 season.

He joined newly formed club AFC Wimbledon ahead of the 2002–03 Combined Counties League season alongside Lee Sidwell. He debuted during the 2–1 win against Sandhurst Town in their first ever league fixture on 17 August 2002. He then scored his first goal for AFC Wimbledon during the 3–3 draw (5–4 p) against Brimsdown Rovers on 18 September 2002 during the London Senior Cup preliminary round, and he scored six goals during six consecutive matches as he was moved into an attacking role due to an injury crisis.

During 2003–04, he returned to playing as a centre-back, and he won both the Combined Counties League and the Combined Counties League Premier Challenge Cup with the club.

After making 91 appearances and scoring 11 goals in all competitions, Oakins left AFC Wimbledon in September 2004. He joined Whyteleafe with Sidwell and was active during the 2005–06 season.

In the 2007–08 season, he reunited again with Sidwell at their former club Chipstead, and they won the Southern Combination Challenge Cup and Oakins scored sixteen goals.

He then rejoined Whyteleafe in 2009 and he won the Whyteleafe Player of the Season award during the 2009–10 season; he was there until the end of the 2010–11 season.

He ended his career playing for Lingfield initially on a dual registration between 2010 and 2011, and on a permanent deal between 2011 and 2015. He played part of the 5–2 loss against Shoreham on 25 September 2010 as a temporary goalkeeper, and he failed to save a penalty kick. He was also part of the Lingfield team which reached the FA Vase third round for the first time in their history during the 2014–15 season, playing during the 9–2 loss against Colliers Wood United on 6 December 2014.

== Managerial career ==
Oakins was the director of Orpington Rovers between 22 August 2018 and 6 June 2020. He then joined the management side of Chislehurst Glebe and became the interim manager in November 2022; he became a permanent joint-manager alongside Craig Nelson on 30 March 2023. Oakins and Nelson left Chislehurst Glebe on 26 March 2024, and they both joined Lewes on 18 May 2024 where Oakins became the assistant manager.

== Career statistics ==
Appearances and goals by club, season and competition
Club	Season	League			FA Cup		Other		Total	
Club	Season	Division	Apps	Goals	Apps	Goals	Apps	Goals	Apps	Goals
Netherne Village	2001–02	Surrey County Senior League	20	13	—		5 (Note: Three appearances and two goals in Surrey County Charity Cup, one appearance in Surrey County Premier Challenge Cup, one appearance in unknown)	2	25	15
Netherne Village	Total		20	13	—		5	0	25	15
AFC Wimbledon	2002–03	Combined Counties Football League	40	11	—		5 (Note: One appearance and one goals in Combined Counties League Premier Challenge Cup, four appearances and two goals in London Senior Cup)	3	45	14
AFC Wimbledon	2003–04	Combined Counties Football League	36	8	—		11 (Note: Five appearances in FA Vase, six appearances in Combined Counties Football League Challenge Cup)	0	47	8
AFC Wimbledon	2004–05	Isthmian League Division One	0	0	0	0	—		0	0
AFC Wimbledon	Total		76	19	0	0	16	3	92	22
Whyteleafe	2004–05	Isthmian League Division One South	20	1					20+	1+
Whyteleafe	2005–06	Isthmian League Division One South	14	1					14+	1+
Chipstead	2007–08	Isthmian League Division One South	31	16					31+	16+
Chipstead	2008–09	Isthmian League Division One South	31	5					31+	5+
Whyteleafe	2009–10	Isthmian League Division One South		3+						3+
Whyteleafe	2010–11	Isthmian League Division One South	21	2					21+	2+
Lingfield	2010–11	Sussex County League Premier		2+						2+
Lingfield	2012–13	Sussex County League Premier		2+						2+
Lingfield	2014–15	Southern Counties East Football League	4	0	0	0			4	0
Career total			218	65	0	0	21	3	239	68

== Honours ==
=== As a player ===
Netherne Village

- Surrey County Charity Cup: runner-up 2001–02

Chipstead

- Southern Combination Challenge Cup: 2007–08

AFC Wimbledon

- Combined Counties Football League: 2003–04, third place 2002–03
- Combined Counties League Premier Challenge Cup: 2003–04
- Supporters Direct Cup: 2003

Individual

- Whyteleafe Player of the Season: 2009–10

=== As a manager ===
Chislehurst Glebe

- Southern Counties East Football League Premier Division: third place 2023–24
