= List of Dartford F.C. seasons =

Dartford Football Club is an English association football club based in Dartford, Kent. The club participates in the Conference Premier, the fifth tier of English football.

Home matches are played at the club's environmentally friendly stadium, Princes Park, opened in November 2006. The club was formed in 1888 by members of the Dartford Working men's club. Dartford's best performances in the FA Cup came in 1936 and 1937 when they reached the 3rd round of the competition and their best in recent times was when they reached the 1st round in 2010–11 season where they gained a replay. They have also reached the final of the FA Trophy once.

== Key ==
Top scorer and number of goals scored shown in bold when he was also top scorer for the division.

Key to league record

- Level = Level of the league in the current league system
- Pld = Games played
- W = Games won
- D = Games drawn
- L = Games lost
- GF = Goals for
- GA = Goals against
- GD = Goals difference
- Pts = Points
- Position = Position in the final league table

Key to cup records

- PR = Premilinary round
- QR1 = Qualifying round 1
- QR2 = Qualifying round 2
- QR3 = Qualifying round 3
- QR4 = Qualifying round 4
- R1 = Round 1
- R2 = Round 2
- R3 = Round 3
- R4 = Round 4
- R5 = Round 5
- R6 = Round 6
- QF = Quarter-finals
- SF = Semi-finals
- RU = Runners-up
- W = Winners
- Average home attendance = for league games only

== Seasons ==
Year	League	Level	Pld	W	D	L	GF	GA	GD	Pts	Position	Leading league scorer	League goals	FA Cup	FA Trophy	Average league attendance
1992-93	Southern League - Premier Division	7	4	1	1	2	1	2	-1	4	22nd of 22 (resigned from league)	Leo Fortune-West	1	N/A	N/A	531
1993-94	Kent League - First Division	8	40	21	11	8	70	44	26	74	6th of 21	Micky Collins	21	N/A	N/A	315
1994-95	Kent League - First Division	8	40	14	11	15	61	51	10	53	11th of 21	Micky Collins/Ricky Bennett	14	N/A	N/A	297
1995-96	Kent League - First Division	8	38	26	11	1	71	21	50	89	2nd of 20 **Promoted**	Ricky Bennett/Dean Bowey	19	QR1	N/A	332
1996-97	Southern League - Southern Division	7	42	14	10	18	59	64	-3	52	14th of 22	Glenn Payne	13	PR	QR3	322
1997-98	Southern League - Southern Division	7	42	17	7	18	60	60	0	58	11th of 22	Glenn Payne	16	QR2	QR2	236
1998-99	Southern League - Southern Division	7	42	14	10	18	48	53	-5	52	14th of 22	Glenn Payne	8	QL1	R2	236
1999-2000	Southern League - Southern Division	7	42	17	6	19	52	58	-6	57	8th of 22	Lee Guiver	17	PR	R3	222
2000-01	SFL Division One East	7	42	11	11	20	49	67	-18	44	16th of 22	Chris Arnold	21	QR3	R1	178
2001-02	SFL Division One East	7	42	18	5	19	62	66	-4	59	8th of 22	Lee Guiver	10	QR3	R1	296
2002-03	SFL Division One East	7	42	11	8	23	48	78	-30	41	17th of 22	Martin Buglione	10	PR	PR	232
2003–04	SFL Division One East	7	42	13	6	23	48	81	-33	45	16th of 22	Tostao Kwashi	14	QR2	R1	235
2004–05	SFL Division One East	8	42	11	13	18	58	75	−17	46	16th of 22	Tostao Kwashi	24	QR1	R1	260
2005–06	SFL Division One East	8	42	16	13	13	65	57	+8	61	7th of 22; **Transferred**	Ryan Hayes	14	PR	QR3	291
2006–07	IL Division One South	8	42	19	11	12	86	65	+21	68	7th of 22	Brendon Cass	32	QR1	QR2	1032
2007–08	IL Division One North	8	42	27	8	7	107	42	+65	89	1st of 22; **Promoted**	Brendon Cass	37	QR3	QR1	1002
2008–09	IL Premier Division	7	42	17	11	14	62	49	+13	62	8th of 22	Richard O'Reilly	27	QR2	QR3	1065
2009–10	IL Premier Division	7	42	29	6	7	101	45	+56	93	1st of 22; **Promoted**	Lee Burns	23	QR3	QR3	1125
2010–11	Conference South	6	42	15	12	15	60	59	+1	57	10th of 22	Charlie Sheringham	25	R1	R3	1180
2011–12	Conference South	6	42	26	10	6	89	40	+49	88	2nd of 22; **Promoted through PO**	Elliot Bradbrook	15	QR4	R3	1,247
2012–13	Conference National	5	46	19	9	18	67	63	+4	66	8th of 24	Harry Crawford	13	QR4	**SF**	1,364
2013–14	Conference National	5	46	12	8	26	49	74	−25	44	22nd of 24; **Reprieved**	Elliot Bradbrook	9	R1	R1	1,250
2014–15	Conference National	5	46	8	15	23	44	74	−30	39	22nd of 24; **Relegated**	Elliot Bradbrook	8	**R2**	R3	1,112
2015–16	National League South	6	42	16	11	15	58	56	+2	59	8th of 22	Elliot Bradbrook	17	QR2	QR3	1,046
2016–17	National League South	6	42	25	9	8	83	45	+38	84	3rd of 22	Elliot Bradbrook	14	R1	R2	1,002
2017–18	National League South	6	42	26	8	8	81	44	+37	86	2nd of 22	Alfie Pavey	22	R1	R1	1,021
2018–19	National League South	6	42	18	10	14	52	58	-6	64	10th of 22	Charlie Sheringham	9	QR3	QR3	1,134
2019–20	National League South	6	34	16	8	10	60	46	+14	56	6th of 22	Darren McQueen	16	QR4	QR3	1,183 (after 18 of 21 games)
2020–21	National League South	6	19	10	4	5	26	17	+9	34	2nd of 21	Jacob Berkeley-Agyepong	5	QR2	R3	0 (after 12 of 20 games)
2021–22	National League South	6	40	21	11	8	75	42	+33	74	4th of 21	Marcus Dinanga	13	QR4	R5	1,338
2022–23	National League South	6	46	25	8	13	82	50	+32	83	2nd of 24	Alex Wall	11	QR2	R2	1,178
2023–24	National League South	6	46	12	10	24	56	75	-19	46	21st of 24; **Relegated**	Luke Coulson	10	QR2	R2	1,055
2024–25	IL Premier Division	7	42	25	9	8	77	49	+28	84	3rd of 22	Callum Jones	13	QR3	QR3	1,138
2025–26	IL Premier Division	7	42	20	12	10	81	55	+26	72	6th of 22	Olly Box	16	QR1	QR3	1,067
2026–27	IL Premier Division	7	18	12	0	6	32	23	+8	36	3rd of 22	Dan Smith	9	QR3	TBC	1,059 (after 9 of 21 games)
