= 2003–04 Southern Football League =

The 2003–04 Southern Football League season was the 101st in the history of the league, an English football competition.

It was the last season for the Southern Football League as a feeder for the Conference Premier. At the end of the season, the Premier Division was replaced as a level 6 league (along with the Northern Premier League Premier Division and Isthmian League Premier Division) by the newly formed Conference North and Conference South. The Premier Division lost more than half its clubs to newly formed divisions, and the two regional divisions had a number of their clubs promoted to the Premier Division to replace them. Thus, the Southern Football League divisions downgraded to 7-8 levels.

== Premier Division ==
The Premier Division consisted of 22 clubs, including 17 clubs from the previous season and five new clubs:

- Two clubs promoted from the Eastern Division:
  - Dorchester Town
  - Eastbourne Borough
- Two clubs promoted from the Western Division:
  - Merthyr Tydfil
  - Weston-super-Mare
- Plus:
  - Nuneaton Borough, relegated from the Football Conference

Crawley Town won the division and were promoted to the Conference National. Clubs finished higher than 14th position were to transfer to the newly created Conference North and South divisions and clubs finished higher than 18th position plus winners of divisions One were to participate in the play-offs for a two final spots in Conference North/South.

There were no relegation from the Premier Division this season, though, due to league reform, clubs remained in the division downgraded from sixth tier to seventh.

=== League table ===
Southern Football League Premier Division
- Season: 2003–04
- Champions: Crawley Town
- Promoted: Crawley Town
- Matches: 462
- Goals: 1,238 (2.68 per match)

| Pos | Team | Pld | W | D | L | GF | GA | GD | Pts | Promotion or relegation |
|---|---|---|---|---|---|---|---|---|---|---|
| 1 | Crawley Town | 42 | 25 | 9 | 8 | 77 | 43 | +34 | 84 | Promoted to the Conference National |
| 2 | Weymouth | 42 | 20 | 12 | 10 | 76 | 47 | +29 | 72 | Qualified for the Conference South |
| 3 | Stafford Rangers | 42 | 19 | 11 | 12 | 55 | 43 | +12 | 68 | Qualified for the Conference North |
| 4 | Nuneaton Borough | 42 | 17 | 15 | 10 | 65 | 49 | +16 | 66 | Qualified for the Conference North |
| 5 | Worcester City | 42 | 18 | 9 | 15 | 71 | 50 | +21 | 63 | Qualified for the Conference North |
| 6 | Hinckley United | 42 | 15 | 14 | 13 | 55 | 46 | +9 | 59 | Qualified for the Conference North |
| 7 | Newport County | 42 | 15 | 14 | 13 | 52 | 50 | +2 | 59 | Qualified for the Conference South |
| 8 | Cambridge City | 42 | 14 | 15 | 13 | 54 | 53 | +1 | 57 | Qualified for the Conference South |
| 9 | Welling United | 42 | 16 | 8 | 18 | 56 | 58 | −2 | 56 | Qualified for the Conference South |
| 10 | Weston-super-Mare | 42 | 14 | 13 | 15 | 52 | 52 | 0 | 55 | Qualified for the Conference South |
| 11 | Eastbourne Borough | 42 | 14 | 13 | 15 | 48 | 56 | −8 | 55 | Qualified for the Conference South |
| 12 | Havant & Waterlooville | 42 | 15 | 10 | 17 | 59 | 70 | −11 | 55 | Qualified for the Conference South |
| 13 | Moor Green | 42 | 14 | 12 | 16 | 42 | 54 | −12 | 54 | Qualified for the Conference North |
| 14 | Merthyr Tydfil | 42 | 13 | 14 | 15 | 60 | 66 | −6 | 53 | Qualified for the play-offs |
| 15 | Tiverton Town | 42 | 12 | 15 | 15 | 63 | 64 | −1 | 51 | Qualified for the play-offs |
| 16 | Bath City | 42 | 13 | 12 | 17 | 49 | 57 | −8 | 51 | Qualified for the play-offs |
| 17 | Dorchester Town | 42 | 14 | 9 | 19 | 56 | 69 | −13 | 51 | Qualified for the play-offs, then qualified to the Conference South |
| 18 | Chelmsford City | 42 | 11 | 16 | 15 | 46 | 53 | −7 | 49 | Qualified for the play-offs, then transferred to the Isthmian League |
| 19 | Dover Athletic | 42 | 12 | 13 | 17 | 50 | 59 | −9 | 49 | Transferred to the Isthmian League |
| 20 | Hednesford Town | 42 | 12 | 12 | 18 | 56 | 69 | −13 | 48 | |
| 21 | Chippenham Town | 42 | 10 | 17 | 15 | 51 | 63 | −12 | 47 | |
| 22 | Grantham Town | 42 | 10 | 15 | 17 | 45 | 67 | −22 | 45 | |

Source: fchd.com rsssf.com
Rules for classification: 1) points; 2) goal difference; 3) number of goals scored.

=== Play-offs ===
Semifinals
16P | Bath City | 2
17P | Dorchester Town | 4
15P | Tiverton Town | 1
18P | Chelmsford City | 0

Final
15P | Tiverton Town | 1
17P | Dorchester Town | 3

Semifinals
1ed | King's Lynn | 0
1wd | Redditch United | 1
14P | Merthyr Tydfil | W/O

Final
14P | Merthyr Tydfil | 0
1wd | Redditch United | 3

=== Stadia and locations ===
Locations of the Premier Division clubs

| Club | Stadium |
|---|---|
| Bath City | Twerton Park |
| Cambridge City | City Ground |
| Chelmsford City | New Lodge (groundshare with Billericay Town) |
| Chippenham Town | Hardenhuish Park |
| Crawley Town | Broadfield Stadium |
| Dorchester Town | The Avenue Stadium |
| Dover Athletic | Crabble Athletic Ground |
| Eastbourne Borough | Priory Lane |
| Grantham Town | South Kesteven Sports Stadium |
| Havant & Waterlooville | West Leigh Park |
| Hednesford Town | Keys Park |
| Hinckley United | Middlefield Lane |
| Merthyr Tydfil | Penydarren Park |
| Moor Green | The Moorlands |
| Newport County | Newport Stadium |
| Nuneaton Borough | Liberty Way |
| Stafford Rangers | Marston Road |
| Tiverton Town | Ladysmead |
| Welling United | Park View Road |
| Weston-super-Mare | Woodspring Park |
| Weymouth | Bob Lucas Stadium |
| Worcester City | St Georges Lane |

== Eastern Division ==
The Eastern Division consisted of 22 clubs, including 18 clubs from the previous season and four new clubs:

- Two clubs relegated from the Premier Division:
  - Hastings United
  - Folkestone Invicta
- Plus:
  - Burgess Hill Town, promoted from the Sussex County League
  - Eastleigh, promoted from the Wessex League

=== League table ===
Southern Football League Eastern Division
- Season: 2003–04
- Champions: King's Lynn
- Matches: 462
- Goals: 1,359 (2.94 per match)

| Pos | Team | Pld | W | D | L | GF | GA | GD | Pts | Promotion or relegation |
|---|---|---|---|---|---|---|---|---|---|---|
| 1 | King's Lynn | 42 | 28 | 7 | 7 | 90 | 35 | +55 | 91 | Qualified for the play-offs, then promoted to the Premier Division |
| 2 | Histon | 42 | 26 | 10 | 6 | 96 | 41 | +55 | 88 | Promoted to the Premier Division |
| 3 | Tonbridge Angels | 42 | 27 | 7 | 8 | 82 | 46 | +36 | 88 | Promoted to the Isthmian League Premier Division |
| 4 | Eastleigh | 42 | 27 | 4 | 11 | 88 | 40 | +48 | 82 (Note: Eastleigh were deducted three points) | Promoted to the Isthmian League Premier Division |
| 5 | Folkestone Invicta | 42 | 20 | 15 | 7 | 91 | 45 | +46 | 75 | Promoted to the Isthmian League Premier Division |
| 6 | Salisbury City | 42 | 21 | 11 | 10 | 73 | 45 | +28 | 74 | Promoted to the Isthmian League Premier Division |
| 7 | Stamford | 42 | 20 | 11 | 11 | 63 | 45 | +18 | 71 | Promoted to the Premier Division |
| 8 | Banbury United | 42 | 19 | 10 | 13 | 65 | 57 | +8 | 67 | Promoted to the Premier Division |
| 9 | Burgess Hill Town | 42 | 19 | 7 | 16 | 67 | 54 | +13 | 64 | Transferred to the Isthmian League Division One |
| 10 | Sittingbourne | 42 | 18 | 8 | 16 | 61 | 55 | +6 | 62 | |
| 11 | Bashley | 42 | 18 | 7 | 17 | 66 | 58 | +8 | 61 | Transferred to the Isthmian League Division One |
| 12 | Ashford Town (Kent) | 42 | 15 | 9 | 18 | 51 | 53 | −2 | 54 | Transferred to the Isthmian League Division One |
| 13 | Chatham Town | 42 | 13 | 10 | 19 | 49 | 67 | −18 | 49 | |
| 14 | Fisher Athletic | 42 | 13 | 10 | 19 | 61 | 81 | −20 | 49 | |
| 15 | Corby Town | 42 | 12 | 9 | 21 | 44 | 75 | −31 | 45 | Transferred to the Western Division |
| 16 | Dartford | 42 | 13 | 6 | 23 | 48 | 81 | −33 | 45 | |
| 17 | Burnham | 42 | 12 | 11 | 19 | 52 | 76 | −24 | 44 (Note: Burnham were deducted three points) | Transferred to the Western Division |
| 18 | Hastings United | 42 | 12 | 7 | 23 | 60 | 91 | −31 | 43 | Transferred to the Isthmian League Division One |
| 19 | Newport (Isle of Wight) | 42 | 11 | 7 | 24 | 42 | 69 | −27 | 40 | Transferred to the Isthmian League Division One |
| 20 | Rothwell Town | 42 | 9 | 11 | 22 | 30 | 47 | −17 | 38 | Transferred to the Western Division |
| 21 | Erith & Belvedere | 42 | 7 | 10 | 25 | 45 | 84 | −39 | 31 | |
| 22 | Fleet Town | 42 | 5 | 7 | 30 | 35 | 114 | −79 | 22 | Transferred to the Isthmian League Division One |

Source: fchd.com rsssf.com
Rules for classification: 1) points; 2) goal difference; 3) number of goals scored.

=== Stadia and locations ===
Locations of the Eastern Division clubs

| Club | Stadium |
|---|---|
| Ashford Town (Kent) | The Homelands |
| Banbury United | Spencer Stadium |
| Bashley | Bashley Road |
| Burgess Hill Town | Leylands Park |
| Burnham | The Gore |
| Chatham Town | The Sports Ground |
| Corby Town | Steel Park |
| Dartford | Stonebridge Road (groundshare with Gravesend & Northfleet) |
| Eastleigh | Ten Acres |
| Erith & Belvedere | Park View Road (groundshare with Welling United) |
| Fleet Town | Calthorpe Park |
| Folkestone Invicta | Cheriton Road |
| Fisher Athletic | Champion Hill (groundshare with Dulwich Hamlet) |
| Hastings United | The Pilot Field |
| Histon | Bridge Road |
| King's Lynn | The Walks |
| Newport (Isle of Wight) | St Georges Park |
| Rothwell Town | Cecil Street |
| Salisbury City | Raymond McEnhill Stadium |
| Sittingbourne | Bourne Park |
| Stamford | Hanson's Field |
| Tonbridge Angels | Longmead Stadium |

== Western Division ==
The Western Division consisted of 22 clubs, including 18 clubs from the previous season and four new clubs:

- Two clubs relegated from the Premier Division:
  - Halesowen Town
  - Ilkeston Town
- Plus:
  - Team Bath, promoted from the Western League
  - Yate Town, promoted from the Hellenic League

=== League table ===
Southern Football League Western Division
- Season: 2003–04
- Champions: Redditch United
- Matches: 420
- Goals: 1,166 (2.78 per match)

| Pos | Team | Pld | W | D | L | GF | GA | GD | Pts | Promotion or relegation |
|---|---|---|---|---|---|---|---|---|---|---|
| 1 | Redditch United | 40 | 25 | 9 | 6 | 75 | 30 | +45 | 84 | Qualified for the play-offs, then promoted to the Conference North |
| 2 | Gloucester City | 40 | 24 | 7 | 9 | 77 | 46 | +31 | 79 | Promoted to the Premier Division |
| 3 | Cirencester Town | 40 | 24 | 4 | 12 | 73 | 40 | +33 | 76 | Promoted to the Premier Division |
| 4 | Halesowen Town | 40 | 20 | 13 | 7 | 64 | 40 | +24 | 73 | Promoted to the Premier Division |
| 5 | Rugby United | 40 | 21 | 8 | 11 | 57 | 40 | +17 | 71 | Promoted to the Premier Division |
| 6 | Team Bath | 40 | 21 | 6 | 13 | 62 | 41 | +21 | 69 | Promoted to the Premier Division |
| 7 | Solihull Borough | 40 | 19 | 9 | 12 | 50 | 31 | +19 | 66 | Promoted to the Premier Division |
| 8 | Sutton Coldfield Town | 40 | 16 | 15 | 9 | 52 | 38 | +14 | 63 | |
| 9 | Bromsgrove Rovers | 40 | 16 | 11 | 13 | 60 | 48 | +12 | 59 | |
| 10 | Ilkeston Town | 40 | 16 | 10 | 14 | 58 | 59 | −1 | 58 | Transferred to the Northern Premier League Division One |
| 11 | Clevedon Town | 40 | 16 | 5 | 19 | 55 | 59 | −4 | 53 | |
| 12 | Gresley Rovers | 40 | 15 | 7 | 18 | 52 | 60 | −8 | 52 | Transferred to the Northern Premier League Division One |
| 13 | Mangotsfield United | 40 | 14 | 8 | 18 | 70 | 70 | 0 | 50 | |
| 14 | Evesham United | 40 | 15 | 5 | 20 | 56 | 57 | −1 | 50 | |
| 15 | Taunton Town | 40 | 14 | 8 | 18 | 50 | 55 | −5 | 50 | |
| 16 | Yate Town | 40 | 11 | 9 | 20 | 51 | 79 | −28 | 42 | |
| 17 | Swindon Supermarine | 40 | 10 | 9 | 21 | 41 | 69 | −28 | 39 | |
| 18 | Stourport Swifts | 40 | 9 | 11 | 20 | 43 | 62 | −19 | 38 | |
| 19 | Bedworth United | 40 | 8 | 12 | 20 | 39 | 61 | −22 | 36 | |
| 20 | Cinderford Town | 40 | 7 | 9 | 24 | 50 | 94 | −44 | 30 | |
| 21 | Shepshed Dynamo | 40 | 5 | 13 | 22 | 31 | 87 | −56 | 28 | Transferred to the Northern Premier League Division One |
| 22 | Atherstone United | 0 | 0 | 0 | 0 | 0 | 0 | 0 | 0 | Club folded |

Source: fchd.com rsssf.com
Rules for classification: 1) points; 2) goal difference; 3) number of goals scored.

=== Stadia and locations ===
Locations of the Western Division clubs

| Club | Stadium |
|---|---|
| Atherstone Town | Sheepy Road |
| Bedworth United | The Oval |
| Bromsgrove Rovers | Victoria Ground |
| Cinderford Town | Causeway Ground |
| Cirencester Town | Corinium Stadium |
| Gloucester City | Meadow Park, Gloucester |
| Clevedon Town | Hand Stadium |
| Evesham United | Common Road |
| Gresley Rovers | Moat Ground |
| Halesowen Town | The Grove |
| Ilkeston Town | New Manor Ground |
| Mangotsfield United | Cossham Street |
| Redditch United | The Valley |
| Rugby Town | Butlin Road |
| Shepshed Dynamo | The Dovecote Stadium |
| Solihull Borough | Damson Park |
| Stourport Swifts | Walshes Meadow |
| Sutton Coldfield Town | The Central Ground |
| Swindon Supermarine | Hunts Copse Ground |
| Taunton Town | Wordsworth Drive |
| Team Bath | Twerton Park (groundshare with Bath City) |
| Yate Town | Lodge Road |

== See also ==
- Southern Football League
- 2003–04 Isthmian League
- 2003–04 Northern Premier League
