= 2004–05 Isthmian League =

The 2004–05 season was the 90th in the history of the Isthmian League, which is an English football competition featuring semi-professional and amateur clubs from London, East and South East England.

Also, it was the first season after the creation of the Conference North and South, one step above the Isthmian League. Therefore, it was the inaugural season for the league in the seventh, eighth and ninth tiers of the English league system.

== Premier Division ==
Isthmian League Premier Division
- Season: 2004–05
- Champions: Yeading
- Promoted: Eastleigh; Yeading
- Relegated: Dover Athletic; Kingstonian; Tonbridge Angels
- Matches: 462
- Goals: 1,302 (2.82 per match)
- Top goalscorer: 29 goals – Carl Griffiths (Heybridge Swifts)
- Highest attendance: 2,390 – Dover Athletic – Folkestone Invicta, (28 March)
- Total attendance: 149,301
- Average attendance: 323 (-12.5% to previous season)

After the creation of the Conference North and South, placed above the Isthmian League before the start of the season most of the Premier Division clubs were transferred to the newly created divisions.

The Premier Division featured seven clubs from the previous season and 15 new clubs:

- Seven clubs remained in the league:
  - Billericay Town
  - Braintree Town
  - Harrow Borough
  - Hendon
  - Heybridge Swifts
  - Kingstonian
  - Northwood
- Four clubs promoted from Division One North:
  - Cheshunt
  - Leyton
  - Wealdstone
  - Yeading
- Five clubs promoted from Division One South:
  - Hampton & Richmond Borough
  - Slough Town
  - Staines Town
  - Windsor & Eton
  - Worthing
- Two clubs transferred from the Southern Football League Premier Division:
  - Chelmsford City
  - Dover Athletic
- Four clubs promoted from the Southern Football League Eastern Division:
  - Eastleigh
  - Folkestone Invicta
  - Salisbury City
  - Tonbridge Angels

Yeading won the division and were promoted to the Conference South along with play-off winners Eastleigh. Tonbridge Angels, Dover Athletic and Kingstonian finished bottom of the table and were relegated to Division One, while 19th-placed Cheshunt were reprieved as the club with a better record than the equivalent Northern Premier League and Southern League clubs after Conference South side Hornchurch folded.

=== League table ===
Pos	Team	Pld	W	D	L	GF	GA	GD	Pts	Promotion or relegation
1	Yeading	42	25	11	6	74	48	+26	86	Promoted to the Conference South
2	Billericay Town	42	23	11	8	78	40	+38	80	Qualified for the play-offs
3	Eastleigh	42	22	13	7	84	49	+35	79	Qualified for the play-offs, then promoted to the Conference South
4	Braintree Town	42	19	17	6	67	33	+34	74	Qualified for the play-offs
5	Leyton	42	21	8	13	71	57	+14	71	Qualified for the play-offs
6	Hampton & Richmond	42	21	8	13	64	53	+11	71	
7	Heybridge Swifts	42	18	9	15	76	65	+11	63	
8	Chelmsford City	42	17	11	14	63	58	+5	62	
9	Staines Town	42	17	9	16	59	53	+6	60	
10	Worthing	42	16	11	15	50	45	+5	59	
11	Hendon	42	17	7	18	48	60	−12	58	
12	Salisbury City	42	16	9	17	60	64	−4	57	Transferred to the SFL Premier Division
13	Slough Town	42	15	10	17	61	66	−5	55	
14	Folkestone Invicta	42	14	10	18	51	53	−2	52	
15	Windsor & Eton	42	12	14	16	48	62	−14	50	
16	Harrow Borough	42	13	10	19	41	54	−13	49	
17	Northwood	42	14	7	21	49	66	−17	49	Transferred to the SFL Premier Division
18	Wealdstone	42	13	8	21	60	73	−13	47	
19	Cheshunt	42	12	11	19	58	71	−13	47	Reprieved from relegation, then transferred to the SFL Premier Division
20	Tonbridge Angels	42	11	10	21	47	73	−26	43	Relegated to Division One
21	Dover Athletic	42	10	9	23	50	66	−16	39	Relegated to Division One
22	Kingstonian	42	7	5	30	43	93	−50	26	Relegated to Division One

Rules for classification: 1) points; 2) goal difference; 3) number of goals scored.

=== Play-offs ===
Semifinals
2	Billericay Town	0
5	Leyton	2
3	Eastleigh	2
4	Braintree Town	0

Final
3	Eastleigh	2
5	Leyton	1

=== Stadia and locations ===
Locations of the Premier Division clubs
Greater London Premier Division football clubs

Club	Stadium
Billericay Town	New Lodge
Braintree Town	Cressing Road
Chelmsford City	New Lodge (groundshare with Billericay Town)
Cheshunt	Cheshunt Stadium
Dover Athletic	Crabble Athletic Ground
Eastleigh	Ten Acres
Folkestone Invicta	Cheriton Road
Hampton & Richmond Borough	Beveree Stadium
Harrow Borough	Earlsmead Stadium
Hendon	Claremont Road
Heybridge Swifts	Scraley Road
Kingstonian	Kingsmeadow (groundshare with AFC Wimbledon)
Leyton	Leyton Stadium
Northwood	Chestnut Avenue
Salisbury City	Raymond McEnhill Stadium
Slough Town	Stag Meadow (groundshare with Windsor & Eton)
Staines Town	Wheatsheaf Park
Tonbridge Angels	Longmead Stadium
Wealdstone	White Lion (groundshare with Edgware Town)
Windsor & Eton	Stag Meadow
Worthing	Woodside Road
Yeading	The Warren

== Division One ==
Isthmian League Division One
- Season: 2004–05
- Champions: AFC Wimbledon
- Promoted: AFC Wimbledon; Bromley; Walton & Hersham
- Relegated: Croydon; Dorking
- Matches: 462
- Goals: 1,410 (3.05 per match)
- Top goalscorer: 29 goals – Stephen Harper (Burgess Hill Town)
- Highest attendance: 3,358 – AFC Wimbledon – Cray Wanderers, (23 April)
- Total attendance: 168,134
- Average attendance: 364

After the creation of the Conference North and South one step above the Isthmian League, most of the Premier Division clubs were transferred to the newly created divisions. Consequently, the best Division One clubs took up the empty spots in higher divisions. Remaining Division One North clubs were transferred to the Southern Football League. Two Isthmian League Division One sections were merged into single Division One.

Division One consisted of 13 clubs transferred from Division One South and nine new clubs:

- 13 clubs transferred from Division One South:
  - Banstead Athletic
  - Bromley
  - Corinthian Casuals
  - Croydon
  - Croydon Athletic
  - Dulwich Hamlet
  - Horsham
  - Leatherhead
  - Metropolitan Police
  - Molesey
  - Tooting & Mitcham United
  - Walton & Hersham
  - Whyteleafe
- Six clubs transferred from Southern Football League Eastern Division:
  - Ashford Town (Kent)
  - Bashley
  - Burgess Hill Town
  - Fleet Town
  - Hastings United
  - Newport (Isle of Wight)
- Plus:
  - Dorking, promoted from Division Two
  - AFC Wimbledon, promoted from the Combined Counties League
  - Cray Wanderers, promoted from the Kent League

AFC Wimbledon won the division to earn a second promotion in a row along with runners-up Walton & Hersham and play-off winners Bromley. Dorking returned to Division Two along with Croydon.

=== League table ===
Pos	Team	Pld	W	D	L	GF	GA	GD	Pts	Promotion or relegation
1	AFC Wimbledon	42	29	10	3	91	33	+58	97	Promoted to the Premier Division
2	Walton & Hersham	42	28	4	10	69	34	+35	88	Promoted to the Premier Division
3	Horsham	42	24	6	12	90	61	+29	78	Qualified for the play-offs
4	Bromley	42	22	9	11	69	44	+25	75	Qualified for the play-offs, then promoted to the Premier Division
5	Metropolitan Police	42	22	8	12	72	51	+21	74	Qualified for the play-offs
6	Cray Wanderers	42	19	16	7	95	54	+41	73	Qualified for the play-offs
7	Leatherhead	42	20	13	9	73	55	+18	73	
8	Tooting & Mitcham United	42	18	15	9	92	60	+32	69	
9	Whyteleafe	42	20	6	16	60	59	+1	66	
10	Burgess Hill Town	42	19	6	17	73	62	+11	63	
11	Hastings United	42	15	11	16	55	57	−2	56	
12	Croydon Athletic	42	13	16	13	66	65	+1	55	
13	Corinthian-Casuals	42	15	9	18	56	64	−8	54	
14	Bashley	42	13	13	16	68	74	−6	52	
15	Dulwich Hamlet	42	10	14	18	61	64	−3	44	
16	Molesey	42	12	8	22	46	70	−24	44	
17	Banstead Athletic	42	10	10	22	50	64	−14	40	
18	Newport (Isle of Wight)	42	10	10	22	50	88	−38	40	
19	Fleet Town	42	11	5	26	47	86	−39	38	
20	Ashford Town (Kent)	42	8	12	22	47	85	−38	36	
21	Dorking	42	8	11	23	43	89	−46	35	Relegated to Division Two
22	Croydon	42	5	10	27	37	91	−54	25	Relegated to Division Two

Rules for classification: 1) points; 2) goal difference; 3) number of goals scored.

=== Play-offs ===
Semifinals
4	Bromley	1(4)
5	Metropolitan Police	1(3)
3	Horsham	3
6	Cray Wanderers	1

Final
3	Horsham	1
4	Bromley	3

=== Stadia and locations ===
Locations of Division One clubs
Greater London Division One clubs

Club	Stadium
AFC Wimbledon	Kingsmeadow (groundshare with Kingstonian)
Ashford Town (Kent)	The Homelands
Banstead Athletic	Merland Rise
Bashley	Bashley Road
Bromley	Hayes Lane
Burgess Hill Town	Leylands Park
Corinthian-Casuals	King George's Field
Cray Wanderers	Hayes Lane (groundshare with Bromley)
Croydon	Croydon Sports Arena
Croydon Athletic	Keith Tuckey Stadium
Dorking	Meadowbank Stadium
Dulwich Hamlet	Champion Hill
Fleet Town	Calthorpe Park
Hastings United	The Pilot Field
Horsham	Queen Street
Leatherhead	Fetcham Grove
Metropolitan Police	Imber Court
Molesey	Walton Road Stadium
Newport (Isle of Wight)	St Georges Park
Tooting & Mitcham United	Imperial Fields
Walton & Hersham	The Sports Ground
Whyteleafe	Church Road

== Division Two ==
Isthmian League Division Two
- Season: 2004–05
- Champions: Ilford
- Promoted: Enfield; Ilford
- Matches: 240
- Goals: 788 (3.28 per match)
- Top goalscorer: 26 goals – Kevin Cooper (Hertford Town)
- Highest attendance: 428 – Enfield – Hertford Town, (23 April)
- Total attendance: 17,292
- Average attendance: 72

Division Two consisted of 16 clubs, including 12 clubs from the previous season, and four new clubs:

- Brook House, transferred from the Spartan South Midlands League
- Enfield, relegated from Division One North
- Epsom & Ewell, relegated from Division One South
- Ilford, joined from the Essex Senior League

Ilford won the division and were promoted to Southern League Eastern Division along with runners-up Enfield. There was no relegation from Division Two, though Abingdon Town resigned from the league at the end of the season.

=== League table ===
Pos	Team	Pld	W	D	L	GF	GA	GD	Pts	Promotion or relegation
1	Ilford	30	22	3	5	62	23	+39	69	Transferred to the Southern League Eastern Division
2	Enfield	30	21	3	6	64	33	+31	66	Transferred to the Southern League Eastern Division
3	Brook House	30	20	4	6	65	25	+40	64	
4	Hertford Town	30	17	7	6	65	40	+25	58	
5	Witham Town	30	16	3	11	67	53	+14	51	
6	Chertsey Town	30	15	6	9	55	48	+7	51	
7	Abingdon Town	30	13	9	8	65	42	+23	48	Resigned to the Hellenic League
8	Edgware Town	30	12	3	15	40	41	−1	39	
9	Flackwell Heath	30	11	5	14	50	55	−5	38	
10	Ware	30	9	10	11	41	55	−14	37	
11	Chalfont St Peter	30	9	7	14	41	52	−11	34	
12	Camberley Town	30	9	5	16	36	44	−8	32	
13	Wembley	30	8	5	17	41	55	−14	29	
14	Epsom & Ewell	30	8	4	18	41	64	−23	28	
15	Kingsbury Town	30	5	4	21	35	76	−41	19	
16	Clapton	30	3	6	21	20	82	−62	15	

Rules for classification: 1) points; 2) goal difference; 3) number of goals scored.

=== Stadia and locations ===
Locations of Division Two clubs
Greater London Division Two clubs

Club	Stadium
Abingdon Town	Culham Road
Brook House	Farm Park
Camberley Town	Krooner Park
Chalfont St Peter	Mill Meadow
Chertsey Town	Alwyns Lane
Clapton	The Old Spotted Dog Ground
Edgware Town	White Lion
Enfield	Wodson Park (groundshare with Ware)
Epsom & Ewell	Merland Rise (groundshare with Banstead Athletic)
Flackwell Heath	Wilks Park
Hertford Town	Hertingfordbury Park
Ilford	Cricklefield Stadium
Kingsbury Town	Avenue Park
Ware	Wodson Park
Wembley	Vale Farm
Witham Town	Spa Road

== League Cup ==
2004–05 Isthmian League Cup
Tournament details
- Country: England
- Teams: 60

Final positions
- Champions: Slough Town
- Runners-up: Hampton & Richmond Borough

The Isthmian League Cup 2004–05 was the 31st season of the Isthmian League Cup, the league cup competition of the Isthmian League. Sixty clubs took part. The competition commenced on 26 October 2004 and finished on 28 April 2005.

=== Calendar ===
Round	Main date	Matches	Clubs
First round	26 October	18	60 → 42
Second round	16 November	10	42 → 32
Third round	3 January	16	32 → 16
Fourth round	1 February	8	16 → 8
Quarterfinals	22 February	4	8 → 4
Semifinals	15 March and 22 March	4	4 → 2
Final	28 April	1	2 → 1

=== Fixtures and results ===
Fixtures are listed in alphabetical order, not that which they were drawn in.

==== First round ====
In the first round, the thirty-six lowest ranked clubs in the Isthmian League played each other for a place in the second round.

Tie	Home team (tier)	Score	Away team (tier)	Att.
1	AFC Wimbledon (1)	2–0	Flackwell Heath (2)	1,063
2	Bashley (1)	4–0	Abingdon Town (2)	46
3	Brook House (2)	3–2 (a.e.t.)	Molesey (1)	80
4	Chalfont St. Peter (2)	3–4	Clapton (2)	32
5	Chertsey Town (2)	1–2	Burgess Hill Town (1)	78
6	Cray Wanderers (1)	5–1	Camberley Town (2)	58
7	Croydon Athletic (1)	4–1	Dorking (1)	61
8	Dulwich Hamlet (1)	6–0	Corinthian-Casuals (1)	108
9	Edgware Town (2)	3–4	Horsham (1)	80

Tie	Home team (tier)	Score	Away team (tier)	Att.
10	Epsom & Ewell (2)	1–2	Witham Town (2)	45
11	Hertford Town (2)	1–0	Bromley (1)	90
12	Ilford (2)	1–2	Kingsbury Town (2)	50
13	Leatherhead (1)	1–0	Newport (Isle of Wight) (1)	69
14	Metropolitan Police (1)	5–1	Hastings United (1)	63
15	Tooting & Mitcham United (1)	2–1	Ashford Town (Kent) (1)	100
16	Walton & Hersham (1)	7–1	Banstead Athletic (1)	71
17	Ware (2)	2–3 (a.e.t.)	Enfield (2)	128
18	Wembley (2)	0–2	Croydon (1)	64

==== Second round ====
The eighteen clubs to have made it through the first round were entered into the second-round draw with Fleet Town and Whyteleafe, making twenty teams.

Tie	Home team (tier)	Score	Away team (tier)	Att.
19	Burgess Hill Town (1)	3–0	Whyteleafe (1)	95
20	Clapton (2)	0–1	Walton & Hersham (1)	43
21	Cray Wanderers (1)	2–1	Croydon (1)	66
22	Dulwich Hamlet (1)	4–1	Croydon Athletic (1)	79
23	Fleet Town (1)	3–0	Brook House (2)	72

Tie	Home team (tier)	Score	Away team (tier)	Att.
24	Horsham (1)	1–2	AFC Wimbledon (1)	868
25	Kingsbury Town (2)	3–4 (a.e.t.)	Enfield (2)	12
26	Leatherhead (1)	2–0 (a.e.t.)	Tooting & Mitcham United (1)	124
27	Metropolitan Police (1)	2–3	Hertford Town (2)	46
28	Witham Town (2)	2–3	Bashley (1)	38

==== Third round ====
The ten clubs to have made it through the second round were entered into the third-round draw with the twenty-two Premier Division clubs, making thirty-two teams.

Tie	Home team (tier)	Score	Away team (tier)	Att.
29	Billericay Town (P)	0–2	Heybridge Swifts (P)	221
30	Cray Wanderers (1)	1–0	Burgess Hill Town (1)	68
31	Dover Athletic (P)	1–2	AFC Wimbledon (1)	692
32	Enfield (2)	1–4 (a.e.t.)	Bashley (1)	86
33	Fleet Town (1)	0–2	Yeading (P)	96
34	Folkestone Invicta (P)	6–1	Kingstonian (P)	343
35	Hampton & Richmond Borough (P)	2–1 (a.e.t.)	Dulwich Hamlet (1)	230
36	Harrow Borough (P)	0–1	Braintree Town (P)	130

Tie	Home team (tier)	Score	Away team (tier)	Att.
37	Hendon (P)	3–6 (a.e.t.)	Leatherhead (1)	83
38	Hertford Town (2)	0–1	Chelmsford City (P)	252
39	Salisbury City (P)	2–0	Leyton (P)	240
40	Slough Town (P)	1–0	Cheshunt (P)	112
41	Walton & Hersham (1)	2–1	Northwood (P)	152
42	Wealdstone (P)	3–0	Tonbridge Angels (P)	156
43	Windsor & Eton (P)	0–1	Staines Town (P)	147
44	Worthing (P)	0–2	Eastleigh (P)	359

==== Fourth round ====
Tie	Home team (tier)	Score	Away team (tier)	Att.
45	AFC Wimbledon (1)	3–2	Cray Wanderers (1)	772
46	Chelmsford City (P)	2–1	Wealdstone (P)	229
47	Eastleigh (P)	1–2	Hampton & Richmond Borough (P)	192
48	Folkestone Invicta (P)	2–1	Bashley (1)	152

Tie	Home team (tier)	Score	Away team (tier)	Att.
49	Leatherhead (1)	3–3	Yeading (P)	107
Leatherhead advance on penalties
50	Slough Town (P)	3–0	Salisbury City (P)	193
51	Staines Town (P)	0–1	Heybridge Swifts (P)	82
52	Walton & Hersham (1)	0–2	Braintree Town (P)	102

==== Quarterfinals ====
Tie	Home team (tier)	Score	Away team (tier)	Att.
53	Chelmsford City (P)	3–0	Leatherhead (1)	217
54	Hampton & Richmond Borough (P)	1–0	Braintree Town (P)	138

Tie	Home team (tier)	Score	Away team (tier)	Att.
55	Heybridge Swifts (P)	1–1	Folkestone Invicta (P)	116
Heybridge Swifts advance on penalties
56	Slough Town (P)	4–2	AFC Wimbledon (1)	564

==== Semifinals ====
The semifinals fixtures were played over two legs.

First leg
Tie	Home team (tier)	Score	Away team (tier)	Att.
57	Hampton & Richmond Borough (P)	0–0	Chelmsford City (P)	207
58	Heybridge Swifts (P)	1–2	Slough Town (P)	275

Second leg
Tie	Home team (tier)	Score	Away team (tier)	Att.
59	Chelmsford City (P)	0–1	Hampton & Richmond Borough (P)	191
60	Slough Town (P)	2–1	Heybridge Swifts (P)	305

==== Final ====
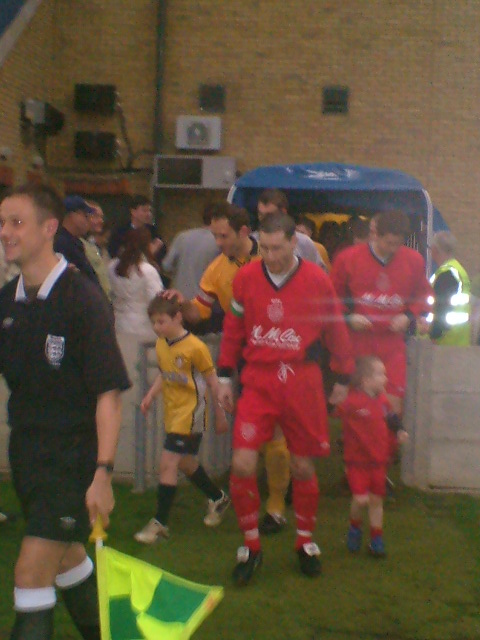
The players of Slough Town and Hampton & Richmond Borough enter the field of play for the final.

The only red card of the match came for Hampton & Richmond Borough's Dean Wells. There was also a yellow card for Slough Town's Josias Carbon.

28 April 2005

Hampton & Richmond Borough (P)	1–3	Slough Town (P)
Dudley Gardner		Ian Hodges; Josias Carbon

Wheatsheaf Park, Staines-upon-Thames
Attendance: 725
Referee: Martin Darlow

== See also ==
- Isthmian League
- 2004–05 Northern Premier League
- 2004–05 Southern Football League
