= Jimmy Hibburt =

English footballer

Personal information
- Full name: James Anthony Hibburt
- Date of birth: 30 October 1979 (age 47)
- Place of birth: Ashford, Surrey, England
- Height: 5 ft 11 in (1.80 m)
- Position: Defender

Youth career
- –1997: Crystal Palace

Senior career*
Years	Team	Apps	(Gls)
1997-2002	Crystal Palace	22	(0)
2000–2002	Woking		
2002–2005	Ashford Town	94	
- * Club domestic league appearances and goals

James Anthony Hibburt (born 30 October 1979, in Ashford, Surrey) is an English former professional footballer who played in the Football League, as a defender.

== Career ==
Hibburt began his youth career at Crystal Palace and signed professional terms in 1998. He made his senior debut in a 1–0 away win against Norwich City, in April 1999. After nine further appearance that season and twelve in 1999–2000, plus one in the UEFA Intertoto Cup, Hibburt was released by Palace in 2000. He trained with Brentford, under former Palace manager Steve Coppell, and also spent some time with FC Dallas, where he suffered an achilles tendon injury that badly affected his career, before eventually signing with Woking. He subsequently played for Ashford Town.

As of June 2015, he was part of the coaching staff at non-league club Bedfont Sports.
