= 2008–09 Isthmian League =

Football tournament season

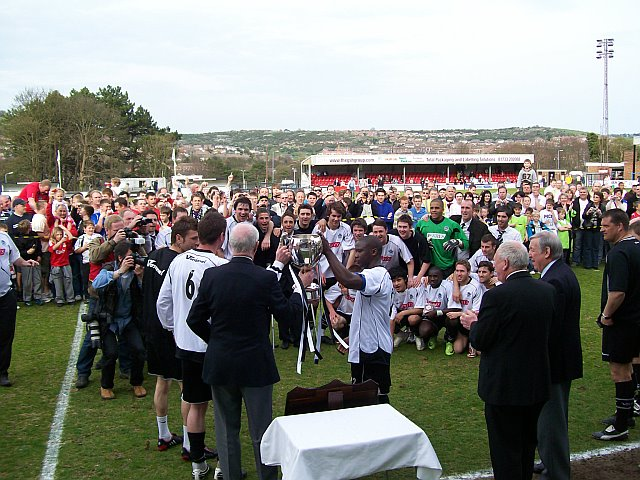
Dover Athletic receive the Isthmian League Premier Division trophy.

The 2008–09 season was the 94th season of the Isthmian League, which is an English football competition featuring semi-professional and amateur clubs from London, East and South East England.

== Premier Division ==
Isthmian League Premier Division
- Season: 2008–09
- Champions: Dover Athletic
- Promoted: Dover Athletic; Staines Town
- Relegated: Harlow Town; Heybridge Swifts; Ramsgate
- Matches: 462
- Goals: 1,321 (2.86 per match)
- Top goalscorer: 31 goal – Richard Jolly (Carshalton Athletic)
- Highest attendance: 2,760 – Dover Athletic – Tooting & Mitcham United, (26 December)
- Total attendance: 193,205
- Average attendance: 418 (-17.1% to previous season)

The Premier Division consisted of 22 clubs, including 17 clubs from the previous season, and five new clubs:

- Canvey Island, promoted as play-off winners in Division One North
- Dartford, promoted as champions of Division One North
- Dover Athletic, promoted as champions of Division One South
- Sutton United, relegated from the Conference South
- Tooting & Mitcham United, promoted as play-off winners in Division One South

Dover Athletic became champions five games before the end of the season and were promoted to the Conference South along with play-off winners Staines Town. Harlow Town, Heybridge Swifts and Ramsgate were relegated to the Division One sections, while Margate, who also finished in the relegation zone, were reprieved due to the demotion of clubs higher up the pyramid.

=== League table ===
Pos	Team	Pld	W	D	L	GF	GA	GD	Pts	Promotion or relegation
1	Dover Athletic	42	33	5	4	91	34	+57	104	Promoted to the Conference South
2	Staines Town	42	23	13	6	75	41	+34	82	Qualified for the play-offs, then promoted to the Conference South
3	Tonbridge Angels	42	20	13	9	82	54	+28	73	Qualified for the play-offs
4	Carshalton Athletic	42	19	11	12	64	63	+1	68	Qualified for the play-offs
5	Sutton United	42	18	13	11	57	53	+4	67	Qualified for the play-offs
6	AFC Hornchurch	42	19	8	15	60	51	+9	65	
7	Wealdstone	42	18	8	16	70	56	+14	62	
8	Dartford	42	17	11	14	62	49	+13	62	
9	Tooting & Mitcham United	42	16	10	16	57	57	0	58	
10	Ashford Town (Middlesex)	42	18	2	22	64	66	−2	56	
11	Billericay Town	42	15	11	16	54	66	−12	56	
12	Canvey Island	42	16	7	19	65	70	−5	55	
13	Horsham	42	16	7	19	49	60	−11	55	
14	Harrow Borough	42	14	12	16	56	73	−17	54	
15	Maidstone United	42	14	11	17	46	51	−5	53	
16	Hendon	42	15	6	21	69	65	+4	51	
17	Hastings United	42	14	7	21	52	68	−16	49	
18	Boreham Wood	42	12	12	18	48	61	−13	48	
19	Margate	42	13	7	22	51	64	−13	46	Reprieved from relegation
20	Harlow Town	42	13	6	23	61	77	−16	42 (Note: Harlow Town were deducted three points for fielding an ineligible player against Wealdstone on 14 February 2009 (2–1).)	Relegated to Division One North
21	Heybridge Swifts	42	10	11	21	41	63	−22	41	Relegated to Division One North
22	Ramsgate	42	8	11	23	47	79	−32	31 (Note: Ramsgate were deducted four points for playing more than permitted number of short term loan players in three matches, including Margate on 27 December 2008 (2–0) and Tonbridge Angels on 3 January 2009 (2–2).)	Relegated to Division One South

Rules for classification: 1) points; 2) goal difference; 3) number of goals scored.

==== Top scorers ====
Player	Club	Goals
Richard Jolly	Carshalton Athletic	31
Carl Rook	Tonbridge Angels	24
Byron Harrison	Ashford Town	22
Francis Collin	Dover Athletic	21
Paul Vines	Tooting & Mitcham United	20
Richard Butler	Staines Town	19
Laurent Hamici	Dulwich Hamlet	19
Sean Sonner	Northwood / Boreham Wood	18
Ryan Ashe	Wealdstone	16
John Frendo	Ware / Harlow Town	16

=== Play-offs ===
Semifinals
2	Staines Town	3
5	Sutton United	0
3	Tonbridge Angels	2
4	Carshalton Athletic	3

Final
Staines Town	1
Carshalton Athletic	0

=== Stadia and locations ===
Locations of the Premier Division clubs
Greater London Premier Division football clubs

Club	Stadium
AFC Hornchurch	Hornchurch Stadium
Ashford Town (Middlesex)	Short Lane
Billericay Town	New Lodge
Boreham Wood	Meadow Park
Canvey Island	Brockwell Stadium
Carshalton Athletic	War Memorial Sports Ground
Dartford	Princes Park
Dover Athletic	Crabble Athletic Ground
Harlow Town	Barrows Farm
Harrow Borough	Earlsmead Stadium
Hastings United	The Pilot Field
Hendon	Claremont Road
Heybridge Swifts	Scraley Road
Horsham	Woodside Road (groundshare with Worthing)
Maidstone United	Bourne Park (groundshare with Sittingbourne)
Margate	Hartsdown Park
Ramsgate	Southwood Stadium
Staines Town	Wheatsheaf Park
Sutton United	Gander Green Lane
Tonbridge Angels	Longmead Stadium
Tooting & Mitcham United	Imperial Fields
Wealdstone	Grosvenor Vale

1.Hendon left Claremont Road at September and spent the rest of campaign groundsharing with Northwood and Staines Town.

== Division One North ==
Isthmian League Division One North
- Season: 2008–09
- Champions: Aveley
- Promoted: Aveley; Waltham Abbey
- Relegated: Hillingdon Borough; Witham Town
- Matches: 462
- Goals: 1,354 (2.93 per match)
- Top goalscorer: 39 goals – Martin Tuohy (East Thurrock United)
- Highest attendance: 845 – East Thurrock United – Aveley, (25 April)
- Total attendance: 49,213
- Average attendance: 107 (-43.4% to previous season)

Division One North consisted of 22 clubs, including 15 clubs from the previous season, and seven new clubs:

- Chatham Town, transferred from Division One South
- Cheshunt, relegated from the Southern Football League Premier Division
- Concord Rangers, promoted as champions of the Essex Senior League
- East Thurrock United, relegated from the Premier Division
- Hillingdon Borough, transferred from Southern Football League Division One South & West
- Leyton, relegated from the Premier Division
- Thamesmead Town, promoted as champions of the Kent League

Aveley won the division and were promoted to the Premier Division along with play-off winners Waltham Abbey. Witham Town and Hillingdon Borough finished in the bottom two places and left the league.

=== League table ===
Pos	Team	Pld	W	D	L	GF	GA	GD	Pts	Promotion or relegation
1	Aveley	42	29	9	4	81	40	+41	96	Promoted to the Premier Division
2	East Thurrock United	42	30	5	7	112	50	+62	95	Qualified for the play-offs
3	Brentwood Town	42	26	10	6	77	32	+45	88	Qualified for the play-offs
4	Waltham Abbey	42	25	7	10	85	45	+40	82	Qualified for the play-offs, then promoted to the Premier Division
5	Concord Rangers	42	23	10	9	83	34	+49	79	Qualified for the play-offs
6	Northwood	42	22	12	8	65	39	+26	78	
7	Wingate & Finchley	42	19	10	13	67	51	+16	67	
8	Redbridge	42	18	10	14	61	50	+11	64	
9	Ware	42	19	4	19	69	75	−6	61	
10	Chatham Town	42	18	6	18	58	60	−2	60	Transferred to Division One South
11	Tilbury	42	16	10	16	62	53	+9	58	
12	Enfield Town	42	17	7	18	71	68	+3	58	
13	Great Wakering Rovers	42	16	10	16	56	62	−6	58	
14	Cheshunt	42	17	5	20	60	71	−11	56	
15	Leyton	42	12	15	15	63	56	+7	51	
16	Maldon Town	42	13	9	20	48	63	−15	45 (Note: Maldon Town were deducted three points for fielding a player without international clearance against Chatham Town on 27 September 2008 (2–0).)	
17	Ilford	42	12	5	25	27	68	−41	41	
18	Thamesmead Town	42	10	10	22	46	73	−27	40	
19	Potters Bar Town	42	9	10	23	52	73	−21	36 (Note: Potters Bar Town were deducted one point for fielding an unregistered player against Maldon Town on 23 September 2008 (0–0).)	
20	Waltham Forest	42	9	7	26	39	81	−42	34	
21	Witham Town	42	6	9	27	37	103	−66	27	Relegated to the Essex Senior League
22	Hillingdon Borough	42	4	4	34	35	107	−72	16	Relegated to the Spartan South Midlands League

Rules for classification: 1) points; 2) goal difference; 3) number of goals scored.

==== Top scorers ====
Player	Club	Goals
Martin Tuohy	East Thurrock United	39
Billy Holland	Waltham Abbey	20
Sherwin Stanley	Brentwood Town	20
Chris Stowe	Tilbury	18
Kris Newby	East Thurrock United	18

=== Play-offs ===
Semifinals
2	East Thurrock United	0
5	Concord Rangers	1
3	Brentwood Town	1
4	Waltham Abbey	4

Final
Concord Rangers	1 (4)
Waltham Abbey	1 (5)

=== Stadia and locations ===
Locations of Division One North clubs
Greater London Division One North clubs

Club	Stadium
Aveley	The Mill Field
Brentwood Town	The Brentwood Centre Arena
Chatham Town	The Sports Ground
Cheshunt	Cheshunt Stadium
Concord Rangers	Thames Road
East Thurrock United	Rookery Hill
Enfield Town	Goldsdown Road (groundshare with Brimsdown Rovers)
Great Wakering Rovers	Burroughs Park
Hillingdon Borough	Middlesex Stadium
Ilford	Cricklefield Stadium
Leyton	Leyton Stadium
Maldon Town	Wallace Binder Ground
Northwood	Chestnut Avenue
Potters Bar Town	Parkfield
Redbridge	Oakside
Thamesmead Town	Bayliss Avenue
Tilbury	Chadfields
Waltham Abbey	Capershotts
Waltham Forest	Cricklefield Stadium (groundshare with Ilford)
Ware	Wodson Park
Wingate & Finchley	The Harry Abrahams Stadium
Witham Town	Spa Road

== Division One South ==
Isthmian League Division One South
- Season: 2008–09
- Champions: Kingstonian
- Promoted: Cray Wanderers; Kingstonian
- Relegated: Crowborough Athletic
- Matches: 462
- Goals: 1,381 (2.99 per match)
- Top goalscorer: 32 goals – Bobby Traynor (Kingstonian)
- Highest attendance: 746 – Kingstonian – Cray Wanderers, (13 April)
- Total attendance: 83,529
- Average attendance: 181 (-21.0% to previous season)

Division One South consisted of 22 clubs, including 17 clubs from the previous season, and five new clubs:

- Crowborough Athletic, promoted as champions of the Sussex County League
- Fleet Town, transferred from Southern Football League Division One South & West
- Folkestone Invicta, relegated from the Premier Division
- Godalming Town, transferred from Southern Football League Division One South & West
- Merstham, promoted as champions of the Combined Counties League

Kingstonian won the division and were promoted to the Premier Division along with play-off winners Cray Wanderers. Crowborough Athletic finished bottom of the table and returned to the Sussex County League after only one season in the Isthmian League. Chipstead were reprieved from relegation due to the demotion of clubs higher up the pyramid.

=== League table ===
Pos	Team	Pld	W	D	L	GF	GA	GD	Pts	Promotion or relegation
1	Kingstonian	42	26	8	8	91	48	+43	86	Promoted to the Premier Division
2	Cray Wanderers	42	24	7	11	87	54	+33	79	Qualified for the play-offs, then promoted to the Premier Division
3	Fleet Town	42	21	15	6	82	43	+39	78	Qualified for the play-offs
4	Metropolitan Police	42	21	14	7	72	45	+27	77	Qualified for the play-offs
5	Worthing	42	21	13	8	77	48	+29	76	Qualified for the play-offs
6	Sittingbourne	42	19	13	10	63	54	+9	70	
7	Ashford Town (Kent)	42	16	15	11	68	54	+14	63	
8	Merstham	42	18	10	14	57	54	+3	63 (Note: Merstham were deducted one point for fielding a suspended player against Worthing on 11 April (2–4) and against Chipstead on 13 April (0–0).)	
9	Godalming Town	42	17	11	14	71	50	+21	62	
10	Croydon Athletic	42	16	14	12	67	54	+13	62	
11	Folkestone Invicta	42	16	11	15	54	46	+8	59	
12	Dulwich Hamlet	42	15	15	12	64	50	+14	57 (Note: Dulwich Hamlet were deducted three points for fielding an unregistered player against Eastbourne Town on 16 August (2–1).)	
13	Eastbourne Town	42	17	6	19	66	72	−6	57	
14	Walton & Hersham	42	13	11	18	46	55	−9	50	
15	Leatherhead	42	14	8	20	57	74	−17	50	
16	Whitstable Town	42	14	8	20	58	77	−19	50	
17	Walton Casuals	42	12	8	22	43	60	−17	44	
18	Whyteleafe	42	11	10	21	48	64	−16	43	
19	Burgess Hill Town	42	10	13	19	49	66	−17	43	
20	Corinthian-Casuals	42	11	10	21	61	91	−30	43	
21	Chipstead	42	8	12	22	57	96	−39	36	Reprieved from relegation
22	Crowborough Athletic	42	4	4	34	42	125	−83	13 (Note: Crowborough Athletic were deducted three points for fielding Kieran Wilson without international clearance in thirty league matches.)	Relegated to the Sussex County League

Rules for classification: 1) points; 2) goal difference; 3) number of goals scored.

==== Top scorers ====
Player	Club	Goals
Bobby Traynor	Kingstonian	32
Glen Stanley	Godalming Town	21
James Dryden	Folkestone Invicta	21
Mark Anderson	Fleet Town	20
Richard Brady	Sittingbourne	18

=== Play-offs ===
Semifinals
2	Cray Wanderers	1
5	Worthing	0
3	Fleet Town	0
4	Metropolitan Police	1

Final
Metropolitan Police	0
Cray Wanderers	1

=== Stadia and locations ===
Locations of Division One South clubs
Greater London Division One South clubs

Club	Stadium
Ashford Town (Kent)	The Homelands
Burgess Hill Town	Leylands Park
Chipstead	High Road
Corinthian-Casuals	King George's Field
Cray Wanderers	Hayes Lane (groundshare with Bromley)
Crowborough Athletic	Alderbrook Recreation Ground
Croydon Athletic	Keith Tuckey Stadium
Dulwich Hamlet	Champion Hill
Eastbourne Town	The Saffrons
Fleet Town	Calthorpe Park
Folkestone Invicta	Cheriton Road
Godalming Town	Weycourt
Kingstonian	Kingsmeadow (groundshare with AFC Wimbledon)
Leatherhead	Fetcham Grove
Merstham	Moatside
Metropolitan Police	Imber Court
Sittingbourne	Bourne Park
Walton & Hersham	The Sports Ground
Walton Casuals	Waterside Stadium
Whitstable Town	The Belmont Ground
Whyteleafe	Church Road
Worthing	Woodside Road

== League Cup ==
2008–09 Isthmian League Cup
Tournament details
- Country: England
- Teams: 66

Final positions
- Champions: Tilbury
- Runners-up: Harrow Borough

The Isthmian League Cup 2008–09 was the 35th season of the Isthmian League Cup, the league cup competition of the Isthmian League. Sixty-six clubs took part. The competition commenced on 18 November 2008 and finished on 8 April 2009.

=== Calendar ===
Round	Dates	Matches	Clubs
First round	18 November 2008	2	66 → 64
Second round	25 November 2008 to 20 January 2009	32	64 → 32
Third round	7 January 2009 to 27 January 2009	16	32 → 16
Fourth round	27 January 2009 to 24 February 2009	8	16 → 8
Quarterfinals	24 February 2009 to 4 March 2009	4	8 → 4
Semifinals	17 March 2009	2	4 → 2
Final	8 April 2009	1	2 → 1

=== Fixtures and results ===
Fixtures are listed in alphabetical order, not that which they were drawn in.

==== First round ====
Four clubs from division Ones participated in the first round, while all other clubs received a bye to the second round.

Tie	Home team (tier)	Score	Away team (tier)	Att.
1	Brentwood Town (N)	0–1	Potters Bar Town (N)	56
2	Great Wakering Rovers (N)	0–1	East Thurrock United (N)	60

==== Second round ====
The two clubs to have made it through the first round were entered into the draw with every other Isthmian League club, making sixty-four teams.

Tie	Home team (tier)	Score	Away team (tier)	Att.
3	AFC Hornchurch (P)	4–0	Potters Bar Town (N)	135
4	Ashford Town (Kent) (S)	1–2 (a.e.t.)	Thamesmead Town (N)	99
5	Aveley (N)	3–1	Maidstone United (P)	79
6	Billericay Town (P)	4–1	Enfield Town (N)	123
7	Boreham Wood (P)	2–3	Waltham Abbey (N)	40
8	Burgess Hill Town (S)	3–2	Hastings United (P)	84
9	Concord Rangers (N)	5–3 (a.e.t.)	East Thurrock United (N)	106
10	Crowborough Athletic (S)	0–4	Eastbourne Town (S)	101
11	Croydon Athletic (S)	0–2	Sutton United (P)	136
12	Dartford (P)	3–2	Margate (P)	306
13	Dover Athletic (P)	4–1	Canvey Island (P)	214
14	Dulwich Hamlet (S)	3–2 (a.e.t.)	Cray Wanderers (S)	82
15	Folkestone Invicta (S)	1–2	Tilbury (N)	115
16	Godalming Town (S)	1–0	Walton & Hersham (S)	89
17	Harlow Town (P)	4–2	Cheshunt (N)	118
18	Hendon (P)	0–2	Harrow Borough (P)	80
Played at Wembley F.C.

Tie	Home team (tier)	Score	Away team (tier)	Att.
19	Heybridge Swifts (P)	2–1 (a.e.t.)	Maldon Town (N)	93
20	Hillingdon Borough (N)	0–3	Kingstonian (S)	71
21	Ilford (N)	0–1	Redbridge (N)	37
22	Leatherhead (S)	0–2	Ashford Town (Middx) (P)	58
23	Leyton (N)	0–2	Ware (N)	27
24	Merstham (S)	2–5	Tonbridge Angels (P)	87
25	Northwood (N)	4–1	Corinthian-Casuals (S)	71
26	Ramsgate (P)	4–0	Chatham Town (N)	127
27	Sittingbourne (S)	0–1	Whitstable Town (S)	104
28	Tooting & Mitcham United (P)	2–5	Carshalton Athletic (P)	166
29	Walton Casuals (S)	1–6	Fleet Town (S)	81
30	Wealdstone (P)	5–2	Metropolitan Police (S)	73
31	Whyteleafe (S)	0–3	Chipstead (S)	60
32	Wingate & Finchley (N)	0–3	Staines Town (P)	37
33	Witham Town (N)	0–5 ‡	Waltham Forest (N)	54
34	Worthing (S)	1–2 (a.e.t.)	Horsham (P)	172

‡ – Waltham Forest removed from competition, Witham Town reinstalled

==== Third round ====
Tie	Home team (tier)	Score	Away team (tier)	Att.
35	AFC Hornchurch (P)	2–0	Witham Town (N)	141
36	Ashford Town (Middx) (P)	2–1 (a.e.t.)	Kingstonian (S)	114
37	Aveley (N)	1–4	Dover Athletic (P)	92
38	Burgess Hill Town (S)	1–3	Dulwich Hamlet (S)	59
Played at Dulwich Hamlet
39	Carshalton Athletic (P)	3–0	Tonbridge Angels (P)	104
40	Concord Rangers (N)	1–3	Dartford (P)	163
41	Eastbourne Town (S)	4–0	Chipstead (S)	60
42	Godalming Town (S)	1–2	Harrow Borough (P)	61

Tie	Home team (tier)	Score	Away team (tier)	Att.
43	Harlow Town (P)	3–2 (a.e.t.)	Heybridge Swifts (P)	120
44	Northwood (N)	2–0	Fleet Town (S)	66
45	Staines Town (P)	2–1 (a.e.t.)	Wealdstone (P)	194
46	Sutton United (P)	2–3 (a.e.t.)	Horsham (P)	116
47	Thamesmead Town (N)	0–4	Ramsgate (P)	58
48	Waltham Abbey (N)	2–3	Billericay Town (P)	138
Played at Billericay Town
49	Ware (N)	2–5	Redbridge (N)	63
50	Whitstable Town (S)	1–2	Tilbury (N)	100

==== Fourth round ====
Tie	Home team (tier)	Score	Away team (tier)	Att.
51	Billericay Town (P)	1–0	AFC Hornchurch (P)	172
52	Carshalton Athletic (P)	5–1	Eastbourne Town (S)	98
53	Dulwich Hamlet (S)	0–2 (a.e.t.)	Dover Athletic (P)	91
54	Harlow Town (P)	1–2	Harrow Borough (P)	113

Tie	Home team (tier)	Score	Away team (tier)	Att.
55	Horsham (P)	3–2 (a.e.t.)	Dartford (P)	188
56	Redbridge (N)	1–2	Ashford Town (Middx) (P)	38
57	Staines Town (P)	5–2 (a.e.t.)	Northwood (N)	117
58	Tilbury (N)	3–0	Ramsgate (P)	45

==== Quarterfinals ====
Tie	Home team (tier)	Score	Away team (tier)	Att.
59	Billericay Town (P)	3–2	Dover Athletic (P)	201
60	Carshalton Athletic (P)	2–3	Ashford Town (Middx) (P)	81

Tie	Home team (tier)	Score	Away team (tier)	Att.
61	Harrow Borough (P)	3–1	Horsham (P)	55
62	Tilbury (N)	1–1 (a.e.t.)	Staines Town (P)	41
Tilbury advance 4–2 on penalties

==== Semifinals ====
Tie	Home team (tier)	Score	Away team (tier)	Att.
63	Harrow Borough (P)	3–1	Ashford Town (Middx) (P)	82
64	Tilbury (N)	2–0	Billericay Town (P)	189

==== Final ====
8 April 2009
19:45

Harrow Borough (P)	0–2	Tilbury (S)
		Stowe 30' 51'

Wheatsheaf Park, Dartford
Attendance: 284

== See also ==
- Isthmian League
- 2008–09 Northern Premier League
- 2008–09 Southern Football League
