= 2009–10 Isthmian League =

The 2009–10 season was the 95th season of the Isthmian League, which is an English football competition featuring semi-professional and amateur clubs from London, East and South East England.

== Premier Division ==
Isthmian League Premier Division
- Season: 2009–10
- Champions: Dartford
- Promoted: Boreham Wood; Dartford
- Relegated: Ashford Town (Middlesex); Bognor Regis Town; Waltham Abbey
- Matches: 462
- Goals: 1,339 (2.9 per match)
- Top goalscorer: 28 goals – Bobby Traynor (Kingstonian)
- Highest attendance: 2,162 – Dartford – Aveley, (17 April)
- Total attendance: 161,050
- Average attendance: 349 (-16.5% to previous season)

The Premier Division consisted of 22 clubs, including 17 clubs from the previous season, and five new clubs:

- Aveley, promoted as champions of Division One North
- Bognor Regis Town, relegated from the Conference South
- Cray Wanderers, promoted as play-off winners in Division One South
- Kingstonian, promoted as champions of Division One South
- Waltham Abbey, promoted as play-off winners in Division One North

Dartford won the division and were promoted to the Conference South along with play-off winners Boreham Wood. Bognor Regis Town were relegated for the second season in a row along with Waltham Abbey, who had only spent one season in the Premier Division. Ashford Town resigned from the league. Margate were reprieved from relegation for the second season in a row, this time after Chester City and Farsley Celtic folded and Grays Athletic were demoted from the Conference Premier to Isthmian League Division One North.

=== League table ===
Pos	Team	Pld	W	D	L	GF	GA	GD	Pts	Promotion or relegation
1	Dartford	42	29	6	7	101	45	+56	93	Promoted to the Conference South
2	Sutton United	42	22	9	11	65	45	+20	75	Qualified for the play-offs
3	Aveley	42	21	7	14	83	62	+21	70	Qualified for the play-offs
4	Boreham Wood	42	20	8	14	54	44	+10	68	Qualified for the play-offs, then promoted to the Conference South
5	Kingstonian	42	20	8	14	73	69	+4	68	Qualified for the play-offs
6	Wealdstone	42	17	14	11	65	65	0	65	
7	Hastings United	42	18	9	15	68	56	+12	63	
8	Tonbridge Angels	42	18	8	16	69	67	+2	62	
9	AFC Hornchurch	42	16	13	13	51	47	+4	61	
10	Hendon	42	18	6	18	61	59	+2	60	
11	Horsham	42	16	8	18	65	67	−2	56	
12	Tooting & Mitcham United	42	15	10	17	60	64	−4	55	
13	Billericay Town	42	14	12	16	44	42	+2	54	
14	Harrow Borough	42	13	14	15	66	63	+3	53	
15	Cray Wanderers	42	14	9	19	54	70	−16	51	
16	Canvey Island	42	13	11	18	57	62	−5	50	
17	Carshalton Athletic	42	12	13	17	58	64	−6	49	
18	Maidstone United	42	13	10	19	39	57	−18	49	
19	Margate	42	11	12	19	49	71	−22	45	Reprieved from relegation
20	Ashford Town (Middlesex)	42	11	11	20	62	80	−18	44	Relegated to SFL Division One Central
21	Waltham Abbey	42	12	8	22	49	74	−25	44	Relegated to Division One North
22	Bognor Regis Town	42	9	14	19	45	65	−20	41	Relegated to Division One South

Rules for classification: 1) points; 2) goal difference; 3) number of goals scored.

==== Top scorers ====
Player	Club	Goals
Bobby Traynor	Kingstonian	28
Patrick Harding	Horsham	24
Martin Tuohy	Aveley	23
Paul Vines	Tooting & Mitcham United	23
Lee Burns	Dartford	22
Danny Gabriel	Waltham Forest / Aveley	21
Ade Olorunda	Hastings United	20
James Rowe	Canvey Island	19
Byron Harrison	Ashford Town / Carshalton Athletic	17

=== Play-offs ===
Semifinals
2	Sutton United	2
5	Kingstonian	4
3	Aveley	0
4	Boreham Wood	1

Final
4	Boreham Wood	2
5	Kingstonian	0

=== Results grid ===
Home \ Away	AFC	ASH	AVE	BIL	BOG	BOR	CAN	CAR	CRA	DAR	HAR	HAS	HEN	HOR	KIN	MDS	MAR	SUT	TON	T&M	WAL	WEA
AFC Hornchurch		1–0	2–1	0–0	3–0	2–1	1–0	2–2	0–2	0–2	2–1	1–1	4–4	2–1	1–1	1–0	1–0	1–0	1–1	0–1	4–1	0–0
Ashford Town	1–1		2–2	3–2	2–2	0–2	1–1	1–2	3–0	1–4	2–6	3–2	1–1	0–2	3–1	0–2	2–2	0–1	3–2	2–1	1–1	3–3
Aveley	1–1	2–1		1–0	2–0	2–0	4–2	4–0	1–1	1–4	1–2	3–0	1–2	2–1	3–4	2–0	0–3	0–1	2–0	1–2	3–1	2–2
Billericay Town	2–0	0–1	2–1		1–0	2–0	4–1	0–4	1–1	1–0	1–2	2–0	1–0	1–2	1–5	1–1	1–2	0–1	1–1	0–0	1–1	0–0
Bognor Regis Town	4–2	2–0	1–1	1–1		0–1	2–2	1–0	1–1	0–2	1–1	0–1	0–3	1–1	3–1	0–0	3–3	1–2	3–1	0–3	1–2	2–2
Boreham Wood	0–0	3–3	3–2	2–0	1–0		1–3	3–1	2–4	0–1	1–0	0–0	2–1	4–0	0–1	0–2	1–1	1–2	2–0	3–2	3–0	0–1
Canvey Island	1–0	2–1	1–4	0–0	0–0	0–1		2–2	5–1	2–5	1–1	1–0	2–3	1–2	1–2	0–1	2–0	1–2	1–1	2–1	2–3	1–1
Carshalton Athletic	1–0	3–1	0–3	1–0	1–0	0–0	0–0		2–0	0–4	2–2	1–3	0–0	1–2	1–2	0–1	1–2	0–0	1–2	4–1	4–1	4–2
Cray Wanderers	1–0	1–0	1–2	0–2	0–2	1–1	1–2	3–3		1–2	1–3	1–2	2–0	1–1	2–1	1–0	3–2	1–2	1–3	1–0	1–2	1–3
Dartford	0–1	3–2	2–2	1–4	3–3	1–2	2–1	1–1	1–1		2–0	4–3	5–0	3–2	5–0	3–0	0–1	0–2	2–0	3–2	2–1	1–1
Harrow Borough	0–0	1–2	3–3	1–0	1–2	2–0	0–0	3–3	1–1	0–1		0–3	0–3	2–2	2–0	2–1	3–0	1–1	1–3	1–1	5–3	3–1
Hastings United	1–0	4–4	0–1	1–1	1–2	2–1	1–1	3–1	2–3	1–3	1–1		2–1	3–1	0–0	1–2	2–1	1–3	5–1	2–0	2–0	1–0
Hendon	3–2	2–1	4–1	1–0	2–0	0–1	2–1	1–0	2–0	1–2	3–1	1–3		1–1	0–3	3–0	1–2	1–2	0–0	0–0	0–2	2–3
Horsham	2–1	4–1	0–2	0–2	2–1	1–3	1–2	2–2	4–0	1–3	2–0	4–2	3–1		0–1	1–0	3–3	1–0	0–3	1–2	2–1	1–3
Kingstonian	2–0	1–0	1–6	2–1	1–3	4–1	2–1	1–0	4–1	2–6	3–5	1–2	3–0	2–1		1–1	2–0	2–1	2–3	1–1	1–1	3–3
Maidstone United	0–0	2–0	4–2	1–0	1–0	0–1	0–3	0–2	1–1	0–1	0–3	0–5	0–3	1–1	1–3		0–1	2–1	2–2	1–2	2–0	2–3
Margate	0–0	1–1	2–3	1–3	1–1	2–1	1–2	1–1	0–1	0–4	2–2	1–0	2–3	1–3	2–1	0–1		1–1	0–3	2–1	0–3	1–1
Sutton United	4–1	2–4	3–2	2–1	0–0	0–1	1–2	3–0	1–4	0–3	1–0	2–2	3–1	2–1	1–1	0–0	4–0		2–1	1–2	0–0	5–0
Tonbridge Angels	1–2	3–2	3–2	0–1	2–0	0–2	3–1	2–0	3–2	1–4	3–2	2–2	2–1	2–2	1–0	2–1	0–0	1–2		1–2	2–0	2–3
Tooting & Mitcham United	2–3	2–3	1–2	1–1	3–1	0–2	1–3	2–2	0–2	3–1	1–0	1–0	0–2	0–2	2–3	2–2	2–1	1–1	5–3		1–1	3–2
Waltham Abbey	0–5	0–1	0–2	0–2	4–1	1–1	2–1	2–1	0–1	0–4	1–1	0–1	1–0	2–1	1–0	1–2	3–4	1–2	0–2	1–1		1–2
Wealdstone	2–3	1–0	0–1	0–0	4–0	0–0	1–0	1–4	3–2	1–1	2–1	1–0	0–2	2–1	2–2	2–2	1–0	2–1	2–1	0–2	2–4	

Updated to match(es) played on 30 April 2010. Source: Ryman League Premier Division
Legend: Blue = home team win; Yellow = draw; Red = away team win.

=== Stadia and locations ===
Locations of the Premier Division clubs
Greater London Premier Division football clubs

Club	Stadium	Capacity
AFC Hornchurch	Hornchurch Stadium	3,500
Ashford Town (Middlesex)	Short Lane	2,550
Aveley	The Mill Field	1,100
Billericay Town	New Lodge	3,500
Bognor Regis Town	Nyewood Lane	4,500
Boreham Wood	Meadow Park	4,502
Canvey Island	Brockwell Stadium	4,308
Carshalton Athletic	War Memorial Sports Ground	5,000
Cray Wanderers	Hayes Lane (groundshare with Bromley)	6,000
Dartford	Princes Park	4,100
Harrow Borough	Earlsmead Stadium	3,070
Hastings United	The Pilot Field	4,050
Hendon	Vale Farm (groundshare with Wembley)	3,000
Horsham	Gorings Mead (groundshare with Horsham YMCA)	1,500
Kingstonian	Kingsmeadow (groundshare with AFC Wimbledon)	4,722
Maidstone United	The Homelands (groundshare with Ashford Town (Kent))	3,200
Margate	Hartsdown Park	2,100
Sutton United	Gander Green Lane	7,032
Tonbridge Angels	Longmead Stadium	3,000
Tooting & Mitcham United	Imperial Fields	3,500
Waltham Abbey	Capershotts	3,500
Wealdstone	Grosvenor Vale	2,640

== Division One North ==
Isthmian League Division One North
- Season: 2009–10
- Champions: Lowestoft Town
- Promoted: Concord Rangers; Lowestoft Town
- Relegated: None
- Matches: 462
- Goals: 1,436 (3.11 per match)
- Top goalscorer: 35 goals – Sam Higgins (East Thurrock United)
- Highest attendance: 1,139 – Lowestoft Town – Cheshunt, (10 April)
- Total attendance: 60,663
- Average attendance: 131 (+22.4% to previous season)

Division One North consisted of 22 clubs, including 17 clubs from the previous season, and five new clubs:

- Harlow Town, relegated from the Premier Division
- Heybridge Swifts, relegated from the Premier Division
- Lowestoft Town, promoted as champions of the Eastern Counties League
- Romford, promoted as champions of the Essex Senior League
- VCD Athletic, promoted as champions of the Kent League

Lowestoft Town won the division and were promoted for the second season in a row along with play-off winners Concord Rangers. Leyton were reprieved from relegation after numerous higher league clubs folded. VCD Athletic were demoted after failing to meet ground grading requirements and returned to the Kent League. Harlow Town were reprieved from relegation after an appeal by VCD was turned down.

After the end of the season Maldon Town merged with 14° Essex Senior League side Tiptree United to form a new club Maldon & Tiptree, who took the place of Maldon Town in 2010–11 IL Division One North.

=== League table ===
Pos	Team	Pld	W	D	L	GF	GA	GD	Pts	Promotion or relegation
1	Lowestoft Town	42	32	5	5	115	37	+78	101	Promoted to the Premier Division
2	Concord Rangers	42	26	8	8	94	42	+52	86	Qualified for the play-offs, then promoted to the Premier Division
3	Wingate & Finchley	42	24	9	9	88	55	+33	81	Qualified for the play-offs
4	Enfield Town	42	23	11	8	81	47	+34	80	Qualified for the play-offs
5	East Thurrock United	42	23	8	11	102	59	+43	77	Qualified for the play-offs
6	Heybridge Swifts	42	21	8	13	67	56	+11	71	
7	Thamesmead Town	42	20	7	15	67	56	+11	67	
8	VCD Athletic	42	19	10	13	61	53	+8	67	Demoted to the Kent League
9	Great Wakering Rovers	42	18	10	14	67	70	−3	64	
10	Northwood	42	17	10	15	65	61	+4	61	Transferred to SFL Division One Central
11	Tilbury	42	15	11	16	61	60	+1	56	
12	Brentwood Town	42	15	7	20	53	53	0	52	
13	Romford	42	15	7	20	71	88	−17	52	
14	Potters Bar Town	42	14	8	20	51	67	−16	50	
15	Cheshunt	42	16	2	24	57	83	−26	50	
16	Waltham Forest	42	13	9	20	51	75	−24	48	
17	Maldon Town	42	13	6	23	54	74	−20	45	Merged with Tiptree United (14° Essex Senior League) to form Maldon & Tiptree in Division One North
18	Redbridge	42	9	15	18	41	62	−21	42	
19	Ware	42	11	9	22	57	84	−27	42	
20	Ilford	42	11	10	21	47	72	−25	34 (Note: Ilford were deducted nine points for fielding a suspended player in five games between August and January.)	
21	Leyton	42	5	15	22	40	84	−44	30	Reprieved from relegation
22	Harlow Town	42	6	7	29	46	98	−52	15 (Note: Harlow Town were deducted ten points for entering administration.)	Reprieved from relegation

Rules for classification: 1) points; 2) goal difference; 3) number of goals scored.

==== Top scorers ====
Player	Club	Goals
Sam Higgins	East Thurrock United	35
Leon Smith	Wingate & Finchley	26
Matt Nolan	Lowestoft Town	24
Lyle Taylor	Concord Rangers	22
Andrew Constable	Thamesmead Town	22

=== Play-offs ===
Semifinals
2	Concord Rangers	1
5	East Thurrock United	0
3	Wingate & Finchley	2
4	Enfield Town	3

Final
2	Concord Rangers	3
4	Enfield Town	1

=== Results grid ===
Home \ Away	BRE	CHE	CON	ETU	ENF	GWR	HAR	HEY	ILF	LEY	LOW	MLD	NOR	POT	RED	ROM	THA	TIL	VCD	WFO	WAR	W&F
Brentwood Town		0–1	2–2	2–0	0–1	0–1	2–0	0–1	1–0	1–2	0–2	0–2	2–3	2–1	2–0	2–2	0–2	0–0	1–1	2–0	0–1	1–2
Cheshunt	2–1		1–2	4–2	3–1	1–0	2–1	2–3	2–0	0–2	0–3	2–1	1–2	1–2	2–0	2–3	1–5	1–0	0–3	0–1	2–3	1–3
Concord Rangers	2–0	2–0		1–1	1–1	3–1	3–0	2–2	1–0	1–2	5–0	2–0	1–4	2–1	0–0	5–0	3–1	3–0	1–0	2–0	2–0	3–2
East Thurrock United	1–2	6–1	2–2		0–0	1–2	1–1	4–0	5–2	4–1	1–2	3–1	3–2	4–1	3–0	1–0	3–1	5–2	2–2	2–2	2–1	3–0
Enfield Town	2–1	4–0	2–1	0–4		2–3	2–1	1–0	0–1	3–0	2–2	1–0	2–0	1–1	1–1	2–0	2–0	4–3	1–2	4–2	3–2	0–0
Great Wakering Rovers	4–3	3–2	0–3	2–0	3–3		2–0	0–2	2–0	0–0	0–3	3–1	1–0	0–1	2–2	3–1	1–0	1–1	0–1	4–1	1–3	2–4
Harlow Town	0–3	0–2	0–7	1–3	1–3	4–2		0–4	1–2	2–2	0–4	1–2	2–4	1–2	3–3	2–0	2–3	0–2	1–2	0–2	1–1	0–2
Heybridge Swifts	2–1	3–1	2–1	0–2	1–1	2–3	1–0		4–2	0–1	0–3	1–0	1–1	1–1	4–0	3–2	2–0	4–3	1–2	3–1	2–1	1–2
Ilford	1–1	1–2	1–2	0–3	0–3	2–2	2–2	2–0		2–2	1–3	1–2	1–1	6–1	3–2	1–1	1–1	5–4	0–3	0–0	2–0	1–1
Leyton	0–1	1–3	0–4	2–3	0–3	1–2	0–2	0–1	0–1		1–1	2–2	1–1	1–2	1–1	0–3	0–1	0–0	1–1	1–3	2–2	1–1
Lowestoft Town	1–2	5–1	5–0	4–3	0–0	3–0	3–0	2–0	0–1	8–0		4–0	3–0	4–2	2–0	6–1	3–1	3–0	2–0	4–1	2–3	2–1
Maldon Town	1–2	0–3	1–4	1–2	0–4	3–1	2–2	1–2	4–0	3–1	0–2		1–2	0–4	0–3	0–1	3–3	1–0	4–3	0–1	2–1	2–1
Northwood	0–3	2–1	0–1	3–4	2–1	3–3	2–1	2–2	1–0	2–2	1–3	1–1		3–2	1–1	1–2	0–1	0–0	2–0	2–1	6–0	0–1
Potters Bar Town	1–2	0–1	0–2	0–3	1–4	1–1	1–0	0–2	0–1	0–1	1–1	1–1	1–0		0–2	1–2	1–1	1–1	0–2	3–1	2–1	1–3
Redbridge	1–0	1–0	2–0	1–0	1–1	1–2	0–3	0–0	1–2	2–2	0–5	1–3	3–1	0–1		2–0	1–2	2–2	1–2	1–0	0–2	0–0
Romford	0–4	1–1	3–2	3–2	2–3	4–1	5–4	4–1	0–0	2–2	1–3	2–0	1–2	0–2	1–1		1–4	1–2	4–2	3–4	1–2	0–0
Thamesmead Town	2–0	7–2	2–1	2–1	0–3	1–2	2–1	2–1	1–0	4–0	0–2	1–5	2–0	2–1	3–0	0–3		1–0	2–2	0–1	1–1	1–2
Tilbury	3–1	2–2	1–1	2–2	1–0	1–1	4–1	0–2	2–0	2–1	1–2	2–0	0–1	0–1	2–1	4–1	1–0		0–1	2–2	3–1	2–1
VCD Athletic	1–1	1–0	2–2	4–2	0–1	1–1	1–2	0–2	2–0	4–3	0–2	1–0	4–1	1–1	0–0	0–1	0–0	3–2		1–2	1–0	2–1
Waltham Forest	1–0	1–3	0–3	0–3	0–4	2–2	1–1	1–1	3–0	1–0	1–2	2–1	0–0	2–3	0–0	1–4	1–4	0–1	2–1		1–1	3–4
Ware	2–3	1–0	0–3	1–5	3–3	2–1	1–2	2–2	3–2	1–1	2–2	1–3	1–2	1–4	2–2	4–3	1–0	0–1	1–2	1–3		0–1
Wingate & Finchley	2–2	4–1	1–6	1–1	4–2	1–2	6–0	3–1	3–0	4–0	4–2	0–0	0–4	3–1	2–1	6–2	1–1	3–2	3–0	2–0	3–1	

Updated to match(es) played on 30 April 2010. Source: Ryman League Division One North
Legend: Blue = home team win; Yellow = draw; Red = away team win.

=== Stadia and locations ===
Locations of Division One North clubs
Greater London Division One North clubs
Division One Central Essex teams

Club	Stadium	Capacity
Brentwood Town	The Brentwood Centre Arena	1,000
Cheshunt	Cheshunt Stadium	3,000
Concord Rangers	Thames Road	1,500
East Thurrock United	Rookery Hill	3,500
Enfield Town	Goldsdown Road (groundshare with Brimsdown Rovers)	3,000
Great Wakering Rovers	Burroughs Park	2,500
Harlow Town	Barrows Farm	3,500
Heybridge Swifts	Scraley Road	3,000
Ilford	Cricklefield Stadium	3,500
Leyton	Leyton Stadium	2,500
Lowestoft Town	Crown Meadow	3,000
Maldon Town	Wallace Binder Ground	2,000
Northwood	Chestnut Avenue	3,075
Potters Bar Town	Parkfield	2,000
Redbridge	Oakside	3,000
Romford	Mill Field (groundshare with Aveley)	1,100
Thamesmead Town	Bayliss Avenue	6,000
Tilbury	Chadfields	4,000
VCD Athletic	The Oakwood	1,180
Waltham Forest	Cricklefield Stadium (groundshare with Ilford)	3,500
Ware	Wodson Park	3,300
Wingate & Finchley	The Harry Abrahams Stadium	1,500

== Division One South ==
Isthmian League Division One South
- Season: 2009–10
- Champions: Croydon Athletic
- Promoted: Croydon Athletic; Folkestone Invicta
- Relegated: None
- Matches: 462
- Goals: 1,322 (2.86 per match)
- Top goalscorer: 24 goals – Gary Noël (Croydon Athletic)
- Highest attendance: 2,134 – Folkestone Invicta – Croydon Athletic, (20 April)
- Total attendance: 74,088
- Average attendance: 160 (-11.6% to previous season)

Division One South consisted of 22 clubs, including 19 clubs from the previous season, and three new clubs:

- Chatham Town, transferred from Division One North
- Horsham YMCA, promoted as Third Place of the Sussex County League
- Ramsgate, relegated from the Premier Division

Folkestone Invicta won the play-offs and returned to the Premier Division after two seasons of absence along with Croydon Athletic, who won the division. Walton Casuals and Eastbourne Town finished in the relegation zone but were reprieved due to the resignation of Ashford Town (Kent) and as a knock-on effect from Merthyr Tydfil's expulsion from the Southern League.

=== League table ===
Pos	Team	Pld	W	D	L	GF	GA	GD	Pts	Promotion or relegation
1	Croydon Athletic	42	27	8	7	92	39	+53	89	Promoted to the Premier Division
2	Folkestone Invicta	42	28	8	6	54	23	+31	82 (Note: Folkestone Invicta were deducted ten points for insolvency.)	Qualified for the play-offs, then promoted to the Premier Division
3	Worthing	42	25	5	12	83	53	+30	80	Qualified for the play-offs
4	Godalming Town	42	26	5	11	71	44	+27	80 (Note: Godalming Town were deducted three points for fielding a suspended player against Merstham on 19 September (3–1).)	Qualified for the play-offs
5	Leatherhead	42	22	8	12	78	45	+33	74	Qualified for the play-offs
6	Fleet Town	42	22	6	14	74	49	+25	72	
7	Burgess Hill Town	42	19	10	13	64	50	+14	67	
8	Walton & Hersham	42	18	8	16	55	54	+1	62	
9	Sittingbourne	42	18	7	17	63	48	+15	61	
10	Metropolitan Police	42	17	9	16	59	50	+9	60	
11	Horsham YMCA	42	15	14	13	67	61	+6	59	
12	Dulwich Hamlet	42	14	12	16	57	64	−7	54	
13	Corinthian-Casuals	42	17	3	22	66	79	−13	54	
14	Ramsgate	42	13	14	15	55	61	−6	53	
15	Whyteleafe	42	15	6	21	60	64	−4	51	
16	Merstham	42	12	12	18	62	80	−18	48	
17	Chatham Town	42	14	4	24	55	75	−20	46	
18	Whitstable Town	42	14	3	25	41	85	−44	45	
19	Chipstead	42	11	10	21	47	65	−18	43	
20	Ashford Town (Kent)	42	9	11	22	49	90	−41	38	Club resigned before the new season
21	Walton Casuals	42	8	10	24	41	66	−25	34	Reprieved from relegation
22	Eastbourne Town	42	6	11	25	29	77	−48	29	Reprieved from relegation

Rules for classification: 1) points; 2) goal difference; 3) number of goals scored.

==== Top scorers ====
Player	Club	Goals
Gary Noël	Croydon Athletic	24
Martin Grant	Walton Casuals / Walton & Hersham	20
Phil Williams	Godalming Town	20
Hicham Akhazzan	Sittingbourne	18
Gavin Gordon	Worthing / Merstham	18

=== Play-offs ===
Semifinals
2	Folkestone Invicta (pens)	2 (5)
5	Leatherhead	2 (3)
3	Worthing	1
4	Godalming Town	2

Final
2	Folkestone Invicta	2
4	Godalming Town	1

=== Results grid ===
Home \ Away	ASH	BUR	CHA	CHI	COR	CRO	DUL	EST	FLE	FOL	GOD	HYM	LEA	MER	MET	RAM	SIT	W&H	WAL	WHT	WHY	WOR
Ashford Town		0–1	2–1	1–1	4–2	0–6	2–2	2–1	1–4	1–0	2–2	3–2	0–1	0–2	0–1	2–3	2–0	1–2	2–2	0–1	3–2	1–3
Burgess Hill Town	2–2		2–1	3–1	2–0	0–0	1–0	3–0	3–2	0–1	1–1	4–0	1–1	1–1	2–1	1–2	1–0	0–2	1–1	0–1	0–0	3–1
Chatham Town	0–0	3–2		0–1	1–3	1–2	0–2	0–0	1–2	1–2	1–3	1–1	4–3	3–2	3–1	0–1	0–2	3–0	0–1	2–0	2–1	0–1
Chipstead	1–0	1–2	1–0		1–3	2–2	1–1	4–0	1–2	0–0	0–1	2–0	1–3	0–1	1–4	0–0	0–0	0–1	1–1	3–0	1–4	0–2
Corinthian-Casuals	5–1	3–1	4–3	3–0		2–4	1–3	2–0	2–2	1–2	1–2	2–1	0–2	3–4	2–1	0–3	1–1	2–1	3–2	2–3	1–2	0–4
Croydon Athletic	7–0	2–0	3–4	3–0	3–0		2–0	3–0	3–2	1–0	3–2	0–0	3–2	1–0	0–2	2–0	2–1	2–4	1–0	3–1	0–2	3–1
Dulwich Hamlet	0–1	0–2	3–3	1–1	0–1	1–3		1–1	1–0	0–1	1–3	2–2	1–1	3–1	1–1	3–1	0–2	0–3	3–1	4–2	0–2	0–2
Eastbourne Town	2–2	1–2	0–1	2–4	2–3	1–1	2–0		1–3	1–2	0–2	0–0	0–4	1–1	0–2	0–2	1–0	1–1	2–0	3–1	0–1	3–0
Fleet Town	6–2	1–4	4–3	2–0	1–0	1–0	0–1	3–0		0–1	3–0	2–0	1–0	6–0	1–1	1–1	0–0	0–1	2–1	3–0	2–1	0–3
Folkestone Invicta	1–0	3–1	2–0	2–1	0–1	0–0	0–0	1–0	2–0		0–1	3–0	0–0	2–0	1–0	3–1	3–1	1–0	3–2	1–0	0–1	0–0
Godalming Town	1–1	2–0	3–0	2–1	1–0	0–1	2–0	3–1	2–2	0–2		5–3	1–0	3–1	0–1	1–2	2–0	1–0	4–2	0–1	3–2	0–1
Horsham YMCA	2–1	1–1	2–0	1–2	4–0	2–5	1–3	9–0	3–2	1–1	0–2		4–2	0–0	0–0	1–1	1–1	1–1	1–0	1–0	4–0	1–0
Leatherhead	2–0	2–0	3–0	2–1	1–0	0–0	6–1	1–1	1–1	1–2	0–2	2–6		3–1	2–0	3–1	4–2	0–1	1–1	7–1	1–2	2–0
Merstham	4–0	1–1	2–1	0–3	2–3	1–5	1–1	3–0	0–2	1–1	2–4	2–2	0–0		2–2	4–2	0–3	3–0	1–1	3–2	2–2	3–2
Metropolitan Police	2–2	2–1	1–3	4–0	1–0	0–0	4–0	1–1	0–2	0–1	3–1	1–2	1–3	2–1		1–1	2–1	1–2	1–3	5–0	1–0	1–2
Ramsgate	0–0	1–3	2–3	1–1	3–2	1–0	1–3	3–0	1–0	1–2	0–0	1–1	0–2	1–2	1–1		1–6	2–1	0–0	0–0	2–2	5–2
Sittingbourne	2–1	2–3	4–0	1–2	4–1	2–2	1–2	3–0	2–1	2–0	0–1	0–0	0–3	2–0	3–0	2–1		0–1	3–1	2–3	2–1	2–1
Walton & Hersham	3–0	1–0	1–2	2–2	2–2	0–3	0–2	0–0	3–2	1–1	2–0	1–2	1–0	2–1	0–1	2–2	1–0		3–0	2–0	1–1	2–3
Walton Casuals	1–4	2–2	0–1	4–1	1–0	2–3	2–2	0–0	0–1	0–1	0–1	0–3	1–0	2–3	1–2	0–2	1–1	2–1		0–1	0–1	0–2
Whitstable Town	3–0	2–1	1–2	1–0	0–1	0–5	1–4	1–0	2–4	1–3	0–3	0–2	1–2	2–1	1–0	1–0	0–1	2–1	0–1		1–1	3–3
Whyteleafe	2–2	1–2	3–1	0–2	1–4	0–2	1–4	0–1	0–1	0–1	1–2	5–0	1–2	5–2	0–2	1–0	1–2	3–1	2–1	4–1		1–4
Worthing	5–1	1–4	2–0	3–2	3–0	2–1	1–1	2–0	1–0	1–2	3–2	3–0	1–3	1–1	3–2	2–2	1–0	5–1	0–1	5–0	1–0	

Updated to match(es) played on 30 April 2010. Source: Ryman League Division One South
Legend: Blue = home team win; Yellow = draw; Red = away team win.

=== Stadia and locations ===
Locations of Division One South clubs
Greater London Division One South clubs

Club	Stadium	Capacity
Ashford Town (Kent)	The Homelands (groundshare with Maidstone United)	3,200
Burgess Hill Town	Leylands Park	2,000
Chatham Town	The Sports Ground	5,000
Chipstead	High Road	2,000
Corinthian-Casuals	King George's Field	2,700
Croydon Athletic	Keith Tuckey Stadium	3,000
Dulwich Hamlet	Champion Hill	3,000
Eastbourne Town	The Saffrons	3,000
Fleet Town	Calthorpe Park	2,000
Folkestone Invicta	Cheriton Road	4,000
Godalming Town	Weycourt	3,000
Horsham YMCA	Gorings Mead (groundshare with Horsham)	1,500
Leatherhead	Fetcham Grove	3,400
Merstham	Moatside	2,000
Metropolitan Police	Imber Court	3,000
Ramsgate	Southwood Stadium	2,500
Sittingbourne	Bourne Park	3,000
Walton & Hersham	The Sports Ground	2,000
Walton Casuals	Waterside Stadium	2,000
Whitstable Town	The Belmont Ground	3,000
Whyteleafe	Church Road	2,000
Worthing	Woodside Road	4,000

== League Cup ==
2009–10 Isthmian League Cup
Tournament details
- Country: England
- Teams: 66

Final positions
- Champions: Leatherhead
- Runners-up: Wealdstone

The Isthmian League Cup 2009–10 was the 36th season of the Isthmian League Cup, the league cup competition of the Isthmian League. Sixty-six clubs took part. The competition commenced on 20 October 2009 and finished on 24 March 2010.

=== Calendar ===
Round	Dates	Matches	Clubs
First round	20 October 2009	2	66 → 64
Second round	3 November 2009 to 13 November 2009	32	64 → 32
Third round	24 November 2009 to 4 February 2010	16	32 → 16
Fourth round	26 January 2010 to 4 March 2010	8	16 → 8
Quarterfinals	23 February 2010 to 11 March 2010	4	8 → 4
Semifinals	11 March 2010 to 18 March 2010	2	4 → 2
Final	24 March 2010	1	2 → 1

=== First round ===
Four clubs from division Ones participated in the first round, while all other clubs received a bye to the second round.

Tie	Home team (tier)	Score	Away team (tier)	Att.
1	Cheshunt (N)	0–2	Northwood (N)	96
2	Godalming Town (S)	4–2	Merstham (S)	75

=== Second round ===
The two clubs to have made it through the first round were entered into the draw with every other Isthmian League club, making sixty-four clubs.

Tie	Home team (tier)	Score	Away team (tier)	Att.
3	Folkestone Invicta (S)	0–4	Aveley (P)	164
4	Romford (N)	3–4	Maidstone United (P)	80
5	Ramsgate (S)	2–2	Dartford (P)	177
Dartford advance 5–4 on penalties
6	Tonbridge Angels (P)	4–1	Whitstable Town (S)	181
7	Thamesmead Town (N)	0–1	Sittingbourne (S)	71
8	Ashford Town (Kent) (S)	0–1	Tilbury (N)	61
9	VCD Athletic (N)	0–1	Margate (P)	91
10	Chatham Town (S)	2–0	Cray Wanderers (P)	94
11	Ware (N)	1–2	Waltham Forest (N)	73
12	Leyton (N)	0–2	Billericay Town (P)	77
13	AFC Hornchurch (P)	2–1	Brentwood Town (N)	121
14	Heybridge Swifts (N)	1–3	Maldon Town (N)	118
15	Redbridge (N)	2–3 (a.e.t.)	Harlow Town (N)	44
16	Concord Rangers (N)	3–0	East Thurrock United (N)	110
17	Canvey Island (P)	1–0	Great Wakering Rovers (N)	121
18	Lowestoft Town (N)	3–1	Ilford (N)	462

Tie	Home team (tier)	Score	Away team (tier)	Att.
19	Croydon Athletic (S)	2–0	Corinthian-Casuals (S)	81
20	Worthing (S)	0–4	Bognor Regis Town (P)	358
21	Chipstead (S)	1–2	Godalming Town (S)	55
22	Eastbourne Town (S)	1–3	Horsham YMCA (S)	78
23	Horsham (P)	2–1	Sutton United (P)	144
24	Carshalton Athletic (P)	1–3	Whyteleafe (S)	160
25	Leatherhead (S)	1–0 (a.e.t.)	Burgess Hill Town (S)	58
26	Hastings United (P)	4–1	Tooting & Mitcham United (P)	257
27	Fleet Town (S)	1–0	Ashford Town (Middx) (P)	60
28	Metropolitan Police (S)	2–1 (a.e.t.)	Harrow Borough (P)	47
29	Hendon (P)	3–3	Wingate & Finchley (N)	83
Wingate & Finchley advance 4–3 on penalties
30	Wealdstone (P)	3–1	Boreham Wood (P)	101
31	Northwood (N)	2–3	Potters Bar Town (N)	72
32	Enfield Town (N)	3–1	Waltham Abbey (P)	107
33	Walton Casuals (S)	4–3	Kingstonian (P)	133
34	Walton & Hersham (S)	2–1	Dulwich Hamlet (S)	88

=== Third round ===
Tie	Home team (tier)	Score	Away team (tier)	Att.
35	Sittingbourne (S)	3–2	Margate (P)	130
36	Dartford (P)	4–5	Aveley (P)	320
37	Maidstone United (P)	0–2	Tilbury (N)	63
38	Tonbridge Angels (P)	2–0	Chatham Town (S)	190
39	Waltham Forest (N)	0–1	Canvey Island (P)	44
40	Concord Rangers (N)	2–0	Billericay Town (P)	126
Concord Rangers expelled for fielding an unregistered player so Billericay Town advance
41	AFC Hornchurch (P)	3–0	Harlow Town (N)	104
42	Maldon Town (N)	0–3	Lowestoft Town (N)	65

Tie	Home team (tier)	Score	Away team (tier)	Att.
43	Hastings United (P)	0–1	Croydon Athletic (S)	139
44	Leatherhead (S)	2–0	Bognor Regis Town (P)	121
45	Whyteleafe (S)	1–2	Godalming Town (S)	62
46	Horsham (P)	0–2	Horsham YMCA (S)	161
47	Wealdstone (P)	2–2	Metropolitan Police (S)	101
Wealdstone advance 3–1 on penalties
48	Fleet Town (S)	2–0	Potters Bar Town (N)	53
49	Walton & Hersham (S)	2–0	Walton Casuals (S)	110
50	Wingate & Finchley (N)	2–1	Enfield Town (N)	69

=== Fourth round ===
Tie	Home team (tier)	Score	Away team (tier)	Att.
51	Lowestoft Town (N)	2–1	Tilbury (N)	422
52	Billericay Town (P)	1–3	Sittingbourne (S)	105
53	Aveley (P)	3–1 (a.e.t.)	AFC Hornchurch (P)	104
54	Canvey Island (P)	3–2	Wingate & Finchley (N)	97

Tie	Home team (tier)	Score	Away team (tier)	Att.
55	Tonbridge Angels (P)	2–1	Wealdstone (P)	148
Tonbridge Angels expelled so Wealdstone advance
56	Walton & Hersham (S)	0–1	Croydon Athletic (S)	70
57	Fleet Town (S)	3–0	Horsham YMCA (S)	55
58	Godalming Town (S)	0–1	Leatherhead (S)	90

=== Quarterfinals ===
Tie	Home team (tier)	Score	Away team (tier)	Att.
59	Croydon Athletic (S)	2–1	Lowestoft Town (N)	58
60	Sittingbourne (S)	1–2	Wealdstone (P)	74

Tie	Home team (tier)	Score	Away team (tier)	Att.
61	Fleet Town (S)	0–3	Leatherhead (S)	77
62	Aveley (P)	2–1	Canvey Island (P)	104

=== Semifinals ===
Tie	Home team (tier)	Score	Away team (tier)	Att.
63	Leatherhead (S)	1–1	Aveley (P)	105
Leatherhead advance 4–3 on penalties
64	Wealdstone (P)	1–0	Croydon Athletic (S)	113

=== Final ===
24 March 2010

Leatherhead (S)	0–0	Wealdstone (P)
Penalties
	4–3

Imber Court, Molesey
Attendance: 688

== See also ==
- Isthmian League
- 2009–10 Northern Premier League
- 2009–10 Southern Football League
