= 2002–03 Combined Counties Football League =

The 2002–03 Combined Counties Football League season was the 25th in the history of the Combined Counties Football League, a football competition in England. It was AFC Wimbledon's first season as a fan owned club, having reformed after Wimbledon FC opted to move to Milton Keynes and became the MK Dons.

AFC Wallingford's 115 points without winning the league is considered the most points ever accumulated by a runner-up in any football league. AFC Wimbledon's 111 points is the second most points ever won by a non-winner in any football league competition.

== League table ==
Combined Counties Football League
- Season: 2002–03
- Champions: Withdean 2000
- Matches: 552
- Goals: 2,036 (3.69 per match)

The league featured 21 clubs from the previous season, along with three new clubs:

- AFC Wimbledon, new club formed after Wimbledon F.C. was relocated to Milton Keynes
- Frimley Green, joined from the Surrey County Senior League
- North Greenford United

=== League table ===
| Pos | Team | Pld | W | D | L | GF | GA | GD | Pts | Promotion or relegation |
|---|---|---|---|---|---|---|---|---|---|---|
| 1 | Withdean 2000 | 46 | 40 | 4 | 2 | 143 | 32 | +111 | 124 | |
| 2 | AFC Wallingford | 46 | 37 | 4 | 5 | 129 | 33 | +96 | 115 | |
| 3 | AFC Wimbledon | 46 | 36 | 3 | 7 | 125 | 46 | +79 | 111 | |
| 4 | Feltham | 46 | 25 | 10 | 11 | 101 | 48 | +53 | 85 | |
| 5 | Bedfont | 46 | 25 | 5 | 16 | 106 | 73 | +33 | 80 | |
| 6 | Sandhurst Town | 46 | 23 | 9 | 14 | 86 | 57 | +29 | 78 | |
| 7 | Godalming & Guildford | 46 | 25 | 3 | 18 | 95 | 75 | +20 | 78 | |
| 8 | Raynes Park Vale | 46 | 24 | 5 | 17 | 101 | 79 | +22 | 77 | |
| 9 | Ash United | 46 | 23 | 5 | 18 | 110 | 83 | +27 | 74 | |
| 10 | North Greenford United | 46 | 22 | 7 | 17 | 104 | 87 | +17 | 73 | |
| 11 | Hartley Wintney | 46 | 23 | 4 | 19 | 88 | 84 | +4 | 73 | |
| 12 | Southall | 46 | 19 | 11 | 16 | 91 | 77 | +14 | 68 | |
| 13 | Westfield | 46 | 19 | 9 | 18 | 75 | 86 | −11 | 66 | |
| 14 | Chessington & Hook United | 46 | 18 | 9 | 19 | 96 | 80 | +16 | 63 | |
| 15 | Reading Town | 46 | 18 | 6 | 22 | 67 | 79 | −12 | 60 | |
| 16 | Chipstead | 46 | 16 | 10 | 20 | 92 | 87 | +5 | 58 | |
| 17 | Merstham | 46 | 16 | 10 | 20 | 61 | 80 | −19 | 58 | |
| 18 | Walton Casuals | 46 | 12 | 10 | 24 | 60 | 95 | −35 | 46 | |
| 19 | Chessington United | 46 | 13 | 6 | 27 | 54 | 84 | −30 | 45 | |
| 20 | Frimley Green | 46 | 13 | 5 | 28 | 65 | 98 | −33 | 44 | |
| 21 | Cobham | 46 | 11 | 10 | 25 | 61 | 108 | −47 | 40 (Note: Cobham were deducted three points.) | |
| 22 | Farnham Town | 46 | 5 | 9 | 32 | 45 | 130 | −85 | 24 | |
| 23 | Cove | 46 | 5 | 6 | 35 | 46 | 160 | −114 | 21 | |
| 24 | Viking Greenford | 46 | 3 | 2 | 41 | 35 | 175 | −140 | 8 (Note: Viking Greenford were deducted three points.) | Club folded |

Source: fchd.info
Rules for classification: 1) points; 2) goal difference; 3) number of goals scored.
