= 2003–04 Combined Counties Football League =

The 2003–04 Combined Counties Football League season was the 26th in the history of the Combined Counties Football League, a football competition in England. This season saw the league expanded to two divisions after the Surrey County Senior League was adsorbed by the Combined Counties League and became new Division One.

== Premier Division ==
Combined Counties Football League Premier Division
- Season: 2003–04
- Champions: AFC Wimbledon
- Promoted: AFC Wimbledon
- Matches: 552
- Goals: 1,975 (3.58 per match)

The Premier Division featured 23 clubs from the previous season, along with one new club:

- Horley Town, joined from the Surrey County Senior League

=== League table ===
Pos	Team	Pld	W	D	L	GF	GA	GD	Pts	Promotion or relegation
1	AFC Wimbledon	46	42	4	0	180	32	+148	130	Promoted to the Isthmian League Division One
2	AFC Wallingford	46	32	7	7	114	43	+71	103	
3	Reading Town	46	28	10	8	79	46	+33	94	
4	Southall	46	29	5	12	121	55	+66	92	
5	Sandhurst Town	46	27	11	8	109	60	+49	92	
6	Bedfont	46	26	11	9	94	62	+32	92 (Note: Bedfont were awarded three points.)	
7	Walton Casuals	46	25	9	12	112	64	+48	84	
8	Chipstead	46	26	6	14	92	57	+35	84	
9	Ash United	46	23	11	12	103	68	+35	80	
10	Chessington & Hook United	46	21	8	17	94	75	+19	71	
11	Godalming & Guildford	46	20	9	17	65	61	+4	69	
12	Merstham	46	20	9	17	63	67	−4	69	
13	Feltham	46	19	6	21	82	67	+15	63	
14	North Greenford United	46	18	6	22	80	91	−11	60	
15	Hartley Wintney	46	17	7	22	77	111	−34	55 (Note: Hartley Wintney were deducted three points.)	
16	Raynes Park Vale	46	12	9	25	72	94	−22	45	
17	Horley Town	46	12	8	26	67	94	−27	44	
18	Cobham	46	12	8	26	57	114	−57	44	
19	Westfield	46	11	10	25	53	88	−35	40 (Note: Westfield were deducted three points.)	
20	Frimley Green	46	9	10	27	53	109	−56	37	
21	Withdean 2000	46	8	7	31	62	115	−53	34 (Note: Withdean were awarded three points.)	Club folded
22	Farnham Town	46	8	4	34	44	125	−81	28	
23	Chessington United	46	7	6	33	52	140	−88	27	
24	Cove	46	7	5	34	50	137	−87	26	

Source: nonleaguematters
Rules for classification: 1) points; 2) goal difference; 3) number of goals scored.

== Division One ==
Combined Counties Football League Division One
- Season: 2003–04
- Champions: AFC Guildford
- Promoted: AFC Guildford; Colliers Wood United
- Matches: 306
- Goals: 1,131 (3.7 per match)

This season the league was expanded to two divisions after the Surrey County Senior League was absorbed by the Combined Counties League.

=== League table ===
Pos	Team	Pld	W	D	L	GF	GA	GD	Pts	Promotion
1	AFC Guildford	34	26	5	3	98	26	+72	83	Promoted to the Premier Division
2	Colliers Wood United	34	25	3	6	93	27	+66	78	Promoted to the Premier Division
3	Bookham	34	20	8	6	73	35	+38	75 (Note: Bookham were awarded seven points.)	
4	Hersham Royal British Legion	34	20	4	10	76	37	+39	64	
5	Coney Hall	34	19	7	8	81	43	+38	64	
6	Merrow	34	19	6	9	76	50	+26	63	
7	Farleigh Rovers	34	16	11	7	56	32	+24	59	
8	Staines Lammas	34	16	6	12	80	49	+31	53 (Note: Staines Lammas were deducted one point.)	
9	Worcester Park	34	17	2	15	63	53	+10	53	
10	Ditton	34	15	6	13	82	66	+16	51	
11	Monotype	34	13	7	14	59	68	−9	46	
12	Seelec Delta	34	12	9	13	60	57	+3	41 (Note: Seelec Delta were deducted four points.)	
13	Crescent Rovers	34	12	4	18	51	71	−20	40	
14	Shottermill & Haslemere	34	9	5	20	48	67	−19	32	
15	Netherne Village	34	9	4	21	40	72	−32	31	
16	Chobham & Ottershaw	34	4	6	24	26	105	−79	18	
17	Sheerwater	34	3	4	27	40	120	−80	10 (Note: Sheerwater were deducted three points.)	
18	Cranleigh	34	2	1	31	29	153	−124	10 (Note: Cranleigh were awarded three points.)	

Source: nonleaguematters
Rules for classification: 1) points; 2) goal difference; 3) number of goals scored.
