= Croydon Athletic F.C. =

Croydon Athletic
- Full name: Croydon Athletic Football Club
- Nickname: The Rams
- Founded: 1986 (as Wandsworth & Norwood)
- Dissolved: 2011
- Ground: Keith Tuckey Stadium; Mayfield Road; Thornton Heath
- Capacity: 3,000 (300 seated)
- 2011–12: Isthmian League; Division One South, resigned
Home colours	Away colours

Croydon Athletic Football Club was an English football club based in Thornton Heath in the London Borough of Croydon, London, England. It was founded in 1986 and initially named as Wandsworth & Norwood until 1990. The club progressed through various leagues, eventually winning the Isthmian League Division Three in 2001-02 and Division One South in 2009–10. In 2008, property developer Mazhar Majeed bought the club. However, in 2010, allegations of Majeed's involvement in spot-fixing and money-laundering led to turmoil within the club, including management resignations, player departures, and the chairman's suicide. By 2011, the club was effectively defunct. Fans formed AFC Croydon Athletic, which joined the Combined Counties Football League. Croydon Athletic played at the Keith Tuckey Stadium in Thornton Heath.

== History ==
Founded in 1986, the club was a merger between Wandsworth F.C. and Norwood F.C. and was initially named Wandsworth & Norwood until 1990 when the club's name was changed to Croydon Athletic FC. Norwood FC had in the past played at Herne Hill Velodrome, with an annual friendly hosted against Dutch giants Ajax Amsterdam. Wandsworth FC was an old club which had spent most of its long history playing on Wandsworth Common.

The merged club initially played in the London Spartan League, where they were promoted to the Premier Division in 1986–87. In 1988–89 they missed out on the Premier Division title on goal difference. In 1993–94 they finished as runners-up again and applied to join the Isthmian League but were rejected due to the state of their ground. The following year they finally won the league title but again were refused promotion. In 1996–97 they finished in third place and after extensive ground redevelopment were finally able to join the Isthmian League.

In 2001–02 the team won the championship of the Isthmian League Division Three, scoring 138 goals in 42 games. Due to league reorganisation, this saw them placed in the new Division One South, where they remained until they won the title in 2009–10.

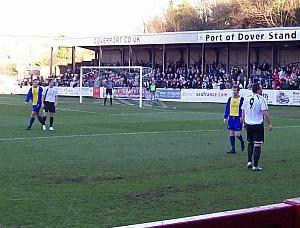
Croydon Athletic (yellow and blue shirts) playing Dover Athletic in 2008

The club was bought in 2008 by Mazhar Majeed, a UK-based property developer and agent for several members of the Pakistan national cricket team. In 2010, following allegations that Majeed was involved in spot-fixing during the Pakistan cricket tour of England, Croydon Athletic were investigated by HM Revenues and Customs due to allegations that Majeed had been using the club for money-laundering purposes, after Majeed was recorded by an undercover journalist stating that was his only reason for purchasing the club. This led to the manager and his assistant leaving the club after a match on 4 September 2010. The following day the club announced on its website that upcoming league and cup games were being postponed, resulting in the team forfeiting an FA Cup match. Following these events squad members began to transfer to other teams, with the club's official website referring to an "exodus from the KT Stadium". On 2 October 2010 the club chairman, David Le Cluse, was found dead, with a bullet wound, having committed suicide in a garage in Sutton.

The club received a £7,500 fine and a ten-point deduction after a case of financial irregularities was proven on 8 December 2011. The club had been charged with twenty-four breaches of FA Rule E1(b) in relation to the 2009/10 season. On 10 December the club was unable to fulfil a fixture away to Ramsgate and stated that it would be unable to fulfil the following weekend's fixture either. This was owing to the Keith Tuckey stadium being locked up, the management team resigning, and most players having found clubs elsewhere. On 16 December the Croydon Advertiser stated that the club was effectively no more

Fans of the club formed AFC Croydon Athletic, which was accepted into the Combined Counties Football League Division One (Level 10, Step 6) for the 2012–13 season.

== Stadium ==
Croydon Athletic played at the Keith Tuckey Stadium in Thornton Heath. It is named after the chairman of the club from its foundation in 1986 until his death in March 2006.

== Club records ==
- Best league performance: 1st in Isthmian League Division One South, 2009–10
- Best FA Cup performance: 3rd qualifying round, 2003–04
- Best FA Trophy performance: 3rd qualifying round, 2005–06
- Best FA Vase performance: 4th round, 2000–01 and 2001–02
