= Longmead Stadium =

Football stadium in Tonbridge, Kent, England

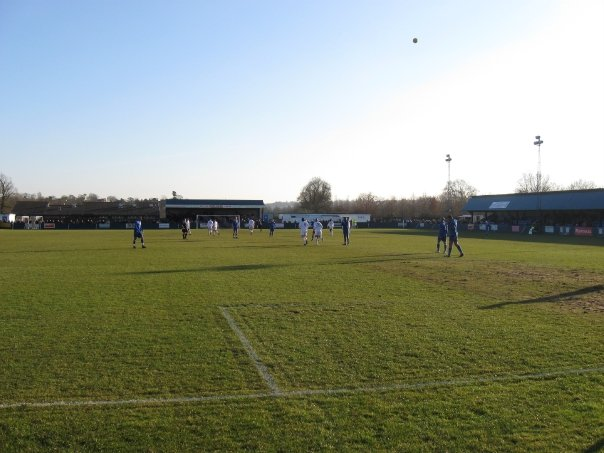
- The Longmead Stadium pictured in 2010
- Interactive map of Longmead Stadium
- Full name: Longmead Stadium
- Location: Tonbridge, England
- Coordinates: 51.2115°N 0.2691°E
- Owner: Tonbridge and Malling Borough Council
- Operator: Tonbridge Angels F.C.
- Capacity: 3,000 (720 seated)

Construction
- Opened: 1980

Tenant
- Tonbridge Angels

The Longmead Stadium is an association football stadium in Tonbridge, Kent, England. It is home to Tonbridge Angels, who currently compete in the National League South.

== History ==
The Longmead Stadium was built in 1980 by Tonbridge and Malling Borough Council after they had decided to redevelop Tonbridge Angels' Angel Ground in 1977 into a shopping centre. Tonbridge Angels were against the plans to evict them and demolish the Angel Ground and so took out a legal challenge against the plans. Three years later, the High Court ruled in favour of the council but after negotiations, the Council offered the club the Longmead Stadium as compensation. One of the stands at the Longmead Stadium was named "The Jack Maddams Stand" after a former Tonbridge Angels striker who had died. In 2008, the Longmead Stadium hosted a charity match between an Alan Rodgers select XI and an All stars team that was captained by former Tottenham Hotspur player, Gary Stevens as well as Andy Townsend and Jason Cundy.

== Outside football ==
The Longmead Stadium was also used as the location of a temporary office for the Tunbridge Wells branch of the charity, Headway UK after they were obliged to move from their old location at Pembury Hospital due to redevelopment of the hospital. In April 2012, the Longmead Stadium hosted a beer festival intending to show a number of real ales from areas around clubs in the Conference South. It also hosts the West Kent Garden and Leisure show. The Longmead Stadium also hosts the annual Tonbridge fireworks displays to commemorate Guy Fawkes Night.
