= Whyteleafe F.C. =

Association football club in England

Coordinates: 51°18′17″N 0°4′47″W

Whyteleafe Football Club
- Full name: Whyteleafe Football Club
- Nickname(s): The Leafe
- Founded: 1946
- Dissolved: 2021
- Ground: Church Road, Whyteleafe
- Capacity: 2,000
Home colours	Away colours

Whyteleafe Football Club was an English football club based in Whyteleafe, Surrey. The club was established in 1946 and joined the Athenian League in 1981. The club was an FA Chartered Standard club affiliated to the Surrey County Football Association.

== History ==
Whyteleafe F.C. was formed in 1946, replacing another club, Whyteleafe Albion, which had existed before World War II. The new club initially played junior football in such local leagues as the Thornton Heath & District League, before gaining senior status and joining the Surrey Senior League in 1958, at which time they moved to the Church Road ground, which would remain their home until 2021.

Whyteleafe were Surrey Senior League champions on at least one occasion in the 1960s before switching to the London Spartan League in 1975. In 1981 they switched to the Athenian League and then in 1984 to the Isthmian League. In 1989 they were promoted to Division One, a level at which they played for 23 years (albeit with league reorganisations placing the team in Division One South from 2002 to 2004 and again in 2006). In 1999, they reached the First Round Proper of the FA Cup for the first time in their history and held Chester City to a 0–0 draw before losing the replay. At the end of the 2011–12 season the club were relegated from the Isthmian League to the Kent League. After one season of consolidation the club was promoted from the renamed Southern Counties East League back to the Isthmian League at the end of the 2013–14 season.

Ahead of the 2021–22 season, Whyteleafe announced that they had withdrawn from the Isthmian League, following the loss of their Church Road ground. In August 2021, a 'phoenix' club named AFC Whyteleafe was formed, securing a deal on Church Road. The club entered the Surrey South Eastern Combination.

== Ground ==
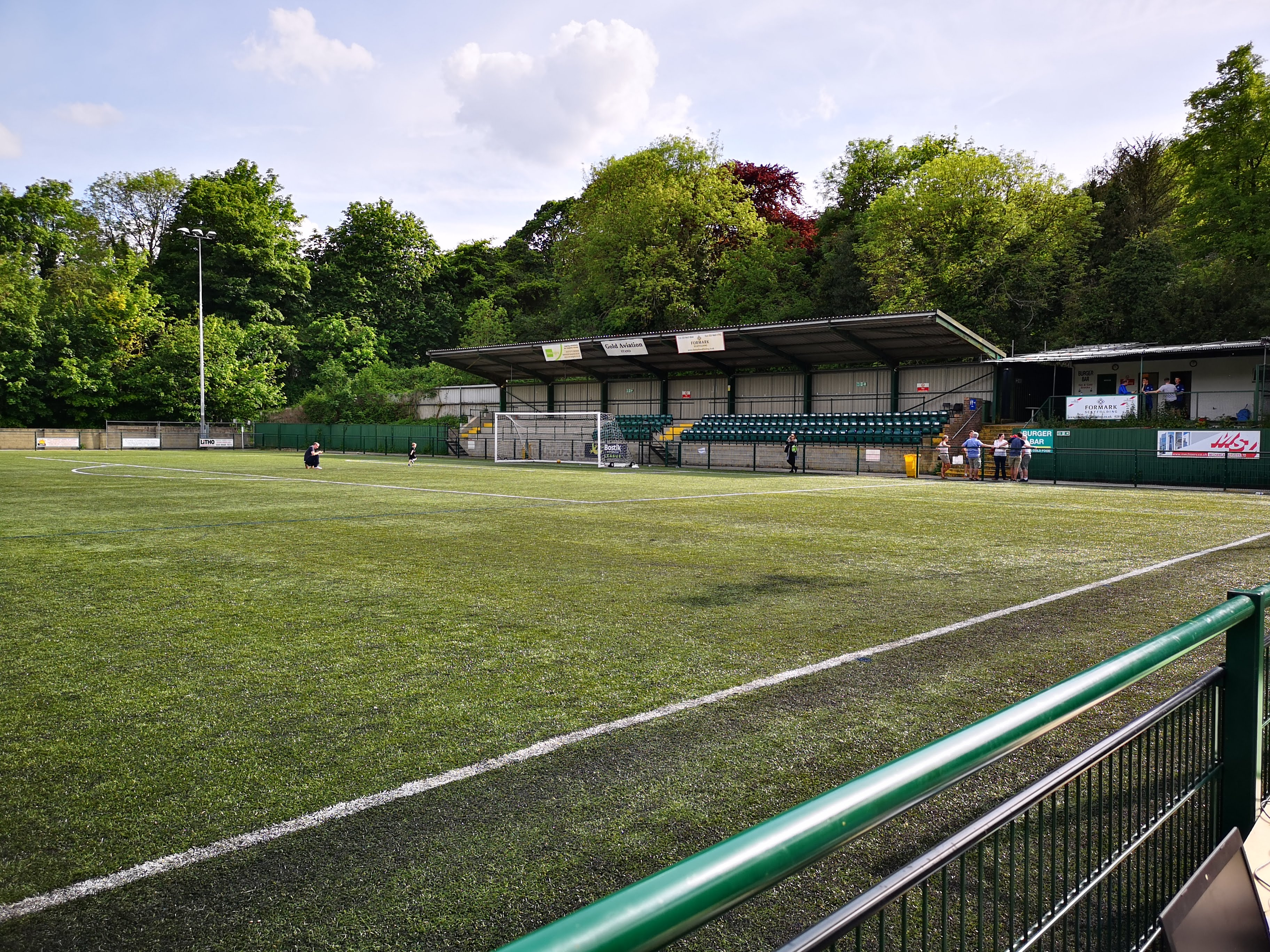
Church Road, the club's home ground

Whyteleafe played their home games at Church Road, Whyteleafe, Surrey, CR3 0AR until June 2021.

The site of Church Road was formerly farmland, and the farm's existing buildings were converted into the clubhouse and dressing rooms. The club originally planned to add a running track and cricket pitch to the complex, but these plans were abandoned. Floodlights were added in the early 1980s and a new main stand added in 1999 for the club's first round FA Cup match against Chester City, which saw a record attendance of 2,164. Some of the turnstiles added at the ground were purchased from Stoke City's Victoria Ground after they moved to the Britannia Stadium in 1997.

In June 2021, following the purchase of the ground by Singaporean-based company Irama, Whyteleafe left Church Road due to Irama refusing to negotiate a new lease with the club.

== Records ==
- Best league performance: Fifth in Isthmian League Division One South, 2002–03, 2014–15
- Best FA Cup performance: First round proper, 1999-00
- Best FA Trophy performance: Fourth round, 1998–99
- Best FA Vase performance: Fifth round, 1980–81, 1985–86
- Record attendance: 2,210 vs Chester City, FA Cup first round, 30 October 1999

== Honours ==
- Southern Counties East Football League:
  - Premier Division Champions (1): 2013–14
- Surrey Senior League:
  - Premier Division Champions (1): 1968–69
- Isthmian League:
  - Division Two South Runners-up (1): 1988–89
- Surrey Senior Cup:
  - Runners-up (2): 1987–88, 2007–08
- East Surrey Charity Cup :
  - Runners-up (1): 1977–78
- Surrey Junior Cup:
  - Runners-up (1): 1951–52
