= Chipstead F.C. =

Association football club in England

Coordinates: 51°17′32″N 0°10′13″W

Chipstead
- Full name: Chipstead Football Club
- Nickname: The Chips
- Founded: 1906
- Ground: High Road, Chipstead
- Capacity: 2,000 (150 seated)
- Chairman: Heather Armstrong
- Manager: Jordan Wilson
- League: Combined Counties League Premier Division South
- 2025–26: Combined Counties League Premier Division South, 17th of 20
Home colours	Away colours

Chipstead Football Club is a football club based in Chipstead, near Banstead, in Surrey, England. Affiliated to the Surrey County Football Association, they are currently members of the Combined Counties League Premier Division South and play at High Road.

== History ==
The club was established in 1906 after a team was formed by locals to play workers building Netherne Hospital. In 1962 the club joined the Surrey Intermediate League, where they played until joining the new Surrey Premier League in 1982. They were subsequently runners-up on three occasions and won the League Cup three times.

In 1986 Chipstead moved up to the Combined Counties League. They won the league's Challenge Trophy in the first season, and went on to win the title in 1989–90. They were runners-up the following season won the Challenge Trophy again in 1990–91. The 1992–93 season saw them finish as runners-up and win the Premier Division Challenge Cup, with the Challenge Cup won again in 1994–95. They were league runners-up again the following season. After winning the league for a second time in 2006–07 the club were promoted to Division One South of the Isthmian League. As a result of league reorganisation, they were placed in the South Central Division in 2018.

In 2023–24 Chipstead finished second-from-bottom of the South Central Division and were relegated to the Premier Division South of the Combined Counties League.

== Ground ==
The club play at High Road, which was originally part of the Shabden Park Farm estate owned by Lord Marshall. After World War II players changed in a cow shed until a new hut was brought in from Hookwood. The ground was bought from the local council in 1998. A 100-seat stand was erected in 2004 to replace an old wooden stand. There is also covered standing for 150 installed behind one goal. The ground currently has a capacity of 2,000, of which 150 is seated and 200 covered.

== Honours ==
- Combined Counties League
  - Premier Division champions 1989–90, 2006–07
  - Premier Division Challenge Cup winners 1992–93, 1994–95
  - Challenge Trophy winners 1986–87, 1990–91
- East Surrey Charity Cup
  - Winners 1960–61

== Records ==
- Best FA Cup performance: Fourth qualifying round, 2008–09
- Best FA Trophy performance: Second qualifying round, 2009–10
- Best FA Vase performance: Third round, 1997–98, 1998–99
- Record attendance: 1,170
- Most goals: Mick Nolan, 124

== See also ==
- Chipstead F.C. players
- Chipstead F.C. managers
