= 2004–05 Combined Counties Football League =

The 2004–05 Combined Counties Football League season was the 27th in the history of the Combined Counties Football League, a football competition in England.

== Premier Division ==
Combined Counties Football League Premier Division
- Season: 2004–05
- Champions: Walton Casuals
- Promoted: Walton Casuals
- Relegated: Hartley Wintney; AFC Wallingford
- Matches: 552
- Goals: 1,893 (3.43 per match)

The Premier Division featured two new teams in a league of 24 teams after the promotion of AFC Wimbledon to the Isthmian League.

- AFC Guildford, promoted from Division One
- Colliers Wood United, promoted from Division One

=== League table ===
Pos	Team	Pld	W	D	L	GF	GA	GD	Pts	Promotion or relegation
1	Walton Casuals	46	38	4	4	134	35	+99	118	Promoted to the Isthmian League Division One
2	North Greenford United	46	29	8	9	117	69	+48	92 (Note: North Greenford United were deducted three points.)	
3	Chessington & Hook United	46	26	13	7	117	61	+56	91	
4	Godalming & Guildford	46	28	7	11	107	59	+48	91	
5	Sandhurst Town	46	26	10	10	106	61	+45	88	
6	Bedfont	46	26	7	13	80	63	+17	85	
7	Horley Town	46	23	9	14	82	51	+31	78	
8	Chipstead	46	22	7	17	78	69	+9	73	
9	Raynes Park Vale	46	20	8	18	85	80	+5	68	
10	Westfield	46	19	9	18	68	67	+1	66	
11	Southall	46	20	6	20	75	83	−8	66	
12	AFC Guildford	46	20	6	20	73	82	−9	66	
13	Ash United	46	15	17	14	76	67	+9	62	
14	Colliers Wood United	46	17	10	19	89	82	+7	61	
15	Frimley Green	46	13	16	17	68	88	−20	58 (Note: Frimley Green were awarded three points.)	
16	Merstham	46	15	12	19	78	73	+5	57	
17	Feltham	46	16	9	21	71	83	−12	57	
18	Cobham	46	16	7	23	56	73	−17	55	
19	Reading Town	46	16	7	23	76	94	−18	49 (Note: Reading Town were deducted six points.)	
20	Cove	46	10	11	25	60	92	−32	44 (Note: Cove were awarded three points.)	
21	Farnham Town	46	11	7	28	48	85	−37	40	
22	Chessington United	46	7	8	31	62	133	−71	32 (Note: Chessington United were awarded three points.)	
23	Hartley Wintney	46	6	13	27	44	110	−66	31	Relegated to Division One
24	AFC Wallingford	46	5	5	36	43	133	−90	20	Relegated to Division One

Source: fchd.
Rules for classification: 1) points; 2) goal difference; 3) number of goals scored.

== Division One ==
Combined Counties Football League Division One
- Season: 2004–05
- Champions: Coney Hall
- Promoted: Bedfont Green
- Matches: 306
- Goals: 1,250 (4.08 per match)

Division One featured two new teams in a league of 18 teams:

- Bedfont Green, joined from the Surrey County Intermediate League (Western)
- Warlingham, joined from the Surrey South Eastern Combination

Also, Chobham & Ottershaw changed their name to Chobham.

=== League table ===
Pos	Team	Pld	W	D	L	GF	GA	GD	Pts	Promotion or relegation
1	Coney Hall	34	28	5	1	111	41	+70	89	
2	Bedfont Green	34	24	7	3	101	36	+65	82 (Note: Bedfont Green were awarded three points.)	Promoted to the Premier Division
3	Bookham	34	24	3	7	99	37	+62	77 (Note: Bookham were awarded two points.)	
4	Warlingham	34	21	9	4	93	32	+61	72	
5	Farleigh Rovers	34	21	4	9	84	44	+40	67	
6	Worcester Park	34	17	7	10	87	45	+42	61 (Note: Worcester Park were awarded three points.)	
7	Crescent Rovers	34	18	6	10	70	62	+8	60	
8	Staines Lammas	34	15	6	13	74	55	+19	55 (Note: Staines Lammas were awarded four points.)	
9	Seelec Delta	34	15	5	14	86	55	+31	50	Resigned from the league
10	Sheerwater	34	13	8	13	75	68	+7	47	
11	Monotype	34	13	4	17	62	78	−16	42 (Note: Monotype were deducted one point.)	
12	Ditton	34	8	7	19	41	71	−30	30 (Note: Ditton were deducted one point.)	Resigned from the league
13	Merrow	34	7	6	21	49	71	−22	29 (Note: Merrow were awarded two points.)	
14	Chobham	34	8	3	23	49	109	−60	29 (Note: Chobham were awarded two points.)	
15	Netherne Village	34	8	4	22	60	103	−43	27 (Note: Netherne Village were deducted one point.)	
16	Shottermill & Haslemere	34	6	5	23	31	94	−63	23	
17	Hersham Royal British Legion	34	6	8	20	51	81	−30	19 (Note: Hersham Royal British Legion were deducted seven points.)	Resigned from the league
18	Cranleigh	34	5	1	28	27	168	−141	16	Resigned from the league

Source: fchd.
Rules for classification: 1) points; 2) goal difference; 3) number of goals scored.
