= 2007–08 Combined Counties Football League =

The 2007–08 Combined Counties Football League season was the 30th in the history of the Combined Counties Football League, a football competition in England.

== Premier Division ==
Combined Counties Football League Premier Division
- Season: 2007–08
- Champions: Merstham
- Promoted: Merstham
- Relegated: Dorking
- Matches: 462
- Goals: 1,588 (3.44 per match)

The Premier Division featured one new team in a league of 22 teams after the promotion of Chipstead to the Isthmian League:

- Horley Town, promoted from Division One

=== League table ===
Pos	Team	Pld	W	D	L	GF	GA	GD	Pts	Promotion or relegation
1	Merstham	42	35	6	1	114	21	+93	110 (Note: Merstham were deducted one point.)	Promoted to the Isthmian League Division One South
2	Guildford City	42	25	7	10	88	45	+43	82	
3	Camberley Town	42	24	7	11	83	54	+29	79	
4	Cove	42	22	6	14	75	58	+17	72	
5	Horley Town	42	20	9	13	66	59	+7	69	
6	North Greenford United	42	20	8	14	75	58	+17	68	
7	Colliers Wood United	42	18	10	14	86	75	+11	64	
8	Chertsey Town	42	19	5	18	81	85	−4	62	
9	Bedfont Green	42	17	10	15	82	67	+15	61	
10	Epsom & Ewell	42	16	13	13	66	58	+8	61	
11	Chessington & Hook United	42	17	9	16	76	68	+8	60	
12	Egham Town	42	15	13	14	80	75	+5	58	
13	Reading Town	42	16	8	18	67	62	+5	55 (Note: Reading Town were deducted one point.)	Transferred to the Hellenic League
14	Wembley	42	14	10	18	49	55	−6	52	
15	Ash United	42	15	6	21	78	87	−9	51	
16	Sandhurst Town	42	14	9	19	63	89	−26	51	
17	Banstead Athletic	42	14	8	20	79	99	−20	50	
18	Bookham	42	12	8	22	64	94	−30	44	
19	Raynes Park Vale	42	9	14	19	56	85	−29	41	
20	Bedfont	42	11	8	23	55	101	−46	41	
21	Cobham	42	10	7	25	60	93	−33	37	
22	Dorking	42	6	5	31	45	100	−55	23	Relegated to Division One

Source: fchd.
Rules for classification: 1) points; 2) goal difference; 3) number of goals scored.

== Division One ==
Combined Counties Football League Division One
- Season: 2007–08
- Champions: Staines Lammas
- Promoted: Hartley Wintney
- Matches: 368
- Goals: 1,428 (3.88 per match)

Division One featured two new teams in a league of 20 teams:

- Knaphill, joined from the Surrey County Intermediate League (Western)
- Neasden Foundation

Also, Coulsdon Town and Salfords merged to form Coulsdon United.

=== League table ===
Pos	Team	Pld	W	D	L	GF	GA	GD	Pts	Promotion or relegation
1	Staines Lammas	37	28	3	6	111	28	+83	87	
2	Hanworth Villa	38	25	9	4	124	38	+86	84	
3	Hartley Wintney	38	24	8	6	87	38	+49	80	Promoted to the Premier Division
4	Westfield	38	24	6	8	86	40	+46	78	
5	Farnham Town	38	19	10	9	88	57	+31	67	
6	Frimley Green	38	19	6	13	71	53	+18	63	
7	Knaphill	37	18	7	12	77	72	+5	61	
8	Warlingham	37	16	10	11	95	65	+30	58	
9	Worcester Park	37	17	5	15	70	57	+13	56	
10	CB Hounslow United	37	17	5	15	76	65	+11	56	
11	Chobham	37	16	5	16	72	77	−5	53	
12	South Park	37	12	9	16	79	75	+4	45	
13	Feltham	38	12	7	19	57	77	−20	43	
14	Neasden Foundation	26	14	0	12	49	45	+4	42 (Note: Neasden Foundation resigned with 12 matches remaining. These matches remained unplayed and their record was not expunged.)	Expelled from the league
15	Crescent Rovers	37	12	4	21	50	84	−34	40	
16	Sheerwater	37	10	6	21	63	113	−50	36	
17	Tongham	38	9	5	24	59	99	−40	32	Resigned to the Surrey Elite Intermediate League
18	Farleigh Rovers	38	8	7	23	39	76	−37	31	
19	Coulsdon United	37	8	4	25	51	99	−48	28	
20	Merrow	36	1	2	33	24	170	−146	5	Resigned to the Surrey County Intermediate League (Western)

Source: fchd.
Rules for classification: 1) points; 2) goal difference; 3) number of goals scored.
