= 2005–06 Combined Counties Football League =

The 2005–06 Combined Counties Football League season was the 28th in the history of the Combined Counties Football League, a football competition in England.

== Premier Division ==
Combined Counties Football League Premier Division
- Season: 2005–06
- Champions: Godalming Town
- Promoted: Godalming Town
- Relegated: 5 clubs
- Matches: 420
- Goals: 1,355 (3.23 per match)

The Premier Division featured one new team in a league of 22 teams after the promotion of Walton Casuals to the Isthmian League.

- Bedfont Green, promoted from Division One

Also:

- AFC Guildford changed name to Guildford United
- Chessington United changed name to Mole Valley Predators
- Godalming & Guildford changed name to Godalming Town

=== League table ===
| Pos | Team | Pld | W | D | L | GF | GA | GD | Pts | Promotion or relegation |
|---|---|---|---|---|---|---|---|---|---|---|
| 1 | Godalming Town | 40 | 30 | 7 | 3 | 99 | 33 | +66 | 97 | Promoted to the Isthmian League Division One South |
| 2 | Merstham | 40 | 24 | 9 | 7 | 64 | 26 | +38 | 81 | |
| 3 | Ash United | 40 | 21 | 8 | 11 | 73 | 43 | +30 | 71 | |
| 4 | Colliers Wood United | 40 | 22 | 4 | 14 | 93 | 63 | +30 | 66 | |
| 5 | Horley Town | 40 | 20 | 9 | 11 | 54 | 41 | +13 | 69 | Relegated to Division One |
| 6 | Bedfont | 40 | 19 | 10 | 11 | 69 | 45 | +24 | 67 | |
| 7 | Sandhurst Town | 40 | 18 | 12 | 10 | 77 | 50 | +27 | 66 | |
| 8 | Chessington & Hook United | 40 | 17 | 12 | 11 | 82 | 46 | +36 | 63 (Note: Chessington & Hook United were deducted four points.) | |
| 9 | Raynes Park Vale | 40 | 18 | 3 | 19 | 71 | 82 | −11 | 57 | |
| 10 | Reading Town | 40 | 15 | 9 | 16 | 65 | 59 | +6 | 54 | |
| 11 | Westfield | 40 | 15 | 9 | 16 | 60 | 58 | +2 | 54 | Relegated to Division One |
| 12 | Mole Valley Predators | 40 | 16 | 5 | 19 | 65 | 90 | −25 | 53 | Resigned from the league |
| 13 | North Greenford United | 40 | 15 | 7 | 18 | 72 | 70 | +2 | 52 | |
| 14 | Chipstead | 40 | 13 | 10 | 17 | 56 | 65 | −9 | 49 | |
| 15 | Cobham | 40 | 12 | 8 | 20 | 55 | 60 | −5 | 44 | |
| 16 | Cove | 40 | 11 | 11 | 18 | 55 | 83 | −28 | 44 | |
| 17 | Guildford United | 40 | 11 | 9 | 20 | 53 | 83 | −30 | 42 | |
| 18 | Frimley Green | 40 | 11 | 8 | 21 | 45 | 78 | −33 | 41 | Relegated to Division One |
| 19 | Bedfont Green | 40 | 12 | 5 | 23 | 60 | 95 | −35 | 41 | |
| 20 | Feltham | 40 | 9 | 6 | 25 | 49 | 90 | −41 | 33 | Relegated to Division One |
| 21 | Farnham Town | 40 | 5 | 11 | 24 | 38 | 95 | −57 | 26 | Relegated to Division One |
| 22 | Southall | 0 | 0 | 0 | 0 | 0 | 0 | 0 | 0 | Resigned from the league, record expunged |

Source: fchd.
Rules for classification: 1) points; 2) goal difference; 3) number of goals scored.

== Division One ==
Combined Counties Football League Division One
- Season: 2005–06
- Champions: Warlingham
- Promoted: AFC Wallingford; Bookham
- Matches: 272
- Goals: 1,185 (4.36 per match)

Division One featured four new teams in a league of 17 teams:

- AFC Wallingford, relegated from the Premier Division
- Hanworth Villa, joined from the Middlesex County League
- Hartley Wintney, relegated from the Premier Division
- Tongham

Also, Netherne Village changed their name to Netherne.

=== League table ===
| Pos | Team | Pld | W | D | L | GF | GA | GD | Pts | Promotion or relegation |
|---|---|---|---|---|---|---|---|---|---|---|
| 1 | Warlingham | 32 | 25 | 4 | 3 | 102 | 37 | +65 | 79 | |
| 2 | AFC Wallingford | 32 | 24 | 2 | 6 | 90 | 38 | +52 | 74 | Promoted to Hellenic League Premier Division |
| 3 | Bookham | 32 | 22 | 7 | 3 | 113 | 33 | +80 | 73 | Promoted to the Premier Division |
| 4 | Worcester Park | 32 | 19 | 6 | 7 | 86 | 43 | +43 | 63 | |
| 5 | Hartley Wintney | 32 | 21 | 3 | 8 | 74 | 44 | +30 | 63 (Note: Hartley Wintney were deducted three points.) | |
| 6 | Tongham | 32 | 19 | 3 | 10 | 118 | 58 | +60 | 60 | |
| 7 | Hanworth Villa | 32 | 18 | 5 | 9 | 94 | 53 | +41 | 59 | |
| 8 | Coney Hall | 32 | 15 | 7 | 10 | 95 | 56 | +39 | 52 | |
| 9 | Farleigh Rovers | 32 | 13 | 5 | 14 | 55 | 57 | −2 | 44 | |
| 10 | Crescent Rovers | 32 | 13 | 5 | 14 | 56 | 65 | −9 | 44 | |
| 11 | Staines Lammas | 32 | 11 | 4 | 17 | 58 | 70 | −12 | 37 | |
| 12 | Sheerwater | 32 | 9 | 4 | 19 | 44 | 90 | −46 | 31 | |
| 13 | Monotype | 32 | 8 | 6 | 18 | 45 | 89 | −44 | 30 | |
| 14 | Merrow | 32 | 6 | 2 | 24 | 47 | 114 | −67 | 20 | |
| 15 | Chobham | 32 | 5 | 4 | 23 | 34 | 108 | −74 | 19 | |
| 16 | Shottermill & Haslemere | 32 | 5 | 3 | 24 | 36 | 98 | −62 | 18 | Resigned to the Surrey County Intermediate League (Western) |
| 17 | Netherne | 32 | 3 | 2 | 27 | 38 | 132 | −94 | 11 | |

Source: fchd.
Rules for classification: 1) points; 2) goal difference; 3) number of goals scored.
