= 2006–07 Combined Counties Football League =

The 2006–07 Combined Counties Football League season was the 29th in the history of the Combined Counties Football League, a football competition in England.

== Premier Division ==
Combined Counties Football League Premier Division
- Season: 2006–07
- Champions: Chipstead
- Promoted: Chipstead
- Matches: 462
- Goals: 1,507 (3.26 per match)

The Premier Division featured eight new teams in a league of 22 teams after the promotion of Godalming Town to the Isthmian League.

- Teams joining from disbanded Isthmian League Division Two:
  - Camberley Town
  - Chertsey Town
  - Dorking
  - Egham Town
  - Epsom & Ewell
  - Wembley
- Plus:
  - Banstead Athletic, demoted from Isthmian League Division One
  - Bookham, promoted from Division One

Also Guildford United changed their name to Guildford City.

=== League table ===
Pos	Team	Pld	W	D	L	GF	GA	GD	Pts	Promotion or relegation
1	Chipstead	42	32	3	7	114	48	+66	99	Promoted to the Isthmian League Division One South
2	Merstham	42	31	2	9	100	35	+65	95	
3	Wembley	42	27	8	7	95	45	+50	89	
4	Ash United	42	26	8	8	86	37	+49	86	
5	North Greenford United	42	21	12	9	90	62	+28	75	
6	Banstead Athletic	42	20	10	12	76	64	+12	70	
7	Camberley Town	42	21	7	14	60	59	+1	70	
8	Chertsey Town	42	20	7	15	72	71	+1	67	
9	Reading Town	42	18	6	18	72	64	+8	60	
10	Egham Town	42	16	10	16	80	59	+21	58	
11	Chessington & Hook United	42	15	12	15	63	72	−9	57	
12	Sandhurst Town	42	15	10	17	61	67	−6	55	
13	Colliers Wood United	42	17	6	19	69	62	+7	54 (Note: Colliers Wood United were deducted three points.)	
14	Cobham	42	16	6	20	56	64	−8	54	
15	Raynes Park Vale	42	15	8	19	69	85	−16	53	
16	Dorking	42	16	7	19	65	73	−8	49 (Note: Dorking were deducted six points.)	
17	Epsom & Ewell	42	10	10	22	44	78	−34	40	
18	Cove	42	11	7	24	56	96	−40	39 (Note: Cove were deducted one point.)	
19	Bedfont Green	42	9	10	23	38	62	−24	37	
20	Bookham	42	10	6	26	54	105	−51	36	
21	Guildford City	42	8	4	30	46	96	−50	28	
22	Bedfont	42	6	5	31	41	103	−62	23	

Source: fchd.
Rules for classification: 1) points; 2) goal difference; 3) number of goals scored.

== Division One ==
Combined Counties Football League Division One
- Season: 2006–07
- Champions: Farnham Town
- Promoted: Horley Town
- Matches: 420
- Goals: 1,625 (3.87 per match)

Division One featured seven new teams in a league of 21 teams.

- Teams joining from the Middlesex County League:
  - CB Hounslow United
  - South Park
- Teams relegated from the Premier Division:
  - Farnham Town
  - Feltham
  - Frimley Green
  - Horley Town
  - Westfield

Also, Monotype changed their name to Salfords and Netherne changed their name to Coulsdon Town.

=== League table ===
Pos	Team	Pld	W	D	L	GF	GA	GD	Pts	Promotion or relegation
1	Farnham Town	40	27	8	5	84	33	+51	89	
2	Horley Town	40	27	7	6	104	31	+73	88	Promoted to the Premier Division
3	Worcester Park	40	27	7	6	100	53	+47	88	
4	Warlingham	40	25	8	7	97	42	+55	83	
5	Staines Lammas	40	23	11	6	104	45	+59	80	
6	Hanworth Villa	40	25	7	8	101	44	+57	79 (Note: Hanworth Villa were deducted three points.)	
7	South Park	40	18	7	15	75	61	+14	61	
8	Farleigh Rovers	40	15	12	13	58	56	+2	57	
9	Feltham	40	17	4	19	73	78	−5	55	
10	Westfield	40	15	9	16	82	62	+20	54	
11	Sheerwater	40	14	12	14	88	93	−5	54	
12	CB Hounslow United	40	14	7	19	74	79	−5	49	
13	Frimley Green	40	14	7	19	70	76	−6	49	
14	Coney Hall	40	14	9	17	75	82	−7	49 (Note: Coney Hall were deducted two points.)	Resigned from the league
15	Chobham	40	15	3	22	82	104	−22	48	
16	Hartley Wintney	40	13	7	20	71	92	−21	46	
17	Crescent Rovers	40	12	5	23	66	86	−20	41	
18	Salfords	40	10	3	27	42	108	−66	33	Merged into Coulsdon Town
19	Tongham	40	7	9	24	67	130	−63	30	
20	Merrow	40	7	5	28	49	116	−67	26	
21	Coulsdon Town	40	6	3	31	63	154	−91	21	

Source: fchd.
Rules for classification: 1) points; 2) goal difference; 3) number of goals scored.
