= 2007–08 FA Cup qualifying rounds =

Tournament details
- Country: England; Wales

The 2007–08 FA Cup qualifying rounds opened the 127th season of competition in England for 'The Football Association Challenge Cup' (FA Cup), the world's oldest association football single knockout competition. A total of 729 clubs were accepted for the competition, up 42 from the previous season's 687.

The large number of clubs entering the tournament from lower down (Levels 5 through 10) in the English football pyramid meant that the competition started with six rounds of preliminary (2) and qualifying (4) knockouts for these non-League teams. The 32 winning teams from fourth qualifying round progressed to the First round proper, where League teams tiered at Levels 3 and 4 entered the competition.

== Calendar ==
The calendar for the 2007–08 FA Cup qualifying rounds, as announced by The FA.

Round	Start date	Leagues entering at this round	New entries this round	Winners from previous round	Number of fixtures	Prize money
Extra preliminary round	18 August 2007	Levels 9-10	342	none	171	£500
Preliminary round	1 September 2007	Level 8	161	171	166	£1,000
First qualifying round	15 September 2007	Level 7	66	166	116	£2,250
Second qualifying round	29 September 2007	Conference North; Conference South	44	116	80	£3,750
Third qualifying round	13 October 2007	none	none	80	40	£5,000
Fourth qualifying round	27 October 2007	Conference Premier	24	40	32	£10,000

== Extra preliminary round ==
Matches played on the weekend of Saturday 18 August 2007. 342 clubs from Level 9 and Level 10 of English football, entered at this stage of the competition, while other 38 clubs from levels 9 and 10 get a bye to the preliminary round.

Tie	Home team (tier)	Score	Away team (tier)	Att.
1	Guisborough Town (10)	1–3	Norton & Stockton Ancients (10)	144
2	West Auckland Town (9)	2–1	Bedlington Terriers (9)	49
3	Billingham Town (9)	6–1	Eccleshill United (9)	167
4	Winterton Rangers (9)	3–2	Armthorpe Welfare (9)	64
5	Glasshoughton Welfare (9)	1–1	Liversedge (9)	60
replay	Liversedge (9)	4–3	Glasshoughton Welfare (9)	160
6	Horden Colliery Welfare (10)	2–1	Sunderland Nissan (9)	50
7	Thackley (9)	0–1	Ashington (9)	109
8	Darlington Railway Athletic (10)	6–0	Yorkshire Amateur (10)	64
9	Whitley Bay (9)	0–1	Dunston Federation (9)	250
10	Hall Road Rangers (10)	6–1	Tadcaster Albion (10)	55
11	Spennymoor Town (9)	3–0	North Shields (10)	149
12	Hebburn Town (10)	1–3	Tow Law Town (9)	102
13	Crook Town (10)	2–2	Sunderland RCA (10)	64
replay	Sunderland RCA (10)	0–3	Crook Town (10)	32
14	Morpeth Town (9)	3–0	Seaham Red Star (9)	57
15	Pontefract Collieries (10)	0–0	Selby Town (9)	76
replay	Selby Town (9)	1–0	Pontefract Collieries (10)	123
16	Thornaby (10)	2–3	South Shields (10)	75
17	Jarrow Roofing Boldon CA (9)	2–1	West Allotment Celtic (9)	48
18	Brandon United (10)	0–5	Durham City (9)	96
19	Washington (9)	1–3	Pickering Town (9)	74
20	Esh Winning (10)	1–0	Whickham (10)	58
21	Ryton (10)	3–4	Silsden (9)	73
22	Billingham Synthonia (9)	2–1	Northallerton Town (9)	158
23	Bottesford Town (10)	1–2	Shildon (9)	103
24	Team Northumbria (10)	0–11	Consett (9)	72
25	Chester-le-Street Town (9)	1–1	Bishop Auckland (9)	105
replay	Bishop Auckland (9)	1–2	Chester-le-Street Town (9)	123
26	Ashton Town (10)	4–2	Ramsbottom United (9)	60
27	Daisy Hill (10)	0–4	Congleton Town (9)	40
28	AFC Emley (10)	3–0	Darwen (10)	266
29	Rossington Main (10)	2–2	Atherton Collieries (9)	81
replay	Atherton Collieries (9)	5–0	Rossington Main (10)	150
30	Chadderton (10)	3–4	Winsford United (9)	73
31	Holker Old Boys (10)	2–3	St Helens Town (9)	62
32	Blackpool Mechanics (10)	1–3	Maine Road (9)	42
33	Formby (9)	2–3	Oldham Town (10)	
34	Squires Gate (9)	1–3	Penrith Town (10)	37
35	Flixton (9)	2–1	Bootle (10)	49
36	Trafford (9)	1–0	Atherton Laburnum Rovers (9)	89
37	Hallam (9)	2–0	Nelson (9)	78
38	Salford City (9)	6–3	Padiham (10)	86
39	Abbey Hey (9)	1–2	Bacup Borough (9)	45
40	Brodsworth Welfare (9)	2–3	Parkgate (9)	35
41	Dinnington Town (10)	2–1	Maltby Main (9)	602
42	Glossop North End (9)	2–0	Eccleshall (10)	118
43	Highgate United (10)	2–1	Shirebrook Town (9)	66
44	Castle Vale (10)	3–3	Brierley Hill & Withymoor (10)	70
replay	Brierley Hill & Withymoor (10)	4–0	Castle Vale (10)	79
45	Loughborough Dynamo (9)	1–1	Stapenhill (9)	132
replay	Stapenhill (9)	1–2	Loughborough Dynamo (9)	103
46	Tividale (10)	1–4	Mickleover Sports (9)	42
47	Nuneaton Griff (10)	0–3	Rainworth Miners Welfare (10)	82
48	Pegasus Juniors (9)	0–0	New Mills (10)	48
replay	New Mills (10)	5–1	Pegasus Juniors (9)	222
49	Glapwell (9)	2–2	Dudley Town (10)	70
replay	Dudley Town (10)	0–5	Glapwell (9)	71
50	Shifnal Town (9)	1–1	Arnold Town (9)	92
replay	Arnold Town (9)	1–1 (5–6 p)	Shifnal Town (9)	176
51	Ledbury Town (10)	2–6	Boldmere St Michaels (9)	102
52	Oadby Town (9)	1–0	Racing Club Warwick (9)	89
53	Teversal (10)	2–2	Coventry Sphinx (9)	104
replay	Coventry Sphinx (9)	2–2 (5–6 p)	Teversal (10)	112
54	Market Drayton Town (9)	1–1	Studley (9)	51
replay	Studley (9)	0–4	Market Drayton Town (9)	
55	Long Eaton United (9)	2–1	Bridgnorth Town (10)	67
56	Coalville Town (9)	1–2	Rocester (9)	135
57	Gornal Athletic (10)	0–3	Meir KA (10)	58
58	Norton United (10)	1–1	Oldbury United (9)	50
replay	Oldbury United (9)	1–0	Norton United (10)	71
59	Westfields (9)	3–2	Friar Lane & Epworth (9)	97
60	Borrowash Victoria (10)	0–1	Biddulph Victoria (9)	53
61	Cradley Town (9)	1–3	Gedling Town (10)	57
62	Cadbury Athletic (10)	1–1	Alvechurch (9)	68
replay	Alvechurch (9)	6–0	Cadbury Athletic (10)	89
63	South Normanton Athletic (9)	1–0	Lye Town (10)	64
64	Barwell (9)	1–1	Newcastle Town (9)	66
replay	Newcastle Town (9)	1–2	Barwell (9)	136
65	Tipton Town (9)	1–1	Leek CSOB (10)	60
replay	Leek CSOB (10)	0–4	Tipton Town (9)	69
66	Coleshill Town (10)	1–1	Wellington (Herefords) (10)	91
replay	Wellington (Herefords) (10)	3–2	Coleshill Town (10)	113
67	Wroxham (9)	3–0	Hadleigh United (10)	121
68	Walsham-le-Willows (9)	3–0	Stowmarket Town (10)	216
69	Woodbridge Town (9)	5–0	Great Yarmouth Town (10)	105
70	St Ives Town (9)	3–2	Cornard United (10)	65
71	Bourne Town (9)	2–3	Haverhill Rovers (9)	82
72	Mildenhall Town (9)	3–0	Leiston (9)	155
73	Holbeach United (9)	2–1	Wisbech Town (9)	349
74	Dereham Town (9)	12–0	Fakenham Town (10)	193
75	Felixstowe & Walton United (9)	2–2	Debenham LC (10)	
replay	Debenham LC (10)	2–0	Felixstowe & Walton United (9)	189
76	Long Melford (10)	0–2	Blackstones (9)	104
77	Needham Market (9)	4–1	Lowestoft Town (9)	196
78	Soham Town Rangers (9)	5–2	St Neots Town (9)	100
79	Deeping Rangers (9)	5–0	Lincoln Moorlands Railway (9)	89
80	Yaxley (9)	1–0	March Town United (10)	156
81	Brimsdown Rovers (9)	1–2	Burnham Ramblers (9)	54
82	Sporting Bengal United (9)	0–0	London APSA (9)	
replay	London APSA (9)	4–3	Sporting Bengal United (9)	71
83	Saffron Walden Town (10)	2–2	Wootton Blue Cross (9)	167
replay	Wootton Blue Cross (9)	1–6	Saffron Walden Town (10)	67
84	Daventry United (10)	0–2	Raunds Town (9)	40
85	Northampton Spencer (9)	3–2	Clapton (9)	74

Tie	Home team (tier)	Score	Away team (tier)	Att.
86	FC Clacton (10)	1–1	Desborough Town (9)	140
replay	Desborough Town (9)	2–3	FC Clacton (10)	100
87	Biggleswade United (9)	1–1	Broxbourne Borough V&E (9)	
replay	Broxbourne Borough V&E (9)	2–1	Biggleswade United (9)	89
88	Welwyn Garden City (9)	3–1	Bowers & Pitsea (9)	43
89	Bedfont (9)	0–2	Oxhey Jets (9)	72
90	Tring Athletic (9)	2–1	Ruislip Manor (9)	102
91	Stansted (9)	2–0	Hullbridge Sports (9)	
92	Hertford Town (9)	1–0	Cogenhoe United (9)	107
93	Potton United (9)	3–2	Romford (9)	120
94	Long Buckby (9)	3–1	Hoddesdon Town (10)	
95	Barkingside (9)	5–3	Stewart & Lloyds Corby (9)	37
96	Halstead Town (10)	2–2	Wellingborough Town (9)	116
replay	Wellingborough Town (9)	2–0	Halstead Town (10)	148
97	Eton Manor (9)	3–1	Colney Heath (9)	54
98	London Colney (9)	0–1	Langford (9)	72
99	Bedfont Green (9)	2–2	Stanway Rovers (9)	35
replay	Stanway Rovers (9)	2–1	Bedfont Green (9)	55
100	Cockfosters (9)	3–2	Southend Manor (9)	88
101	Tiptree United (10)	2–2	Sawbridgeworth Town (9)	69
replay	Sawbridgeworth Town (9)	2–4	Tiptree United (10)	81
102	Barking (9)	4–0	Harefield United (9)	94
103	Leverstock Green (9)	0–3	Stotfold (9)	54
104	Haringey Borough (10)	2–2	Wembley (9)	62
replay	Wembley (9)	3–0	Haringey Borough (10)	57
105	Biggleswade Town (9)	1–3	Concord Rangers (9)	70
106	North Greenford United (9)	5–0	Royston Town (10)	56
107	Tunbridge Wells (9)	3–4	Chessington & Hook United (9)	103
108	Three Bridges (9)	1–0	Wealden (10)	77
109	Camberley Town (9)	2–0	Worthing United (9)	82
110	Frimley Green (10)	1–2	Colliers Wood United (9)	38
111	Dorking (9)	0–1	Selsey (9)	59
112	Whitehawk (9)	0–1	VCD Athletic (9)	73
113	Redhill (9)	3–1	Sidley United (9)	100
114	Farnham Town (10)	1–4	Ringmer (9)	45
115	Raynes Park Vale (9)	3–3	Deal Town (9)	80
replay	Deal Town (9)	4–2	Raynes Park Vale (9)	98
116	Westfield (Surrey) (10)	0–2	Banstead Athletic (9)	48
117	Eastbourne United (9)	1–3	Sevenoaks Town (9)	65
118	Erith Town (9)	3–1	Cobham (9)	30
119	Lancing (10)	1–1	Faversham Town (9)	73
replay	Faversham Town (9)	3–0	Lancing (10)	104
120	Lordswood (9)	1–1	Bookham (9)	119
replay	Bookham (9)	1–2	Lordswood (9)	121
121	Herne Bay (9)	0–0	East Grinstead Town (10)	124
replay	East Grinstead Town (10)	0–3	Herne Bay (9)	118
122	Epsom & Ewell (9)	1–7	Crowborough Athletic (9)	72
123	Merstham (9)	2–3	Hythe Town (9)	93
124	Saltdean United (11)	w/o	Croydon (9)	
Walkover for Croydon – Saltdean United removed
125	Peacehaven & Telscombe (10)	1–2	East Preston (9)	51
126	Pagham (9)	1–1	Hailsham Town (9)	83
replay	Hailsham Town (9)	2–0	Pagham (9)	76
127	Wick (9)	2–2	Chertsey Town (9)	66
replay	Chertsey Town (9)	3–0	Wick (9)	138
128	Thamesmead Town (9)	4–1	Egham Town (9)	62
129	Shoreham (9)	0–1	Horley Town (9)	110
130	Hassocks (9)	1–0	Rye United (9)	102
131	Mile Oak (10)	0–2	Guildford City (9)	55
132	VT (9)	5–0	Cowes Sports (9)	64
133	Corsham Town (9)	5–1	Wantage Town (9)	110
134	Fareham Town (9)	1–1	Carterton (9)	100
replay	Carterton (9)	0–3	Fareham Town (9)	54
135	Highworth Town (9)	0–0	Wootton Bassett Town (10)	177
replay	Wootton Bassett Town (10)	2–1	Highworth Town (9)	156
136	Bournemouth (9)	2–3	Beaconsfield SYCOB (9)	60
137	Henley Town (10)	3–2	Westbury United (10)	38
138	Christchurch (9)	6–1	Aylesbury Vale (9)	58
139	Sandhurst Town (9)	2–0	Newport Pagnell Town (9)	55
140	Kidlington (9)	1–1	Shrivenham (9)	78
replay	Shrivenham (9)	1–2	Kidlington (9)	162
141	Buckingham Town (10)	1–3	Chalfont St Peter (9)	94
142	Hamble ASSC (9)	1–0	Alton Town (9)	94
143	Bemerton Heath Harlequins (9)	5–3	Reading Town (9)	41
144	Brockenhurst (9)	2–0	Witney United (9)	55
145	Abingdon Town (9)	2–1	Ardley United (9)	50
146	Flackwell Heath (9)	1–2	Moneyfields (9)	42
147	Thame United (10)	1–2	Downton (9)	43
148	Holmer Green (9)	0–1	Melksham Town (9)	45
149	North Leigh (9)	4–0	Devizes Town (9)	55
150	New Milton Town (9)	1–5	AFC Totton (9)	90
151	Bicester Town (9)	1–1	Milton United (9)	47
replay	Milton United (9)	0–1	Bicester Town (9)	135
152	Hungerford Town (9)	0–0	Calne Town (9)	92
replay	Calne Town (9)	0–3	Hungerford Town (9)	92
153	Lymington Town (9)	4–1	AFC Wallingford (9)	60
154	Marlow United (10)	1–2	Cove (9)	182
155	Minehead (10)	4–0	Harrow Hill (9)	43
156	Saltash United (10)	2–1	Almondsbury Town (9)	104
157	Shortwood United (9)	1–0	Bishop Sutton (9)	65
158	Shepton Mallet (10)	2–2	Radstock Town (9)	61
replay	Radstock Town (9)	0–2	Shepton Mallet (10)	56
159	Bitton (9)	2–0	Bideford (9)	108
160	Street (9)	2–5	Wimborne Town (9)	110
161	Barnstaple Town (9)	4–1	Clevedon United (10)	112
162	Liskeard Athletic (10)	2–2	Shaftesbury (10)	74
replay	Shaftesbury (10)	0–3	Liskeard Athletic (10)	119
163	Tavistock (10)	1–3	Bodmin Town (10)	120
164	Keynsham Town (10)	1–2	St Blazey (10)	45
165	Poole Town (9)	0–2	Dawlish Town (9)	130
166	Torrington	w/o	Hamworthy United (9)	
Walkover for Hamworthy United – Torrington removed
167	Hallen (9)	4–2	Fairford Town (9)	46
168	Bridport (10)	0–5	Welton Rovers (9)	86
169	Chard Town (9)	1–3	Sherborne Town (9)	110
170	Odd Down (9)	2–0	Bristol Manor Farm (9)	51
171	Falmouth Town (10)	1–2	Frome Town (9)	147

== Preliminary round ==
Matches played on the weekend of Saturday 1 September 2007. A total of 332 clubs took part in this stage of the competition, including the 171 winners from the extra preliminary round, 38 clubs from Levels 9-10, who get a bye in the extra preliminary round and 123 entering at this stage from the six leagues at Level 8 of English football. The round featured 48 clubs from Level 10 still in the competition, being the lowest ranked clubs in this round.

Tie	Home team (tier)	Score	Away team (tier)	Att.
1	Jarrow Roofing Boldon CA (9)	1–0	Norton & Stockton Ancients (10)	50
2	Chester-Le-Street Town (9)	2–1	Billingham Synthonia (9)	103
3	Winterton Rangers (9)	1–0	Morpeth Town (9)	55
4	Selby Town (9)	4–0	Pickering Town (9)	134
5	Marske United (10)	1–1	Horden Colliery Welfare (10)	93
replay	Horden Colliery Welfare (10)	2–1	Marske United (10)	85
6	Wakefield (8)	1–1	West Auckland Town (9)	75
replay	West Auckland Town (9)	1–0	Wakefield (8)	89
7	Ashington (9)	1–3	Newcastle Blue Star (8)	139
8	Liversedge (9)	2–0	Dunston Federation (9)	159
9	Bridlington Town (8)	1–2	Newcastle Benfield (9)	173
10	Durham City (9)	2–2	Silsden (9)	98
replay	Silsden (9)	0–3	Durham City (9)	112
11	Spennymoor Town (9)	3–2	Garforth Town (8)	227
12	Shildon (9)	5–4	Goole (8)	170
13	Brigg Town (8)	4–0	South Shields (10)	116
14	Tow Law Town (9)	0–0	Billingham Town (9)	108
replay	Billingham Town (9)	3–2	Tow Law Town (9)	212
15	Hall Road Rangers (10)	1–0	Crook Town (10)	97
16	Esh Winning (10)	1–4	Harrogate Railway Athletic (8)	70
17	Consett (9)	4–0	Darlington Railway Athletic (10)	120
18	Ossett Albion (8)	0–1	Bradford Park Avenue (8)	278
19	Cheadle Town (10)	3–0	Ashton Town (10)	74
20	Chorley (8)	2–0	Warrington Town (8)	322
21	Atherton Collieries (9)	3–1	Bacup Borough (9)	52
22	Parkgate (9)	2–1	Alsager Town (8)	52
23	Clitheroe (8)	3–2	St Helens Town (9)	210
24	Colwyn Bay (8)	2–2	Congleton Town (9)	398
replay	Congleton Town (9)	1–5	Colwyn Bay (8)	208
25	Maine Road (9)	0–3	Skelmersdale United (8)	89
26	Winsford United (9)	1–3	Penrith Town (10)	108
27	Radcliffe Borough (8)	3–0	Lancaster City (8)	156
28	Colne (9)	1–3	Nantwich Town (8)	127
29	Trafford (9)	2–5	FC United of Manchester (8)	2,238
30	Woodley Sports (8)	1–1	Mossley (8)	129
replay	Mossley (8)	1–2	Woodley Sports (8)	210
31	Rossendale United (8)	0–2	Dinnington Town (10)	89
32	Hallam (9)	2–2	AFC Emley (10)	226
replay	AFC Emley (10)	1–2	Hallam (9)	202
33	Flixton (9)	1–0	Salford City (9)	133
34	Cammell Laird (8)	2–0	Sheffield (8)	130
35	Bamber Bridge (8)	2–0	Oldham Town (10)	115
36	Stocksbridge Park Steels (8)	3–2	Curzon Ashton (8)	96
37	Leamington (8)	1–0	Shifnal Town (9)	581
38	Bromyard Town (10)	1–4	Shepshed Dynamo (8)	78
39	Retford United (8)	1–2	Tipton Town (9)	223
40	Rushall Olympic (8)	3–0	Boldmere St Michaels (9)	101
41	Pelsall Villa (10)	1–6	Quorn (8)	84
42	Causeway United (9)	1–1	Westfields (9)	111
replay	Westfields (9)	2–3	Causeway United (9)	
43	Glapwell (9)	1–0	Stone Dominoes (10)	60
44	Mickleover Sports (9)	0–0	Long Eaton United (9)	147
replay	Long Eaton United (9)	3–4	Mickleover Sports (9)	105
45	Bolehall Swifts (10)	1–3	Alvechurch (9)	86
46	Brierley Hill & Withymoor (10)	1–0	Staveley Miners Welfare (10)	94
47	Sutton Coldfield Town (8)	1–1	Romulus (8)	233
replay	Romulus (8)	4–4 (6–7 p)	Sutton Coldfield Town (8)	312
48	Evesham United (8)	1–0	Gresley Rovers (8)	123
49	Loughborough Dynamo (9)	1–1	Market Drayton Town (9)	155
replay	Market Drayton Town (9)	4–0	Loughborough Dynamo (9)	115
50	New Mills (10)	1–3	Atherstone Town (9)	234
51	Rocester (9)	1–0	Wellington (Herefords) (10)	102
52	Southam United (10)	0–2	Stratford Town (9)	155
53	Stourbridge (8)	2–1	Highgate United (10)	144
54	Barwell (9)	0–4	Biddulph Victoria (9)	92
55	Chasetown (8)	4–1	Oadby Town (9)	321
56	South Normanton Athletic (9)	1–1	Bedworth United (8)	90
replay	Bedworth United (8)	1–0	South Normanton Athletic (9)	133
57	Teversal (10)	0–0	Rainworth Miners Welfare (10)	
replay	Rainworth Miners Welfare (10)	2–1	Teversal (10)	185
58	Barnt Green Spartak (10)	X	Willenhall Town (8)	112
3-2 result annulled following a protest over ineligible Barnt Green Spartak player.
replay	Willenhall Town (8)	3–1	Barnt Green Spartak (10)	108
59	Carlton Town (8)	2–1	Pilkington XXX (10)	107
60	Meir KA (10)	1–1	Gedling Town (10)	52
replay	Gedling Town (10)	5–0	Meir KA (10)	
61	Oldbury United (9)	1–3	Kidsgrove Athletic (8)	74
62	Belper Town (8)	3–3	Stourport Swifts (8)	137
replay	Stourport Swifts (8)	2–5	Belper Town (8)	96
63	Malvern Town (8)	3–0	Glossop North End (9)	63
64	Deeping Rangers (9)	0–0	Dereham Town (9)	152
replay	Dereham Town (9)	0–1	Deeping Rangers (9)	230
65	Diss Town (10)	0–1	Kirkley & Pakefield (9)	170
66	Ipswich Wanderers (9)	1–10	Needham Market (9)	176
67	Ely City (10)	0–1	Boston Town (9)	166
68	Yaxley (9)	0–3	Soham Town Rangers (9)	146
69	Spalding United (8)	5–1	Norwich United (9)	104
70	Blackstones (9)	0–0	Grantham Town (8)	240
replay	Grantham Town (8)	2–1	Blackstones (9)	232
71	Walsham-le-Willows (9)	0–0	Haverhill Rovers (9)	146
replay	Haverhill Rovers (9)	4–2	Walsham-le-Willows (9)	
72	Mildenhall Town (9)	2–1	St Ives Town (9)	176
73	Holbeach United (9)	2–0	Newmarket Town (9)	132
74	Debenham LC (10)	2–0	Gorleston (10)	125
75	Woodbridge Town (9)	0–2	Wroxham (9)	91
76	AFC Sudbury (8)	2–3	Bury Town (8)	406
77	Stanway Rovers (9)	0–3	Saffron Walden Town (10)	89
78	Wivenhoe Town (8)	0–4	Concord Rangers (9)	94
79	Tilbury (8)	0–4	Great Wakering Rovers (8)	79
80	Hillingdon Borough (8)	0–0	Barking (9)	95
replay	Barking (9)	1–1 (3–4 p)	Hillingdon Borough (8)	
81	Tring Athletic (9)	4–4	Hertford Town (9)	141
replay	Hertford Town (9)	2–0	Tring Athletic (9)	145
82	Enfield Town (8)	2–1	AFC Hayes (8)	209

Tie	Home team (tier)	Score	Away team (tier)	Att.
83	Rothwell Town (8)	2–1	Canvey Island (8)	232
84	Dunstable Town (8)	3–1	Wingate & Finchley (8)	112
85	Aveley (8)	2–1	Berkhamsted Town (8)	66
86	Harwich & Parkeston (9)	2–0	Ilford (8)	183
87	Northwood (8)	1–0	Uxbridge (8)	193
88	Bedford (10)	0–3	Broxbourne Borough V&E (9)	60
89	Arlesey Town (8)	0–1	Brentwood Town (8)	118
90	Langford (9)	0–0	Potters Bar Town (8)	80
replay	Potters Bar Town (8)	5–1	Langford (9)	64
91	Waltham Forest (8)	1–1	Wellingborough Town (9)	84
replay	Wellingborough Town (9)	0–2	Waltham Forest (8)	156
92	Wembley (9)	1–4	Ware (8)	74
93	Leighton Town (8)	3–1	FC Clacton (10)	125
94	Maldon Town (8)	5–0	Eton Manor (9)	72
95	Barkingside (9)	2–1	Hanwell Town (9)	127
96	Stotfold (9)	7–2	Potton United (9)	103
97	Welwyn Garden City (9)	1–1	Cockfosters (9)	
replay	Cockfosters (9)	0–1	Welwyn Garden City (9)	83
98	Oxhey Jets (9)	1–4	Burnham Ramblers (9)	73
99	Tiptree United (10)	2–0	London APSA (9)	77
Tiptree United played ineligible player, London APSA wins via walkover
100	Raunds Town (9)	1–5	Edgware Town (8)	79
101	Long Buckby (9)	1–1	Barton Rovers (8)	
replay	Barton Rovers (8)	5–0	Long Buckby (9)	100
102	Witham Town (8)	2–3	Waltham Abbey (8)	108
103	Stansted (9)	4–1	St Margaretsbury (9)	145
104	Northampton Spencer (9)	2–1	North Greenford United (9)	87
105	Redbridge (8)	1–2	Woodford United (8)	69
106	Corinthian Casuals (8)	1–2	Deal Town (9)	83
107	Arundel (9)	1–1	Molesey (8)	92
replay	Molesey (8)	1–2	Arundel (9)	121
108	Walton & Hersham (8)	3–0	Hassocks (9)	101
109	Burgess Hill Town (8)	7–0	Banstead Athletic (9)	149
110	Dartford (8)	3–0	Leatherhead (8)	879
111	Slade Green (9)	1–6	Croydon (9)	68
112	Ringmer (9)	1–4	Chatham Town (8)	102
113	Selsey (9)	1–0	Lordswood (9)	120
114	Sittingbourne (8)	1–0	Chertsey Town (9)	194
115	Camberley Town (9)	0–0	Ash United (9)	118
replay	Ash United (9)	0–3	Camberley Town (9)	154
116	Metropolitan Police (8)	0–1	Croydon Athletic (8)	94
117	Eastbourne Town (8)	2–1	Kingstonian (8)	368
118	Colliers Wood United (9)	7–6	Faversham Town (9)	55
119	Redhill (9)	0–1	Dover Athletic (8)	302
120	Herne Bay (9)	2–0	Guildford City (9)	198
121	Erith & Belvedere (9)	2–0	Ashford Town (Kent) (8)	216
122	Dulwich Hamlet (8)	2–0	Three Bridges (9)	206
123	Horley Town (9)	0–0	East Preston (9)	111
replay	East Preston (9)	1–1 (5–6 p)	Horley Town (9)	71
124	Walton Casuals (8)	1–3	Sevenoaks Town (9)	68
125	Thamesmead Town (9)	3–1	Whitstable Town (8)	75
126	Erith Town (9)	1–0	VCD Athletic (9)	67
127	Littlehampton Town (10)	3–2	Chipstead (8)	67
128	Tooting & Mitcham United (8)	1–2	Cray Wanderers (8)	240
129	Crowborough Athletic (9)	1–1	Hailsham Town (9)	160
replay	Hailsham Town (9)	1–1 (5–6 p)	Crowborough Athletic (9)	192
130	Hythe Town (9)	2–1	Whyteleafe (8)	139
131	Godalming Town (8)	2–2	Worthing (8)	225
replay	Worthing (8)	3–0	Godalming Town (8)	292
132	Horsham YMCA (8)	4–1	Chessington & Hook United (9)	74
133	Wootton Bassett Town (10)	2–1	Bracknell Town (8)	171
134	Slough Town (8)	1–4	Fleet Town (8)	203
135	Windsor & Eton (8)	1–1	Marlow (8)	162
replay	Marlow (8)	0–3	Windsor & Eton (8)	191
136	Melksham Town (9)	4–0	Bicester Town (9)	51
137	Burnham (8)	1–1	Brockenhurst (9)	76
replay	Brockenhurst (9)	3–0	Burnham (8)	107
138	Christchurch (9)	2–4	Didcot Town (8)	126
139	Chalfont St Peter (9)	1–0	Hamble ASSC (9)	53
140	Winchester City (8)	0–2	Moneyfields (9)	181
141	Fareham Town (9)	3–3	Sandhurst Town (9)	116
replay	Sandhurst Town (9)	0–0 (4–3 p)	Fareham Town (9)	91
142	Beaconsfield SYCOB (9)	0–0	Hungerford Town (9)	102
replay	Hungerford Town (9)	0–3	Beaconsfield SYCOB (9)	72
143	Farnborough (8)	0–2	Chesham United (8)	423
144	Aylesbury United (8)	4–2	Newport (IW) (8)	206
145	Henley Town (10)	3–2	Bemerton Heath Harlequins (9)	68
146	Abingdon Town (9)	2–3	AFC Totton (9)	70
147	Downton (9)	1–1	Abingdon United (8)	61
replay	Abingdon United (8)	5–2	Downton (9)	124
148	Cove (9)	1–6	Gosport Borough (8)	
149	Andover (8)	3–4	Oxford City (8)	166
150	North Leigh (9)	1–1	VT (9)	48
replay	VT (9)	2–1	North Leigh (9)	110
151	Corsham Town (9)	2–1	Lymington Town (9)	129
152	Kidlington (9)	2–3	Thatcham Town (8)	95
153	Slimbridge	w/o	Bitton (9)	
Walkover for Bitton – Slimbridge withdrawn
154	Brislington (9)	0–5	Wimborne Town (9)	64
155	Dawlish Town (9)	1–2	Bishop's Cleeve (8)	82
156	Shepton Mallet (10)	0–2	Hallen (9)	79
157	Shortwood United (9)	2–1	Frome Town (9)	86
158	Cinderford Town (8)	3–2	Elmore (10)	81
159	Paulton Rovers (8)	1–1	St Blazey (10)	136
replay	St Blazey (10)	0–3	Paulton Rovers (8)	
160	Bridgwater Town (8)	3–1	Minehead (10)	299
161	Barnstaple Town (9)	0–6	Truro City (9)	383
162	Sherborne Town (9)	3–2	Liskeard Athletic (10)	105
163	Willand Rovers (9)	2–3	Hamworthy United (9)	90
164	Bodmin Town (10)	4–0	Ilfracombe Town (9)	97
165	Saltash United (10)	2–3	Taunton Town (8)	145
166	Welton Rovers (9)	1–0	Odd Down (9)	64

== First qualifying round ==
Matches played on the weekend of Saturday 15 September 2007. A total of 232 clubs took part in this stage of the competition, including the 166 winners from the preliminary round and 66 entering at this stage from the top division of the three leagues at Level 7 of English football. The round featured 14 clubs from Level 10 still in the competition, being the lowest ranked clubs in this round.

Tie	Home team (tier)	Score	Away team (tier)	Att.
1	Bradford Park Avenue (8)	w/o	Scarborough	
Walkover for Bradford Park Avenue – Scarborough folded
2	West Auckland Town (9)	3–2	Winterton Rangers (9)	64
3	Newcastle Benfield (9)	2–1	Newcastle Blue Star (8)	142
4	Whitby Town (7)	3–2	Shildon (9)	346
5	Chester-Le-Street Town (9)	1–1	Harrogate Railway Athletic (8)	100
replay	Harrogate Railway Athletic (8)	3–0	Chester-Le-Street Town (9)	104
6	Consett (9)	3–0	Ossett Town (7)	186
7	Hall Road Rangers (10)	2–3	Billingham Town (9)	97
8	Gateshead (7)	6–1	Selby Town (9)	384
9	Liversedge (9)	1–0	North Ferriby United (7)	210
10	Spennymoor Town (9)	2–1	Brigg Town (8)	217
11	Horden Colliery Welfare (10)	1–1	Jarrow Roofing Boldon CA (9)	46
replay	Jarrow Roofing Boldon CA (9)	1–2	Horden Colliery Welfare (10)	78
12	Durham City (9)	1–3	Guiseley (7)	124
13	Dinnington Town (10)	2–2	Penrith Town (10)	268
replay	Penrith Town (10)	1–2	Dinnington Town (10)	115
14	Flixton (9)	2–2	Bamber Bridge (8)	103
replay	Bamber Bridge (8)	3–1	Flixton (9)	154
15	Fleetwood Town (7)	2–1	FC United of Manchester (8)	3,112
16	Witton Albion (7)	1–2	Prescot Cables (7)	335
17	Hallam (9)	0–1	Woodley Sports (8)	80
18	Frickley Athletic (7)	1–2	Stocksbridge Park Steels (8)	230
19	Nantwich Town (8)	3–2	Ashton United (7)	403
20	Chorley (8)	2–2	Clitheroe (8)	345
replay	Clitheroe (8)	1–1 (4–3 p)	Chorley (8)	300
21	Colwyn Bay (8)	2–1	Parkgate (9)	321
22	Skelmersdale United (8)	2–0	Marine (7)	259
23	Radcliffe Borough (8)	4–1	Cammell Laird (8)	160
24	Atherton Collieries (9)	2–5	Cheadle Town (10)	67
25	Worksop Town (7)	0–1	Kendal Town (7)	248
26	Stourbridge (8)	2–0	Leamington (8)	386
27	Kidsgrove Athletic (8)	2–0	Willenhall Town (8)	127
28	Rushall Olympic (8)	4–1	Atherstone Town (9)	161
29	Rocester (9)	0–1	Chasetown (8)	207
30	Belper Town (8)	3–0	Causeway United (9)	147
31	Bromsgrove Rovers (7)	1–1	Shepshed Dynamo (8)	348
replay	Shepshed Dynamo (8)	0–2	Bromsgrove Rovers (7)	242
32	Glapwell (9)	3–2	Rugby Town (7)	153
33	Quorn (8)	5–0	Alvechurch (9)	149
34	Halesowen Town (7)	4–0	Malvern Town (8)	328
35	Biddulph Victoria (9)	1–3	Rainworth Miners Welfare (10)	107
36	Sutton Coldfield Town (8)	2–1	Ilkeston Town (7)	101
37	Carlton Town (8)	2–4	Matlock Town (7)	187
38	Hednesford Town (7)	0–0	Stratford Town (9)	380
replay	Stratford Town (9)	0–1	Hednesford Town (7)	196
39	Evesham United (8)	1–1	Tipton Town (9)	111
replay	Tipton Town (9)	0–2	Evesham United (8)	80
40	Brierley Hill & Withymoor (10)	1–2	Market Drayton Town (9)	108
41	Bedworth United (8)	2–1	Eastwood Town (7)	173
42	Gedling Town (10)	3–1	Mickleover Sports (9)	80
43	Leek Town (7)	1–2	Buxton (7)	653
44	Holbeach United (9)	0–2	Debenham LC (10)	236
45	Kirkley & Pakefield (9)	2–1	Wroxham (9)	241
46	Boston Town (9)	0–4	Soham Town Rangers (9)	122
47	Bury Town (8)	2–0	Deeping Rangers (9)	252
48	Lincoln United (7)	1–2	King's Lynn (7)	271
49	Grantham Town (8)	1–1	Needham Market (9)	271
replay	Needham Market (9)	0–1	Grantham Town (8)	227
50	Stamford (7)	5–0	Spalding United (8)	319
51	Mildenhall Town (9)	1–1	Haverhill Rovers (9)	213
replay	Haverhill Rovers (9)	0–0 (5–4 p)	Mildenhall Town (9)	222
52	Hemel Hempstead Town (7)	4–0	East Thurrock United (7)	246
53	Hillingdon Borough (8)	1–0	Northampton Spencer (9)	85
54	Dunstable Town (8)	1–0	Waltham Abbey (8)	131
55	Hertford Town (9)	3–3	Barkingside (9)	101
replay	Barkingside (9)	3–1	Hertford Town (9)	102
56	Edgware Town (8)	2–0	Potters Bar Town (8)	81
57	Chelmsford City (7)	5–0	Burnham Ramblers (9)	787
58	Barton Rovers (8)	0–0	Corby Town (7)	165
replay	Corby Town (7)	3–1	Barton Rovers (8)	166
59	Harwich & Parkeston (9)	0–0	Woodford United (8)	140
replay	Woodford United (8)	3–1	Harwich & Parkeston (9)	107
60	Enfield Town (8)	1–1	Rothwell Town (8)	172
replay	Rothwell Town (8)	1–1 (3–4 p)	Enfield Town (8)	168

Tie	Home team (tier)	Score	Away team (tier)	Att.
61	Broxbourne Borough V&E (9)	1–1	Bedford Town (7)	172
replay	Bedford Town (7)	2–0	Broxbourne Borough V&E (9)	261
62	Saffron Walden Town (10)	1–2	Maldon Town (8)	208
63	AFC Hornchurch (7)	3–1	Cheshunt (7)	368
64	Welwyn Garden City (9)	2–8	Billericay Town (7)	122
65	Hendon (7)	1–1	Aveley (8)	128
replay	Aveley (8)	2–3	Hendon (7)	95
66	Boreham Wood (7)	1–0	Northwood (8)	156
67	Ware (8)	0–0	Great Wakering Rovers (8)	125
replay	Great Wakering Rovers (8)	4–5	Ware (8)	121
68	Stotfold (9)	3–2	Stansted (9)	118
69	Wealdstone (7)	1–0	Waltham Forest (8)	153
70	Harrow Borough (7)	2–3	Hitchin Town (7)	186
71	Harlow Town (7)	2–0	Concord Rangers (9)	212
72	Brackley Town (7)	0–0	Staines Town (7)	251
replay	Staines Town (7)	0–0 (5–4 p)	Brackley Town (7)	
73	Heybridge Swifts (7)	4–3	Leyton (7)	153
74	Ashford Town (Middx) (7)	0–1	Leighton Town (8)	77
75	London APSA (9)	0–4	Brentwood Town (8)	
76	Dulwich Hamlet (8)	2–2	Deal Town (9)	209
replay	Deal Town (9)	1–3	Dulwich Hamlet (8)	186
77	Hythe Town (9)	3–1	Littlehampton Town (10)	130
78	Burgess Hill Town (8)	0–2	Dover Athletic (8)	324
79	Herne Bay (9)	1–0	Sevenoaks Town (9)	240
80	Worthing (8)	0–0	Croydon (9)	365
replay	Croydon (9)	0–1	Worthing (8)	130
81	Horsham (7)	7–1	Arundel (9)	326
82	Chatham Town (8)	0–3	Margate (7)	287
83	Dartford (8)	1–1	Sittingbourne (8)	870
replay	Sittingbourne (8)	1–5	Dartford (8)	303
84	Folkestone Invicta (7)	1–1	Horsham YMCA (8)	289
replay	Horsham YMCA (8)	0–2	Folkestone Invicta (7)	105
85	Horley Town (9)	0–1	Erith Town (9)	106
86	Croydon Athletic (8)	1–1	Tonbridge Angels (7)	177
replay	Tonbridge Angels (7)	4–2	Croydon Athletic (8)	259
87	Cray Wanderers (8)	2–6	AFC Wimbledon (7)	933
88	Maidstone United (7)	3–0	Erith & Belvedere (9)	351
89	Eastbourne Town (8)	1–1	Walton & Hersham (8)	187
replay	Walton & Hersham (8)	2–1	Eastbourne Town (8)	101
90	Camberley Town (9)	4–2	Colliers Wood United (9)	84
91	Thamesmead Town (9)	2–4	Carshalton Athletic (7)	80
92	Crowborough Athletic (9)	2–1	Selsey (9)	96
93	Hastings United (7)	0–1	Ramsgate (7)	481
94	VT (9)	1–1	Bashley (7)	207
replay	Bashley (7)	4–3	VT (9)	166
95	Didcot Town (8)	0–1	Windsor & Eton (8)	270
96	Sandhurst Town (9)	1–6	Chalfont St Peter (9)	65
97	Banbury United (7)	1–4	Aylesbury United (8)	419
98	Fleet Town (8)	0–0	Gosport Borough (8)	186
replay	Gosport Borough (8)	1–3	Fleet Town (8)	152
99	Oxford City (8)	4–2	Swindon Supermarine (7)	158
100	Abingdon United (8)	1–1	A.F.C. Totton (9)	95
replay	AFC Totton (9)	4–1	Abingdon United (8)	129
101	Corsham Town (9)	1–0	Melksham Town (9)	252
102	Moneyfields (9)	1–0	Thatcham Town (8)	116
103	Chesham United (8)	5–1	Henley Town (10)	273
104	Brockenhurst (9)	1–1	Wootton Bassett Town (10)	124
replay	Wootton Bassett Town (10)	1–5	Brockenhurst (9)	162
105	Beaconsfield SYCOB (9)	1–1	Chippenham Town (7)	144
replay	Chippenham Town (7)	2–0	Beaconsfield SYCOB (9)	272
106	Mangotsfield United (7)	3–0	Taunton Town (8)	211
107	Yate Town (7)	1–5	Gloucester City (7)	309
108	Tiverton Town (7)	0–3	Shortwood United (9)	374
109	Hamworthy United (9)	3–3	Bishop's Cleeve (8)	98
replay	Bishop's Cleeve (8)	0–1	Hamworthy United (9)	80
110	Bridgwater Town (8)	0–2	Paulton Rovers (8)	339
111	Hallen (9)	1–0	Sherborne Town (9)	38
112	Cirencester Town (7)	1–1	Cinderford Town (8)	170
replay	Cinderford Town (8)	1–2	Cirencester Town (7)	120
113	Team Bath (7)	2–0	Bodmin Town (10)	92
114	Welton Rovers (9)	0–2	Truro City (9)	156
115	Clevedon Town (7)	4–0	Wimborne Town (9)	173
116	Bitton (9)	2–4	Merthyr Tydfil (7)	159

== Second qualifying round ==
Matches played on the weekend of Saturday 29 September 2007. A total of 160 clubs took part in this stage of the competition, including the 116 winners from the first qualifying round and 44 Level 6 clubs, from Conference North and Conference South, entering at this stage. Six clubs from Level 10 of English football were the lowest-ranked clubs to qualify for this round of the competition.

Tie	Home team (tier)	Score	Away team (tier)	Att.
1	Liversedge (9)	0–3	Kendal Town (7)	198
2	Consett (9)	0–2	Workington (6)	408
3	Barrow (6)	5–0	Colwyn Bay (8)	772
4	Billingham Town (9)	0–4	Fleetwood Town (7)	212
5	Skelmersdale United (8)	0–1	Southport (6)	769
6	Prescot Cables (7)	1–1	Guiseley (7)	265
replay	Guiseley (7)	1–0	Prescot Cables (7)	246
7	Dinnington Town (10)	2–1	Cheadle Town (10)	370
8	Harrogate Railway Athletic (8)	4–1	Leigh RMI (6)	126
9	Bradford Park Avenue (8)	4–0	Whitby Town (7)	278
10	Stalybridge Celtic (6)	1–0	Hyde United (6)	790
11	Bamber Bridge (8)	2–1	Burscough (6)	242
12	Gainsborough Trinity (6)	6–1	Stocksbridge Park Steels (8)	394
13	Harrogate Town (6)	2–2	Nantwich Town (8)	480
replay	Nantwich Town (8)	1–2	Harrogate Town (6)	463
14	West Auckland Town (9)	1–0	Newcastle Benfield (9)	76
15	Gateshead (7)	1–3	Vauxhall Motors (6)	246
16	Clitheroe (8)	8–2	Spennymoor Town (9)	330
17	Blyth Spartans (6)	2–1	Radcliffe Borough (8)	480
18	Horden Colliery Welfare (10)	0–5	Woodley Sports (8)	58
19	Cambridge City (6)	1–1	Chasetown (8)	359
replay	Chasetown (8)	2–1	Cambridge City (6)	444
20	Kettering Town (6)	3–1	Redditch United (6)	1,072
21	Bromsgrove Rovers (7)	1–1	Nuneaton Borough (6)	581
replay	Nuneaton Borough (6)	2–0	Bromsgrove Rovers (7)	607
22	Rainworth Miners Welfare (10)	2–0	Kidsgrove Athletic (8)	189
23	Matlock Town (7)	3–1	AFC Telford United (6)	591
24	Stourbridge (8)	0–5	King's Lynn (7)	315
25	Soham Town Rangers (9)	0–3	Solihull Moors (6)	200
26	Hinckley United (6)	4–2	Grantham Town (8)	366
27	Boston United (6)	4–1	Buxton (7)	1,347
28	Quorn (8)	1–3	Evesham United (8)	109
29	Tamworth (6)	1–0	Worcester City (6)	801
30	Hednesford Town (7)	0–0	Alfreton Town (6)	448
replay	Alfreton Town (6)	1–2	Hednesford Town (7)	246
31	Rushall Olympic (8)	2–0	Sutton Coldfield Town (8)	266
32	Glapwell (9)	4–4	Market Drayton Town (9)	120
replay	Market Drayton Town (9)	1–2	Glapwell (9)	159
33	Belper Town (8)	2–1	Hucknall Town (6)	295
34	Halesowen Town (7)	2–1	Bedworth United (8)	368
35	Stamford (7)	3–1	Gedling Town (10)	283
36	Horsham (7)	3–2	Bury Town (8)	404
37	Hayes & Yeading United (6)	2–2	Herne Bay (9)	211
replay	Herne Bay (9)	0–3	Hayes & Yeading United (6)	364
38	Dulwich Hamlet (8)	2–1	Chalfont St Peter (9)	215
39	Crowborough Athletic (9)	1–5	Staines Town (7)	287
40	Boreham Wood (7)	3–3	Bedford Town (7)	246
replay	Bedford Town (7)	2–3	Boreham Wood (7)	310
41	Ware (8)	3–2	Thurrock (6)	172

Tie	Home team (tier)	Score	Away team (tier)	Att.иш
42	Haverhill Rovers (9)	1–1	Hitchin Town (7)	313
replay	Hitchin Town (7)	5–0	Haverhill Rovers (9)	160
43	Dartford (8)	2–2	Camberley Town (9)	906
replay	Camberley Town (9)	0–0 (1–4 p)	Dartford (8)	242
44	Fisher Athletic (6)	3–4	Margate (7)	218
45	Hemel Hempstead Town (7)	0–2	Chelmsford City (7)	521
46	Welling United (6)	2–1	Barkingside (9)	436
47	Billericay Town (7)	2–0	Maidstone United (7)	594
48	Tonbridge Angels (7)	2–2	Maldon Town (8)	363
replay	Maldon Town (8)	0–2	Tonbridge Angels (7)	151
49	Dunstable Town (8)	0–2	Lewes (6)	212
50	St Albans City (6)	1–2	Bishop's Stortford (6)	
51	Kirkley & Pakefield (9)	1–2	Leighton Town (8)	225
52	Brentwood Town (8)	2–0	Harlow Town (7)	192
53	Chesham United (8)	1–1	Stotfold (9)	239
replay	Stotfold (9)	2–1	Chesham United (8)	165
54	Worthing (8)	3–0	Walton & Hersham (8)	375
55	Hampton & Richmond (6)	3–1	Braintree Town (6)	276
56	Hendon (7)	1–1	AFC Hornchurch (7)	225
replay	AFC Hornchurch (7)	2–1	Hendon (7)	333
57	Sutton United (6)	1–1	Woodford United (8)	293
replay	Woodford United (8)	0–2	Sutton United (6)	137
58	Debenham LC (10)	1–5	AFC Wimbledon (7)	1,026
59	Ramsgate (7)	0–1	Corby Town (7)	330
60	Folkestone Invicta (7)	0–0	Windsor & Eton (8)	264
replay	Windsor & Eton (8)	0–1	Folkestone Invicta (7)	144
61	Hythe Town (9)	2–1	Dover Athletic (8)	1,109
62	Enfield Town (8)	2–2	Hillingdon Borough (8)	244
replay	Hillingdon Borough (8)	2–1	Enfield Town (8)	140
63	Erith Town (9)	0–3	Heybridge Swifts (7)	250
64	Aylesbury United (8)	1–1	Bromley (6)	406
replay	Bromley (6)	4–2	Aylesbury United (8)	346
65	Carshalton Athletic (7)	0–1	Wealdstone (7)	316
66	Eastbourne Borough (6)	2–0	Edgware Town (8)	573
67	Merthyr Tydfil (7)	2–2	AFC Totton (9)	289
replay	AFC Totton (9)	0–0 (3–4 p)	Merthyr Tydfil (7)	273
68	Brockenhurst (9)	0–6	Maidenhead United (6)	237
69	Oxford City (8)	3–4	Weston-super-Mare (6)	278
70	Bognor Regis Town (6)	1–2	Havant & Waterlooville (6)	426
71	Chippenham Town (7)	2–0	Hallen (9)	499
72	Dorchester Town (6)	1–1	Paulton Rovers (8)	374
replay	Paulton Rovers (8)	2–0	Dorchester Town (6)	232
73	Gloucester City (7)	0–2	Shortwood United (9)	706
74	Basingstoke Town (6)	0–1	Newport County (6)	
75	Truro City (9)	0–1	Bath City (6)	1,127
76	Corsham Town (9)	1–2	Bashley (7)	174
77	Moneyfields (9)	1–8	Team Bath (7)	228
78	Hamworthy United (9)	1–3	Eastleigh (6)	278
79	Cirencester Town (7)	0–1	Clevedon Town (7)	145
80	Fleet Town (8)	2–0	Mangotsfield United (7)	175

== Third qualifying round ==
Matches played on the weekend of Saturday 13 October 2007. A total of 80 clubs took part, all having progressed from the second qualifying round. Dinnington Town and Rainworth Miners Welfare from Level 10 of English football were the lowest-ranked clubs to qualify for this round of the competition.

Tie	Home team (tier)	Score	Away team (tier)	Att.
1	Harrogate Railway Athletic (8)	3–2	Matlock Town (7)	254
2	Harrogate Town (6)	2–0	Clitheroe (8)	516
3	Barrow (6)	2–1	Fleetwood Town (7)	855
4	West Auckland Town (9)	2–2	Bamber Bridge (8)	147
replay	Bamber Bridge (8)	5–1	West Auckland Town (9)	220
5	Dinnington Town (10)	1–7	Bradford Park Avenue (8)	518
6	Belper Town (8)	0–3	Southport (6)	382
7	Gainsborough Trinity (6)	1–0	Blyth Spartans (6)	379
8	Stalybridge Celtic (6)	0–5	Workington (6)	495
9	Kendal Town (7)	4–0	Woodley Sports (8)	195
10	Guiseley (7)	2–3	Vauxhall Motors (6)	292
11	Rushall Olympic (8)	2–0	Hednesford Town (7)	362
12	Chasetown (8)	2–0	Rainworth Miners Welfare (10)	604
13	Tamworth (6)	2–1	King's Lynn (7)	621
14	Boston United (6)	4–1	Hinckley United (6)	1,425
15	Evesham United (8)	3–0	Halesowen Town (7)	332
16	Glapwell (9)	0–3	Corby Town (7)	163
17	Kettering Town (6)	1–2	Solihull Moors (6)	805
18	Nuneaton Borough (6)	4–1	Stamford (7)	839
19	Wealdstone (7)	1–0	Bishop's Stortford (6)	301
20	Brentwood Town (8)	0–3	Staines Town (7)	277
21	Heybridge Swifts (7)	2–2	Billericay Town (7)	522
replay	Billericay Town (7)	2–0	Heybridge Swifts (7)	530

Tie	Home team (tier)	Score	Away team (tier)	Att.
22	Leighton Town (8)	3–1	Boreham Wood (7)	273
23	AFC Hornchurch (7)	2–1	Dulwich Hamlet (8)	610
24	Hitchin Town (7)	4–3	Margate (7)	325
25	Eastbourne Borough (6)	2–1	Welling United (6)	632
26	Hayes & Yeading United (6)	1–0	Chelmsford City (7)	393
27	AFC Wimbledon (7)	0–0	Horsham (7)	1,564
replay	Horsham (7)	1–1 (5–4 p)	AFC Wimbledon (7)	1,265
28	Lewes (6)	1–0	Sutton United (6)	693
29	Folkestone Invicta (7)	1–0	Hillingdon Borough (8)	284
30	Worthing (8)	0–2	Hampton & Richmond (6)	369
31	Hythe Town (9)	1–3	Ware (8)	236
32	Bromley (6)	1–0	Dartford (8)	1,022
33	Stotfold (9)	0–5	Tonbridge Angels (7)	343
34	Team Bath (7)	1–0	Weston-super-Mare (6)	286
35	Eastleigh (6)	5–0	Clevedon Town (7)	341
36	Havant & Waterlooville (6)	2–1	Fleet Town (8)	386
37	Merthyr Tydfil (7)	2–0	Paulton Rovers (8)	379
38	Newport County (6)	1–2	Bath City (6)	1,446
39	Maidenhead United (6)	3–0	Shortwood United (9)	211
40	Chippenham Town (7)	5–1	Bashley (7)	416

== Fourth qualifying round ==
Matches played on the weekend of Saturday 27 October 2007. A total of 64 clubs took part, 40 having progressed from the third qualifying round and 24 clubs from Conference Premier, forming Level 5 of English football, entering at this stage. Eight clubs from Level 8 of English football were the lowest-ranked clubs to qualify for this round of the competition.

Tie	Home team (tier)	Score	Away team (tier)	Att.
1	Evesham United (8)	0–0	Halifax Town (5)	652
replay	Halifax Town (5)	2–1	Evesham United (8)	1,025
2	Corby Town (7)	1–2	Droylsden (5)	562
3	Kendal Town (7)	0–1	Altrincham (5)	641
4	Rushden & Diamonds (5)	5–0	Solihull Moors (6)	1,076
5	Burton Albion (5)	2–1	Tamworth (6)	2,915
6	Histon (5)	4–1	Bamber Bridge (8)	535
7	Stafford Rangers (5)	1–1	Cambridge United (5)	1,030
replay	Cambridge United (5)	5–1	Stafford Rangers (5)	1,965
8	Southport (6)	1–3	Northwich Victoria (5)	1,232
9	Farsley Celtic (5)	1–1	Barrow (6)	528
replay	Barrow (6)	2–1	Farsley Celtic (5)	1,380
10	Bradford Park Avenue (8)	0–4	Gainsborough Trinity (6)	557
11	Workington (6)	1–0	Boston United (6)	635
12	York City (5)	6–0	Rushall Olympic (8)	1,630
13	Kidderminster Harriers (5)	3–1	Vauxhall Motors (6)	1,374
14	Harrogate Railway Athletic (8)	2–1	Harrogate Town (6)	1,286
15	Chasetown (8)	2–1	Nuneaton Borough (6)	1,408
16	Weymouth (5)	1–1	Hitchin Town (7)	1,106
replay	Hitchin Town (7)	0–1	Weymouth (5)	504

Tie	Home team (tier)	Score	Away team (tier)	Att.
17	AFC Hornchurch (7)	0–1	Team Bath (7)	641
18	Maidenhead United (6)	1–0	Hayes & Yeading United (6)	643
19	Salisbury City (5)	0–0	Stevenage Borough (5)	1,364
replay	Stevenage Borough (5)	1–0	Salisbury City (5)	1,174
20	Merthyr Tydfil (7)	1–2	Oxford United (5)	1,071
21	Hampton & Richmond (6)	1–0	Wealdstone (7)	679
22	Bath City (6)	0–2	Torquay United (5)	2,149
23	Crawley Town (5)	1–1	Aldershot Town (5)	1,934
replay	Aldershot Town (5)	1–0	Crawley Town (5)	2,058
24	Chippenham Town (7)	2–3	Horsham (7)	912
25	Eastleigh (6)	3–3	Forest Green Rovers (5)	742
replay	Forest Green Rovers (5)	4–1	Eastleigh (6)	753
26	Eastbourne Borough (6)	2–1	Bromley (6)	1,212
27	Ware (8)	3–1	Tonbridge Angels (7)	816
28	Folkestone Invicta (7)	0–2	Billericay Town (7)	659
29	Grays Athletic (5)	1–1	Lewes (6)	688
replay	Lewes (6)	2–0	Grays Athletic (5)	746
30	Woking (5)	0–1	Staines Town (7)	1,431
31	Ebbsfleet United (5)	1–3	Exeter City (5)	1,219
32	Havant & Waterlooville (6)	3–0	Leighton Town (8)	378

== Competition proper ==
See 2007–08 FA Cup for details of the rounds from the first round proper onwards.
