= Chessington United F.C. =

Chessington United may refer to:

- Chessington & Hook United F.C., known as Chessington United between 1972 and 1986
- Mole Valley Predators F.C., known as Chessington United between 1998 and 2005
