= Dave Hollins (footballer) =

Welsh footballer

Personal information
- Full name: David Michael Hollins
- Date of birth: 4 February 1938 (age 88)
- Place of birth: Bangor, Wales
- Position: Goalkeeper

Youth career
- –: Merrow

Senior career*
Years	Team	Apps	(Gls)
1957–1960	Brighton & Hove Albion	66	(0)
1960–1966	Newcastle United	112	(0)
1966–1970	Mansfield Town	111	(0)
1969	→ Nottingham Forest (loan)	9	(0)
1970–1971	Aldershot	16	(0)
1971	Romford	?	(?)
Total		314	(0)

International career
1962–1966	Wales	11	(0)
- * Club domestic league appearances and goals

David Michael Hollins (born 4 February 1938) is a Welsh former footballer who played at both professional and international levels as a goalkeeper.

== Personal life ==
Hollins was born in Bangor, Wales. He is the older brother of former England international footballer John Hollins, and the uncle of TV presenter Chris Hollins. Following the end of his playing career he became a painter and decorator, and later lived in Guildford.

== Career ==
=== Professional career ===
Hollins began his career with local non-league side Merrow, and played in the English Football League for Brighton & Hove Albion, Newcastle United and Mansfield Town. He was loaned to Nottingham Forest, in an emergency exchange for Duncan McKenzie, when Forest keeper Alan Hill broke an arm. He went on to play for Aldershot, making a total of 314 league appearances. He also played non-league football for Romford.

=== International career ===
Hollins earned 11 caps for Wales between 1962 and 1966.
