= 2005–06 Isthmian League =

The 2005–06 season was the 91st in the history of the Isthmian League, which is an English football competition featuring semi-professional and amateur clubs from London, East and South East England.

It was the last season in which the Isthmian League consisted of three tiers. At the end of the season Division Two was disbanded, and most of the Division Two clubs were distributed between lower-level leagues, while Division One was divided into Division One North and Division One South.

== Premier Division ==
Isthmian League Premier Division
- Season: 2005–06
- Champions: Braintree Town
- Promoted: Braintree Town; Fisher Athletic
- Relegated: Maldon Town; Redbridge; Windsor & Eton
- Matches: 462
- Goals: 1,302 (2.82 per match)
- Top goalscorer: 26 goals – Richard Jolly (Heybridge Swifts) and Jermaine Beckford (Wealdstone)
- Highest attendance: 3,315 – AFC Wimbledon – Hampton & Richmond Borough, (18 February)
- Total attendance: 215,064
- Average attendance: 466 (+44.3% to previous season)

The Premier Division consisted of 22 clubs, including 14 clubs from the previous season and eight new clubs.

- Two clubs relegated from the Conference South:
  - Margate
  - Redbridge
- Three clubs promoted from Division One:
  - AFC Wimbledon
  - Bromley
  - Walton & Hersham
- Three clubs promoted from Southern Football League Division One East:
  - Fisher Athletic
  - East Thurrock United
  - Maldon Town

Braintree Town won the division and were promoted to the Conference South along with play-off winners Fisher Athletic, who earned a second consecutive promotion. Maldon Town, Windsor & Eton and Redbridge were relegated, while Hendon were initially relegated too as the worst 19th-placed club among the seventh level leagues, but were reprieved after Canvey Island resigned from the Conference.

=== League table ===
Pos	Team	Pld	W	D	L	GF	GA	GD	Pts	Promotion or relegation
1	Braintree Town	42	28	10	4	74	32	+42	94	Promoted to the Conference South
2	Heybridge Swifts	42	28	3	11	70	46	+24	87	Qualified for the play-offs
3	Fisher Athletic	42	26	7	9	84	46	+38	85	Qualified for the play-offs, then promoted to the Conference South
4	AFC Wimbledon	42	22	11	9	67	36	+31	77	Qualified for the play-offs
5	Hampton & Richmond	42	24	3	15	73	54	+19	75	Qualified for the play-offs
6	Staines Town	42	20	10	12	74	56	+18	70	
7	Billericay Town	42	19	12	11	69	45	+24	69	
8	Worthing	42	19	10	13	71	60	+11	67	
9	Walton & Hersham	42	19	7	16	55	50	+5	64	
10	Chelmsford City	42	18	10	14	57	62	−5	64	
11	Bromley	42	16	14	12	57	49	+8	62	
12	East Thurrock United	42	18	5	19	60	60	0	59	
13	Folkestone Invicta	42	16	10	16	47	51	−4	58	
14	Margate	42	11	17	14	49	55	−6	50	
15	Leyton	42	13	9	20	58	61	−3	48	
16	Harrow Borough	42	13	9	20	56	73	−17	48	
17	Slough Town	42	13	8	21	63	75	−12	47	
18	Wealdstone	42	13	5	24	68	82	−14	44	Transferred to the SFL Premier Division
19	Hendon	42	9	12	21	44	64	−20	39	Reprieved from relegation
20	Maldon Town	42	8	11	23	41	73	−32	35	Relegated to Division One North
21	Windsor & Eton	42	8	8	26	37	75	−38	32	Relegated to the SFL Division One South & West
22	Redbridge	42	3	5	34	28	97	−69	14	Relegated to Division One North

Rules for classification: 1) points; 2) goal difference; 3) number of goals scored.

==== Top scorers ====
Player	Club	Goals
Richard Jolly	Heybridge Swifts / Wealdstone	26
Jermaine Beckford	Wealdstone	26
Danny Hockton	Billericay Town / Margate	24
Ian Hodges	Slough Town	21
Steve Watts	Fisher Athletic	21
Alex Revell	Braintree Town	21
Stafford Browne	Worthing	17
Lawrence Yaku	Hampton & Richmond Borough	17
Nic McDonnell	Bromley	17

=== Play-offs ===
Semifinals
2	Heybridge Swifts	1(2)
5	Hampton & Richmond	1(4)
3	Fisher Athletic	2
4	AFC Wimbledon	1

Final
3	Fisher Athletic	3
5	Hampton & Richmond	0

=== Stadia and locations ===
Locations of the Premier Division clubs
Greater London Premier Division football clubs

Club	Stadium
AFC Wimbledon	Kingsmeadow (groundshare with Kingstonian)
Billericay Town	New Lodge
Braintree Town	Cressing Road
Bromley	Hayes Lane
Chelmsford City	Melbourne Stadium
East Thurrock United	Rookery Hill
Fisher Athletic	Champion Hill (groundshare with Dulwich Hamlet)
Folkestone Invicta	Cheriton Road
Hampton & Richmond Borough	Beveree Stadium
Harrow Borough	Earlsmead Stadium
Hendon	Claremont Road
Heybridge Swifts	Scraley Road
Leyton	Leyton Stadium
Maldon Town	Wallace Binder Ground
Margate	Hartsdown Park
Redbridge	Oakside
Slough Town	Stag Meadow (groundshare with Windsor & Eton)
Staines Town	Wheatsheaf Park
Walton & Hersham	The Sports Ground
Wealdstone	Chestnut Avenue (groundshare with Northwood)
Windsor & Eton	Stag Meadow
Worthing	Woodside Road

1. Chelmsford City spent start of the season groundsharing with Billericay Town before returning to Chelmsford at January.

== Division One ==
Isthmian League Division One
- Season: 2005–06
- Champions: Ramsgate
- Promoted: Horsham; Ramsgate; Tonbridge Angels
- Matches: 506
- Goals: 1,451 (2.87 per match)
- Top goalscorer: 28 goals – Phil Ruggles (Molesey)
- Highest attendance: 1,734 – Dover Athletic – Ramsgate, (26 December)
- Total attendance: 117,472
- Average attendance: 232 (-36.3% to previous season)

The 2005–06 season was the last of two seasons in which the Isthmian League consisted of a single Division One.

Division One consisted of 23 clubs, including 17 clubs from the previous season and six new clubs:

- Dover Athletic, relegated from the Premier Division
- Kingstonian, relegated from the Premier Division
- Lymington & New Milton, promoted as champions of the Wessex League
- Ramsgate, promoted as champions of the Kent League
- Tonbridge Angels, relegated from the Premier Division
- Walton Casuals, promoted as champions of the Combined Counties League

Ramsgate won the division and were promoted to the Premier Division along with runners-up Horsham, and play-off winners Tonbridge Angels who returned to the Premier Division at the first attempt. There was no relegation from the division this season, though Banstead Athletic resigned from the league at the end of the season.

At the end of the season Division One North and Division One South were created to replace Division One. Most of the clubs remaining in the division were transferred to the new Division One South.

=== League table ===
Pos	Team	Pld	W	D	L	GF	GA	GD	Pts	Promotion or relegation
1	Ramsgate	44	24	14	6	84	38	+46	86	Promoted to the Premier Division
2	Horsham	44	25	11	8	94	55	+39	86	Promoted to the Premier Division
3	Tonbridge Angels	44	24	8	12	71	48	+23	80	Qualified for the play-offs, then promoted to the Premier Division
4	Metropolitan Police	44	24	7	13	72	46	+26	79	Qualified for the play-offs, then transferred to Division One South
5	Dover Athletic	44	21	14	9	69	46	+23	77	Qualified for the play-offs, then transferred to Division One South
6	Tooting & Mitcham United	44	22	9	13	93	62	+31	75	Qualified for the play-offs, then transferred to Division One South
7	Kingstonian	44	20	14	10	82	56	+26	74	Transferred to Division One South
8	Croydon Athletic	44	20	13	11	56	41	+15	73	Transferred to Division One South
9	Bashley	44	20	10	14	63	61	+2	70	Transferred to SFL Division One South & West
10	Leatherhead	44	18	14	12	64	50	+14	68	Transferred to Division One South
11	Cray Wanderers	44	20	8	16	80	74	+6	68	Transferred to Division One South
12	Hastings United	44	19	10	15	65	58	+7	67	Transferred to Division One South
13	Dulwich Hamlet	44	19	8	17	55	43	+12	65	Transferred to Division One South
14	Fleet Town	44	13	19	12	50	56	−6	58	Transferred to Division One South
15	Walton Casuals	44	16	10	18	68	75	−7	58	Transferred to Division One South
16	Lymington & New Milton	44	12	11	21	61	80	−19	47	Transferred to SFL Division One South & West
17	Molesey	44	12	10	22	56	79	−23	46	Transferred to Division One South
18	Whyteleafe	44	10	14	20	50	66	−16	44	Transferred to Division One South
19	Burgess Hill Town	44	10	10	24	57	83	−26	40	Transferred to Division One South
20	Banstead Athletic	44	8	13	23	43	71	−28	37	Resigned to the Combined Counties League
21	Ashford Town (Kent)	44	8	11	25	41	81	−40	35	Transferred to Division One South
22	Newport (Isle of Wight)	44	6	11	27	38	97	−59	29	Transferred to SFL Division One South & West
23	Corinthian-Casuals	44	6	9	29	39	85	−46	27	Transferred to Division One South

Rules for classification: 1) points; 2) goal difference; 3) number of goals scored.

==== Top scorers ====
Player	Club	Goals
Phil Ruggles	Molesey	28
Richard Gillespie	Bashley	22
James Rose	Fleet Town / Kingstonian	22
Shaun Welford	Ramsgate	21
Kevin Cooper	Metropolitan Police / Fleet Town	21
Jamie Taylor	Horsham	21

=== Play-offs ===
Semifinals
4	Metropolitan Police	0
5	Dover Athletic	1
3	Tonbridge Angels	2
6	Tooting & Mitcham United	0

Final
3	Tonbridge Angels	3
5	Dover Athletic	2

=== Stadia and locations ===
Locations of Division One clubs
Greater London Division One clubs

Club	Stadium
Ashford Town (Kent)	The Homelands
Banstead Athletic	Merland Rise
Bashley	Bashley Road
Burgess Hill Town	Leylands Park
Corinthian-Casuals	King George's Field
Cray Wanderers	Hayes Lane (groundshare with Bromley)
Croydon Athletic	Keith Tuckey Stadium
Dover Athletic	Crabble Athletic Ground
Dulwich Hamlet	Champion Hill
Fleet Town	Calthorpe Park
Hastings United	The Pilot Field
Horsham	Queen Street
Kingstonian	Kingsmeadow (groundshare with AFC Wimbledon)
Leatherhead	Fetcham Grove
Lymington & New Milton	Fawcetts Fields
Metropolitan Police	Imber Court
Molesey	Walton Road Stadium
Newport (IOW)	St Georges Park
Ramsgate	Southwood Stadium
Tonbridge Angels	Longmead Stadium
Tooting & Mitcham United	Imperial Fields
Walton Casuals	Waterside Stadium
Whyteleafe	Church Road

== Division Two ==
Isthmian League Division Two
- Season: 2005–06
- Champions: Ware
- Promoted: Brook House; Flackwell Heath; Ware; Witham Town
- Matches: 240
- Goals: 735 (3.06 per match)
- Top goalscorer: 29 goals – John Frendo (Ware)
- Highest attendance: 416 – Ware – Hertford Town, (26 December)
- Total attendance: 16,276
- Average attendance: 68 (-5.6% to previous season)

The 2005–06 season was the last Isthmian League Division Two season. Division Two consisted of 16 clubs, including 13 clubs from the previous season and three new clubs:

- Croydon, relegated from Division One
- Dorking, relegated from Division One
- Egham Town, relegated from Southern Football League Western Division

The four top clubs were promoted: Ware, Witham Town and Flackwell Heath moved to Division One North, while Brook House were transferred to the Southern League. Following this season, clubs remaining in the division were distributed between local ninth tier leagues. Clapton, who were one of the league founder members, were transferred to the Essex Senior League losing their place in the Isthmian League after 101 years.

=== League table ===
Pos	Team	Pld	W	D	L	GF	GA	GD	Pts	Promotion or relegation
1	Ware	30	19	4	7	77	36	+41	61	Promoted to Division One North
2	Witham Town	30	17	7	6	61	30	+31	58	Promoted to Division One North
3	Brook House	30	17	7	6	63	33	+30	58	Promoted to SFL Division One South & West
4	Flackwell Heath	30	15	7	8	54	49	+5	52	Promoted to Division One North
5	Egham Town	30	15	5	10	39	36	+3	50	Transferred to the Combined Counties League
6	Chertsey Town	30	14	7	9	47	37	+10	49	Transferred to the Combined Counties League
7	Edgware Town	30	13	5	12	46	41	+5	44	Transferred to the Spartan South Midlands League
8	Chalfont St Peter	30	13	2	15	50	53	−3	41	Transferred to the Spartan South Midlands League
9	Dorking	30	11	8	11	48	51	−3	41	Transferred to the Combined Counties League
10	Croydon	30	11	7	12	43	43	0	40	Transferred to the Kent League
11	Wembley	30	11	6	13	44	43	+1	39	Transferred to the Combined Counties League
12	Kingsbury Town	30	9	10	11	32	37	−5	37	Transferred to the Spartan South Midlands League
13	Hertford Town	30	7	10	13	35	54	−19	31	Transferred to the Spartan South Midlands League
14	Camberley Town	30	5	8	17	31	57	−26	23	Transferred to the Combined Counties League
15	Epsom & Ewell	30	5	6	19	32	64	−32	21	Transferred to the Combined Counties League
16	Clapton	30	4	9	17	33	71	−38	18 (Note: Clapton deducted three points for fielding an ineligible player in six matches.)	Transferred to the Essex Senior League

Rules for classification: 1) points; 2) goal difference; 3) number of goals scored.

=== Stadia and locations ===
Locations of Division Two clubs
Greater London Division Two clubs
Division One Central Surrey teams

Club	Stadium
Brook House	Farm Park
Camberley Town	Kroomer Park
Chalfont St Peter	Mill Meadow
Chertsey Town	Alwyns Lane
Clapton	The Old Spotted Dog Ground
Croydon	Croydon Sports Arena
Dorking	Meadowbank Stadium
Edgware Town	White Lion
Egham Town	The Runnymede Stadium
Epsom & Ewell	Merland Rise (groundshare with Banstead Athletic)
Flackwell Heath	Wilks Park
Hertford Town	Hertingfordbury Park
Kingsbury Town	Avenue Park
Ware	Wodson Park
Wembley	Vale Farm
Witham Town	Spa Road

== League Cup ==
2005–06 Isthmian League Cup
Tournament details
- Country: England
- Teams: 61

Final positions
- Champions: Fisher Athletic
- Runners-up: Billericay Town

The Isthmian League Cup 2005–06 was the 32nd season of the Isthmian League Cup, the league cup competition of the Isthmian League. Sixty-one clubs took part. The competition commenced on 6 September 2005 and finished on 12 April 2006.

=== Calendar ===
Round	Dates	Matches	Clubs
First round	6 September	19	61 → 42
Second round	11 October	10	42 → 32
Third round	8 November	16	32 → 16
Fourth round	20 December	8	16 → 8
Quarterfinals	February	4	8 → 4
Semifinals	March	4	4 → 2
Final	12 April	1	2 → 1

=== Fixtures and results ===
Fixtures are listed in alphabetical order, not that which they were drawn in.

==== First round ====
In the First round, the thirty-eight lowest ranked clubs in the Isthmian League played each other for a place in the Second round.

Tie	Home team (tier)	Score	Away team (tier)	Att.
1	Banstead Athletic (1)	2–1 (a.e.t.)	Corinthian-Casuals (1)	57
2	Burgess Hill Town (1)	2–4	Brook House (2)	74
3	Camberley Town (2)	0–1	Edgware Town (2)	57
4	Chertsey Town (2)	1–2	Leatherhead (1)	124
5	Croydon (2)	1–3	Croydon Athletic (1)	63
6	Dover Athletic (1)	1–0	Ware (2)	301
7	Dulwich Hamlet (1)	3–1	Bashley (1)	107
8	Egham Town (2)	2–3 (a.e.t.)	Fleet Town (1)	50
9	Epsom & Ewell (2)	0–3	Hastings United (1)	39
10	Flackwell Heath (2)	1–3	Witham Town (2)	40

Tie	Home team (tier)	Score	Away team (tier)	Att.
11	Horsham (1)	6–1	Chalfont St. Peter (2)	102
12	Kingsbury Town (2)	3–1	Molesey (1)	37
13	Lymington & New Milton (1)	2–0	Kingstonian (1)	90
14	Metropolitan Police (1)	4–2	Hertford Town (2)	45
15	Ramsgate (1)	1–2	Newport IOW (1)	128
16	Tonbridge Angels (1)	3–1	Clapton (2)	170
17	Walton Casuals (1)	0–4	Tooting & Mitcham United (1)	113
18	Wembley (2)	5–2	Ashford Town (Kent) (1)	52
19	Whyteleafe (1)	1–3	Dorking (2)	57

==== Second round ====
The nineteen clubs to have made it through the First round were entered into the Second round draw with Cray Wanderers, making twenty teams.

Tie	Home team (tier)	Score	Away team (tier)	Att.
20	Cray Wanderers (1)	6–0	Kingsbury Town (2)	34
21	Dorking (2)	0–3	Edgware Town (2)	48
22	Dover Athletic (1)	5–0	Wembley (2)	314
23	Dulwich Hamlet (1)	3–2 (a.e.t.)	Banstead Athletic (1)	98
24	Fleet Town (1)	1–3	Hastings United (1)	69

Tie	Home team (tier)	Score	Away team (tier)	Att.
25	Leatherhead (1)	4–1	Metropolitan Police (1)	117
26	Lymington & New Milton (1)	1–4	Horsham (1)	31
27	Newport IOW (1)	1–2	Brook House (2)	114
28	Tonbridge Angels (1)	0–1	Tooting & Mitcham United (1)	224
29	Witham Town (2)	0–2	Croydon Athletic (1)	40

==== Third round ====
The ten clubs to have made it through the Second round were entered into the Third round draw with the twenty-two Premier Division clubs, making thirty-two teams.

Tie	Home team (tier)	Score	Away team (tier)	Att.
30	Billericay Town (P)	2–1	Maldon Town (P)	201
31	Brook House (2)	1–2 (a.e.t.)	Hendon (P)	84
32	Chelmsford City (P)	3–1	Horsham (1)	197
33	Dover Athletic (1)	2–0	Leyton (P)	324
34	East Thurrock United (P)	0–3	Heybridge Swifts (P)	66
35	Fisher Athletic (P)	4–2	Folkestone Invicta (P)	82
36	Hampton & Richmond Borough (P)	1–0 (a.e.t.)	Dulwich Hamlet (1)	104
37	Harrow Borough (P)	1–0	Windsor & Eton (P)	117
38	Hastings United (1)	2–3	Braintree Town (P)	172

Tie	Home team (tier)	Score	Away team (tier)	Att.
39	Leatherhead (1)	5–3 (a.e.t.)	Cray Wanderers (1)	121
40	Margate (P)	2–3 (a.e.t.)	Bromley (P)	345
41	Slough Town (P)	3–2	Redbridge (P)	139
42	Staines Town (P)	0–2	AFC Wimbledon (P)	622
43	Tooting & Mitcham United (1)	3–0	Edgware Town (2)	115
44	Wealdstone (P)	1–0	Croydon Athletic (1)	98
45	Worthing (P)	2–2	Walton & Hersham (P)	222
Worthing won 5–4 on penalties

==== Fourth round ====
Tie	Home team (tier)	Score	Away team (tier)	Att.
46	AFC Wimbledon (P)	0–1	Hendon (P)	835
47	Billericay Town (P)	3–1	Tooting & Mitcham United (1)	168
48	Braintree Town (P)	1–2	Wealdstone (P)	109
49	Dover Athletic (1)	0–2 (a.e.t.)	Bromley (P)	475

Tie	Home team (tier)	Score	Away team (tier)	Att.
50	Fisher Athletic (P)	2–1	Hampton & Richmond Borough (P)	113
51	Harrow Borough (P)	1–2	Worthing (P)	114
52	Heybridge Swifts (P)	2–0	Chelmsford City (P)	241
53	Leatherhead (1)	0–2	Slough Town (P)	151

==== Quarterfinals ====
Tie	Home team (tier)	Score	Away team (tier)	Att.
54	Bromley (P)	3–2	Wealdstone (P)	182
55	Hendon (P)	0–1	Fisher Athletic (P)	50

Tie	Home team (tier)	Score	Away team (tier)	Att.
56	Slough Town (P)	3–0	Heybridge Swifts (P)	157
57	Worthing (P)	1–3 (a.e.t.)	Billericay Town (P)	157

==== Semifinals ====
The Semifinals fixtures were played over two legs.

Tie	Home team (tier)	Score	Away team (tier)	Att.
58	Fisher Athletic (P)	5–2	Slough Town (P)	108
59	Bromley (P)	2–2	Billericay Town (P)	315

Tie	Home team (tier)	Score	Away team (tier)	Att.
60	Slough Town (P)	3–1	Fisher Athletic (P)	118
61	Billericay Town (P)	2–1	Bromley (P)	362

==== Final ====
12 April 2006	Billericay Town (P)	0–4	Fisher Athletic (P)	New Recreation Ground, Grays
			Barr 13', 57'; Davis 30'; Deen 69'	Attendance: 611

== See also ==
- Isthmian League
- 2005–06 Northern Premier League
- 2005–06 Southern Football League
