= Merstham F.C. =

Association football club in England

Coordinates: 51°15′29″N 0°8′48″W

Merstham
- Full name: Merstham Football Club
- Nickname: The Moatsiders
- Founded: 1892
- Ground: Moatside, Merstham
- Capacity: 2,500 (174 seated)
- Chairman: Paul Glasgow
- Manager: Jamie Decruz
- League: Isthmian League South East Division
- 2025–26: Isthmian League South East Division, 10th of 22
- Website: http://www.mersthamfc.com
Home colours	Away colours

Merstham Football Club is a football club based in Merstham, Surrey, England. Affiliated to the Surrey FA, they are currently members of the Isthmian League South East Division and play at Moatside.

== History ==
The club was established in 1892. In 1897 they were founder members of the Redhill & District League. In 1926–27 the club were Redhill & District League champions, and in 1929–30 they won the East Surrey Junior Cup. Merstham won back-to-back titles in 1934–35 and 1935–36 and again in 1949–50 and 1950–51, after which they moved up to the Surrey Intermediate League, going on to win the league at the first attempt. In 1965 the club moved up to the Surrey Senior League. They were champions in 1971–72, but left the league in 1978 to join the London Spartan League, largely composed of clubs to the north of London. Their first season in the league saw them win its Challenge Cup and the Surrey Senior Charity Cup, before winning the East Surrey Charities Cup in 1979–80.

In 1984 Merstham transferred to the Surrey-centred Combined Counties League to reduce their travelling. They were runners-up in 1987–88 and 1989–90, a season that also saw them win the Elite Cup. When the league gained a second division in 2003, Merstham became members of the Premier Division. After winning the Premier Challenge Cup in 2004–05 and finishing as runners-up in the Premier Division in 2005–06 and 2006–07 (also winning the Premier Challenge Cup and the Southern Combination Challenge Cup), the 2007–08 season saw the club win the Premier Division title, the Premier Division Cup and the Surrey Senior Cup.

Winning the Combined Counties League title resulted in Merstham being promoted to Division One South of the Isthmian League. In 2014–15 they finished fourth in the division, qualifying for the promotion play-offs. After beating Faversham Town 5–4 on penalties in the semi-finals, they defeated Folkestone Invicta 3–0 in the final to earn promotion to the Premier Division. They finished the season by winning the Surrey Senior Cup for a second time. In 2016–17 the club reached the first round of the FA Cup for the first time, losing 5–0 at home to Oxford United in front of a record crowd of 1,920. They won the Surrey Senior Cup again in 2017–18. The 2018–19 season saw them finish fifth in the Premier Division. In the subsequent play-offs, they beat Carshalton Athletic 2–1 in the semi-finals before losing the final 2–0 to Tonbridge Angels. In 2021–22 the club finished bottom of the Premier Division and were relegated to the South Central Division. At the end of the following season they were transferred to the South East Division.

== Ground ==
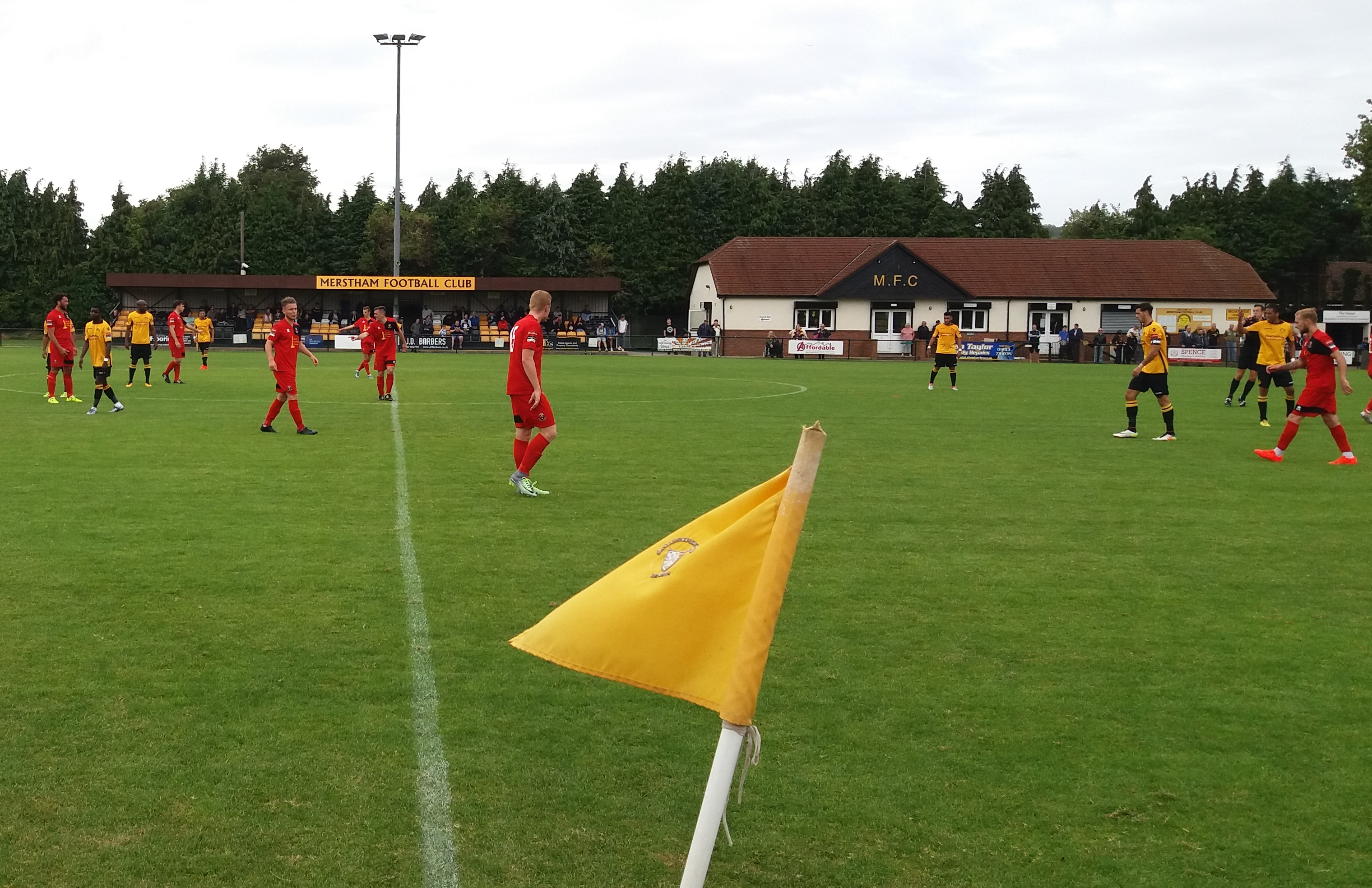
The Main stand and clubhouse

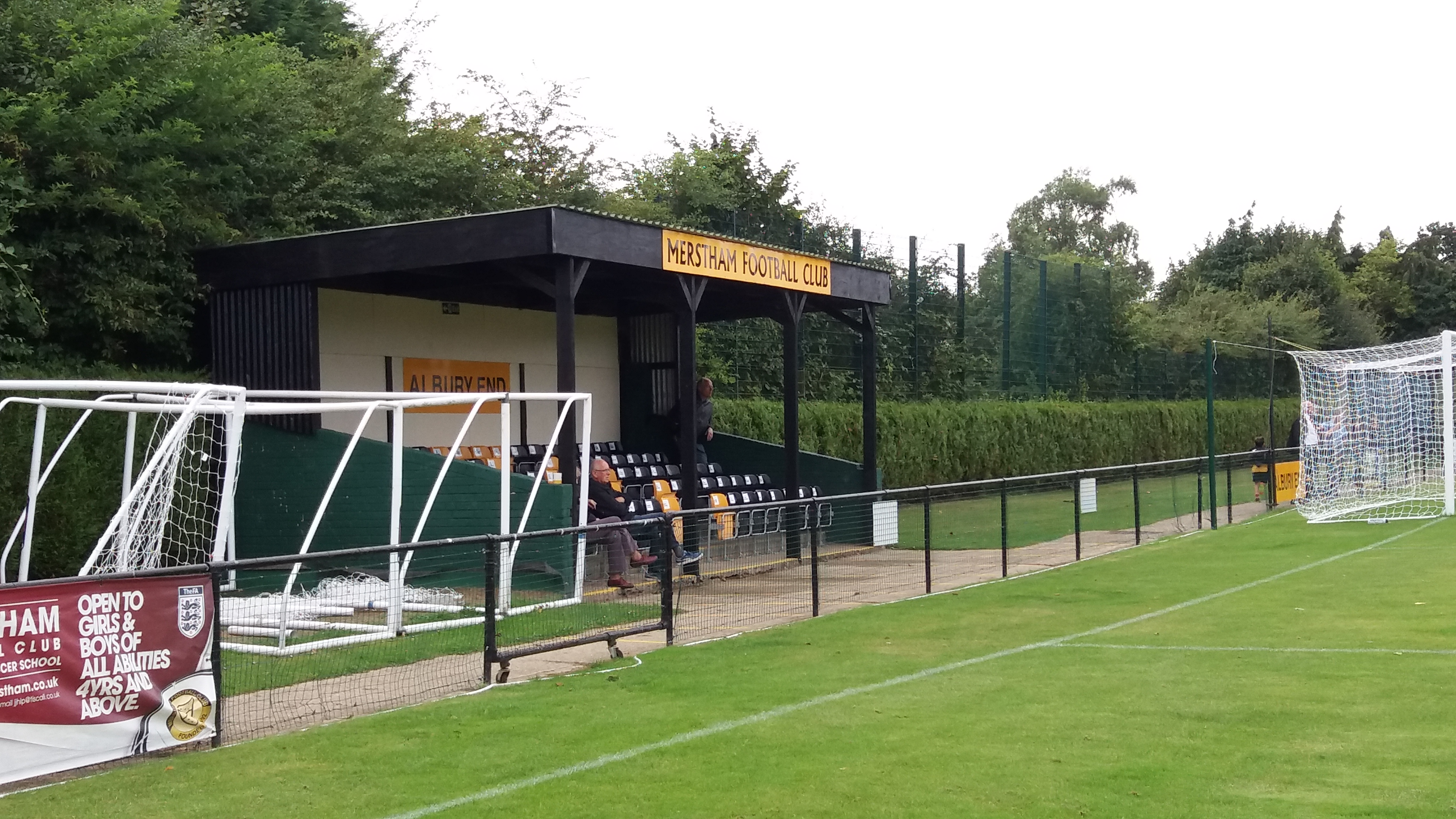
The Albury End

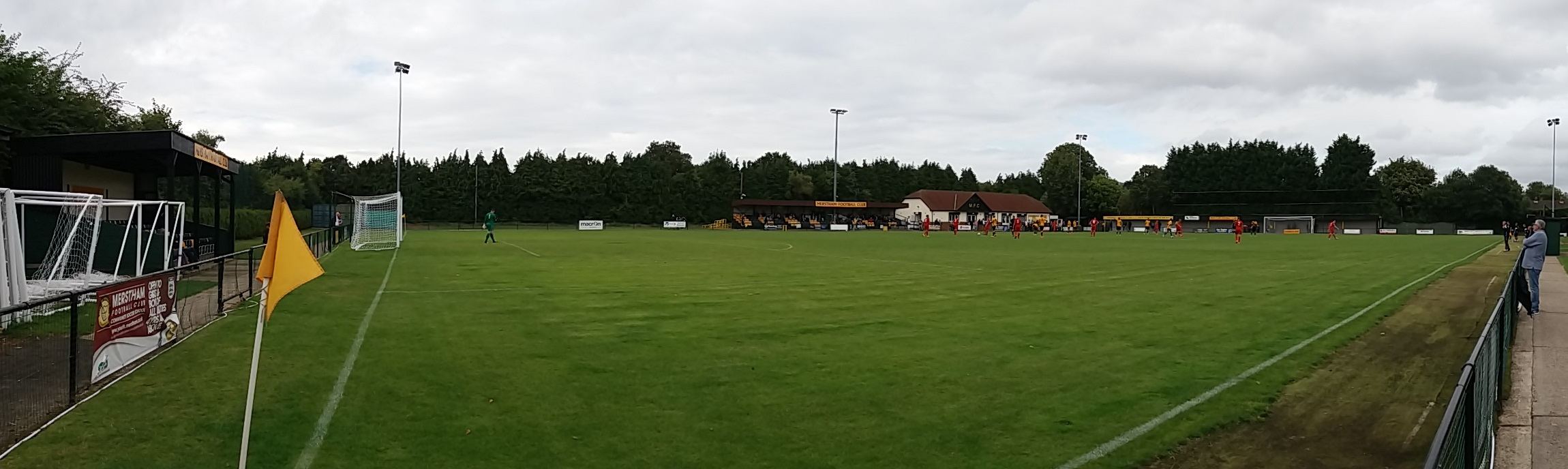
Ground panorama

The club originally played at Limeworks Meadow, a pitch based in the Merstham Lime Works. Players initially had to change in nearby hedges before being allowed to use the nearby Jollieffe Arms pub. In the early 1910s the club temporarily relocated to the Weir ground. They moved to Moatside in the early 1920s. Changing rooms were built in 1960 and a 90-capacity stand opened in 1974.

Floodlights were erected during the 1990–91 season and were inaugurated with a friendly match against Crystal Palace. A record attendance of 1,587 was set on 9 November 2002 for a league match against AFC Wimbledon. This was broken in 2016 when 1,920 watched the club's FA Cup first round match against Oxford United.

== Honours ==
- Combined Counties League
  - Premier Division champions 2007–08
  - Premier Challenge Cup winners 2004–05, 2006–07, 2007–08
  - Dan Air Class Elite Cup winners 1989–90
- London Spartan League
  - Challenge Cup winners 1978–79
- Surrey Senior League
  - Champions 1971–72
- Surrey Intermediate League
  - Champions 1952–53
- Redhill and District League
  - Champions 1926–27 1934–35, 1935–36. 1949–50, 1950–51
- Surrey Senior Cup
  - Winners 2007–08, 2015–16, 2017–18
- Surrey Senior Charity Cup
  - Winners 1978–79
- East Surrey Charities Cup
  - Winners 1979–80
- East Surrey Junior Cup
  - Winners 1929–30
- East Surrey Hospitals Charity Cup
  - Winners 2004–05
- Southern Combination Challenge Cup
  - Winners 2006–07 (shared)

== Records ==
- Best FA Cup performance: First round, 2016–17
- Best FA Trophy performance: Second qualifying round, 2009–10, 2012–13, 2016–17
- Best FA Vase performance: Quarter-finals, 2007–08
- Best FA Youth Cup performance: Fourth round, 2024–25
- Record attendance: 1,920 vs Oxford United, FA Cup first round, 5 November 2016
- Heaviest defeat: 8–1 vs Aldershot Town, FA Cup first qualifying round, 1996–97

== See also ==
- Merstham F.C. players
- Merstham F.C. managers
