= Dave Hogan =

English footballer (born 1989)

Personal information
- Full name: David Michael Hogan
- Date of birth: 31 May 1989 (age 37)
- Place of birth: Harlow, England
- Height: 6 ft 0 in (1.83 m)
- Position: Goalkeeper

Youth career
- Milton Keynes Dons

Senior career*
Years	Team	Apps	(Gls)
2005–2013	Dagenham & Redbridge	89	(0)
2007	→ Eastbourne Borough (loan)	1	(0)
2007	→ Folkestone Invicta (loan)	4	(0)
2007	→ Harlow Town (loan)	6	(0)
2008	→ Potters Bar Town (loan)	1	(0)
2009	→ Tonbridge Angels (loan)	2	(0)
2009	→ Thurrock (loan)	1	(0)
2011	→ St Neots Town (loan)	1	(0)
2011	→ Bedfont Town (loan)	1	(0)
2011	→ Aveley (loan)	7	(0)
Total		26	(0)
- * Club domestic league appearances and goals as of 03:08, 24 October 2017 (UTC)

David Michael Hogan (born 31 May 1989) is an English footballer who last played for Dagenham & Redbridge as a goalkeeper. He joined Dagenham & Redbridge in 2005, before being loaned out to non-League clubs Eastbourne Borough, Folkestone Invicta, Harlow Town, Thurrock and St Neots Town.

== Career ==
Hogan joined Dagenham & Redbridge in 2005, having come through the Waltham Forest youth system. He made his debut on 3 September 2006, in Dagenham's 5–0 away win over Altrincham in the Conference National when he came on as a substitute for Tony Roberts. In August 2007, he was loaned out to Conference South club Eastbourne Borough, making one appearance in the 1–0 away win against Hampton & Richmond Borough on 11 August. He then joined Folkestone Invicta and Harlow Town on loan later in 2007.

In the 2008–09 season, Hogan made one more appearance for Dagenham in League Two. He replaced the injured Tony Roberts as a substitute against Gillingham on 13 April, in Dagenham's 2–1 loss at Priestfield. Hogan commented on his debut admitting he fulfilled a personal dream; "It was nice to get in and play at Gillingham, I've always wanted to play in the league and now I've done it". Hogan joined Conference South club Thurrock in September 2009, making his debut in the 2–1 home win against Weymouth on 13 September.
