= Mole Valley Predators F.C. =

Mole Valley Predators
- Full name: Mole Valley Predators Football Club
- Founded: c. 1990
- 2005–06: Combined Counties League, 12/21

Mole Valley Predators Football Club was an English football club based in Leatherhead, Surrey. The club played at Combined Counties Football League level, and also featured in the FA Cup and FA Vase.

== History ==
As Chessington White Hart F.C., the club was a member of the Surrey South Eastern Combination during the early 1990s, winning three promotions in four years before joining the Surrey County Senior League in 1997–98. Changing their name to Chessington United (no relation to Chessington & Hook United) in 1998, they finished as runners-up in 1998–99 and were promoted to the Combined Counties League.

After six unsuccessful seasons in the Combined Counties League, they merged with two youth teams, Predators FC and Fetcham Park United, and changed their name to Mole Valley Predators in 2005. Finishing mid-table in 2005–06, they subsequently left the league to concentrate on youth football.

The youth team was later renamed Leatherhead Predators after an association with Leatherhead F.C., and more recently became known as Leatherhead Y.F.C.

== Records ==
- FA Cup best performance: Preliminary round 2001–02, 2003–04, 2005–06
- FA Vase best performance: Second qualifying round 2000–01, 2001–02, 2003–04, 2004–05
