= Shottermill & Haslemere F.C. =

Association football club in England

Coordinates: 51°05′40.81″N 0°44′52.56″W

Shottermill & Haslemere
- Founded: 2001
- Ground: Haslemere Recreational Ground, Scotland Lane, Haslemere
- Chairman: Tim Howard
- Manager: Terry Tallyeux-Rowden
- League: Surrey Intermediate League Premier Division
- 2024–25: Surrey Intermediate League Premier Division, 8th of 12
Home colours

Shottermill & Haslemere Football Club is a football club based in Haslemere, Surrey, England. The club are currently members of the Surrey Intermediate League Premier Division and play at Haslemere Recreational Ground.

== History ==
The club was established in 2001 as a merger of Shottermill and Haslemere. The new club initially played in the Surrey County Senior League, taking over from Shottermills league position. They joined the Combined Counties League when it formed a new Division One in 2003. In 2006 they left the CCL and dropped into the Premier Division of the Surrey County Intermediate League (Western).

Their first season in the Surrey County Intermediate League (Western), saw the club get to the final of the Surrey County Intermediate Cup, losing 2–0 to Epsom Eagles Senior.

In 2011–12, Shottermill and Haslemere finished fourth in Surrey County Intermediate League (Western) Premier, and reached the League Cup final losing 3–1 to Worplesdon Phoenix.

The club won silverware for the first time in over ten years, when the Reserves beat Staines & Lammas (Middlesex) F.C 2–1 at Westfield Stadium Woking, to lift the 2022-23 Surrey County Intermediate League Premier Reserves Challenge Cup.

== Ground ==
Shottermill & Haslemere play their home games at Haslemere Recreational Ground, Scotland Lane, GU27 3AN. Training also takes place at the Rec during summer months, with The Edge leisure centre being used throughout the course of the season.

== Staff ==
- Club Chairman – Tim Howard
- Club Secretary – Tim Howard
- Club Treasurer – Andrew Burdett
- Social Media Secretary(s) – Jozef Cole, Andrew Yates, Greg Lyall & Ben May
- 1st Team Manager – Terry Tallyeux-Rowden
- 2nd Team Manager – Alex Long
- Head of Sponsorship - Ben May

== Honours ==
=== League honours ===
- Surrey County Intermediate League (Western) Premier Division:
  - Runners-Up (1): 2012–13

*Surrey Intermediate League

  - Champions: 1947–48 as Haslemere and Shottermill, 1954–55 as Shottermill, 1960–61 as Haslemere, 1971–72 as Shottermill

*Division One

  - Champions: 1983–84 as Haslemere, 1993–94 as Shottermill, 1995–96 as Haslemere, 1996–97 as Haslemere

=== Cup honours ===
- Surrey County Intermediate Cup:
  - Runners-Up (1): 2006–07
- Surrey County Intermediate League (Western) Premier Challenge Cup:
  - Runners-Up (1): 2011–12
- Surrey County Intermediate League (Western) Reserves Challenge Cup:
  - Champions (1): 2022–23

== Records ==
- Highest League Position: 14th, Combined Counties League Division One 2003–04
