= Camberley Town F.C. =

Association football club in England

Coordinates: 51°19′36″N 0°45′27″W

Camberley Town
- Full name: Camberley Town Football Club
- Nickname: The Krooners
- Founded: 1895
- Ground: Krooner Park, Camberley
- Capacity: 1,976 (196 seated)
- Chair: Paula Jewell
- Manager: Kris Hatton
- League: Combined Counties League Premier Division South
- 2025–26: Combined Counties League Premier Division South, 19th of 20
- Website: http://www.camberleytownfc.co.uk
Home colours	Away colours

Camberley Town Football Club is a semi-professional football based in Camberley, Surrey, England. They are currently members of the Combined Counties League Premier Division South and play at Krooner Park.

== History ==
The club was established in 1895 after a discussion at St Michael's church, and was originally named St Michael's Football Club, although they became known as St Michael's, Camberley. The first match, a friendly, was played on 16 October against D Company from the Royal Military College in nearby Sandhurst; St Michael's won 4–2. In January 1896 they joined the Surrey County Football Association, entering and winning the Surrey Junior Cup in 1897–98; the club's first competitive game was played on 16 October 1897, a Junior Cup first round match against Farncombe which St Michael's won 5–2. After winning the cup, the club joined the East & West Surrey League for the 1898–99 season.

In January 1901 a public meeting was held, at which it was decided to establish a new club that would absorb both St Michael's and Camberley Magpies. The name Camberley & Yorktown was adopted and the club took St Michael's place in the East & West Surrey League. However, they dropped into the Aldershot Combination in 1902, before switching to the Ascot & District League in 1903. The club finished as runners-up in their first season and went on to win the league in 1904–05. They were runners-up again in 1905–06, before winning a hat-trick of successive titles in 1907–08, 1908–09 and 1909–10, remaining unbeaten throughout the third of the title-winning seasons. The season also saw them win the Surrey Junior Cup for a second time, beating Sutton United 2–0 in the final. In 1910 Camberley & Yorktown returned to the East & West Surrey League, which had been renamed the West Surrey League. In 1912–13 the club also entered the three-club Aldershot Senior Civilian League, which they won. They went on to win the West Surrey League the following season.

In 1922 Camberley & Yorktown were founder members of the Surrey Senior League. They won three successive titles in 1930–31, 1931–32 and 1932–33 and were runners-up in 1938–39. After World War II the club was renamed Camberley, and were Surrey Senior League runners-up in 1946–47, before winning the league's Charity Cup in 1951–52 with a 4–3 win over Chertsey Town. The club were league runners-up again in 1961–62, and adopted their current name on 2 June 1967 after merging with former Parthenon League club Camberley Wanderers. In 1973 they joined the Spartan League, but left to join Division Two of the Athenian League in 1975. In 1977 they switched to Division Two of the Isthmian League, and were promoted to Division One after finishing as Division Two runners-up in 1978–79. Two seasons later they were relegated, and after a single season back in Division Two, they rejoined the Athenian League, which now had a single division.

In 1983 Rick Wakeman became the club's chairman while he was living in Camberley. He remained in this post until 1986 when he was elected vice-president, and left the club when he moved to the Isle of Man in 1988. In 1984 the Athenian League disbanded; Camberley rejoined the Isthmian League and were placed in Division Two South, where they remained until being placed in Division Three following league reorganisation in 1991. In 1998–99 the club reached the first round of the FA Cup for the first time. Drawn against away to Third Division Brentford, they lost 5–0. Division Three became Division Two in 2002, and Camberley remained members until the end of the 2005–06 season, when they dropped into the Premier Division of the Combined Counties League. They were runners-up in the division in 2013–14 and 2014–15.

== Ground ==
In 1898 the club started playing at the new Recreation Ground on London Road, although they also used a pitch near Southwell Park Road when the Recreation Ground was unavailable and had moved there permanently by 1905. They played there until moving to Martin's Meadow in 1909. However, when the tenancy came to an end, the club returned to the Recreation Ground.

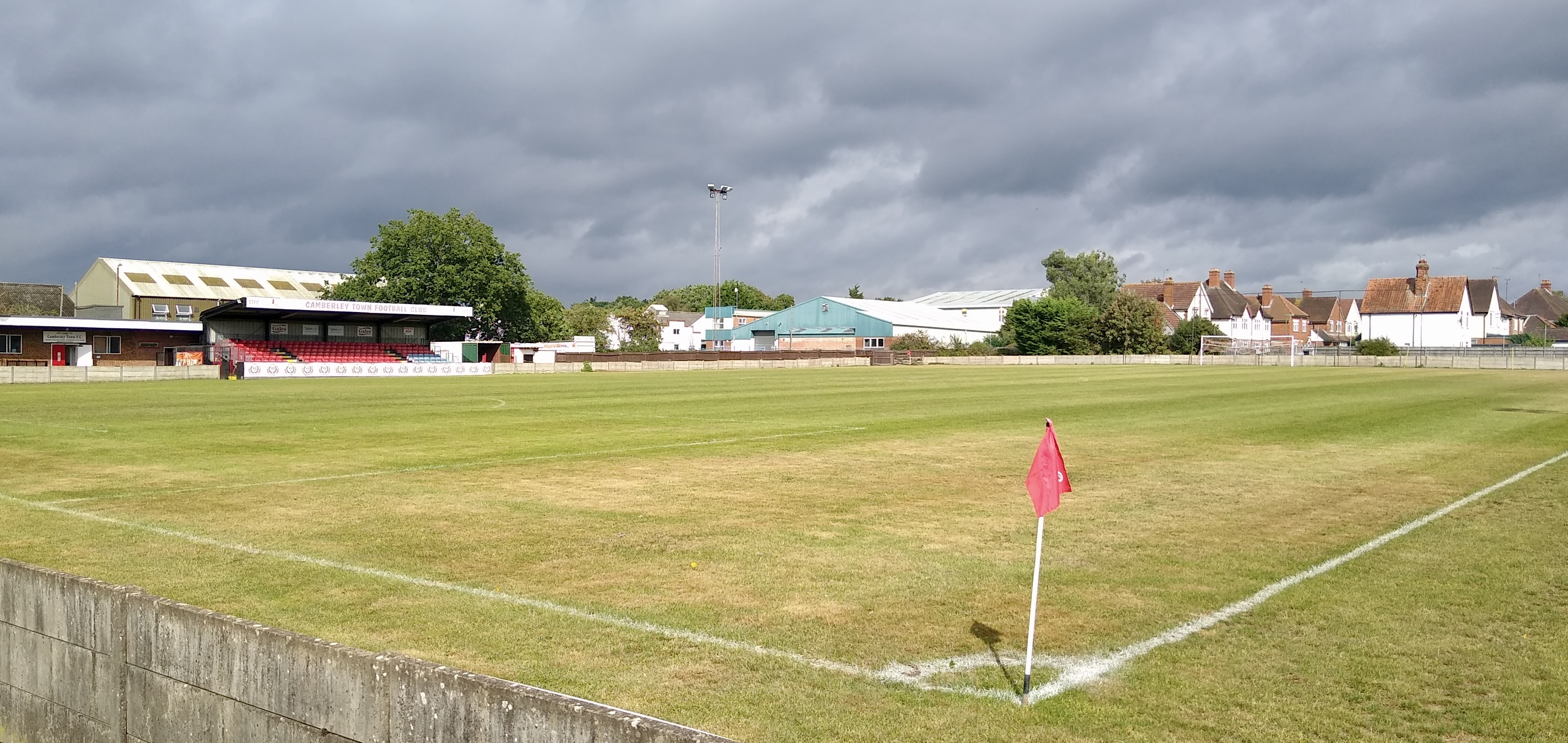
Krooner Park

Since 1923 the club have played at Krooner Park on Wilton Road. The ground was paid for with the winnings of a horse named Krooner who won two races at Haydock Park Racecourse in 1920. It was officially opened on 26 December 1923. Due to financial difficulties Krooner Park was sold back to the local council in 1939 with the council guaranteeing that the ground would be retained in perpetuity and that it would be rented to the football club, giving them priority whilst they remained in existence. In the mid-1960s the club asked the council to leave Krooner Park and build a new ground at Southcote Park Farm, but the request was rejected due to the amount of engineering that would be required.

Floodlights were installed at the ground in 1974, with the first floodlit match being a friendly against Crystal Palace on 14 October. The attendance at the match, which ended in a 1–1 draw, was around 3,100, a ground record. The highest confirmed attendance at Krooner Park was 2,066 when the newly formed Aldershot Town visited for an Isthmian League Division Three match on 10 November 1992.

== Honours ==
The Camberley & Yorktown team of 1904–05

- Combined Counties League
  - Premier Challenge Cup winners 2008–09, 2014–15
  - Development Cup winners 2021–22
- Surrey Senior League
  - Champions 1930–31, 1931–32, 1932–33
  - Charity Cup winners 1937–38, 1951–52
- West Surrey League
  - Champions 1913–14
- Aldershot Senior Civilian League
  - Champions 1912–13
- Ascot & District League
  - Champions 1904–05, 1907–08, 1908–09, 1909–10
- Surrey Senior Cup
  - Winners 1978–79
- Surrey Junior Cup
  - Winners 1897–98, 1909–10
- Southern Combination Challenge Cup
  - Winners 1980–81
- Aldershot Senior Cup
  - Winners 1996–97, 1997–98, 2006–07, 2014–15, 2015–16, 2018–19

== Records ==
- Best FA Cup performance: First round, 1998–99
- Best FA Trophy performance: Preliminary round, 1979–80, 1980–81, 1981–82
- Best FA Vase performance: Quarter finals, 1985–86, 2015–16
- Biggest victory: 25–1 vs Warfield, Ascot & District League, 12 October 1907
- Record attendance: 2,066 vs Aldershot Town, Isthmian League Division Three, 10 November 1992

== See also ==
- Camberley Town F.C. players
- Camberley Town F.C. managers
