= Horley Town F.C. =

Association football club in England

Coordinates: 51°10′32″N 0°10′53″W

Horley Town
- Full name: Horley Town Football Club
- Nickname: The Clarets
- Founded: 1896
- Ground: The New Defence, Horley
- Capacity: 1,800 (101 seated)
- Chairman: Anton James
- Manager: Tyler Chambers
- League: Isthmian League South East Division
- 2025–26: Combined Counties League Premier Division South, 5th of 20 (promoted via play-offs)
- Website: horleytownfc.com
Home colours	Away colours

Horley Town Football Club is a football club based in Horley, Surrey, England. They are currently members of the Isthmian League South East Division and play at the New Defence.

== History ==
The club was established in 1896 as Horley Football Club. In 1903 they merged with Gatwick Rovers (founded in 1903), continuing under the Horley name. After winning the Surrey Junior Cup in 1924–25 the club joined the Surrey Intermediate League. They were league champions in 1926–27. After winning the Eastern Section of the league in 1950–51, the club moved up to the Surrey Senior League. However, after finishing bottom of the league in 1954–55 and were relegated back to junior football.

In 1956 Horley moved back into the intermediate leagues. They returned to the Surrey Senior League in 1971 and were renamed Horley Town in 1975. The club won both the league title and the League Cup in 1976–77, but when the league evolved into the Home Counties League in 1978, they switched to the Premier Division of the Spartan League. After three seasons in the Spartan League the club joined the Athenian League. However, the Athenian League disbanded at the end of the 1983–84 season; although most clubs joined the Isthmian League, Horley transferred to the Combined Counties League, a renamed Home Counties League.

Horley left the Combined Counties League after finishing bottom of the league in 1995–96. After playing in the Crawley & District League, they joined the Surrey County Senior League in 2002. A third-place finish in the 2002–03 season saw them promoted to the Premier Division of the Combined Counties League. At the end of the 2005–06 season the club were relegated to Division One due to ground grading issues. However, they were Division One runners-up the following season and promoted back to the Premier Division. At the end of the 2018–19 season the club were transferred to the Premier Division of the Southern Combination. Following the 2020–21 season they were transferred back to the Premier Division South of the Combined Counties League.

The 2025–26 season saw Horley finish fifth in the Premier Division South, qualifying for the promotion play-offs. After beating Tadley Calleva 3–0 in the semi-finals, they defeated Fleet Town 4–2 in the final, earning promotion to the South East Division of the Isthmian League.

== Ground ==
The New Defence clubhouse and main stand

The club originally played at the King's Head Ground. In 1947 they moved to a new ground on Smallfield Road, the land having been given to them by A.L.N. Jennings. The ground was named "the Defence" after people who had died in defence of the UK. In 2003 the club moved to another new ground, which was named "the New Defence".

== Honours ==
- Surrey Senior League
  - Champions 1976–77
  - League Cup winners 1976–77
- Surrey Intermediate League
  - Champions 1926–27
  - Eastern Section champions 1950–51
- Surrey Junior Cup
  - Winners 1924–25

== Records ==
- Best FA Cup performance: First qualifying round, 1982–83, 1983–84, 2007–08, 2011–12, 2013–14
- Best FA Vase performance: Fourth round 2017–18
- Record attendance: 1,500 vs AFC Wimbledon, 2003–04
- Biggest win: 12–1 vs Egham
- Heaviest defeat: 8–2 vs Redhill, 1956–57
- Most goals: Alan Gates

== See also ==
- Horley Town F.C. players
