= Tongham F.C. =

Association football club in England

Coordinates: 51°14′00.05″N 0°43′37.33″W

Tongham
- Full name: Tongham Football Club
- Nickname: Redmen
- Founded: 1902
- Ground: Recreation Ground, Tongham
- Chairman: Les Oakley
- Manager: Adam Streeter
- 2025–26: Surrey Intermediate League Premier Division, 1st of 13 (promoted)
Home colours	Away colours

Tongham Football Club is a football club based in Tongham, near Farnham, Surrey, England. They play at the Recreation Ground, Poyle Road.

== History ==
Established in 1922 and played in the Surrey County Intermediate League (Western). During their early days the club played Hawley Youth Club on 3 November 1969 and this game entered the 2003 Guinness Book of Records, for the most number of booked players, as all 22 players and a linesman were booked.

The club joined the Combined Counties Football League Division One for the start of the 2005–06 campaign. At the end of the 2007–08 season the club resigned from the Combined Counties League to join the newly formed Surrey Elite Intermediate League. In 2011 they took voluntary relegation to the Surrey County Intermediate League (Western) Premier Division. Their first season back in the Surrey County Intermediate League (Western) saw them finish bottom of the division and relegated to Division One.

The 2012–13 season saw the club finish as champions of Division one, and return to the Premier Division.

== Ground ==
Tongham play their home games at Poyle Road, Tongham, Surrey, GU10 1DU.

In 2007 Tongham Parish Council opened a new community centre, built on the site of the old pavilion in the recreation ground. This modern building with improved changing room facilities and club room bar became the new home for Tongham Football Club which they also share with the village cricket team.

== Honours ==
=== League honours ===
- Surrey County Intermediate League (Western) Premier Division :
  - Winners (1): 2004–05
- Surrey County Intermediate League (Western) Division One:
  - Winners (1): 2012–13

=== Cup honours ===
- Surrey Lower Junior Cup:
  - Runners up (2): 1905–06, 1912–13

Surrey Intermediate Cup Winners 04/05 season

== Records ==
- Highest League Position: 6th, Combined Counties League Division One 2005–06
