= Surrey County Intermediate League (Western) =

Tenth tier of English league football

- Founded: 1922
- Country: England
- Confederation: FA
- Divisions: 1
- Number of clubs: 14
- Feeder to: Surrey Premier County Football League
- Relegation to: Guildford and Woking Alliance League
- Current champions: Tongham (2025–26)
- Website: FA Full-Time

The Surrey County Intermediate League (Western) is one of the three intermediate football leagues which has most of its teams in the English county of Surrey and is the smaller of the two feeder leagues to the Surrey Premier County Football League.

The current champions are Tongham.

== History ==
The league can trace its roots back to 1891 when the East and West Surrey League was formed then 're-constructed' into the West Surrey League in 1905. That, in turn, became the Surrey Intermediate League at the same time as the Surrey Senior League was formed, 1922.

== Structure ==
The league has one division for first teams (reduced from two prior to the 2023–24 season) and one division for reserves. Teams may be promoted to the Surrey Premier County Football League, or be relegated to and replaced by teams from the Guildford & Woking Alliance.

== 2026–27 members ==
=== Premier Division ===
- AFC Spelthorne Sports
- Beacon Hill
- Farnborough North End Athletic
- Hambledon
- Hart United
- Hersham
- Horsell
- Kingsmeadow United
- Lightwater United
- Manorcroft United
- Milford & Witley
- Ripley Village
- Shottermill & Haslemere
- Rushmoor Community
- Worplesdon Phoenix

== Champions ==
East and West Surrey League

Season	Champions
1891–92	Godalming Recreation Club
1892–93	Godalming Recreation Club
1893–94	Weybridge
1894–95	Guildford
1895–96	Woking
1896–97	Guildford
1897–98	Woking
1898–99	Guildford
1899–1900	Guildford
1900–01	Guildford
1901–02	Guildford
1902–03	Redhill
1903–04	Guildford
1904–05	Woking

West Surrey League

Season	Champions
1905–06	Kingston upon Thames
1906–07	Kingston upon Thames
1907–08	Woking
1908–09	Kingston upon Thames
1909–10	Old Kingstonians
1910–11	Walton-on-Thames
1911–12	Guildford
1912–13	Guildford
1913–14	Camberley & Yorktown
1914–1920	No competition
1920–21	Farnham United Breweries
1921–22	Egham

Surrey Intermediate League

Season	Champions
1922–23	Chertsey Town
1923–24	Kingstonian Reserves
1924–25	Vickers
1925–26	
1926–27	Horley
1927–28	Whyteleafe Albion
1928–29	
1929–30	Farnham Town
1930–31	Farnham Town
1931–32	Thornville
1932–33	Addlestone
1933–34	Brookwood Mental Hospital
1934–35	Brookwood Mental Hospital
1935–36	Knaphill
1936–37	Badshot Lea
1937–38	Badshot Lea
1938–39	Farnham Post Office
1939–1946	No competition
1946–47	
1947–48	Haslemere & Shottermill
1948–49	Ash United
1949–50	Cove
1950–51	Cove
1951–52	Ash United
1952–53	Cove
1953–54	Cove
1954–55	Shottermill
1955–56	Merrow
1956–57	Brookwood Mental Hospital
1957–58	Merrow
1958–59	Frimley Green
1959–60	Frimley Green
1960–61	Haslemere
1961–62	Farnborough
1962–63	Farnborough
1963–64	Cove
1964–65	Ash United
1965–66	Ham
1966–67	Ash United
1967–68	Cove
1968–69	Merrow
1969–70	Sheerwater
1970–71	Merrow
1971–72	Shottermill
1972–73	Merrow
1973–74	Cranleigh United
1974–75	Ashford Town (Middx)
1975–76	Merrow
1976–77	Cranleigh United
1977–78	Cranleigh United
1978–79	Wrecclesham
1979–80	Wrecclesham
1980–81	Witley
1981–82	Merrow

Season	Division One	Division Two	Division Three
1982–83	Ewhurst		
1983–84	Haslemere	Weysiders	
1984–85	Weysiders		
1985–86	Badshot Lea		
1986–87	Bagshot		
1987–88	Surrey Police		
1988–89	Ottershaw		
1989–90	Lion Sports		
1990–91	Burpham	Windlesham United	
1991–92	Sheerwater		
1992–93	Bisley Sports		
1993–94	Shottermill		
1994–95	Tongham		
1995–96	Haslemere		
1996–97	Haslemere	Elstead	Weysiders
1997–98	Chiddingfold		
1998–99	Merrow		
1999–2000	Merrow	Royal Holloway Old Boys	
2000–01	Woking Park & Horsell		
2001–02	Staines Lammas		Windlesham United
2002–03	Merrow		

Season	Premier Division	Division One	Reserves Premier Division	Reserves Division One
2003–04	Bedfont Green	Shalford	Bedfont Green Reserves	Shalford Reserves
2004–05	Tongham	Old Rutlishians	Yateley Reserves	Old Rutlishians Reserves
2005–06	Old Rutlishians	Knaphill	Old Rutlishians Reserves	Virginia Water Reserves
2006–07	Knaphill	Liphook	Yateley Reserves	Worplesdon Reserves
2007–08	Horsley	Worplesdon Phoenix	Yaxley Reserves	Worplesdon Phoenix Reserves
2008–09	Ripley Village	Abbey Rangers	Ripley Village Reserves	University of Surrey Reserves
2009–10	Burpham	University of Surrey	Wrecclesham Reserves	Cranleigh Reserves
2010–11	Wrecclesham	Cranleigh	Yateley Green Reserves	Unis Old Boys Reserves
2011–12	Yateley Green	AFC Spelthorne Sports	Worplesdon Phoenix Reserves	AFC Spelthorne Sports Reserves
2012–13	Merrow	Tongham	AFC Spelthorne Sports Reserves	Woking & Horsell Reserves
2013–14	AFC Spelthorne Sports	Laleham		
2014–15	Laleham	Egham Athletic	University of Surrey Reserves	Hambledon Reserves
2015–16	Laleham	Chertsey Curfews	Hambledon Reserves	Knaphill Athletic Reserves
2016–17	Royal Holloway Old Boys	Lyne	Woking & Horsell Reserves	Chobham Burymead Reserves
2017–18	Horsley	Guildford United	Woking & Horsell Reserves	Horsley Reserves
2018–19	Lyne	Knaphill Athletic	Hambledon Reserves	
2019–20	Season voided due to COVID-19 pandemic in England			

Season	Premier Division	Reserves Premier Division
2020–21	Hersham	Hambledon Reserves
2021–22	Keens Park Rangers	Hambledon Reserves

Season	Premier Division	Division One	Reserves Premier Division
2022–23	Keens Park Rangers	Laleham & Kempton	Staines & Lammas Reserves

Season	Premier Division	Reserves Premier Division
2023–24	Dial Square	Cranleigh Reserves
2024–25	Laleham	Worplesdon Phoenix Reserves
2025-26	Tongham	Cranleigh Reserves
