= Crescent Rovers F.C. =

Association football club in England

Crescent Rovers
- Full name: Crescent Rovers Football Club
- Nickname: Rovers
- Founded: 1947
- Dissolved: 2019
- Ground: Wallington Sports & Social Club, Wallington
- Chairman: Patrick Critchfield
- 2019–20: Surrey South Eastern Combination Junior Division Three (season abandoned)
Home colours

Crescent Rovers Football Club was a football club based in Wallington, Greater London, England. The club played at Wallington Sports & Social Club.

== History ==
The club was formed in 1947 by a group of ex-servicemen in the Whitehorse Manor area of Croydon. The club originally started playing friendlies and were then elected to join the Thornton Heath & District League. The club then made progress through the leagues, eventually joining the Surrey County Premier League for the 1998–99 season. They stayed in the Surrey County Premier league until the end of the 2002–03 season, when the Combined Counties League created a new Division One formed by clubs from the Surrey Premier League. During their time in Division one the club went on to win the Division one cup beating Bookham in the Final 2–1. The club remained in the Combined Counties division one until the end of the 2009–10 season when they elected to drop down to the Surrey Elite Intermediate League.

== Ground ==
Crescent Rovers play their home games at Wallington Sports & Social Club, Mollison Drive, SM6 9BY.

The ground has neither permanent spectator facilities or floodlights, which makes them ineligible to take part in the FA Vase.

== Honours ==
=== League honours ===
- Surrey South Eastern Combination Intermediate Division One:
  - Winners (1): 1997–98

=== Cup honours ===
- Combined Counties League Division One Cup:
  - Winners (1): 2004–05

== Records ==
- Highest League Position: 7th in Combined Counties Division One 2004–05
- Highest Attendance: 55 in the 2009–10 season.
