= Salfords F.C. =

English former football club, based in Salfords, Surrey

Salfords F.C. (formerly Monotype F.C.) was a non-professional (non-Football League) football club based for most of its years in Salfords, Surrey.

== Foundation ==
The large Monotype printing business with U.S. base founded its British centre on obtaining London funding in 1897 in Salfords. It occupied a growing industrial base by the railway station, Salfords, on the Brighton Main Line (from London) and men in its workforce founded the club on an informal basis before World War II. The patent-based technical printing business with a large library of type faces was known variously under brand names Monotype or Monotype Typography.

The club qualified and contributed as one of the founding clubs of the Surrey Premier League in 1982.

The business was divided up in 1992: the hardware sold to IPA Group; the type department, having produced the TrueType fonts in Windows 3.1 with Microsoft, continued as Monotype Typography, integrated into the Agfa part of Monotype's parent business in 1998. Its typefaces included Albion, Goudy Old Style and Times New Roman.

== Merger and relocation ==
In 2007, the football club merged with Coulsdon Town to form Coulsdon United in Coulsdon, Greater London, freeing up its original ground to generate capital.

== Honours ==
- Surrey Junior Cup:
  - Winners (1): 1943–44
