= Bedfont Town F.C. =

Association football club in England

Bedfont Town
- Full name: Bedfont Town Football Club
- Nickname: The Peacocks
- Founded: 1965 (as Bedfont Green)
- Dissolved: 2012
Home colours

Bedfont Town Football Club was a semi-professional football club based in Bedfont, Greater London, England.

== History ==
The club was established in 1965 as Bedfont Green, playing as a Sunday league side in the West Middlesex Sunday Football League. In 1981 the club started playing Saturday football and joined the Hounslow & District League. Five years later they switched to the Woking & District League. They gained promotion to the Surrey County Intermediate League (Western) in 2001. In 2004 they won the Premier Division title and were promoted to the Combined Counties League Division One. They finished second in their first season in the new league and gained promotion once again. In 2009 they won the Combined Counties Premier Division and were promoted into the Southern League Division One South & West for the 2009–10 season.

The club changed their name to Bedfont Town in 2010 and played their home games at The Orchard, the former home ground of Bedfont, in a ground-share with Feltham but folded in May 2012 after the club got into financial difficulties following the resignation of their chairman, and their landlords rejected a plan for the club to stay at The Orchard, thus leaving the Southern League Division One Central league, with the reserve team resigning from the Capital Reserves League.

A phoenix club emerged immediately, led by the club's former chairman, and joined the Surrey County Intermediate League (Western), but withdrew at the end of the 2013–14 season.

== Ground ==
The club initially played at Bedfont Recreation Ground (now home to Bedfont Sports) before moving to Ashford Recreation Ground on Clockhouse Lane, Ashford, where they remained until the 2000s. They then played at Avenue Park in Greenford (previously home to Viking Greenford), and shared with Yeading and Windsor & Eton before returning to Bedfont in 2010 to play at The Orchard, which they shared with Feltham. The phoenix club, founded in 2012, played at Clockhouse Lane before resigning from their league.

== Honours ==
- Combined Counties League Premier Division:
  - Winners: 2008–09
- Combined Counties League Division one:
  - Runners-up: 2004–05

== Records ==
- Highest League Position:
  - 10th in Southern league Division one Central: 2010–11
- FA CUP Best Performance
  - Preliminary Round: 2006–07, 2007–08, 2008–09, 2009–10, 2010–11, 2011–12.
- FA Trophy Best Performance
  - Second qualifying Round: 2011–12.
- FA VASE Best Performance
  - First Round: 2006–07, 2007–08, 2008–09

== Former players ==
1. Players that have played/Managed in the football league or any foreign equivalent to this level (i.e. fully professional league).
2. Players with full international caps.
3. Players that hold a club record.

- (England) Charlie Ide
- (England) Dave Hogan
- (Grenada) Byron Bubb
- (England) Louis Dennis
