= Merrow F.C. =

Association football club in England

Coordinates: 51°14′14.72″N 0°32′11.69″W

Merrow
- Full name: Merrow Football Club
- Nickname: The Robins
- Founded: 1947
- Ground: The Urnfield, Merrow
- Chairman: Jamie Balkwill
- Manager: Phil Bowers
- 2022–23: Surrey Intermediate League Premier Division, 9th of 9

Merrow Football Club is a football club based in Merrow, near Guildford, Surrey, England. They play at the Urnfield.

== History ==
Merrow were founded in 1947 and were among the founding members of the Surrey Premier League (Surrey County Senior League)

Formed in 1947, Merrow have won the equivalent to their present league eleven times since 1955–56, including the 2002–03 season. For the 2003–04 season, Merrow finished 6th out of the 18 clubs in the Combined Counties League. Thereafter, the club's performance deteriorated over successive seasons, finishing 13th (of 18 teams), 14th (of 17), 20th (of 21) and 20th (of 20). In that season, Merrow FC lost all 18 away fixtures, conceded 170 goals, and scored 24. At the season's end the club resigned from the Combined Counties League and joined the Surrey County Intermediate League (Western).

In the 2005–6 season, the average home attendance was 8, bottom of the 737 clubs in the top eleven tiers of the English football league pyramid.

In the 2012–13 season the club achieved a league-and-cup double when they finished top of the Surrey County Intermediate League (Western) Premier Division, and won the Surrey Intermediate Cup. The club was promoted to the Surrey Elite Intermediate League for the 2013–14 season.

== Ground ==
The Urnfield, Merrow

== Honours ==
=== League honours ===
- Surrey County Intermediate League (Western) Premier Division
  - Champions (11): 1955–56, 1957–58, 1968–69, 1970–71, 1972–73, 1975–76, 1981–82, 1998–99, 1999–2000, 2002–03, 2012–13

=== Cup honours ===
- Surrey Intermediate Cup:
  - Winners (1): 2012–13
