= 1994–95 Isthmian League =

The 1994–95 season was the 80th season of the Isthmian League, which is an English football competition featuring semi-professional and amateur clubs from London, East and South East England. League consisted of four divisions.

== Premier Division ==
Isthmian League Premier Division
- Season: 1994–95
- Champions: Enfield
- Promoted: Slough Town
- Relegated: Chesham United; Marlow; Wokingham Town
- Matches: 462
- Goals: 1,513 (3.27 per match)
- Highest attendance: 1,459 – Enfield – Walton & Hersham, (29 April)
- Total attendance: 207,870
- Average attendance: 450 (+3.0% to previous season)

The Premier Division consisted of 22 clubs, including 18 clubs from the previous season and four new clubs:

- Bishop's Stortford, promoted as champions of Division One
- Purfleet, promoted as runners-up in Division One
- Slough Town, relegated from the Football Conference
- Walton & Hersham, promoted as third in Division One

=== League table ===
Pos	Team	Pld	W	D	L	GF	GA	GD	Pts	Promotion or relegation
1	Enfield	42	28	9	5	106	43	+63	93	Due to Financial concerns, promotion to the Football Conference was rejected
2	Slough Town	42	22	13	7	82	56	+26	79	Promoted to the Football Conference
3	Hayes	42	20	14	8	66	47	+19	74	
4	Aylesbury United	42	21	6	15	86	59	+27	69	
5	Hitchin Town	42	18	12	12	68	59	+9	66	
6	Bromley	42	18	11	13	76	67	+9	65	
7	St Albans City	42	17	13	12	96	81	+15	64	
8	Molesey	42	18	8	16	65	61	+4	62	
9	Yeading	42	14	15	13	60	59	+1	57	
10	Harrow Borough	42	17	6	19	64	67	−3	57	
11	Dulwich Hamlet	42	16	9	17	70	82	−12	57	
12	Carshalton Athletic	42	16	9	17	69	84	−15	57	
13	Kingstonian	42	16	8	18	62	57	+5	56	
14	Walton & Hersham	42	14	11	17	75	73	+2	53	
15	Sutton United	42	13	12	17	74	69	+5	51	
16	Purfleet	42	13	12	17	76	90	−14	51	
17	Hendon	42	12	14	16	57	65	−8	50	
18	Grays Athletic	42	11	16	15	57	61	−4	49	
19	Bishop's Stortford	42	12	11	19	53	76	−23	47	
20	Chesham United	42	12	9	21	60	87	−27	45	Relegated to Division One
21	Marlow	42	10	9	23	52	84	−32	39	Relegated to Division One
22	Wokingham Town	42	6	9	27	39	86	−47	27	Relegated to Division One

Source: fchd.com rsssf.com
Rules for classification: 1) points; 2) goal difference; 3) number of goals scored.

=== Stadia and locations ===
Locations of the Premier Division clubs
Greater London Premier Division football clubs

Club	Stadium
Aylesbury United	Buckingham Road
Bishop's Stortford	Woodside Park
Bromley	Hayes Lane
Carshalton Athletic	War Memorial Sports Ground
Chesham United	The Meadow
Enfield	Southbury Road
Dulwich Hamlet	Champion Hill
Grays Athletic	New Recreation Ground
Hayes	Church Road
Harrow Borough	Earlsmead Stadium
Hendon	Claremont Road
Hitchin Town	Top Field
Kingstonian	Kingsmeadow
Marlow	Alfred Davis Memorial Ground
Molesey	Walton Road Stadium
St Albans City	Clarence Park
Slough Town	Wexham Park
Sutton United	Gander Green Lane
Thurrock	Ship Lane
Walton & Hersham	The Sports Ground
Wokingham Town	Cantley Park
Yeading	The Warren

== Division One ==
Isthmian League Division One
- Season: 1994–95
- Champions: Boreham Wood
- Promoted: Boreham Wood; Chertsey Town; Worthing
- Relegated: Dorking; Newbury Town; Wivenhoe Town
- Matches: 462
- Goals: 1,534 (3.32 per match)
- Highest attendance: 2,920 – Aldershot Town – Newbury Town, (6 May)
- Total attendance: 132,267
- Average attendance: 286 (+68.2% to previous season)

Division One consisted of 22 clubs, including 16 clubs from the previous season and six new clubs:

Clubs relegated from the Premier Division:

- Basingstoke Town
- Dorking
- Wivenhoe Town

Clubs promoted from Division Two:

- Aldershot Town
- Chertsey Town
- Newbury Town

At the end of the season Leyton who merged with Walthamstow Pennant and formed new club Leyton Pennant.

=== League table ===
Pos	Team	Pld	W	D	L	GF	GA	GD	Pts	Promotion or relegation
1	Boreham Wood	42	31	5	6	90	38	+52	98	Promoted to the Premier Division
2	Worthing	42	21	13	8	93	49	+44	76	Promoted to the Premier Division
3	Chertsey Town	42	21	11	10	109	57	+52	74	Promoted to the Premier Division
4	Aldershot Town	42	23	5	14	80	53	+27	74	
5	Billericay Town	42	20	9	13	68	52	+16	69	
6	Staines Town	42	17	12	13	83	65	+18	63	
7	Basingstoke Town	42	17	10	15	81	71	+10	61	
8	Tooting & Mitcham United	42	15	14	13	58	48	+10	59	
9	Wembley	42	16	11	15	70	61	+9	59	
10	Abingdon Town	42	16	11	15	65	69	−4	59	
11	Whyteleafe	42	17	7	18	70	78	−8	58	
12	Maidenhead United	42	15	12	15	73	76	−3	57	
13	Uxbridge	42	15	11	16	54	62	−8	56	
14	Leyton	42	15	10	17	67	66	+1	55	Merged with Walthamstow Pennant (Spartan League) to form Leyton Pennant in Division One
15	Barking	42	16	7	19	74	77	−3	55	
16	Heybridge Swifts	42	16	6	20	73	78	−5	54	
17	Ruislip Manor	42	14	11	17	70	75	−5	53	
18	Bognor Regis Town	42	13	14	15	57	63	−6	53	
19	Berkhamsted Town	42	14	10	18	54	70	−16	52	
20	Newbury Town	42	12	15	15	58	71	−13	51	Relegated to Division Two
21	Wivenhoe Town	42	8	7	27	47	94	−47	31	Relegated to Division Two
22	Dorking	42	3	3	36	40	161	−121	12	Relegated to Division Two

Source: fchd.com rsssf.com
Rules for classification: 1) points; 2) goal difference; 3) number of goals scored.

=== Stadia and locations ===
Locations of the Division One clubs
Greater London Division One football clubs

Club	Stadium
Abingdon Town	Culham Road
Aldershot Town	Recreation Ground
Barking	Mayesbrook Park
Basingstoke Town	The Camrose
Berkhamsted Town	Broadwater
Billericay Town	New Lodge
Bognor Regis Town	Nyewood Lane
Boreham Wood	Meadow Park
Chertsey Town	Alwyns Lane
Dorking	Meadowbank Stadium
Heybridge Swifts	Scraley Road
Leyton	Wadham Lodge
Maidenhead United	York Road
Newbury Town	Town Ground
Ruislip Manor	Grosvenor Vale
Staines Town	Wheatsheaf Park
Tooting & Mitcham United	Imperial Fields
Uxbridge	Honeycroft
Wembley	Vale Farm
Whyteleafe	Church Road
Wivenhoe Town	Broad Lane
Worthing	Woodside Road

== Division Two ==
Isthmian League Division Two
- Season: 1994–95
- Champions: Thame United
- Promoted: Barton Rovers; Oxford City; Thame United
- Relegated: Aveley; Windsor & Eton
- Matches: 462
- Goals: 1,528 (3.31 per match)
- Highest attendance: 578 – Thame United – Oxford City, (26 December)
- Total attendance: 45,993
- Average attendance: 100 (-55.9% to previous season)

Division Two consisted of 22 clubs, including 16 clubs from the previous season and six new clubs:

Clubs relegated from Division One:

- Chalfont St Peter
- Croydon
- Windsor & Eton

Clubs promoted from the Third Division:

- Bracknell Town
- Cheshunt
- Oxford City

At the end of the season Malden Vale resigned from the league and merged into Raynes Park to form a new club Raynes Park Vale, who joined Combined Counties League.

=== League table ===
Pos	Team	Pld	W	D	L	GF	GA	GD	Pts	Promotion or relegation
1	Thame United	42	30	3	9	97	49	+48	93	Promoted to Division One
2	Barton Rovers	42	25	7	10	93	51	+42	82	Promoted to Division One
3	Oxford City	42	24	8	10	86	47	+39	80	Promoted to Division One
4	Bracknell Town	42	23	9	10	86	47	+39	78	
5	Metropolitan Police	42	19	12	11	81	65	+16	69	
6	Hampton	42	20	9	13	79	74	+5	69	
7	Croydon	42	20	5	17	85	65	+20	65	
8	Banstead Athletic	42	18	10	14	73	59	+14	64	
9	Saffron Walden Town	42	17	13	12	64	59	+5	64	
10	Chalfont St Peter	42	17	12	13	67	54	+13	63	
11	Witham Town	42	18	9	15	75	64	+11	63	
12	Leatherhead	42	16	12	14	71	75	−4	60	
13	Edgware Town	42	16	10	16	70	66	+4	58	
14	Tilbury	42	15	9	18	62	82	−20	54	
15	Cheshunt	42	13	13	16	66	81	−15	52	
16	Ware	42	14	7	21	61	81	−20	49	
17	Egham Town	42	11	14	17	60	65	−5	47	
18	Hemel Hempstead	42	10	11	21	45	76	−31	41	
19	Hungerford Town	42	11	7	24	55	81	−26	40	
20	Windsor & Eton	42	10	8	24	58	84	−26	38	Relegated to Division Three
21	Aveley	42	9	5	28	48	95	−47	32	Relegated to Division Three
22	Malden Vale	42	5	9	28	46	108	−62	24	Resigned from the league and Merged with Raynes Park (12° Surrey County Premier League) to form Raynes Park Vale in Combined Counties League

Source: fchd.com rsssf.com
Rules for classification: 1) points; 2) goal difference; 3) number of goals scored.

=== Stadia and locations ===
Locations of the Division Two clubs
Greater London Division Two football clubs

Club	Stadium
Aveley	The Mill Field
Banstead Athletic	Merland Rise
Barton Rovers	Sharpenhoe Road
Bracknell Town	Larges Lane
Chalfont St Peter	Mill Meadow
Cheshunt	Cheshunt Stadium
Croydon	Croydon Sports Arena
Edgware Town	White Lion
Egham Town	The Runnymede Stadium
Hampton	Beveree Stadium
Hemel Hempstead	Vauxhall Road
Hungerford Town	Bulpit Lane
Leatherhead	Fetcham Grove
Malden Vale	Prince George's Playing Fields
Metropolitan Police	Imber Court
Oxford City	Marsh Lane
Saffron Walden Town	Catons Lane
Thame United	Windmill Road
Tilbury	Chadfields
Ware	Wodson Park
Windsor & Eton	Stag Meadow
Witham Town	Spa Road

== Division Three ==
Isthmian League Division Three
- Season: 1994–95
- Champions: Collier Row
- Promoted: Bedford Town; Canvey Island; Collier Row
- Matches: 420
- Goals: 1,377 (3.28 per match)
- Highest attendance: 570 – Collier Row – Canvey Island, (19 April)
- Total attendance: 47,430
- Average attendance: 113 (+27.0% to previous season)

Division Three consisted of 21 clubs, including 17 clubs from the previous season and four new clubs:

- Bedford Town, joined from the South Midlands League
- Canvey Island, joined from the Essex Senior League
- Collier Row, relegated from Division Two
- Lewes, relegated from Division Two

At the end of the season Feltham & Hounslow resigned from the league and joined the Combined Counties League. Also, club was renamed back into Feltham.

=== League table ===
Pos	Team	Pld	W	D	L	GF	GA	GD	Pts	Promotion or relegation
1	Collier Row	40	30	5	5	86	24	+62	95	Promoted to Division Two
2	Canvey Island	40	28	4	8	89	42	+47	88	Promoted to Division Two
3	Bedford Town	40	22	11	7	90	50	+40	77	Promoted to Division Two
4	Northwood	40	22	8	10	80	47	+33	74	
5	Horsham	40	22	6	12	84	61	+23	72	
6	Southall	40	21	8	11	87	59	+28	71	
7	Leighton Town	40	20	8	12	66	43	+23	68	
8	Camberley Town	40	19	8	13	59	39	+20	65	
9	Kingsbury Town	40	18	11	11	72	54	+18	65	
10	Hornchurch	40	17	8	15	64	63	+1	59	
11	Clapton	40	14	11	15	69	61	+8	53	
12	Tring Town	40	13	12	15	68	69	−1	51	
13	East Thurrock United	40	14	8	18	60	79	−19	50	
14	Epsom & Ewell	40	13	10	17	58	62	−4	49	
15	Harlow Town	40	13	8	19	53	83	−30	47	
16	Harefield United	40	12	8	20	51	79	−28	44	
17	Hertford Town	40	11	10	19	56	78	−22	43	
18	Feltham & Hounslow	40	13	4	23	64	87	−23	43	Resigned and joined the Combined Counties League
19	Flackwell Heath	40	8	4	28	50	99	−49	28	
20	Lewes	40	6	5	29	34	104	−70	23	
21	Cove	40	3	5	32	37	94	−57	14	

Source: fchd.com rsssf.com
Rules for classification: 1) points; 2) goal difference; 3) number of goals scored.

=== Stadia and locations ===
Locations of the Division Three clubs
Greater London Division Three football clubs

Club	Stadium
Bedford Town	The Eyrie
Camberley Town	Kroomer Park
Canvey Island	Brockwell Stadium
Clapton	The Old Spotted Dog Ground
Collier Row	Sungate
Cove	Oak Farm
East Thurrock United	Rookery Hill
Epsom & Ewell	Merland Rise (groundshare with Banstead Athletic)
Feltham & Hounslow	The Orchard
Flackwell Heath	Wilks Park
Harefield United	Preston Park
Harlow Town	Harlow Sportcentre
Hertford Town	Hertingfordbury Park
Hornchurch	Hornchurch Stadium
Horsham	Queen Street
Kingsbury Town	Avenue Park
Leighton Town	Bell Close
Lewes	The Dripping Pan
Northwood	Chestnut Avenue
Southall	Robert Parker Stadium
Tring Town	Pendley Ground

== See also ==
- Isthmian League
- 1994–95 Northern Premier League
- 1994–95 Southern Football League
