= 1997–98 Combined Counties Football League =

The 1997–98 Combined Counties Football League season was the 20th in the history of the Combined Counties Football League, a football competition in England.

== League table ==
Combined Counties Football League
- Season: 1997–98
- Champions: Ashford Town
- Matches: 380
- Goals: 1,401 (3.69 per match)

The league featured 19 clubs from the previous season, along with one new club:

- Chessington & Hook United, joined from the Surrey County Premier League

| Pos | Team | Pld | W | D | L | GF | GA | GD | Pts |
|---|---|---|---|---|---|---|---|---|---|
| 1 | Ashford Town | 38 | 30 | 3 | 5 | 123 | 31 | +92 | 93 |
| 2 | Reading Town | 38 | 28 | 5 | 5 | 102 | 26 | +76 | 89 |
| 3 | Ash United | 38 | 28 | 3 | 7 | 107 | 52 | +55 | 87 |
| 4 | Raynes Park Vale | 38 | 24 | 5 | 9 | 86 | 61 | +25 | 77 |
| 5 | Chipstead | 38 | 23 | 5 | 10 | 79 | 43 | +36 | 74 |
| 6 | Farnham Town | 38 | 22 | 4 | 12 | 94 | 60 | +34 | 70 |
| 7 | Bedfont | 38 | 18 | 5 | 15 | 75 | 70 | +5 | 59 |
| 8 | Godalming & Guildford | 38 | 15 | 10 | 13 | 77 | 69 | +8 | 55 |
| 9 | Sandhurst Town | 38 | 16 | 7 | 15 | 67 | 64 | +3 | 55 |
| 10 | Chessington & Hook United | 38 | 16 | 6 | 16 | 63 | 65 | −2 | 54 |
| 11 | Feltham | 38 | 15 | 7 | 16 | 70 | 71 | −1 | 52 |
| 12 | Netherne | 38 | 13 | 8 | 17 | 61 | 88 | −27 | 47 |
| 13 | Westfield | 38 | 12 | 7 | 19 | 54 | 63 | −9 | 43 |
| 14 | Viking Sports | 38 | 11 | 7 | 20 | 52 | 82 | −30 | 40 |
| 15 | Merstham | 38 | 12 | 4 | 22 | 58 | 91 | −33 | 40 |
| 16 | Hartley Wintney | 38 | 10 | 6 | 22 | 47 | 91 | −44 | 36 |
| 17 | Cobham | 38 | 9 | 7 | 22 | 55 | 73 | −18 | 34 |
| 18 | Walton Casuals | 38 | 8 | 10 | 20 | 45 | 84 | −39 | 34 |
| 19 | Cranleigh | 38 | 8 | 3 | 27 | 53 | 110 | −57 | 27 |
| 20 | Cove | 38 | 5 | 2 | 31 | 33 | 107 | −74 | 17 |

Source: nonleaguematters
Rules for classification: 1) points; 2) goal difference; 3) number of goals scored.
