= 1993–94 Isthmian League =

The 1993–94 season was the 79th season of the Isthmian League, which is an English football competition featuring semi-professional and amateur clubs from London, East and South East England. League consisted of four divisions.

== Premier Division ==
Isthmian League Premier Division
- Season: 1993–94
- Champions: Stevenage Borough
- Promoted: Stevenage Borough
- Relegated: Basingstoke Town; Dorking; Wivenhoe Town
- Matches: 462
- Goals: 1,432 (3.1 per match)
- Highest attendance: 3,005 – Stevenage Borough – Harrow Borough, (7 May)
- Total attendance: 201,909
- Average attendance: 437 (-5.2% to previous season)

The Premier Division consisted of 22 clubs, including 19 clubs from the previous season and three clubs promoted from Division One:

- Dorking
- Hitchin Town
- Molesey

=== League table ===
Pos	Team	Pld	W	D	L	GF	GA	GD	Pts	Promotion or relegation
1	Stevenage Borough	42	31	4	7	88	39	+49	97	Promoted to the Football Conference
2	Enfield	42	28	8	6	80	28	+52	92	
3	Marlow	42	25	7	10	90	67	+23	82	
4	Chesham United	42	24	8	10	73	45	+28	80	
5	Sutton United	42	23	10	9	77	31	+46	79	
6	Carshalton Athletic	42	22	7	13	81	53	+28	73	
7	St Albans City	42	21	10	11	81	54	+27	73	
8	Hitchin Town	42	21	7	14	81	56	+25	70	
9	Harrow Borough	42	18	11	13	54	56	−2	65	
10	Kingstonian	42	18	9	15	101	64	+37	63	
11	Hendon	42	18	9	15	61	51	+10	63	
12	Aylesbury United	42	17	7	18	64	67	−3	58	
13	Hayes	42	15	8	19	63	72	−9	53	
14	Grays Athletic	42	15	5	22	56	69	−13	50	
15	Bromley	42	14	7	21	56	69	−13	49	
16	Dulwich Hamlet	42	13	8	21	52	74	−22	47	
17	Yeading	42	11	13	18	58	66	−8	46	
18	Molesey	42	11	11	20	44	62	−18	44	
19	Wokingham Town	42	11	6	25	38	67	−29	39	
20	Dorking	42	9	4	29	58	104	−46	31	Relegated to Division One
21	Basingstoke Town	42	5	12	25	38	86	−48	27	Relegated to Division One
22	Wivenhoe Town	42	5	3	34	38	152	−114	18	Relegated to Division One

Source: fchd.com rsssf.com
Rules for classification: 1) points; 2) goal difference; 3) number of goals scored.

=== Stadia and locations ===
Locations of the Premier Division clubs
Greater London Premier Division football clubs

Club	Stadium
Aylesbury United	Buckingham Road
Basingstoke Town	The Camrose
Bromley	Hayes Lane
Carshalton Athletic	War Memorial Sports Ground
Chesham United	The Meadow
Enfield	Southbury Road
Dorking	Meadowbank Stadium
Dulwich Hamlet	Champion Hill
Grays Athletic	New Recreation Ground
Hayes	Church Road
Harrow Borough	Earlsmead Stadium
Hendon	Claremont Road
Hitchin Town	Top Field
Kingstonian	Kingsmeadow
Marlow	Alfred Davis Memorial Ground
Molesey	Walton Road Stadium
St Albans City	Clarence Park
Stevenage Borough	The Lamex Stadium
Sutton United	Gander Green Lane
Wivenhoe Town	Broad Lane
Wokingham Town	Cantley Park
Yeading	The Warren

== Division One ==
Isthmian League Division One
- Season: 1993–94
- Champions: Bishop's Stortford
- Promoted: Bishop's Stortford; Purfleet; Walton & Hersham
- Relegated: Chalfont St Peter; Croydon; Windsor & Eton
- Matches: 462
- Goals: 1,421 (3.08 per match)
- Highest attendance: 890 – Worthing – Bognor Regis Town, (4 April)
- Total attendance: 78,717
- Average attendance: 170 (+4.9% to previous season)

Division One consisted of 22 clubs, including 16 clubs from the previous season and six new clubs:

Clubs relegated from the Premier Division:

- Bognor Regis Town
- Staines Town
- Windsor & Eton

Clubs promoted from Division Two:

- Berkhamsted Town
- Ruislip Manor
- Worthing

=== League table ===
Pos	Team	Pld	W	D	L	GF	GA	GD	Pts	Promotion or relegation
1	Bishop's Stortford	42	24	13	5	83	31	+52	85	Promoted to the Premier Division
2	Purfleet	42	22	12	8	70	44	+26	78	Promoted to the Premier Division
3	Walton & Hersham	42	22	11	9	81	53	+28	77	Promoted to the Premier Division
4	Tooting & Mitcham United	42	21	12	9	66	37	+29	75	
5	Heybridge Swifts	42	20	11	11	72	45	+27	71	
6	Billericay Town	42	20	11	11	70	51	+19	71	
7	Abingdon Town	42	20	10	12	61	50	+11	70	
8	Worthing	42	19	11	12	79	46	+33	68	
9	Leyton	42	20	8	14	88	66	+22	68	
10	Boreham Wood	42	17	15	10	69	50	+19	66	
11	Staines Town	42	18	9	15	85	56	+29	63	
12	Bognor Regis Town	42	15	14	13	57	48	+9	59	
13	Wembley	42	16	10	16	66	52	+14	58	
14	Barking	42	15	11	16	63	69	−6	56	
15	Uxbridge	42	15	8	19	57	58	−1	53	
16	Whyteleafe	42	15	6	21	71	90	−19	51	
17	Maidenhead United	42	12	13	17	52	48	+4	49	
18	Berkhamsted Town	42	12	9	21	65	77	−12	45	
19	Ruislip Manor	42	10	8	24	42	79	−37	38	
20	Chalfont St Peter	42	7	10	25	40	79	−39	31	Relegated to Division Two
21	Windsor & Eton	42	8	7	27	47	94	−47	31	Relegated to Division Two
22	Croydon	42	3	3	36	37	198	−161	12	Relegated to Division Two

Source: fchd.com rsssf.com
Rules for classification: 1) points; 2) goal difference; 3) number of goals scored.

=== Stadia and locations ===
Locations of the Division One clubs
Greater London Division One football clubs

Club	Stadium
Abingdon Town	Culham Road
Barking	Mayesbrook Park
Berkhamsted Town	Broadwater
Billericay Town	New Lodge
Bishop's Stortford	Woodside Park
Bognor Regis Town	Nyewood Lane
Boreham Wood	Meadow Park
Chalfont St Peter	Mill Meadow
Croydon	Croydon Sports Arena
Heybridge Swifts	Scraley Road
Leyton	Wadham Lodge
Maidenhead United	York Road
Purfleet	Ship Lane
Ruislip Manor	Grosvenor Vale
Staines Town	Wheatsheaf Park
Tooting & Mitcham United	Imperial Fields
Uxbridge	Honeycroft
Walton & Hersham	The Sports Ground
Wembley	Vale Farm
Whyteleafe	Church Road
Windsor & Eton	Stag Meadow
Worthing	Woodside Road

== Division Two ==
Isthmian League Division Two
- Season: 1993–94
- Champions: Newbury Town
- Promoted: Aldershot Town; Chertsey Town; Newbury Town
- Relegated: Collier Row; Lewes
- Matches: 462
- Goals: 1,392 (3.01 per match)
- Highest attendance: 3,301 – Aldershot Town – Newbury Town, (29 March)
- Total attendance: 105,048
- Average attendance: 227 (+81.6% to previous season)

Division Two consisted of 22 clubs, including 17 clubs from the previous season and five new clubs:

Clubs relegated from Division One:

- Aveley
- Lewes

Clubs promoted from Division Three:

- Aldershot Town
- Collier Row
- Thame United

=== League table ===
Pos	Team	Pld	W	D	L	GF	GA	GD	Pts	Promotion or relegation
1	Newbury Town	42	32	7	3	115	36	+79	103	Promoted to Division One
2	Chertsey Town	42	33	3	6	121	48	+73	102	Promoted to Division One
3	Aldershot Town	42	30	7	5	78	27	+51	97	Promoted to Division One
4	Barton Rovers	42	25	8	9	68	37	+31	83	
5	Witham Town	42	21	10	11	68	51	+17	73	
6	Malden Vale	42	20	10	12	70	49	+21	70	
7	Thame United	42	19	12	11	87	51	+36	69	
8	Metropolitan Police	42	20	9	13	75	54	+21	69	
9	Banstead Athletic	42	19	9	14	56	53	+3	66	
10	Aveley	42	19	5	18	60	66	−6	62	
11	Edgware Town	42	16	10	16	88	76	+12	58	
12	Saffron Walden Town	42	17	7	18	61	62	−1	58	
13	Hemel Hempstead	42	14	11	17	47	43	+4	53	
14	Egham Town	42	14	8	20	48	65	−17	50	
15	Ware	42	14	7	21	48	76	−28	49	
16	Hungerford Town	42	13	7	22	56	66	−10	46	
17	Tilbury	42	13	3	26	59	81	−22	42	
18	Hampton	42	12	5	25	42	70	−28	41	
19	Leatherhead	42	10	6	26	46	92	−46	36	
20	Lewes	42	8	10	24	38	85	−47	34	Relegated to Division Three
21	Collier Row	42	7	8	27	37	88	−51	29	Relegated to Division Three
22	Rainham Town	42	4	2	36	24	116	−92	14	Club folded

Source: fchd.com rsssf.com
Rules for classification: 1) points; 2) goal difference; 3) number of goals scored.

=== Stadia and locations ===
Locations of the Division Two clubs
Greater London Division Two football clubs

Club	Stadium
Aldershot Town	Recreation Ground
Aveley	The Mill Field
Banstead Athletic	Merland Rise
Barton Rovers	Sharpenhoe Road
Chertsey Town	Alwyns Lane
Collier Row	Sungate
Edgware Town	White Lion
Egham Town	The Runnymede Stadium
Hampton	Beveree Stadium
Hemel Hempstead	Vauxhall Road
Hungerford Town	Bulpit Lane
Leatherhead	Fetcham Grove
Lewes	The Dripping Pan
Malden Vale	Prince George's Playing Fields
Metropolitan Police	Imber Court
Newbury Town	Town Ground
Rainham Town	Deri Park
Saffron Walden Town	Catons Lane
Thame United	Windmill Road
Tilbury	Chadfields
Ware	Wodson Park
Witham Town	Spa Road

== Division Three ==
Isthmian League Division Three
- Season: 1993–94
- Champions: Bracknell Town
- Promoted: Bracknell Town; Cheshunt; Oxford City
- Matches: 420
- Goals: 1,234 (2.94 per match)
- Highest attendance: 646 – Leighton Town – Tring Town, (27 December)
- Total attendance: 37,412
- Average attendance: 89 (-64.0% to previous season)

Division Three consisted of 21 clubs, including 16 clubs from the previous season and five new clubs:

- Cheshunt, joined from the Spartan League
- Harefield United, relegated from Division Two
- Harlow Town, returned to the Isthmian League after one season without a league football
- Oxford City, joined from the South Midlands League
- Southall, relegated from Division Two

=== League table ===
Pos	Team	Pld	W	D	L	GF	GA	GD	Pts	Promotion or relegation
1	Bracknell Town	40	25	8	7	78	29	+49	83	Promoted to Division Two
2	Cheshunt	40	23	12	5	62	34	+28	81	Promoted to Division Two
3	Oxford City	40	24	6	10	94	55	+39	78	Promoted to Division Two
4	Harlow Town	40	22	11	7	61	36	+25	77	
5	Southall	40	17	12	11	66	53	+13	63	
6	Camberley Town	40	18	7	15	56	50	+6	61	
7	Hertford Town	40	18	6	16	67	65	+2	60	
8	Royston Town	40	15	11	14	44	41	+3	56	Resigned and joined the South Midlands League
9	Northwood	40	15	11	14	78	77	+1	56	
10	Epsom & Ewell	40	15	9	16	63	62	+1	54	
11	Harefield United	40	12	15	13	45	55	−10	51	
12	Cove	40	15	6	19	59	74	−15	51	
13	Kingsbury Town	40	12	14	14	57	54	+3	50	
14	Feltham & Hounslow	40	14	7	19	60	63	−3	49	
15	Leighton Town	40	12	11	17	51	64	−13	47	
16	East Thurrock United	40	10	15	15	65	64	+1	45	
17	Clapton	40	12	9	19	51	65	−14	45	
18	Hornchurch	40	12	8	20	42	60	−18	44	
19	Tring Town	40	10	11	19	48	64	−16	41	
20	Flackwell Heath	40	9	11	20	44	83	−39	38	
21	Horsham	40	6	8	26	43	86	−43	26	

Source: fchd.com rsssf.com
Rules for classification: 1) points; 2) goal difference; 3) number of goals scored.

=== Stadia and locations ===
Locations of the Division Three clubs
Greater London Division Three football clubs

Club	Stadium
Bracknell Town	Larges Lane
Camberley Town	Kroomer Park
Cheshunt	Cheshunt Stadium
Clapton	The Old Spotted Dog Ground
Cove	Oak Farm
East Thurrock United	Rookery Hill
Epsom & Ewell	Merland Rise (groundshare with Banstead Athletic)
Feltham & Hounslow	The Orchard
Flackwell Heath	Wilks Park
Harefield United	Preston Park
Harlow Town	Harlow Sportcentre
Hertford Town	Hertingfordbury Park
Hornchurch	Hornchurch Stadium
Horsham	Queen Street
Kingsbury Town	Avenue Park
Leighton Town	Bell Close
Northwood	Chestnut Avenue
Oxford City	Marsh Lane
Royston Town	Garden Walk
Southall	Robert Parker Stadium
Tring Town	Pendley Ground

== See also ==
- Isthmian League
- 1993–94 Northern Premier League
- 1993–94 Southern Football League
