= 1995–96 Combined Counties Football League =

The 1995–96 Combined Counties Football League season was the 18th in the history of the Combined Counties Football League, a football competition in England.

The league was won by Ashford Town (Middlesex) for the second time, successfully defending their championship win the previous season.

== League table ==
Combined Counties Football League
- Season: 1995–96
- Champions: Ashford Town
- Matches: 462
- Goals: 1,587 (3.44 per match)

The league was increased from 18 clubs to 22 after four new clubs joined:

- Feltham, joining from the Isthmian League after resigning and changing their name from Feltham & Hounslow Borough F.C.
- Raynes Park Vale, a merger between Raynes Park F.C. of the Surrey County Premier League and Malden Vale F.C. of the Isthmian League. Malden Vale had been members of the Combined Counties League before, having left in 1989.
- Reading Town, joining from the Chiltonian League.
- Walton Casuals, joining from the Surrey County Premier League.

Pos	Team	Pld	W	D	L	GF	GA	GD	Pts	Promotion or relegation
1	Ashford Town	42	32	7	3	111	36	+75	103	
2	Chipstead	42	30	4	8	102	44	+58	94	
3	Peppard	42	23	8	11	86	58	+28	77	Demoted to the Chiltonian League
4	Merstham	42	22	9	11	89	66	+23	75	
5	Farnham Town	42	20	12	10	71	52	+19	72	
6	Godalming & Guildford	42	19	10	13	79	55	+24	67	
7	Reading Town	42	20	6	16	76	69	+7	66	
8	Feltham	42	18	10	14	94	86	+8	63 (Note: Feltham had a point deducted.)	
9	Bedfont	42	18	6	18	67	64	+3	63 (Note: Bedfont had three points awarded.)	
10	Ash United	42	17	12	13	74	73	+1	63	
11	Westfield	42	17	11	14	69	67	+2	62	
12	Sandhurst Town	42	18	7	17	77	89	−12	61	
13	Netherne	42	16	12	14	78	64	+14	60	
14	D.C.A. Basingstoke	42	15	6	21	56	73	−17	51	Demoted to the Chiltonian League
15	Eton Wick	42	13	11	18	71	81	−10	50	Demoted to the Chiltonian League
16	Hartley Wintney	42	13	6	23	47	88	−41	45	
17	Viking Sports	42	11	9	22	58	85	−27	42	
18	Cranleigh	42	11	8	23	70	94	−24	41	
19	Cobham	42	12	4	26	59	84	−25	40	
20	Walton Casuals	42	10	8	24	46	67	−21	38	
21	Raynes Park Vale	42	10	7	25	58	97	−39	34 (Note: Raynes Park Vale had three points deducted.)	
22	Horley Town	42	6	9	27	49	95	−46	27	Resigned to the Crawley and District League

Source: nonleaguematters
Rules for classification: 1) points; 2) goal difference; 3) number of goals scored.
