= 1991–92 Isthmian League =

The 1991–92 season was the 77th season of the Isthmian League, which is an English football competition featuring semi-professional and amateur clubs from London, East and South East England.

For the first time league consisted of four divisions after at the end of the previous season Division Two North and the Division Two South were merged into single Division Two and also Division Three was formed.

== Premier Division ==
Isthmian League Premier Division
- Season: 1991–92
- Champions: Woking
- Promoted: Woking
- Relegated: Bishop's Stortford
- Matches: 462
- Goals: 1,355 (2.93 per match)
- Highest attendance: 3,125 – Woking – Enfield, (30 November)
- Total attendance: 234,777
- Average attendance: 518 (+14.9% to previous season)

The Premier Division consisted of 22 clubs, including 19 clubs from the previous season and three new clubs:

- Bromley, promoted as runners-up in Division One
- Chesham United, promoted as champions of Division One
- Sutton United, relegated from Football Conference

At the end of the season Dagenham merged into Conference side Redbridge Forest to form new club Dagenham & Redbridge. Thus, Bognor Regis Town was reprieved from relegation.

=== League table ===
Pos	Team	Pld	W	D	L	GF	GA	GD	Pts	Promotion or relegation
1	Woking	42	30	7	5	96	25	+71	97	Promoted to the Football Conference
2	Enfield	42	24	7	11	59	45	+14	79	
3	Sutton United	42	19	13	10	88	51	+37	70	
4	Chesham United	42	20	10	12	67	48	+19	70	
5	Wokingham Town	42	19	10	13	73	58	+15	67	
6	Marlow	42	20	7	15	56	50	+6	67	
7	Aylesbury United	42	16	17	9	69	46	+23	65	
8	Carshalton Athletic	42	18	8	16	64	67	−3	62	
9	Dagenham	42	15	16	11	70	59	+11	61	Merged into Redbridge Forest to form Dagenham & Redbridge in Football Conference
10	Kingstonian	42	17	8	17	71	65	+6	59	
11	Windsor & Eton	42	15	11	16	56	56	0	56	
12	Bromley	42	14	12	16	51	57	−6	54	
13	St Albans City	42	14	11	17	66	70	−4	53	
14	Basingstoke Town	42	14	11	17	56	65	−9	53	
15	Grays Athletic	42	14	11	17	53	68	−15	53	
16	Wivenhoe Town	42	16	4	22	56	81	−25	52	
17	Hendon	42	13	9	20	59	73	−14	48	
18	Harrow Borough	42	11	13	18	58	78	−20	46	
19	Hayes	42	10	14	18	52	63	−11	44	
20	Staines Town	42	11	10	21	43	73	−30	43	
21	Bognor Regis Town	42	9	11	22	51	89	−38	38	Reprieved from relegation
22	Bishop's Stortford	42	7	12	23	41	68	−27	33	Relegated to Division One

Source: fchd.com rsssf.com
Rules for classification: 1) points; 2) goal difference; 3) number of goals scored.

=== Stadia and locations ===
Locations of the Premier Division clubs
Greater London Premier Division football clubs

Club	Stadium
Aylesbury United	Buckingham Road
Basingstoke Town	The Camrose
Bishop's Stortford	Woodside Park
Bognor Regis Town	Nyewood Lane
Bromley	Hayes Lane
Carshalton Athletic	War Memorial Sports Ground
Chesham United	The Meadow
Dagenham	Victoria Road
Enfield	Southbury Road
Grays Athletic	New Recreation Ground
Hayes	Church Road
Harrow Borough	Earlsmead Stadium
Hendon	Claremont Road
Kingstonian	Kingsmeadow
Marlow	Alfred Davis Memorial Ground
St Albans City	Clarence Park
Staines Town	Wheatsheaf Park
Sutton United	Gander Green Lane
Windsor & Eton	Stag Meadow
Wivenhoe Town	Broad Lane
Woking	The Laithwaite Community Stadium
Wokingham Town	Cantley Park

== Division One ==
Isthmian League Division One
- Season: 1991–92
- Champions: Stevenage Borough
- Promoted: Dulwich Hamlet; Stevenage Borough; Yeading
- Relegated: None
- Matches: 420
- Goals: 1,192 (2.84 per match)
- Highest attendance: 1,551 – Stevenage Borough – Hitchin Town, (7 October)
- Total attendance: 71,874
- Average attendance: 171 (-9.0% to previous season)

Division One consisted of 22 clubs, including 16 clubs from the previous season and six new clubs:

Two clubs relegated from the Premier Division:

- Barking
- Leyton-Wingate

Two clubs promoted from Division Two North:

- Stevenage Borough
- Vauxhall Motors

Two clubs promoted from Division Two South:

- Abingdon Town
- Maidenhead United

At the end of the season Harlow Town left the league due to problems with their ground and missed the next season not joining any other league.

=== League table ===
Pos	Team	Pld	W	D	L	GF	GA	GD	Pts	Promotion or relegation
1	Stevenage Borough	40	30	6	4	95	37	+58	96	Promoted to the Premier Division
2	Yeading	40	24	10	6	83	34	+49	82	Promoted to the Premier Division
3	Dulwich Hamlet	40	22	9	9	71	40	+31	75	Promoted to the Premier Division
4	Boreham Wood	40	22	7	11	65	40	+25	73	
5	Wembley	40	21	6	13	54	43	+11	69	
6	Abingdon Town	40	19	8	13	60	47	+13	65	
7	Tooting & Mitcham United	40	16	13	11	57	45	+12	61	
8	Hitchin Town	40	17	10	13	55	45	+10	61	
9	Walton & Hersham	40	15	13	12	62	50	+12	58	
10	Molesey	40	16	9	15	55	61	−6	57	
11	Dorking	40	16	7	17	68	65	+3	55	
12	Barking	40	14	11	15	51	54	−3	53	
13	Chalfont St Peter	40	15	6	19	62	70	−8	51	
14	Leyton-Wingate	40	13	11	16	53	56	−3	50	
15	Uxbridge	40	13	8	19	47	62	−15	47	
16	Maidenhead United	40	13	7	20	52	61	−9	46	
17	Harlow Town	40	11	9	20	50	70	−20	42	Resigned from the League for One Season
18	Croydon	40	11	6	23	44	68	−24	39	
19	Heybridge Swifts	40	8	9	23	33	71	−38	33	
20	Whyteleafe	40	7	10	23	42	78	−36	31	
21	Aveley	40	8	3	29	33	95	−62	27	
22	Vauxhall Motors	0	0	0	0	0	0	0	0	Club folded

Source: fchd.com rsssf.com
Rules for classification: 1) points; 2) goal difference; 3) number of goals scored.

=== Stadia and locations ===
Locations of the Division One clubs
Greater London Division One football clubs

Club	Stadium
Abingdon Town	Culham Road
Aveley	The Mill Field
Barking	Mayesbrook Park
Boreham Wood	Meadow Park
Chalfont St Peter	Mill Meadow
Croydon	Croydon Sports Arena
Dorking	Meadowbank Stadium
Dulwich Hamlet	Champion Hill
Harlow Town	Harlow Sportcentre
Heybridge Swifts	Scraley Road
Hitchin Town	Top Field
Leyton	Wadham Lodge
Maidenhead United	York Road
Molesey	Walton Road Stadium
Stevenage Borough	The Lamex Stadium
Tooting & Mitcham United	Imperial Fields
Uxbridge	Honeycroft
Vauxhall Motors	Brache Estate
Walton & Hersham	The Sports Ground
Wembley	Vale Farm
Whyteleafe	Church Road
Yeading	The Warren

== Division Two ==
Isthmian League Division Two
- Season: 1991–92
- Champions: Purfleet
- Promoted: Billericay Town; Lewes; Purfleet
- Relegated: None
- Matches: 462
- Goals: 1,375 (2.98 per match)
- Highest attendance: 363 – Billericay Town – Malden Vale, (18 April)
- Total attendance: 52,704
- Average attendance: 114

Division Two consisted of 22 clubs, including 18 clubs from the previous season's Division Two North and Division Two South and four clubs relegated from Division One:

Clubs relegated from Division One:

- Lewes
- Metropolitan Police
- Southwick
- Worthing

Clubs transferred from Division Two North:

- Barton Rovers
- Berkhamsted Town
- Billericay Town
- Hemel Hempstead
- Purfleet
- Saffron Walden Town
- Rainham Town
- Ware
- Witham Town

Clubs transferred from Division Two South:

- Banstead Athletic
- Egham Town
- Harefield United
- Hungerford Town
- Leatherhead
- Malden Vale
- Newbury Town
- Ruislip Manor
- Southall

=== League table ===
Pos	Team	Pld	W	D	L	GF	GA	GD	Pts	Promotion or relegation
1	Purfleet	42	27	8	7	97	48	+49	89	Promoted to Division One
2	Lewes	42	23	14	5	74	36	+38	83	Promoted to Division One
3	Billericay Town	42	24	8	10	75	44	+31	80	Promoted to Division One
4	Leatherhead	42	23	6	13	68	40	+28	75	
5	Ruislip Manor	42	20	9	13	74	51	+23	69	
6	Egham Town	42	19	12	11	81	62	+19	69	
7	Metropolitan Police	42	20	9	13	76	58	+18	69	
8	Saffron Walden Town	42	19	11	12	86	67	+19	68	
9	Hemel Hempstead	42	18	10	14	63	50	+13	64	
10	Hungerford Town	42	18	7	17	53	58	−5	61	
11	Barton Rovers	42	17	8	17	61	64	−3	59	
12	Worthing	42	17	8	17	67	72	−5	59	
13	Witham Town	42	16	11	15	56	61	−5	59	
14	Banstead Athletic	42	16	10	16	69	58	+11	58	
15	Malden Vale	42	15	12	15	63	48	+15	57	
16	Rainham Town	42	14	13	15	53	48	+5	55	
17	Ware	42	14	9	19	58	62	−4	51	
18	Berkhamsted Town	42	13	11	18	56	57	−1	50	
19	Harefield United	42	11	7	24	47	66	−19	40	
20	Southall	42	8	7	27	39	93	−54	31	
21	Southwick	42	6	2	34	29	115	−86	20	Resigned and joined the Sussex County League Division Two
22	Newbury Town	42	4	8	30	30	117	−87	20	

Source: fchd.com rsssf.com
Rules for classification: 1) points; 2) goal difference; 3) number of goals scored.

=== Stadia and locations ===
Locations of the Division Two clubs
Greater London Division Two football clubs

Club	Stadium
Banstead Athletic	Merland Rise
Barton Rovers	Sharpenhoe Road
Berkhamsted Town	Broadwater
Billericay Town	New Lodge
Egham Town	The Runnymede Stadium
Harefield United	Preston Park
Hemel Hempstead	Vauxhall Road
Hungerford Town	Bulpit Lane
Leatherhead	Fetcham Grove
Lewes	The Dripping Pan
Malden Vale	Prince George's Playing Fields
Metropolitan Police	Imber Court
Newbury Town	Town Ground
Purfleet	Ship Lane
Rainham Town	Deri Park
Ruislip Manor	Grosvenor Vale
Saffron Walden Town	Catons Lane
Southall	Robert Parker Stadium
Southwick	Old Barn Way
Ware	Wodson Park
Witham Town	Spa Road
Worthing	Woodside Road

== Division Three ==
Isthmian League Division Three
- Season: 1991–92
- Champions: Edgware Town
- Promoted: Chertsey Town; Edgware Town; Hampton; Tilbury
- Matches: 420
- Goals: 1,359 (3.24 per match)
- Highest attendance: 389 – Chertsey Town – Horsham, (2 May)
- Total attendance: 38,463
- Average attendance: 92

At the end of the previous season Division Two North and Division Two South were merged resulting in creation of Division Three.

Division Three consisted of 21 clubs, including 20 clubs from the previous season's Division Two North and Division Two South and one new club:

Club joined from the South Midlands League:

- Thame United

Clubs relegated from Division Two North:

- Clapton
- Collier Row
- Edgware Town
- Hertford Town
- Hornchurch
- Kingsbury Town
- Royston Town
- Tilbury
- Tring Town

Clubs relegated from Division Two South:

- Bracknell Town
- Camberley Town
- Chertsey Town
- Cove
- Eastbourne United
- Epsom & Ewell
- Feltham
- Flackwell Heath
- Hampton
- Horsham
- Petersfield United

Before the season started Feltham merged with the Hellenic League side Hounslow to create Feltham & Hounslow Borough F.C.

=== League table ===
Pos	Team	Pld	W	D	L	GF	GA	GD	Pts	Promotion or relegation
1	Edgware Town	40	30	3	7	106	44	+62	93	Promoted to Division Two
2	Chertsey Town	40	29	4	7	115	44	+71	91	Promoted to Division Two
3	Tilbury	40	26	9	5	84	40	+44	87	Promoted to Division Two
4	Hampton	40	26	5	9	93	35	+58	83	Promoted to Division Two
5	Horsham	40	23	8	9	92	51	+41	77	
6	Cove	40	21	9	10	74	49	+25	72	
7	Flackwell Heath	40	19	12	9	78	50	+28	69	
8	Thame United	40	19	7	14	73	46	+27	64	
9	Epsom & Ewell	40	17	11	12	55	50	+5	62	
10	Collier Row	40	17	9	14	67	59	+8	60	
11	Royston Town	40	17	7	16	59	58	+1	58	
12	Kingsbury Town	40	12	10	18	54	61	−7	46	
13	Hertford Town	40	12	10	18	55	73	−18	46	
14	Petersfield United	40	12	9	19	45	67	−22	45	
15	Camberley Town	40	11	8	21	52	69	−17	41	
16	Feltham & Hounslow	40	11	7	22	53	78	−25	40	
17	Bracknell Town	40	10	7	23	48	90	−42	37	
18	Hornchurch	40	8	7	25	40	87	−47	31	
19	Tring Town	40	9	4	27	35	94	−59	31	
20	Clapton	40	9	3	28	47	93	−46	30	
21	Eastbourne United	40	5	5	30	34	121	−87	20	Resigned and joined the Sussex County League Division Two

Source: fchd.com rsssf.com
Rules for classification: 1) points; 2) goal difference; 3) number of goals scored.

=== Stadia and locations ===
Locations of the Division Three clubs
Greater London Division Three football clubs

Club	Stadium
Bracknell Town	Larges Lane
Camberley Town	Kroomer Park
Chertsey Town	Alwyns Lane
Clapton	The Old Spotted Dog Ground
Collier Row	Sungate
Cove	Oak Farm
Eastbourne United	The Oval
Edgware Town	White Lion
Epsom & Ewell	Merland Rise (groundshare with Banstead Athletic)
Feltham & Hounslow	The Orchard
Flackwell Heath	Wilks Park
Hampton	Beveree Stadium
Hertford Town	Hertingfordbury Park
Hornchurch	Hornchurch Stadium
Horsham	Queen Street
Kingsbury Town	Avenue Park
Petersfield United	The Southdowns Builders Stadium
Royston Town	Garden Walk
Thame United	Windmill Road
Tilbury	Chadfields
Tring Town	Pendley Ground

== See also ==
- Isthmian League
- 1991–92 Northern Premier League
- 1991–92 Southern Football League
