= 1998–99 Combined Counties Football League =

The 1998–99 Combined Counties Football League season was the 21st in the history of the Combined Counties Football League, a football competition in England.

== League table ==
Combined Counties Football League
- Season: 1998–99
- Champions: Ash United
- Matches: 420
- Goals: 1,546 (3.68 per match)

The league featured 20 clubs from the previous season, along with one new club:

- AFC Wallingford, joined from the Chiltonian League

Also, Netherne changed their name to Netherne Village.

| Pos | Team | Pld | W | D | L | GF | GA | GD | Pts | Promotion or relegation |
|---|---|---|---|---|---|---|---|---|---|---|
| 1 | Ash United | 40 | 31 | 3 | 6 | 115 | 46 | +69 | 96 | |
| 2 | Cobham | 40 | 24 | 11 | 5 | 108 | 50 | +58 | 83 | |
| 3 | Chipstead | 40 | 25 | 8 | 7 | 82 | 39 | +43 | 83 | |
| 4 | Ashford Town | 40 | 24 | 7 | 9 | 102 | 50 | +52 | 79 | |
| 5 | Bedfont | 40 | 23 | 5 | 12 | 97 | 66 | +31 | 74 | |
| 6 | Godalming & Guildford | 40 | 23 | 3 | 14 | 79 | 58 | +21 | 72 | |
| 7 | Reading Town | 40 | 21 | 7 | 12 | 73 | 55 | +18 | 70 | |
| 8 | AFC Wallingford | 40 | 20 | 9 | 11 | 104 | 62 | +42 | 69 | |
| 9 | Westfield | 40 | 19 | 8 | 13 | 52 | 45 | +7 | 65 | |
| 10 | Chessington & Hook United | 40 | 18 | 4 | 18 | 77 | 67 | +10 | 58 | |
| 11 | Merstham | 40 | 16 | 8 | 16 | 75 | 67 | +8 | 56 | |
| 12 | Raynes Park Vale | 40 | 16 | 8 | 16 | 73 | 70 | +3 | 56 | |
| 13 | Farnham Town | 40 | 16 | 7 | 17 | 89 | 73 | +16 | 55 | |
| 14 | Feltham | 40 | 16 | 7 | 17 | 53 | 57 | −4 | 55 | |
| 15 | Sandhurst Town | 40 | 13 | 8 | 19 | 63 | 92 | −29 | 47 | |
| 16 | Viking Sports | 40 | 12 | 5 | 23 | 56 | 97 | −41 | 41 | |
| 17 | Walton Casuals | 40 | 9 | 6 | 25 | 60 | 88 | −28 | 33 | |
| 18 | Cranleigh | 40 | 9 | 4 | 27 | 60 | 122 | −62 | 31 | |
| 19 | Netherne Village | 40 | 9 | 4 | 27 | 51 | 120 | −69 | 31 | Demoted to the Surrey County Premier League |
| 20 | Hartley Wintney | 40 | 7 | 9 | 24 | 50 | 87 | −37 | 30 | |
| 21 | Cove | 40 | 3 | 1 | 36 | 27 | 135 | −108 | 10 | |

Source: nonleaguematters
Rules for classification: 1) points; 2) goal difference; 3) number of goals scored.
