= 1992–93 Isthmian League =

The 1992–93 season was the 78th season of the Isthmian League, which is an English football competition featuring semi-professional and amateur clubs from London, East and South East England. League consisted of four divisions.

== Premier Division ==
Isthmian League Premier Division
- Season: 1992–93
- Champions: Chesham United
- Promoted: None
- Relegated: Bognor Regis Town; Staines Town; Windsor & Eton
- Matches: 462
- Goals: 1,428 (3.09 per match)
- Highest attendance: 3,120 – St Albans City – Chesham United, (13 February)
- Total attendance: 212,741
- Average attendance: 461 (-9.2% to previous season)

The Premier Division consisted of 22 clubs, including 19 clubs from the previous season and three clubs promoted from Division One:

- Dulwich Hamlet
- Stevenage Borough
- Yeading

No teams were promoted this year after Chesham United and St Albans City were denied due to ground grading.

=== League table ===
Pos	Team	Pld	W	D	L	GF	GA	GD	Pts	Promotion or relegation
1	Chesham United	42	30	8	4	104	34	+70	98	
2	St Albans City	42	28	9	5	103	50	+53	93	
3	Enfield	42	25	6	11	94	48	+46	81	
4	Carshalton Athletic	42	22	10	10	96	56	+40	76	
5	Sutton United	42	18	14	10	74	57	+17	68	
6	Grays Athletic	42	18	11	13	61	64	−3	65	
7	Stevenage Borough	42	18	8	16	62	60	+2	62	
8	Harrow Borough	42	16	14	12	59	60	−1	62	
9	Hayes	42	16	13	13	64	59	+5	61	
10	Aylesbury United	42	18	6	18	70	77	−7	60	
11	Hendon	42	12	18	12	52	54	−2	54	
12	Basingstoke Town	42	12	17	13	49	45	+4	53	
13	Kingstonian	42	14	10	18	59	58	+1	52	
14	Dulwich Hamlet	42	12	14	16	52	66	−14	50	
15	Marlow	42	12	11	19	72	73	−1	47	
16	Wokingham Town	42	11	13	18	62	81	−19	46	
17	Bromley	42	11	13	18	51	72	−21	46	
18	Wivenhoe Town	42	13	7	22	41	75	−34	46	
19	Yeading	42	11	12	19	58	66	−8	45	
20	Staines Town	42	10	13	19	59	77	−18	43	Relegated to Division One
21	Windsor & Eton	42	8	7	27	40	90	−50	31	Relegated to Division One
22	Bognor Regis Town	42	5	10	27	46	106	−60	25	Relegated to Division One

Source: fchd.com rsssf.com
Rules for classification: 1) points; 2) goal difference; 3) number of goals scored.

=== Stadia and locations ===
Locations of the Premier Division clubs
Greater London Premier Division football clubs

Club	Stadium
Aylesbury United	Buckingham Road
Basingstoke Town	The Camrose
Bognor Regis Town	Nyewood Lane
Bromley	Hayes Lane
Carshalton Athletic	War Memorial Sports Ground
Chesham United	The Meadow
Enfield	Southbury Road
Dulwich Hamlet	Champion Hill
Grays Athletic	New Recreation Ground
Hayes	Church Road
Harrow Borough	Earlsmead Stadium
Hendon	Claremont Road
Kingstonian	Kingsmeadow
Marlow	Alfred Davis Memorial Ground
St Albans City	Clarence Park
Staines Town	Wheatsheaf Park
Stevenage Borough	The Lamex Stadium
Sutton United	Gander Green Lane
Windsor & Eton	Stag Meadow
Wivenhoe Town	Broad Lane
Wokingham Town	Cantley Park
Yeading	The Warren

== Division One ==
Isthmian League Division One
- Season: 1992–93
- Champions: Hitchin Town
- Promoted: Dorking; Hitchin Town; Molesey
- Relegated: Lewes; Aveley
- Matches: 420
- Goals: 1,181 (2.81 per match)
- Highest attendance: 804 – Hitchin Town – Uxbridge, (1 May)
- Total attendance: 68,130
- Average attendance: 162 (-5.3% to previous season)

Division One consisted of 21 clubs, including 17 clubs from the previous season and four new clubs:

- Billericay Town, promoted as third in Division Two
- Bishop's Stortford, relegated from the Premier Division
- Lewes, promoted as runners-up in Division Two
- Purfleet, promoted as champions of Division Two

Before the start of the season Leyton-Wingate changed name to Leyton.

=== League table ===
Pos	Team	Pld	W	D	L	GF	GA	GD	Pts	Promotion or relegation
1	Hitchin Town	40	25	7	8	67	29	+38	82	Promoted to the Premier Division
2	Molesey	40	23	11	6	81	38	+43	80	Promoted to the Premier Division
3	Dorking	40	23	9	8	73	40	+33	78	Promoted to the Premier Division
4	Purfleet	40	19	12	9	67	42	+25	69	
5	Bishop's Stortford	40	19	10	11	63	42	+21	67	
6	Abingdon Town	40	17	13	10	65	47	+18	64	
7	Tooting & Mitcham United	40	17	12	11	68	46	+22	63	
8	Billericay Town	40	18	6	16	67	61	+6	60	
9	Wembley	40	14	15	11	44	34	+10	57	
10	Walton & Hersham	40	14	12	14	58	54	+4	54	
11	Boreham Wood	40	12	14	14	44	43	+1	50	
12	Maidenhead United	40	10	18	12	45	50	−5	48	
13	Leyton	40	11	14	15	56	61	−5	47	
14	Whyteleafe	40	12	10	18	63	71	−8	46	
15	Uxbridge	40	11	13	16	50	59	−9	46	
16	Heybridge Swifts	40	11	9	20	47	65	−18	42	
17	Croydon	40	11	9	20	54	82	−28	42	
18	Chalfont St Peter	40	7	17	16	48	70	−22	38	
19	Barking	40	10	8	22	42	80	−38	38	
20	Lewes	40	9	10	21	34	80	−46	37	Relegated to Division Two
21	Aveley	40	9	7	24	45	87	−42	34	Relegated to Division Two

Source: fchd.com rsssf.com
Rules for classification: 1) points; 2) goal difference; 3) number of goals scored.

=== Stadia and locations ===
Locations of the Division One clubs
Greater London Division One football clubs

Club	Stadium
Abingdon Town	Culham Road
Aveley	The Mill Field
Barking	Mayesbrook Park
Billericay Town	New Lodge
Bishop's Stortford	Woodside Park
Boreham Wood	Meadow Park
Chalfont St Peter	Mill Meadow
Croydon	Croydon Sports Arena
Dorking	Meadowbank Stadium
Heybridge Swifts	Scraley Road
Hitchin Town	Top Field
Lewes	The Dripping Pan
Leyton	Wadham Lodge
Maidenhead United	York Road
Molesey	Walton Road Stadium
Purfleet	Ship Lane
Tooting & Mitcham United	Imperial Fields
Uxbridge	Honeycroft
Walton & Hersham	The Sports Ground
Wembley	Vale Farm
Whyteleafe	Church Road

== Division Two ==
Isthmian League Division Two
- Season: 1992–93
- Champions: Worthing
- Promoted: Berkhamsted Town; Ruislip Manor; Worthing
- Relegated: Harefield United; Southall
- Matches: 462
- Goals: 1,432 (3.1 per match)
- Highest attendance: 1,130 – Hemel Hempstead – Berkhamsted Town, (12 April)
- Total attendance: 57,883
- Average attendance: 125 (+9.6% to previous season)

Division Two consisted of 22 clubs, including 18 clubs from the previous season and four clubs promoted from Division Three:

- Chertsey Town
- Edgware Town
- Hampton
- Tilbury

=== League table ===
Pos	Team	Pld	W	D	L	GF	GA	GD	Pts	Promotion or relegation
1	Worthing	42	28	7	7	105	50	+55	91	Promoted to Division One
2	Ruislip Manor	42	25	12	5	78	33	+45	87	Promoted to Division One
3	Berkhamsted Town	42	24	8	10	77	55	+22	80	Promoted to Division One
4	Hemel Hempstead	42	22	12	8	84	52	+32	78	
5	Metropolitan Police	42	22	6	14	84	51	+33	72	
6	Malden Vale	42	20	9	13	78	54	+24	69	
7	Chertsey Town	42	20	7	15	84	60	+24	67	
8	Saffron Walden Town	42	19	10	13	63	49	+14	67	
9	Newbury Town	42	14	18	10	53	51	+2	60	
10	Hampton	42	16	11	15	59	59	0	59	
11	Edgware Town	42	16	10	16	84	75	+9	58	
12	Egham Town	42	16	9	17	60	71	−11	57	
13	Banstead Athletic	42	14	13	15	67	52	+15	55	
14	Leatherhead	42	14	11	17	66	61	+5	53	
15	Ware	42	12	11	19	68	76	−8	47	
16	Witham Town	42	10	16	16	54	65	−11	46	
17	Tilbury	42	12	8	22	55	101	−46	44	
18	Barton Rovers	42	9	14	19	40	66	−26	41	
19	Hungerford Town	42	11	8	23	37	93	−56	41	
20	Rainham Town	42	9	10	23	56	80	−24	37	
21	Harefield United	42	10	7	25	37	72	−35	37	Relegated to Division Three
22	Southall	42	7	7	28	43	106	−63	28	Relegated to Division Three

Source: fchd.com rsssf.com
Rules for classification: 1) points; 2) goal difference; 3) number of goals scored.

=== Stadia and locations ===
Locations of the Division Two clubs
Greater London Division Two football clubs

Club	Stadium
Banstead Athletic	Merland Rise
Barton Rovers	Sharpenhoe Road
Berkhamsted Town	Broadwater
Chertsey Town	Alwyns Lane
Edgware Town	White Lion
Egham Town	The Runnymede Stadium
Hampton	Beveree Stadium
Harefield United	Preston Park
Hemel Hempstead	Vauxhall Road
Hungerford Town	Bulpit Lane
Leatherhead	Fetcham Grove
Malden Vale	Prince George's Playing Fields
Metropolitan Police	Imber Court
Newbury Town	Town Ground
Rainham Town	Deri Park
Ruislip Manor	Grosvenor Vale
Saffron Walden Town	Catons Lane
Southall	Robert Parker Stadium
Tilbury	Chadfields
Ware	Wodson Park
Witham Town	Spa Road
Worthing	Woodside Road

== Division Three ==
Isthmian League Division Three
- Season: 1992–93
- Champions: Aldershot Town
- Promoted: Aldershot Town; Collier Row; Thame United
- Matches: 380
- Goals: 1,262 (3.32 per match)
- Highest attendance: 2,923 – Aldershot Town – Collier Row, (23 January)
- Total attendance: 93,814
- Average attendance: 247 (+168.5% to previous season)

Division Three consisted of 21 clubs, including 16 clubs from the previous season and five new clubs:

- Aldershot Town, newly created club
- East Thurrock United, joined from the Essex Senior League
- Farnham Town, joined from the Combined Counties League
- Leighton Town, joined from the South Midlands League
- Northwood, joined from the Spartan League

Although, Farnham Town were accepted to the league, club never started the season due to ground grading problems and returned to the Combined Counties League for the 1993–94 season.

=== League table ===
Pos	Team	Pld	W	D	L	GF	GA	GD	Pts	Promotion or relegation
1	Aldershot Town	38	28	8	2	90	35	+55	92	Promoted to Division Two
2	Thame United	38	21	11	6	84	38	+46	74	Promoted to Division Two
3	Collier Row	38	21	11	6	68	30	+38	74	Promoted to Division Two
4	Leighton Town	38	21	10	7	89	47	+42	73	
5	Cove	38	21	8	9	69	42	+27	71	
6	Northwood	38	19	11	8	84	68	+16	68	
7	Royston Town	38	17	8	13	59	42	+17	59	
8	East Thurrock United	38	17	7	14	69	58	+11	58	
9	Kingsbury Town	38	15	9	14	62	59	+3	54	
10	Hertford Town	38	14	10	14	61	64	−3	52	
11	Flackwell Heath	38	15	6	17	82	76	+6	51	
12	Tring Town	38	12	11	15	59	63	−4	47	
13	Hornchurch	38	11	13	14	53	52	+1	46	
14	Horsham	38	12	7	19	63	72	−9	43	
15	Epsom & Ewell	38	10	11	17	52	67	−15	41	
16	Bracknell Town	38	7	13	18	52	94	−42	34	
17	Clapton	38	8	7	23	46	74	−28	31	
18	Camberley Town	38	8	7	23	37	72	−35	31	
19	Petersfield United	38	6	12	20	36	90	−54	30	Club folded
20	Feltham & Hounslow	38	5	4	29	47	119	−72	19	
21	Farnham Town	0	0	0	0	0	0	0	0	Resigned and joined the Combined Counties League

Source: fchd.com rsssf.com
Rules for classification: 1) points; 2) goal difference; 3) number of goals scored.

=== Stadia and locations ===
Locations of the Division Three clubs
Greater London Division Three football clubs

Club	Stadium
Aldershot Town	Recreation Ground
Bracknell Town	Larges Lane
Camberley Town	Kroomer Park
Clapton	The Old Spotted Dog Ground
Collier Row	Sungate
Cove	Oak Farm
East Thurrock United	Rookery Hill
Epsom & Ewell	Merland Rise (groundshare with Banstead Athletic)
Farnham Town	The Memorial Ground
Feltham & Hounslow	The Orchard
Flackwell Heath	Wilks Park
Hertford Town	Hertingfordbury Park
Hornchurch	Hornchurch Stadium
Horsham	Queen Street
Kingsbury Town	Avenue Park
Leighton Town	Bell Close
Northwood	Chestnut Avenue
Petersfield United	The Southdowns Builders Stadium
Royston Town	Garden Walk
Thame United	Windmill Road
Tring Town	Pendley Ground

== See also ==
- Isthmian League
- 1992–93 Northern Premier League
- 1992–93 Southern Football League
