= 1994–95 Combined Counties Football League =

The 1994–95 Combined Counties Football League season was the 17th in the history of the Combined Counties Football League, a football competition in England.

The league was won by Ashford Town (Middlesex) for the first time.

== League table ==
Combined Counties Football League
- Season: 1994–95
- Champions: Ashford Town
- Matches: 306
- Goals: 1,027 (3.36 per match)

The league was reduced from 21 clubs to 18 after Ditton, Farleigh Rovers and Virginia Water joined the Surrey County Premier League, and Frimley Green joined the Surrey Intermediate League. One new club joined:

- Netherne, joining from the Surrey County Premier League.

Pos	Team	Pld	W	D	L	GF	GA	GD	Pts
1	Ashford Town	34	25	6	3	89	27	+62	81
2	Viking Sports	34	21	5	8	70	33	+37	68
3	Netherne	34	21	4	9	82	58	+24	67
4	Godalming & Guildford	34	20	5	9	66	47	+19	64 (Note: Godalming & Guildford had a point deducted.)
5	Horley Town	34	16	6	12	54	65	−11	54
6	Bedfont	34	15	6	13	65	55	+10	51
7	Cranleigh	34	16	2	16	61	61	0	50
8	Chipstead	34	13	9	12	47	46	+1	48
9	D.C.A. Basingstoke	34	13	8	13	53	48	+5	47
10	Sandhurst Town	34	12	8	14	58	61	−3	44
11	Cobham	34	12	8	14	53	56	−3	44
12	Westfield	34	13	5	16	45	56	−11	44
13	Eton Wick	34	12	6	16	58	57	+1	41 (Note: Eton Wick had a point deducted.)
14	Peppard	34	11	6	17	53	56	−3	39
15	Merstham	34	9	9	16	38	64	−26	36
16	Hartley Wintney	34	9	7	18	49	71	−22	34
17	Ash United	34	9	7	18	49	73	−24	34
18	Farnham Town	34	2	7	25	37	93	−56	13

Source: nonleaguematters
Rules for classification: 1) points; 2) goal difference; 3) number of goals scored.
