= 1999–2000 Combined Counties Football League =

Combined Counties Football League
- Season: 1999–2000
- Champions: Ashford Town
- Promoted: Ashford Town
- Matches: 420
- Goals: 1,518 (3.61 per match)

The 1999–2000 Combined Counties Football League season was the 22nd in the history of the Combined Counties Football League, a football competition in England.

== League table ==
The league featured 20 clubs from the previous season, along with one new club:

- Chessington United, joined from the Surrey County Premier League

Also, Viking Sports changed their name to Viking Greenford.

Pos	Team	Pld	W	D	L	GF	GA	GD	Pts	Promotion or relegation
1	Ashford Town	40	31	6	3	123	37	+86	102 (Note: Ashford Town were awarded three points.)	Promoted to the Isthmian League Division Three
2	Ash United	40	31	6	3	132	50	+82	99	
3	Bedfont	40	23	8	9	100	55	+45	77	
4	Chipstead	40	21	10	9	88	49	+39	73	
5	Walton Casuals	40	20	10	10	80	64	+16	73 (Note: Walton Casuals were awarded three points.)	
6	AFC Wallingford	40	20	11	9	77	50	+27	71	
7	Godalming & Guildford	40	18	7	15	89	69	+20	61	
8	Cove	40	17	9	14	68	61	+7	60	
9	Westfield	40	15	13	12	60	49	+11	58	
10	Farnham Town	40	15	10	15	51	60	−9	55	
11	Cobham	40	15	8	17	73	66	+7	53	
12	Reading Town	40	14	10	16	64	74	−10	52	
13	Merstham	40	14	10	16	76	95	−19	52	
14	Chessington & Hook United	40	11	13	16	57	66	−9	46	
15	Feltham	40	13	4	23	54	83	−29	43	
16	Raynes Park Vale	40	13	4	23	59	90	−31	43	
17	Sandhurst Town	40	9	9	22	71	96	−25	36	
18	Viking Greenford	40	11	6	23	55	103	−48	36 (Note: Viking Greenford were deducted three points.)	
19	Chessington United	40	9	9	22	45	92	−47	33 (Note: Chessington United were deducted three points.)	
20	Hartley Wintney	40	7	10	23	59	95	−36	31	
21	Cranleigh	40	4	5	31	37	114	−77	17	

Source: nonleaguematters
Rules for classification: 1) points; 2) goal difference; 3) number of goals scored.
