= Sandhurst Town F.C. =

English association football team in Sandhurst, Berkshire, England

Coordinates: 51°20′32″N 0°47′36″W

Sandhurst Town
- Full name: Sandhurst Town Football Club
- Nickname: The Fizzers
- Founded: 1910
- Ground: Bottom Meadow, Sandhurst
- Capacity: 1,950 (250 seated)
- Manager: Carl Barrie
- League: Wessex League - Division 1
- 2025–26: Combined Counties League Division One, 20th of 23 (transferred)
Home colours	Away colours

Sandhurst Town Football Club is a semi-professional football club based in Sandhurst, Berkshire, England. Formed in 1910, the club plays at Bottom Meadow and compete in Wessex League Division One.

== History ==
After the club's formation in 1910, Sandhurst played in the Reading & District League consistently up to 1979 other than a short spell in the East Berkshire Football League. In 1979, the club was then elected into the Aldershot & District League in which they finished in third place in their first season. In 1984 Sandhurst Town F.C. finished as runners-up from whence whey became founder members of the Chiltonian League and a stepping stone toward becoming a senior club. Their most successful season in the Chiltonian Football League was in 1986–87 when they finished in second place. In 1990, the club applied for membership of the Combined Counties League and were accepted after being granted senior status by the Berks & Bucks County FA. The first two seasons were poor as they finished in bottom place on each occasion and avoided relegation back to the Chiltonian Football League at the end of the second season only due to the vacancy created by the departure of Steyning Town to the Sussex County League. However, the form of the club improved thereafter with appointment as player-manager of Tony O'Connor, who brought an improvement in the quality and stature of the team. During his second season of management, the club reached the final of the Berks & Bucks Senior Trophy, where they lost 1–0 to Eton Wick, and the final of the League Challenge Vase, losing 2–1 to Bedfont. In 1996, Tony O'Connor gave up his position as manager, although he remained at the club as a player.

The club were first accepted for entry in to the FA Cup in 1998–99, with their best run in the competition to date being reaching the second round qualifying in 2004–05. In the FA Vase, their most successful season was also 2004–05, when they reached the third round (last 64) before losing.

Upon finishing 7th in the 2010–11 league season, the Fizzers went on to beat Wembley F.C. 1–0 at Farnborough Town Football Stadium on 6 May 2011 in the EL Records Premier Challenge Cup. This was the first time Sandhurst had won this honour and did so without conceding a single goal throughout the tournament.

The 2022–23 season saw Sandhurst hit the national headlines as they were forced to play 10 games in 13 days following a wet winter which had seen many games postponed, and the FA insisting that all leagues were to be completed by the end of April. Winning eight out of the ten games enabled them to clinch the Combined Counties League Division One title.

Under subsequent management changes, the club was relegated back to Step 6 at the conclusion of the 2024–25 season.

For the 2026–27 season, staying at Step 6 the club was laterally moved by the Football Association from the Combined Counties League to Division One of the Wessex League. Carl Barrie was appointed first-team manager ahead of the campaign.

== Stadium ==
The first ground used by the club was a field adjacent to the Bull & Butcher Public House, which was used as the club headquarters. After a few years, a move was made to the Memorial Park where the club remained until the 1996 close season apart from a couple of seasons during the 1950s spent on a nearby pitch in St John's Road. The introduction of the National Lottery prompted an immediate bid for funding to build a new ground in Bottom Meadow adjacent to the Memorial Park. With support and backing through additional match funding from Bracknell Forest Borough Council and Sandhurst Town Council, the club were successful in the first round of allocation ever made by the National Lotteries Charities Board.

The new facilities opened in August 1997 at a cost of £265,000. The ground is totally enclosed with perimeter fence and contains a boardroom/changing rooms complex, floodlights, covered accommodation, hardstanding and a post and rail barrier around the pitch. The new pitch was laid some eighteen months previously, following guidance from the national Sports Turf Council, but did not stage its first match until the start of the 1997–98 season. The ground and facilities at Bottom Meadow have been designed to meet the highest grading level of the Isthmian League to enable the club to make further progress in the football pyramid structure when circumstances permit. How far this progression has reached can be determined by the inclusion of the Club into the FA Cup for season 1998–99. The attendance record at the ground was set on 17 August 2002, when 2,449 watched Sandhurst Town's league match against AFC Wimbledon.

In 2005 a small all-seater covered stand was incorporated into the ground. This consists of 108 seats, in the red and black colours of the club.

In 2019 a proposal was tabled to replace the existing pitch, which had suffered drainage issues for a number of years, with a 3G pitch. This, among other improvements, was ultimately completed in May 2023. Shortly before this, in 2022, after a meeting between The SB Group and Sandhurst Town Council, permission was granted to allow Bracknell Town to groundshare with Sandhurst Town, the agreement running until the end of the 2037/38 season.

== Nickname ==
The club gives two explanations of its unusual nickname of 'The Fizzers', and it is unclear if the two are related. One explanation states that it derives from a Friendly Insurance Society (F.I.S.) set up in Sandhurst in 1933. The club alternatively state that the nickname originates from their supporters standing behind an opposing team's goal and shouting "Fizz Fizz Bang!" when the ball went into the net, although no explanation is given for why they would have done so.

== Season-by-season (since 1984) ==
Season	Division	League									FA Cup	FA Vase
Season	Division	P	W	D	L	GF	GA	GD	Pts	Pos	FA Cup	FA Vase
1984–85	Chiltonian League (Note: Sandhurst Town were founding members of Chiltonian League.)	32	17	8	7	73	42	+31	59	4th		
1985–86	Chiltonian League Division One	18	5	3	10	31	34	−3	18	7th		
1986–87	Chiltonian League Division One	20	10	8	2	35	19	+16	38	2nd		
1987–88	Chiltonian League Premier Division (Note: Chiltonian League Division One was renamed to Chiltonian League Premier Division.)	28	14	4	10	58	42	+16	46	4th		
1988–89	Chiltonian League Premier Division	28	15	8	5	49	31	+18	53	4th		
1989–90	Chiltonian League Premier Division	28	9	3	16	37	46	−9	30	11th		
1990–91	Combined Counties League	32	1	8	23	22	90	−68	11	17th		
1991–92	Combined Counties League	36	6	2	28	34	109	−75	20	19th		
1992–93	Combined Counties League	36	14	11	11	48	52	−4	53	7th		
1993–94	Combined Counties League	40	17	9	14	65	63	+2	60	10th		1R
1994–95	Combined Counties League	34	12	8	14	58	61	−3	44	10th		EP
1995–96	Combined Counties League	42	18	7	17	77	89	−12	61	12th		2Q
1996–97	Combined Counties League	38	17	10	11	61	63	−2	61	8th		2Q
1997–98	Combined Counties League	38	16	7	15	67	64	+3	55	9th		2Q
1998–99	Combined Counties League	40	13	8	19	63	92	−29	47	15th	1Q	R1
1999–00	Combined Counties League	40	9	9	22	70	96	−26	36	17th	PR	1Q
2000–01	Combined Counties League	39	17	6	16	75	61	+14	57	13th (Note: Three points deducted after a match against Farnham Town was not played.)	PR	2Q
2001–02	Combined Counties League	42	16	6	20	73	74	−1	54	13th	PR	R2
2002–03	Combined Counties League	46	23	9	14	86	57	+29	78	6th	PR	R2
2003–04	Combined Counties League Premier Division	46	27	11	8	109	60	+49	92	5th	1Q	2Q
2004–05	Combined Counties League Premier Division	46	26	10	10	106	61	+45	88	5th	2Q	R3 (Note: Sandhurst were knocked out 3–0 away to AFC Newbury after a previous attempt at the tie was abandoned due to fog in the 73rd minute, Sandhurst were leading 3–2 at the time.)
2005–06	Combined Counties League Premier Division	40	18	12	10	77	50	+27	66	7th	EP	2Q
2006–07	Combined Counties League Premier Division	42	15	10	17	61	67	−6	55	12th	PR	R1
2007–08	Combined Counties League Premier Division	42	14	9	19	63	89	−26	51	16th	1Q	R1
2008–09	Combined Counties League Premier Division	42	14	9	19	63	82	−19	51	16th	EP	R2
2009–10	Combined Counties League Premier Division	42	20	8	14	80	67	+13	68	9th	EP	1Q
2010–11	Combined Counties League Premier Division	40	20	8	12	77	58	+19	68	7th	EP	2Q
2011–12	Combined Counties League Premier Division	42	15	3	24	64	106	−42	48	15th	EP	1Q
2012–13	Combined Counties League Premier Division	42	13	2	27	68	103	−35	41	21st	EP	R1
2013–14	Combined Counties League Division One	30	8	3	19	47	90	−43	27	13th	EP	1Q
2014–15	Combined Counties League Division One	30	7	1	22	46	96	−50	22	16th (Note: Three points deducted.)		
2015–16	Combined Counties League Division One	32	9	8	15	57	89	−32	35	11th		
2016–17	Hellenic Football League Division One East	26	10	7	9	38	41	−3	37	8th		1Q
2017–18	Hellenic Football League Division One East	24	14	3	7	66	37	+29	45	4th		R1
2018–19	Combined Counties League Division One	34	18	6	10	61	54	+7	60	6th	EP	1Q
2019–20	Combined Counties League Division One	25	12	8	5	56	39	+17	44	N/A (Note: Both seasons were abandoned part way due to COVID-19)		1Q
2020–21	Combined Counties League Division One	11	4	0	7	10	26	−16	12	N/A	EP	R1
2021–22	Combined Counties League Division One	40	21	6	13	87	54	+33	69	8th		2Q
2022–23	Combined Counties League Division One	40	28	3	9	128	53	+75	87	1st		1Q
2023–24	Combined Counties League Premier Division	38	16	5	17	73	78	−5	53	10th	EP	1Q
2024–25	Combined Counties League Premier Division	38	9	6	23	65	97	−32	33	19th	PR	2Q
2025–26	Combined Counties League Division One	44	10	6	28	58	107	-49	36	20th		2Q

=== Key ===
Winners	Runners-up	Third place	Play-offs	Promoted	Relegated

== Honours ==
=== League ===
- Combined Counties League Division One
  - Champions: 2022–23
- Reading & District League Premier Division
  - Champions: 1933–1934
- Reading & District League Division One
  - Champions: 1932–193
- Aldershot & District League Division One
  - Champions: 1980–1981
- Chiltonian League Division One
  - Runners-up: 1986–1987

=== Cup ===
- EL Records Premier Challenge Cup
  - Winners: 2010–11
- Yateley & District Hospital Cup
  - Winners: 1925–1926, 1926–1927, 1971–1972, 1983–1984
- Aldershot FA Senior Cup
  - Winners: 2000–2001, 2005–06
- Southern Combination Cup
  - Winners: 2002–2003
- Aldershot & District League Division One Cup
  - Winners: 1980–1981
- Aldershot & District League Eric Perrin Silver Plate
  - Winners: 1997–1998
- Ascot & District Charity Cup
  - Winners: 1933–1934, 1986–1987, 1987–1988
- Fripp-Smith Trophy (Note: A small cup competition organised by the Combined Counties League in memory of two board members of the league who died.)
  - Winners: 2021

== Records ==
- Bottom Meadow Ground attendance record
  - 2,449 v AFC Wimbledon 17 August 2002
- Biggest victory
  - 9–1 v Cranleigh 8 January 2000
- Heaviest defeat
  - 0–8 v Cobham 26 October 1991
- Best FA Cup run
  - 2004–05 2nd qualifying round v Leatherhead Lost 2–0
- Best FA Vase run
  - 2004–05 3rd round proper v AFC Newbury Lost 3–0
