= 1993–94 South Midlands League =

The 1993–94 South Midlands League season was 65th in the history of South Midlands League.

At the end of the previous season the league was reorganized from 2 divisions (Premier, One), to 3 divisions (Premier, Senior, One).

== Premier Division ==
South Midlands League Premier Division
- Season: 1993–94
- Champions: Bedford Town
- Promoted: Bedford Town
- Relegated: None

The Premier Division featured 15 clubs which competed in the division last season, along with 1 new club:

- Bedford Town, promoted from the old Division One.

=== League table ===
Pos	Team	Pld	W	D	L	GF	GA	GD	Pts	Qualification
1	Bedford Town (C, P)	30	22	5	3	94	26	+68	71	Promotion to Isthmian League Division Three
2	Luton Old Boys	30	19	2	9	61	47	+14	59	Left the league
3	Biggleswade Town	30	16	5	9	48	36	+12	53	
4	Welwyn Garden City	30	14	5	11	43	44	−1	47	
5	Brache Sparta	30	13	7	10	47	36	+11	46	
6	Arlesey Town	30	12	8	10	54	49	+5	44	
7	Wingate & Finchley	30	13	5	12	45	44	+1	44	
8	Hoddesdon Town	30	11	10	9	42	33	+9	43	
9	Langford	30	12	7	11	54	50	+4	43	
10	Harpenden Town	30	13	4	13	57	54	+3	43	
11	Hatfield Town	30	11	7	12	38	38	0	40	
12	Shillington	30	10	5	15	42	47	−5	35	
13	Buckingham Athletic	30	9	2	19	51	76	−25	29	
14	Potters Bar Town	30	7	7	16	35	60	−25	28	
15	Letchworth Garden City	30	8	4	18	39	75	−36	28	
16	Milton Keynes Borough	30	5	7	18	31	66	−35	22	

Source: nonleaguematters
Rules for classification: 1) points; 2) goal difference; 3) number of goals scored.
(C) Champions; (P) Promoted

== Senior Division ==
South Midlands League Senior Division
- Season: 1993–94
- Champions: Toddington Rovers
- Promoted: None
- Relegated: None

The Senior Division featured 14 clubs, joined from the Premier Division and the old Division One.

- 5 Clubs joined from the Premier Division:
  - Leverstock Green
  - Totternhoe
  - Pitstone & Ivinghoe
  - The 61 FC Luton
  - New Bradwell St. Peter
- 9 Clubs joined from the old Division One:
  - London Colney
  - Bedford United
  - Risborough Rangers
  - Shenley & Loughton
  - Toddington Rovers
  - Winslow United
  - Tring Athletic
  - Shefford Town
  - Ampthill Town

=== League table ===
Pos	Team	Pld	W	D	L	GF	GA	GD	Pts	Qualification
1	Toddington Rovers (C)	26	21	4	1	78	25	+53	67	
2	London Colney	26	18	4	4	82	28	+54	58	
3	Totternhoe	26	15	5	6	66	39	+27	50	
4	Shenley & Loughton	26	13	5	8	38	31	+7	44	Left the league
5	Shefford Town	26	11	8	7	50	38	+12	41	Left the league
6	Risborough Rangers	26	12	5	9	49	40	+9	41	
7	Winslow United	26	12	4	10	55	58	−3	40	
8	Leverstock Green	26	11	4	11	41	34	+7	37	
9	Ampthill Town	26	9	4	13	38	47	−9	31	
10	Tring Athletic	26	8	6	12	37	47	−10	30	
11	Bedford United	26	6	6	14	47	67	−20	24	
12	The 61 FC Luton	26	6	5	15	35	56	−21	23	
13	New Bradwell St. Peter	26	4	2	20	20	63	−43	14	
14	Pitstone & Ivinghoe	26	3	4	19	25	88	−63	10 (Note: Pitstone & Ivinghoe deducted 3 points.)	

Source: nonleaguematters
Rules for classification: 1) points; 2) goal difference; 3) number of goals scored.
(C) Champions

== Division One ==
South Midlands League Division One
- Season: 1993–94
- Champions: Stony Stratford Town
- Promoted: Stony Stratford Town; Delco
- Relegated: None

The Division One featured 16 clubs.

- 11 Clubs joined from the old Division One:
  - Potters Bar Crusaders
  - Caddington
  - Ashcroft
  - Stony Stratford Town
  - Delco
  - Sandy Albion
  - Cranfield United
  - Emberton
  - Flamstead
  - De Havilland
  - Walden Rangers
- 5 Clubs joined the league:
  - Houghton Town
  - Scot
  - Eaton Bray
  - Mercedes Benz
  - Milton Keynes County

=== League table ===
Pos	Team	Pld	W	D	L	GF	GA	GD	Pts	Qualification
1	Stony Stratford Town (C, P)	30	23	5	2	108	34	+74	74	Promotion to Senior Division
2	Delco (P)	30	20	3	7	68	40	+28	63	Promotion to Senior Division
3	Houghton Town	30	20	2	8	67	38	+29	62	
4	Flamstead	30	17	2	11	63	47	+16	53	
5	Walden Rangers	30	15	6	9	69	45	+24	51	
6	De Havilland	30	15	4	11	65	65	0	49	
7	Ashcroft	30	14	6	10	54	48	+6	48	Left the league
8	Cranfield United	30	13	3	14	66	58	+8	42	
9	Scot	30	12	5	13	57	63	−6	41	
10	Eaton Bray	30	11	6	13	53	56	−3	39	
11	Caddington	30	11	6	13	39	57	−18	39	
12	Potters Bar Crusaders	30	11	3	16	76	72	+4	36	Left the league
13	Emberton	30	11	3	16	53	69	−16	36	
14	Mercedes Benz	30	7	7	16	40	62	−22	28	
15	Milton Keynes County	30	5	2	23	30	75	−45	17	Left the league
16	Sandy Albion	30	3	1	26	29	108	−79	10	Left the league

Source: nonleaguematters
Rules for classification: 1) points; 2) goal difference; 3) number of goals scored.
(C) Champions; (P) Promoted
