= 1993–94 Essex Senior Football League =

The 1993–94 season was the 23rd in the history of Essex Senior Football League a football competition in England.

The league featured 16 clubs which competed in the league last season, no new clubs joined the league this season.

Basildon United were champions, winning their fifth Essex Senior League title, while Canvey Island were promoted to the Isthmian League.

== League table ==
Essex Senior Football League
- Season: 1993–94
- Champions: Basildon United
- Promoted: Canvey Island
- Matches: 240
- Goals: 737 (3.07 per match)

Pos	Team	Pld	W	D	L	GF	GA	GD	Pts	Promotion or relegation
1	Basildon United	30	21	7	2	64	18	+46	70	
2	Ford United	30	20	6	4	64	16	+48	66	
3	Canvey Island	30	19	5	6	50	22	+28	62	Promoted to the Isthmian League
4	Romford	30	16	6	8	52	37	+15	54	
5	Great Wakering Rovers	30	16	5	9	69	40	+29	53	
6	Bowers United	30	14	6	10	40	44	−4	48	
7	Brentwood	30	13	6	11	49	43	+6	45	
8	Sawbridgeworth Town	30	13	6	11	46	40	+6	45	
9	Concord Rangers	30	11	7	12	50	41	+9	40	
10	East Ham United	30	10	8	12	46	54	−8	38	
11	Maldon Town	30	11	3	16	38	46	−8	36	
12	Eton Manor	30	8	2	20	37	74	−37	26	
13	Southend Manor	30	6	7	17	42	65	−23	25	
14	Burnham Ramblers	30	7	4	19	32	55	−23	25	
15	Hullbridge Sports	30	5	7	18	30	74	−44	22	
16	Stansted	30	4	7	19	28	68	−40	19	

Source: fchd
Rules for classification: 1) points; 2) goal difference; 3) number of goals scored.
