= 1992–93 South Midlands League =

The 1992–93 South Midlands League season was 64th in the history of South Midlands League.

At the end of the season the league was reorganized from 2 divisions (Premier, One), to 3 divisions (Premier, Senior, One).

== Premier Division ==
South Midlands League Premier Division
- Season: 1992–93
- Champions: Oxford City
- Promoted: Oxford City
- Relegated: 5 clubs to Senior Division

The Premier Division featured 19 clubs which competed in the division last season, along with 3 new clubs:

- Luton Old Boys, promoted from Division One.
- Arlesey Town, transferred from the United Counties League Premier Division
- Hatfield Town, joined from Herts Senior County League Premier Division as Hatfield Town Athletic

=== League table ===
Pos	Team	Pld	W	D	L	GF	GA	GD	Pts	Qualification
1	Oxford City (C, P)	42	34	4	4	141	44	+97	106	Promotion to Isthmian League Division Three
2	Brache Sparta	42	29	7	6	97	41	+56	94	
3	Arlesey Town	42	26	9	7	99	40	+59	87	
4	Wingate & Finchley	42	23	11	8	84	54	+30	80	
5	Hatfield Town	42	21	11	10	114	71	+43	74	
6	Hoddesdon Town	42	21	11	10	80	48	+32	71 (Note: Hoddesdon Town deducted 3 points.)	
7	Biggleswade Town	42	19	9	14	86	58	+28	66	
8	Shillington	42	19	9	14	63	58	+5	66	
9	Leverstock Green (R)	42	19	7	16	62	62	0	64	Relegation to Senior Division
10	Harpenden Town	42	18	9	15	67	47	+20	63	
11	Letchworth Garden City	42	18	8	16	79	63	+16	62	
12	Milton Keynes Borough	42	18	8	16	77	65	+12	61 (Note: Milton Keynes Borough deducted 1 point.)	
13	Potters Bar Town	42	17	9	16	81	82	−1	60	
14	Langford	42	14	13	15	75	63	+12	55	
15	Totternhoe (R)	42	13	13	16	56	67	−11	52	Relegation to Senior Division
16	Luton Old Boys	42	15	7	20	57	75	−18	49 (Note: Luton Old Boys deducted 3 points.)	
17	Buckingham Athletic	42	11	8	23	73	103	−30	41	
18	Pitstone & Ivinghoe (R)	42	11	5	26	50	99	−49	38	Relegation to Senior Division
19	Welwyn Garden City	42	9	10	23	47	88	−41	37	
20	The 61 FC Luton (R)	42	9	5	28	54	120	−66	32	Relegation to Senior Division
21	Pirton	42	4	8	30	32	115	−83	20	Left the league
22	New Bradwell St. Peter (R)	42	0	7	35	20	131	−111	7	Relegation to Senior Division

Source: nonleaguematters
Rules for classification: 1) points; 2) goal difference; 3) number of goals scored.
(C) Champions; (P) Promoted; (R) Relegated

== Division One ==
South Midlands League Division One
- Season: 1992–93
- Champions: Bedford Town
- Promoted: Bedford Town
- Relegated: 11 clubs to new Division One

The Division One featured 19 clubs which competed in the division last season, along with 3 new clubs:

- Winslow United, relegated from Premier Division.
- De Havilland, joined from Herts Senior County League Division Two
- London Colney, joined from Herts Senior County League Premier Division

=== League table ===
Pos	Team	Pld	W	D	L	GF	GA	GD	Pts	Qualification
1	Bedford Town (C, P)	42	36	4	2	163	40	+123	112	Promotion to Premier Division
2	London Colney	42	32	3	7	127	36	+91	99	
3	Bedford United	42	26	7	9	114	64	+50	85	
4	Risborough Rangers	42	25	9	8	86	55	+31	84	
5	Shenley & Loughton	42	24	10	8	98	56	+42	82	
6	Toddington Rovers	42	24	8	10	102	56	+46	80	
7	Winslow United	42	21	8	13	117	62	+55	71	
8	Potters Bar Crusaders (R)	42	23	2	17	106	87	+19	71	Relegation to new Division One
9	Caddington (R)	42	22	3	17	88	78	+10	69	Relegation to new Division One
10	Tring Athletic	42	18	12	12	83	72	+11	66	
11	Shefford Town	42	18	9	15	76	51	+25	60 (Note: Shefford Town deducted 3 points.)	
12	Ashcroft (R)	42	17	9	16	80	79	+1	60	Relegation to new Division One
13	Ampthill Town	42	17	7	18	76	74	+2	58	
14	Stony Stratford Town (R)	42	16	4	22	85	97	−12	52	Relegation to new Division One
15	Delco (R)	42	12	5	25	63	103	−40	41	Relegation to new Division One
16	Sandy Albion (R)	42	10	10	22	62	108	−46	40	Relegation to new Division One
17	Cranfield United (R)	42	9	11	22	59	94	−35	38	Relegation to new Division One
18	Emberton (R)	42	8	8	26	51	117	−66	32	Relegation to new Division One
19	Flamstead (R)	42	7	10	25	55	124	−69	31	Relegation to new Division One
20	De Havilland (R)	42	7	10	25	57	111	−54	28 (Note: De Havilland deducted 3 points.)	Relegation to new Division One
21	Walden Rangers (R)	42	7	4	31	44	129	−85	25	Relegation to new Division One
22	Ickleford	42	4	5	33	46	145	−99	17	Left the league

Source: nonleaguematters
Rules for classification: 1) points; 2) goal difference; 3) number of goals scored.
(C) Champions; (P) Promoted; (R) Relegated
