= Aveley F.C. =

English football club

Coordinates: 51.5035°N 0.2613°E

Aveley
- Full name: Aveley Football Club
- Nickname: The Millers
- Founded: 1927
- Ground: Parkside, Aveley
- Capacity: 3,500 (424 seated)
- Chairman: Craig Johnson
- Manager: Alex Akrofi
- League: Isthmian League Premier Division
- 2025–26: Isthmian League Premier Division, 2nd of 22
Home colours	Away colours

Aveley Football Club are a professional football club based in Aveley, Essex, England. They are currently members of the Isthmian League Premier Division and play at Parkside.

== History ==
The club was established in 1927 and played in local leagues until World War II. In 1946 they joined the Thurrock Combination League, and went on to win the Essex Junior Cup in 1947–48 and 1948–49. In 1949 the club joined Division Two of the London League. They finished fourth in their first season, and were promoted to Division One. The following season they won Division One, but were not promoted to the Premier Division. However, despite finishing ninth in 1952–53, they were promoted. The following season saw them win the League Cup. They won the Premier Division title in 1954–55. In 1957 the club switched to the Delphian League, finishing as runners-up in their first season and winning the League Cup in 1961–62. When the league folded in 1963 they joined Division Two of the Athenian League. After finishing second in 1968–69, the club was promoted to Division One. They won the Division One title in 1970–71, earning promotion to the Premier Division.

In 1973 Aveley joined Division Two of the Isthmian League, which became Division One in 1977. They won the Essex Thameside Trophy in 1979–80 and the Hornchurch Charity Cup in 1982–83. In 1985–86 they finished bottom of the division, and were relegated to Division Two North. They won the East Anglian Cup in 1988–89, and after finishing second in 1989–90, a season in which they also became the first club from the bottom division to win the League Cup, the club was promoted back to Division One. Although they finished fourth in their first season back in Division One, the club finished bottom of the division the following season, but were not relegated. However, in 1992–93 they finished bottom again and were relegated to Division Two. In 1994–95 the club were relegated to Division Three, where they remained until 2002, when league reorganisation saw them placed in Division One North.

Aveley were transferred to Division One East of the Southern League in 2004, before returning to Division One North of the Isthmian League in 2006. They won the division in 2008–09, and were promoted to the Premier Division. After finishing third in Isthmian League under manager Rod Stringer, the club lost in the promotion play-off semi-finals to eventual winners Boreham Wood. In 2011–12 the club were relegated back to Division One North after finishing third-from-bottom. In their first season in Division One they finished fifth and qualified for the promotion play-offs. They lost 3–1 to Maldon & Tiptree in the semi-finals.

During the 2019–20 season, the club reached the quarter-finals of the FA Trophy, eventually exiting the competition after a 5–0 loss away to Notts County. In 2021–22 Aveley were Division One North champions and were promoted to the Premier Division. The following season saw the club win the League Cup, defeating Potters Bar Town 3–0 in the final. They went on to finish fourth in the league, and after beating Canvey Island in the play-off semi-finals, defeated Hornchurch 1–0 in the final to earn a second consecutive promotion, this time to the National League South. They finished seventh in the National League South in their first season in the division, before losing 2–1 to Maidstone United in the play-off quarter-finals.

In 2024–25 Aveley finished bottom of the National League South and were relegated back to the Premier Division of the Isthmian League. In their first season back in the Isthmian League Premier Division they were runners-up in the division, going on to lose losing 4–1 to Brentwood Town in the play-off semi-finals.

== Ground ==
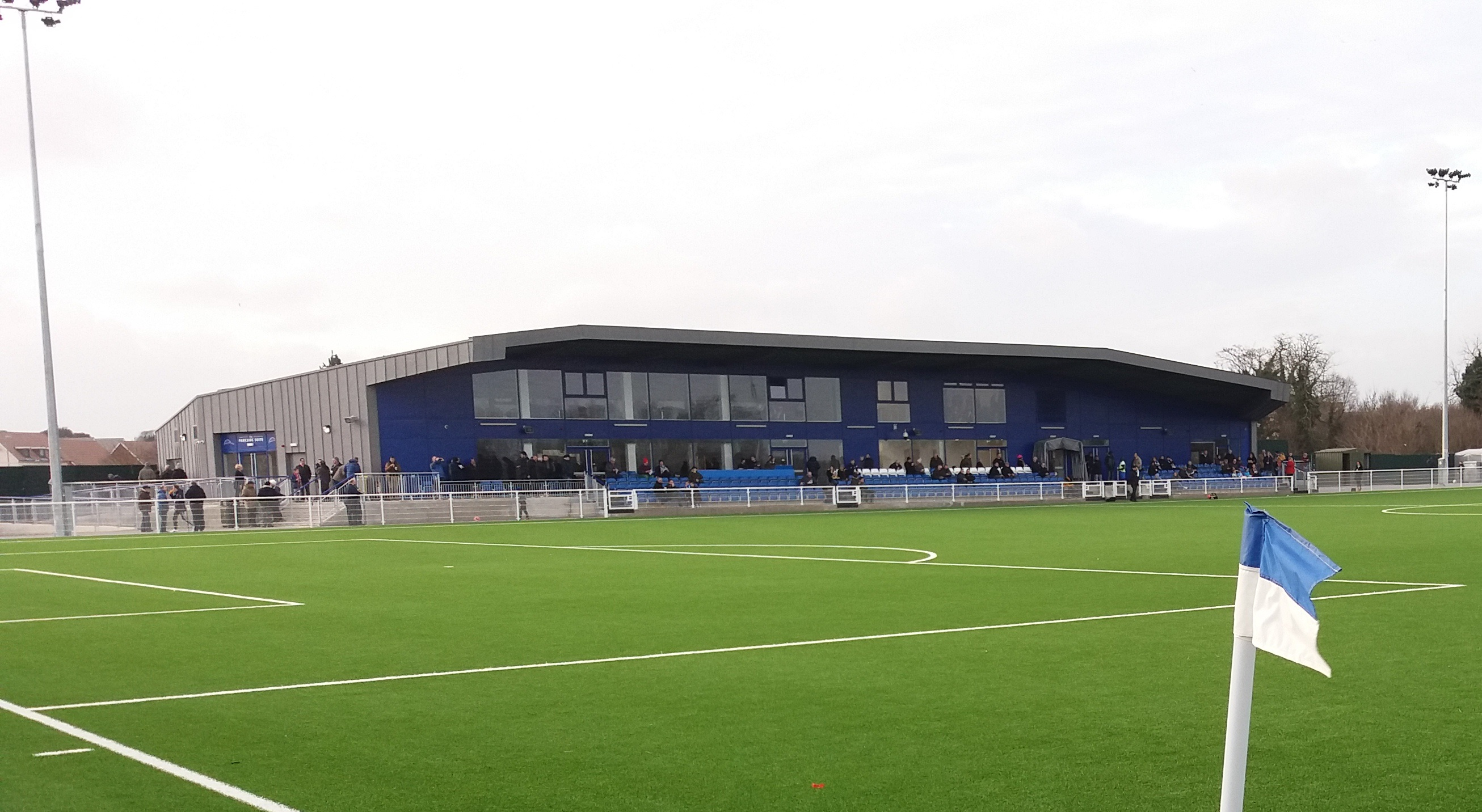
The main stand at Parkside

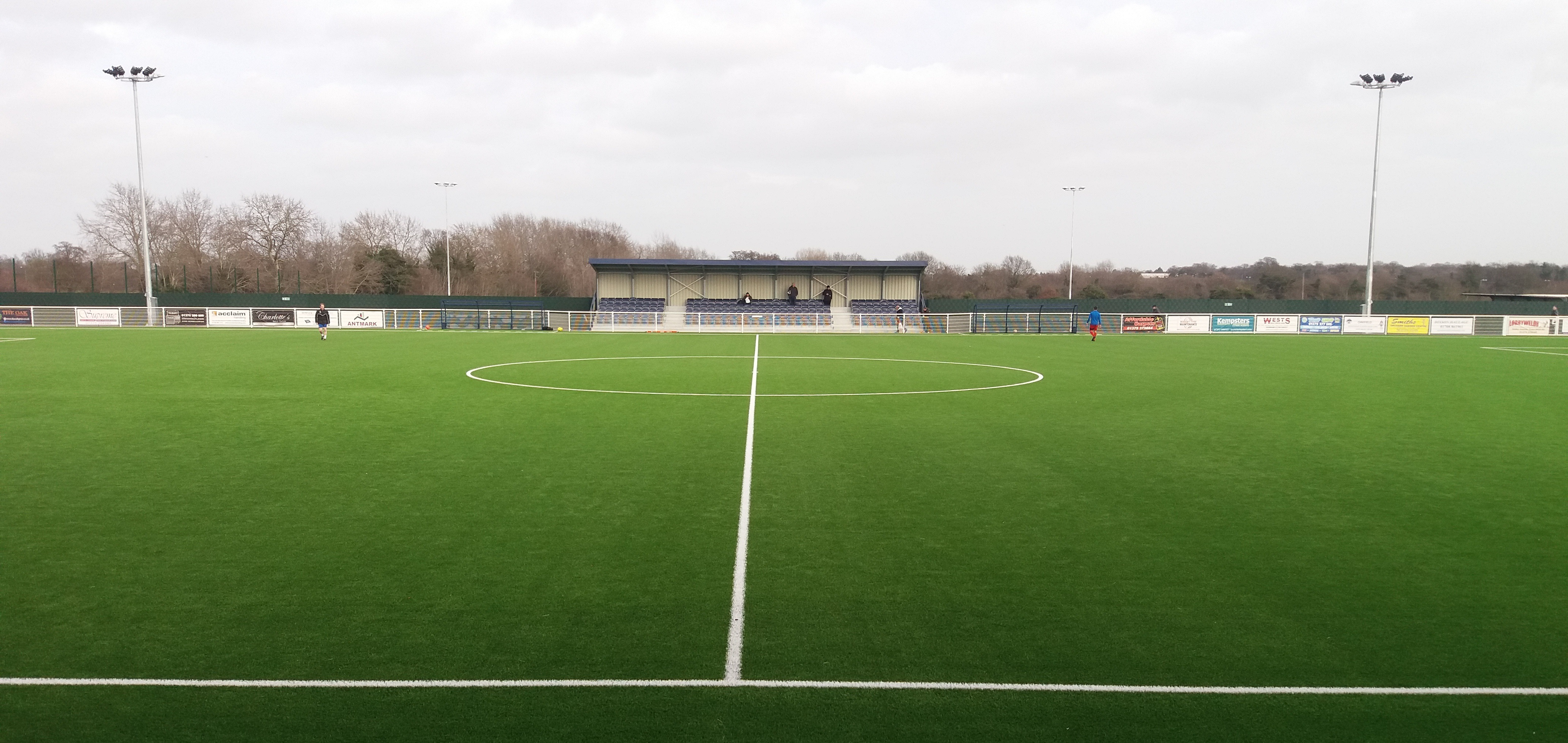
The second seated stand at Parkside

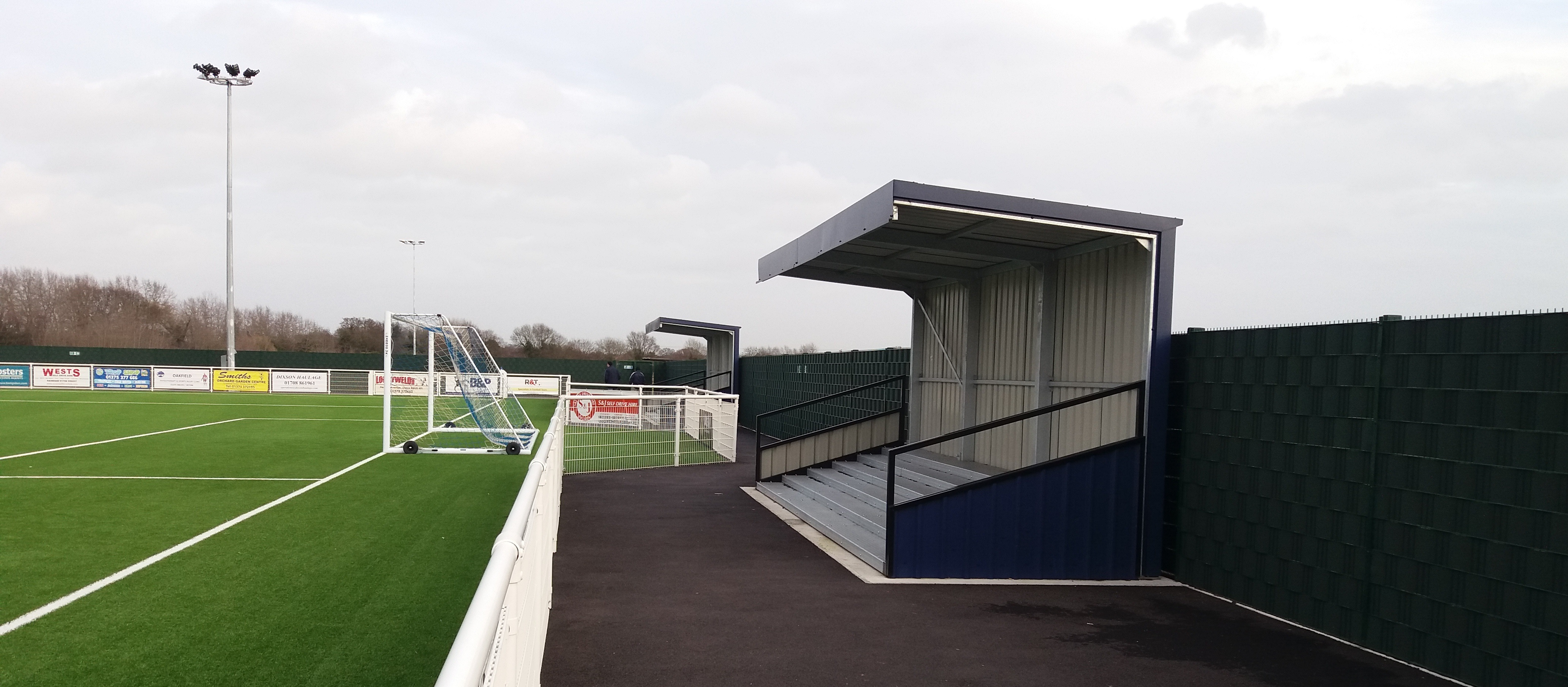
Standing areas behind one goal

The club played at Lodge Meadow until moving to Mill Field in 1952, at which point they gained the nickname the Millers. The new ground was built by supporters on land they had purchased, and a stand was bought from Grays Athletic for £100, subsequently becoming known as the Pepper Stand. The ground was opened with a local derby match against Grays. Terracing was installed on the other side of the ground, on which a 400-seat wooden stand was erected in 1958 at a cost of £2,600, together with additional terracing. Floodlights were installed in 1967, with Grays again the visitors for the first match played under them. At the time of its closure, the ground had a capacity of 4,000, of which 400 was seated and covered.

During the 2010s the club bought the site of a former gravel pit from Thurrock Council using money raised from selling Mill Field to developers. The 2016–17 season was the club's last at Mill Field, as they moved to Parkside Stadium for the start of the 2017–18 season. The new ground featured two seated stands on either side of the pitch, one of which was built into the clubhouse, with the clubhouse roof overhang providing cover. Two covered terraces were erected behind each goal, either side of the goalmouth, whilst an artificial pitch was installed. In 2018 Parkside hosted a number of games in the CONIFA World Cup. The ground has also been shared by Grays Athletic (2017–2023), May & Baker (2019–2024), Cannons Wood (since 2023), Hashtag United Women (since 2023) and Hashtag United (since 2024).

== Honours ==
- Isthmian League
  - Division One North champions 2008–09, 2021–22
  - League Cup winners 1989–90, 2022–23
- Athenian League
  - Champions 1970–71
- Delphian League
  - League Cup winners 1961–62
- London League
  - Premier Division champions 1954–55
  - Division One champions 1950–51
  - League Cup winners 1953–54
- East Anglian Cup
  - Winners 1988–89
- Essex Junior Cup
  - Winners 1948–48, 1948–49
- Essex Thames-Side Challenge Trophy
  - Winners 1979–80, 2004–05, 2006–07

== Records ==
- Best FA Cup performance: First round, 1970–71
- Best FA Trophy performance: Quarter-finals, 2019–20
- Best FA Vase performance: Fourth round, 1995–96
- Biggest win: 11–1 vs Histon, 24 August 1963
- Heaviest defeat: 8–0 vs Orient, Essex Thames-Side Trophy
- Record attendance: 3,741 vs Slough Town, 27 February 1971
- Most appearances: Ken Riley, 422
- Record goalscorer: Jotty Wilks, 214

== See also ==
- Aveley F.C. players
- Aveley F.C. managers
