= Bracknell Town F.C. =

Association football club in England

Coordinates: 51°20′32″N 0°47′36″W

Bracknell Town
- Full name: Bracknell Town Football Club
- Nickname: The Robins
- Founded: 1896
- Ground: Bottom Meadow, Sandhurst
- Capacity: 1,950
- Chairman: Dan Harris
- Manager: Carl Davies
- League: Southern League Premier Division South
- 2025–26: Southern League Premier Division South, 12th of 22
- Website: bracknelltownfc.com
Home colours	Away colours

Bracknell Town Football Club is a football club based in Sandhurst, Berkshire, England. Affiliated to the Berks & Bucks Football Association and nicknamed The Robins, they are currently members of the Southern League Premier Division South and play their home matches at Bottom Meadow in Sandhurst.

== History ==
The club was established in 1896 as Old Bracknell Wanderers. They joined the Ascot & District League in 1904, and were runners-up in the league in 1907–08. The following season the club won the League Cup, and in 1911–12 they were league champions. Two seasons later they won Division Two. They were league champions again in 1932–33.

In 1949 the club switched to the Reading & District League and were renamed Bracknell Football Club. They remained in the league until joining the Great Western Combination in 1958. In 1962 the club adopted its current name, and a year later joined the Surrey Senior League. They finished bottom of the league in 1965–66, but went on to win the League Cup in 1968–69 and the double of the title and League Cup in 1969–70.

After winning the league, the club joined the Spartan League. They won the League Cup in 1974–75, and when the league merged with the Metropolitan–London League to become the London Spartan League at the end of the season, Bracknell were placed in Division One. They finished as runners-up in the new league's first season, losing the title to Farnborough Town on goal average, as well as losing the League Cup final. In 1977 Division One was renamed the Premier Division, and despite finishing fourth in 1978–79, the club were relegated to the Senior Division. They won the Senior Division in 1980–81, earning promotion back to the Premier Division, and the following season saw them finish as runners-up and win the League Cup. They went on to win the Premier Division and the League Cup in 1982–83.

After being rejected by the Athenian League, Bracknell joined Division Two South of the Isthmian League in 1984. They finished as runners-up in 1985–86 and were promoted to Division One. However, they were relegated back to Division Two South at the end of the 1988–89 season. League reorganisation saw them placed in Division Three in 1991, but after winning the division in 1993–94, they were promoted to Division Two, where they remained until relegation back to Division Three at the end of the 1988–89 season. In 2000–01 the club reached the first round of the FA Cup for the first time, eventually losing 4–0 at Lincoln City.

Further league reorganisation in 2002 saw Bracknell placed in Division One South, and two seasons later they were transferred to Division One West of the Southern League; this became Division One South and West in 2006. After finishing bottom of the division in 2009–10, they were relegated to the Premier Division of the Hellenic League. They were relegated again, this time to Division One East, at the end of the 2011–12 season after finishing bottom of the Premier Division. Despite finishing only fifth in Division One East the following season, the club was promoted back to the Premier Division. The 2016–17 season saw the club win three cups; the Hellenic League Challenge Cup was won by defeating Highworth Town 2–0 in the final; the Berks & Bucks County Senior Trophy was secured with a 2–0 win against Binfield, whilst the club beat Binfield again in the Reading Senior Cup final.

In 2017–18 Bracknell were runners-up in the Hellenic League Premier Division, earning promotion to the South Central Division of the Isthmian League, as well as retaining the Challenge Cup with a 3–1 win over Thatcham Town in the final. The following season saw them finish as runners-up in the Isthmian League's South Central Division, qualifying for the promotion play-offs. After beating Westfield 2–1 in the semi-finals, they lost 3–0 to Cheshunt in the final. In 2021–22 the club won the division, securing the championship by mid-March, earning promotion to the Premier Division South of the Southern League.

The 2022–23 season saw Bracknell qualify for the first round of the FA Cup for the second time, with the club losing 3–0 at home to Ipswich Town. They went on to finish as runners-up in the Premier Division South. In the subsequent play-offs, they defeated Chesham United 1–0 in the semi-finals before losing 3–2 to Truro City in the final. During the season they also won the Berks & Bucks Senior Cup for the first time, winning the final against Marlow 1–0. A fifth-place finish in the Premier Division South in 2023–24 led to another play-off campaign, but they were beaten 2–1 by AFC Totton in the semi-finals.

== Ground ==
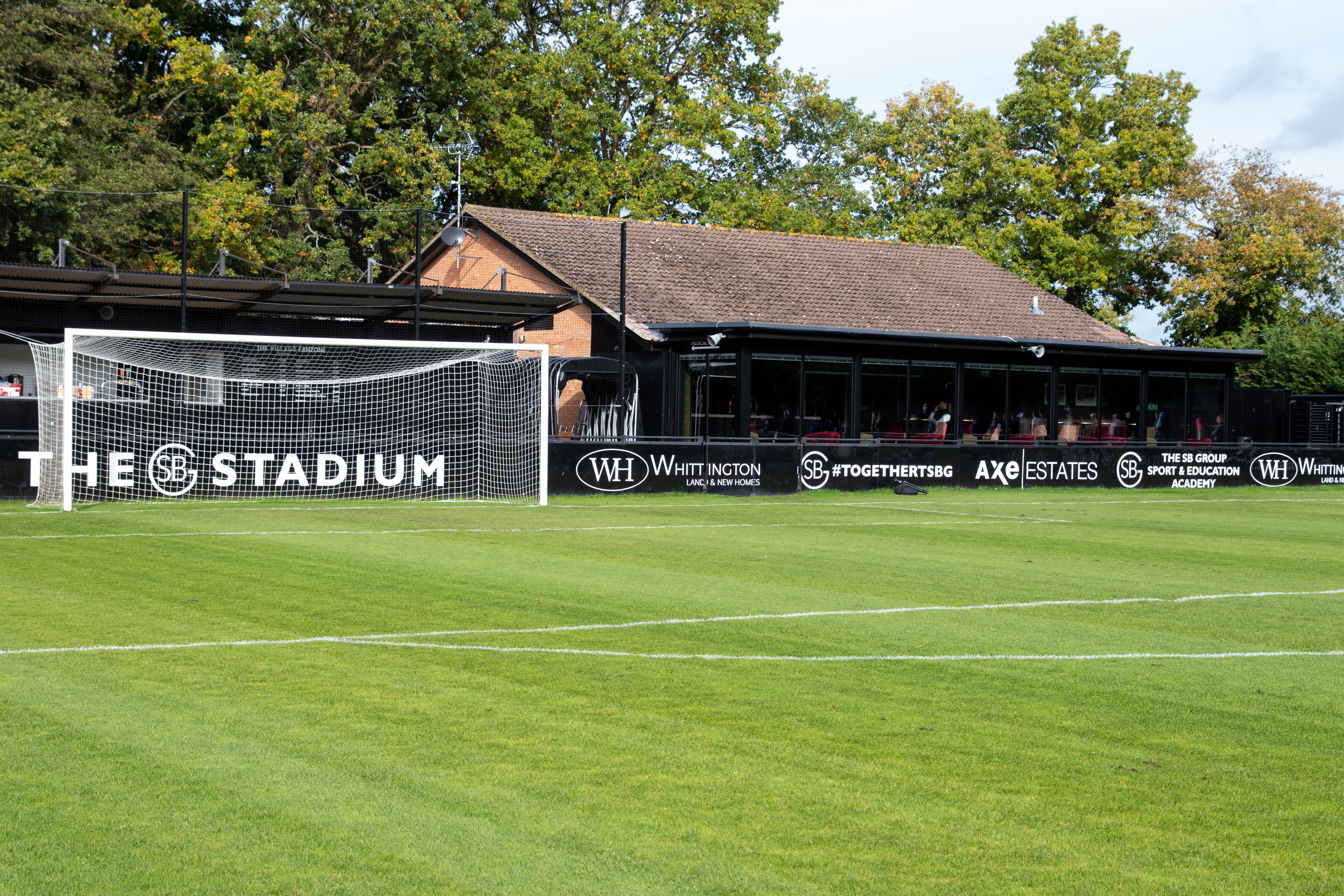
View of Club House at Bottom Meadow

The club originally played on a field near the Downshire Arms, before moving to Station Field, a site that later became Ranelagh School. In 1933 they moved to Larges Lane, where the pitch featured a significant slope for the first 20 years of use. After being left money by Raymond Brown, the club was able to build a new clubhouse, which was opened by Stanley Rous.

A seated stand was built behind the dugouts in 1988, with another seated stand and a covered terrace on same touchline. A covered terrace is located behind one goal. In 2016 a 3G pitch was installed and a new stand erected. In 2018, Larges Lane hosted a number of games in the CONIFA World Cup. However, the club moved to Sandhurst Town's Bottom Meadow ground at the end of the 2020–21 season after the ground was turned into a residential development.

== Current squad ==
As of 16 November 2026

Note: Flags indicate national team as defined under FIFA eligibility rules; some limited exceptions apply. Players may hold more than one non-FIFA nationality.

No.	Pos.	Nation	Player
1	GK	ENG	Matt Kerbey (on loan from Havant & Waterlooville)
2	DF	ENG	Charlie Stallard
3	DF	ENG	Josh Brooking
4	DF	ENG	CJ Fearn
5	DF	ENG	James Taylor
7	FW	ENG	Bradley Wilson
8	MF	WAL	Ben Purcell
10	MF	ENG	Josh Boorn
11	FW	ENG	Great Evans
14	MF	ENG	Harry Thorpe
15	FW	ENG	Harley Platel (on loan from Farnham Town)
17	FW	ENG	Jamal Sharpe

No.	Pos.	Nation	Player
18	MF	ENG	Harry Hamblin
19	FW	NIR	Marcus Daws
20	DF	ENG	Kai Tanner (on loan from Farnham Town)
21	DF	ENG	Anthony Cheshire
22	MF	ENG	Jackson Blaize
23	DF	ENG	Josh McMenemy (on loan from Maidenhead United)
—	MF	ENG	Oliver Gofford
—	FW	ENG	Ethan Lindo

=== Out on loan ===
Note: Flags indicate national team as defined under FIFA eligibility rules; some limited exceptions apply. Players may hold more than one non-FIFA nationality.

No.	Pos.	Nation	Player

== Honours ==
- Isthmian League
  - South Central Division champions 2021–22
  - Division Three champions 1993–94
- Spartan League
  - Premier Division champions 1982–83
  - Senior Division champions 1980–81
  - League Cup winners 1974–75, 1981–82, 1982–83
- Hellenic League
  - Challenge Cup winners 2016–17, 2017–18
- Surrey Senior League
  - Champions 1969–70
  - League Cup winners 1968–69, 1969–70
- Ascot & District League
  - Champions 1911–12, 1932–33
  - Division Two champions 1913–14
  - League Cup winners 1908–09
- Berks & Bucks Senior Cup
  - Winners 2022–23, 2024–25
- Berks & Bucks County Senior Trophy
  - Winners 2016–17
- Reading Senior Cup
  - Winners 2016–17
- Stimulus Cup
  - Winners 1998–99
- Fielden Cup
  - Winners 1950–51, 1968–69, 1969–70, 1974–75, 1976–77, 1977–78, 1978–79, 1982–83

== Records ==
- Best FA Cup performance: First round, 2000–01, 2022–23, 2023–24
- Best FA Trophy performance: Fifth round, 2022–23
- Best FA Vase performance: Quarter-finals, 2017–18
- Record attendance: 2,500 v Newquay, FA Amateur Cup, 1971
- Most appearances: James Woodcock
- Most goals: Justin Day

== See also ==
- Bracknell Town F.C. players
- Bracknell Town F.C. managers
