= Coulsdon Town F.C. =

Greater London football club

Coordinates: 51°17′50.14″N 0°08′39.91″W

Coulsdon Town
- Full name: Coulsdon Town Football Club
- Nickname(s): The C's
- Founded: 1968
- Dissolved: 2014
- Ground: Netherne C.A.S.C., Coulsdon
- 2013–14: Surrey Elite Intermediate League, 16th of 16
Home colours

Coulsdon Town Football Club was a football club based in Coulsdon, Greater London, England.

== History ==
The club was established in 1968 as Reedham Park F.C. and played in the Croydon Saturday League. The club's name then came from the former Reedham Orphanage, which was in the same area as their first pitch at Higher Drive Recreation Ground. In 1975, the club moved to the Surrey Eastern Intermediate League, which became the Surrey South Eastern Combination following a merger. The club in the 1988–89 season, under the management of John Comerford, won the Premier Division championship and gained promotion to the Surrey County Premier League. In 1992 the club changed its name to Netherne F.C., to identify the club more closely with their present ground of Netherne C.A.S.C. and the local area, with the name of Netherne being associated with the former Netherne Hospital.

In 1994, they were promoted into the Combined Counties League, after winning the Surrey County Premier League, during the 1993–94 season, where they played before again changing name, to Netherne Village F.C. in 1998. During this period the club reached the 1st round of the FA Vase, in their debut campaign, in the 1995–96 season.

The club dropped out of the Combined Counties League following the 1998–99 season, as their Ground did not have floodlights, and dropped back into the Surrey Premier League. However they became founder members of the Combined Counties league's new Division One in 2003, when this new division did not require Floodlights. In 2005, the club's name reverted to Netherne F.C.. Only a year later, they once again changed names to Coulsdon Town F.C. In 2007 the club merged with Salfords and changed the name of the club to Coulsdon United Football Club.

In 2010 the club was demoted from the Combined Counties Football League again into the Surrey Elite Intermediate League, as a result of more problems with their ground. For the 2011–12 season, the club reverted their name back to Coulsdon Town. They left the Surrey Elite Intermediate League at the end of the 2013–14 season after finishing bottom of the table.

== Ground ==
The club played their home matches at Netherne Community Amateur Sports Club, Woodplace Lane, Coulsdon, CR5 1NE.

The ground has a capacity of 15,000 people. The Clubhouse was erected by the Hospital staff, from the former Netherne Hospital, as their social club in 1950 and originally there used to be running track surrounding the pitch.

== Honours ==
=== League honours ===
- Surrey County Premier League
  - Winners: 1993–94
- South Eastern League Premier Division
  - Winners: 1988–89

=== Cup honours ===
- Surrey Elite Intermediate Challenge Cup
  - Winners: 2011–12
  - Runners Up: 2012–13
- Partington Cup
  - Winners: 1991–92
- Premier League Cup
  - Winners: 1992–93

== Club records ==
- Highest League Position: 3rd in Combined Counties League: 1994–95
- Best FA Vase performance: First round: 1995–96
