= Dorking F.C. =

Dorking
- Full name: Dorking Football Club
- Nickname: The Chicks
- Founded: 1880
- Dissolved: 2017
- Ground: Westhumble Playing Fields
- Capacity: 2,000 (130 seated)
- 2016–17: Combined Counties League Division One, 15th of 18
Home colours	Away colours

Dorking Football Club was a football club based in Dorking, Surrey, England. The club was formed in 1880 and was the oldest senior football club in Surrey until folding in 2017.

== History ==
After playing in the Mid-Surrey League in the early 1900s, Dorking was a founder member of the Surrey County Senior League in 1922 and moved in 1956 to its current ground in Meadowbank Park, having previously played at a ground in Pixham Lane. The club joined the Corinthian league in 1956 and then the Athenian League in 1963. The club merged with Guildford City of the Southern League in 1974 to form Guildford & Dorking United, with Meadowbank as the home ground. However, after just two seasons, the club collapsed in mid-season, with another club being formed called Dorking Town in 1977 to complete its predecessor's remaining games before joining the Surrey Senior League in 1977–78. In 1983, by then playing in the Isthmian League, the club reverted its name to Dorking F.C.

In 1989–90 season Dorking reached the final of the Surrey Senior Cup, one of the oldest cup competitions, with the first final contested in 1882–83. This was an achievement the club had only once previously managed in the 1885–86 season, some 104 years previously. They lost both finals.

In the 1992–93 season, they reached the first round proper of the FA Cup for the first time in their history, losing 3–2 to Peter Shilton's Plymouth Argyle.

In the 2001–2 season Dorking reached the last 16 of the FA Vase, losing on penalties to Burgess Hill. In 2004–5 Dorking defeated Dartford away in the FA Cup and repeated the success the following season.

In the 2004–05 season, they played in the Isthmian League Division Two and gained promotion in 2005–06 to Division 1 South of Isthmian League but were relegated after just one season. The following season, as a result of the restructuring of non-league football they joined the Combined Counties Football League. In 2007–8 the club suffered relegation from the league's Premier Division in 2007–08, playing one season in Division One before gaining promotion back into the Premier Division through the play-offs.

Their club captain was Stewart Vaughan, who died after suffering from cancer. On 27 February 2007, a special benefit match was played in his honour in which Portsmouth came from the south coast to face Dorking. Before the match, players from young local football clubs were there to greet Vaughan with a special plaque. A record midweek floodlit attendance of 2,206 watched the match, in which Vaughan played the first five minutes of the match before being substituted. Portsmouth defeated Dorking 7–0. On 3 April 2007, another benefit match was played, just 48 hours after Vaughan's death, against a Crystal Palace XI. A two-minute silence was observed by the players, officials, and supporters to show their respect for the former captain before the game, in which 1,201 spectators saw Palace defeat Dorking 5–1.

During the 2015–16 season, Dorking FC were notified that their ground, Meadowbank, would not be ready until 2017–18, due to delays in construction, which had put the club in a financial crisis with the club needing to fund at least £30,000 to ensure another ground-sharing. This cost propelled the club into the possibility of folding due to this financial crisis now embedded in the club. However, after 4 months of uncertainty the club raised the funds and escaped administration and extinction with many supporters providing loans to the club. On 30 April 2016, it was announced that the departure of the first team management team of Glynn Stephens and Steve Hurd would take place at the end of the season. In May 2016 Danny Fox was appointed as the first team manager.

In February 2017, the club announced its closure.

== Ground ==
Dorking formerly played their home games at Meadowbank, Mill Lane, Dorking. The stadium was deemed unsafe in the 2002–03 season.

During the close season in 2014, it was announced that Dorking would share with Horley Town F.C. until the Meadowbank Stadium was once again fit for use. In March 2016, it was announced that Dorking would groundshare with local rivals Dorking Wanderers FC at the latter's Westhumble ground until the work at Meadowbank was completed. Meadowbank Stadium reopened on 6 July 2018, after Dorking F.C. had closed the previous year.

== Honours ==
- Surrey Senior Cup:
  - Runners-Up (2): 1885–86, 1989–90
- Surrey Junior Cup:
  - Winners (1): 1903–04

== Records ==
- FA Cup best performance: first round proper (1992–93) – Lost 3–2 at home to Plymouth Argyle
- FA Trophy best performance: second round proper – 1991–92
- FA Vase best performance: fourth round replay – 2001–02 2005/6 last 32 losing to Mildenhall
- Surrey Senior Cup finalists 1885–86, 1989–90

== Gallery ==
The Meadowbank Stadium

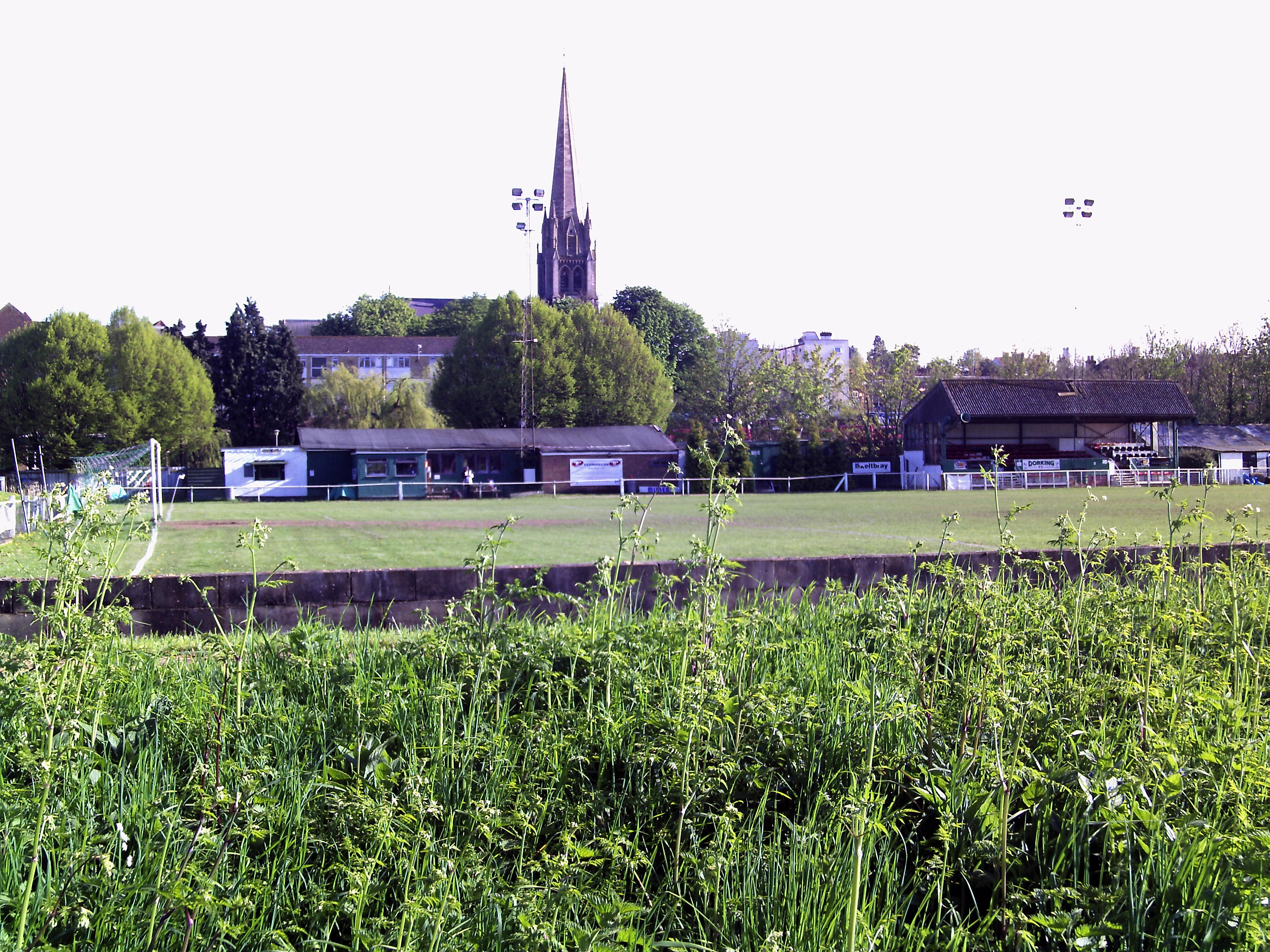

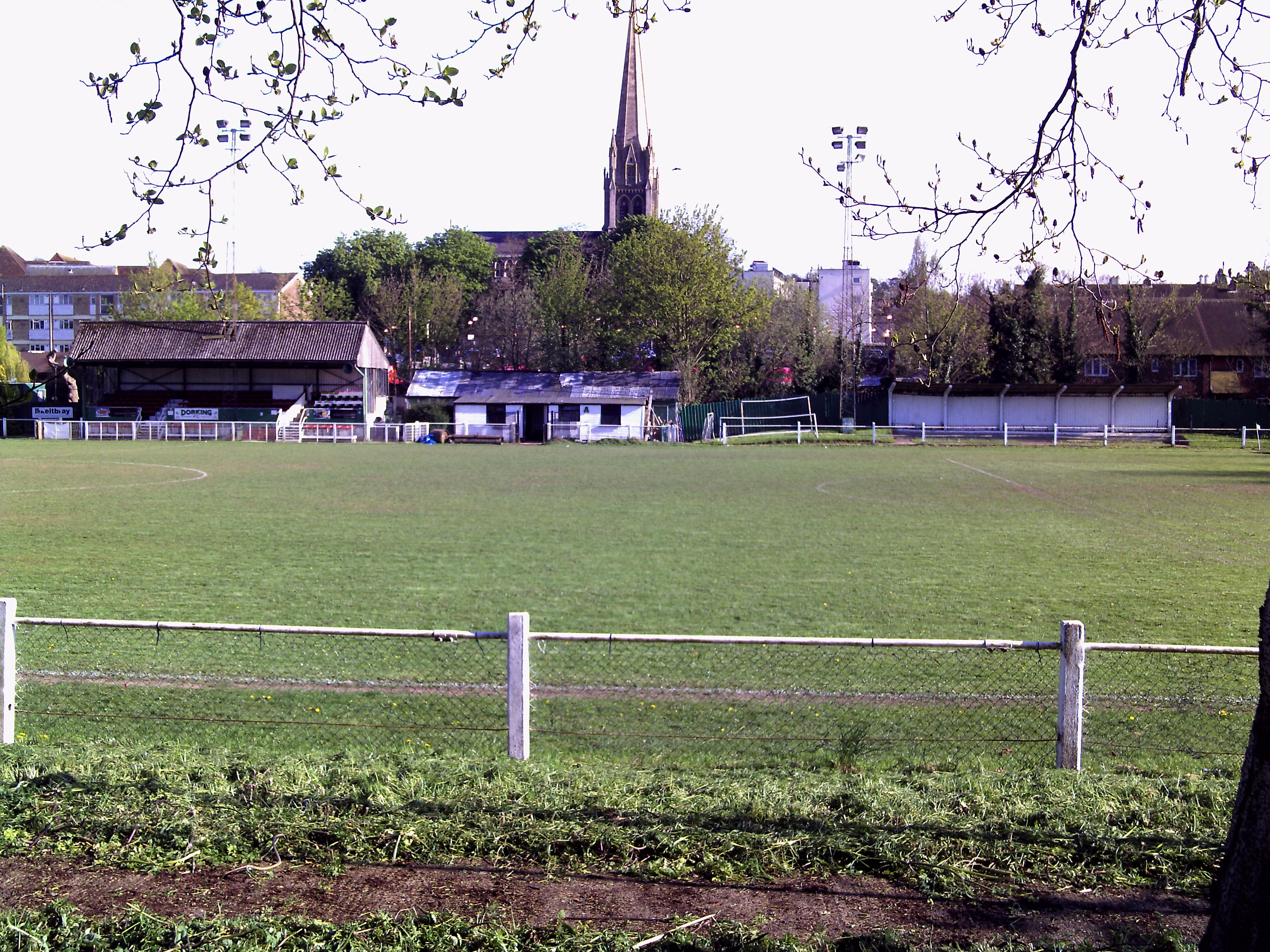

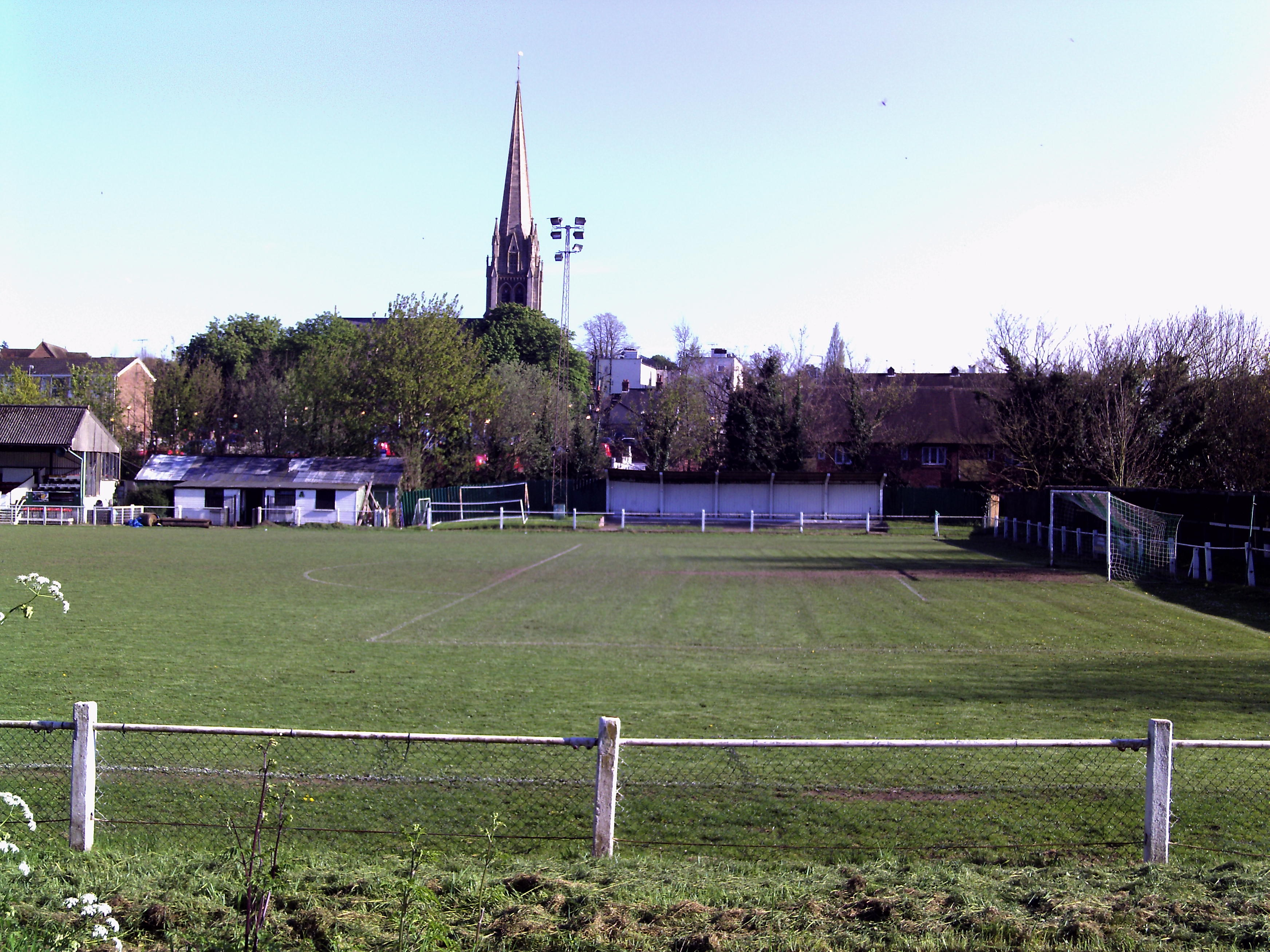
