= Feltham F.C. (1991) =

Feltham
- Full name: Feltham Football Club
- Founded: 1991
- Dissolved: May 2012
- Ground: The Orchard, Feltham

Feltham Football Club was a semi-professional football club in Feltham, Greater London, England.

== History ==
The club was established in 1991 as a merger between Feltham and Hounslow, and was initially named Feltham & Hounslow Borough. The new club took Feltham's place in the Isthmian League, starting in Division Three. In 1995 the club was renamed Feltham and dropped into the Combined Counties League due to ground grading issues. When the league gained a second division in 2003 they were played in the Premier Division, but after finishing second-from-bottom in 2005–06 they were relegated to Division One.

In May 2012 the club merged with Bedfont Football & Social Club to form Bedfont & Feltham.

== Ground ==
The club played at Feltham Arenas before leaving in 2004 with the intention of moving to a new ground at Green Lane in Hounslow. They shared at Egham Town in 2004-05 and then Hampton & Richmond Borough, before moving to share with Bedfont at the Orchard on Hatton Road in Feltham. At the time of the club's dissolution, it had a capacity of 1,200.

== Records ==
- Best FA Cup performance: First qualifying round, 1994–95
- Best FA Vase performance: Third round, 1992–93
- Most appearances: Colin Ryder, 363
