= Olumide Durojaiye =

Nigerian semi-professional footballer

Personal information
- Full name: Scott Olumide Durojaiye
- Date of birth: 20 October 1992 (age 34)
- Place of birth: London, England
- Height: 1.80 m (5 ft 11 in)
- Position: Midfielder

Team information
- Current team: Enfield Borough (manager)

Youth career
- 2004–2011: Tottenham Hotspur
- 2011–2013: Norwich City

Senior career*
Years	Team	Apps	(Gls)
2013–2015	Falkirk	22	(0)
2015	→ Brechin City (loan)	3	(0)
2015	Enfield Town	7	(0)
2015–2016	Haringey Borough	8	(1)
2016	Hayes & Yeading United	9	(0)
2015	Hungerford Town	0	(0)
2016	Hayes & Yeading United	8	(2)
2016–2017	Haringey Borough	19	(5)
2017–2018	Welling United	39	(3)
2018	Braintree Town	7	(0)
2018	Maidstone United	6	(0)
2018–2019	Haringey Borough	11	(1)
2019	Woking	11	(0)
2019–2021	Haringey Borough	30	(0)
2021–2022	Welling United	34	(2)
2022	Dartford	8	(1)
2022	Hereford	0	(0)
2022	Peterborough Sports	2	(0)
2022–2023	Haringey Borough	32	(4)
2023	Dover Athletic	0	(0)
2023–2024	Weymouth	24	(0)

Managerial career
- 2026–: Enfield Borough
- * Club domestic league appearances and goals as of 20:30, 20 June 2024 (UTC)

Scott Olumide Durojaiye (born 20 October 1992) is a Nigerian former professional footballer. He is currently manager of Enfield Borough.

He played youth football for Tottenham Hotspur and Norwich City, before joining Scottish sides Falkirk and Brechin City. He has also played for non-league clubs Braintree Town, Enfield Town, Dartford, Hayes & Yeading United, Hungerford Town, Haringey Borough, Maidstone United, Welling United and Woking.

== Club career ==
Durojaiye joined Tottenham Hotspur at the age of seven and worked his way through the ranks up to the Under-18s as a striker. After failing to be offered a professional contract, trialled with Cheltenham Town, Brentford and Oxford United before moving to Norwich City in August 2012. He signed a one-year professional deal but was released at the end of the season.

In July 2013, Durojaiye signed for Scottish Championship club Falkirk. He spent two seasons at the club before his release in May 2015.

On 20 February 2015, Durojaiye joined Scottish League One side Brechin City on loan for the remainder of the season.

Durojaiye joined Isthmian League Premier Division club Enfield Town ahead of the 2015–16 season. He failed to score for the club in 12 appearances and was released in early November. The following month, he completed a move to Haringey Borough.

In February 2016, Durojaiye joined Hayes & Yeading United and began playing in a defensive role. After a short spell at Hungerford Town ahead of the 2016–17 season, he returned to Hayes & Yeading for a second time in October 2016. He went on to score twice in 20 appearances for the club.

In December 2016, he returned to Haringey Borough. Durojaiye made 20 appearances for the club, including in the Isthmian League Division One North play-off semi-final, and scored braces against Bury Town and Great Wakering Rovers.

In August 2017, Durojaiye joined National League South club Welling United after impressing in a pre-season trial. On 5 August, he made his debut replacing Toby Ajala in a 3–2 defeat to Truro City.

Durojaiye joined Braintree Town for the 2017–18 season. On 10 September 2018, it was announced that Durojaiye had left the club despite starting all seven league fixtures.

On 21 September 2018, following his departure from Braintree, Durojaiye agreed to join fellow National League side, Maidstone United.

On 26 February 2019, Olumide agreed to join National League South side Woking, following a spell back at Haringey Borough.

Despite gaining promotion during his spell with Woking, prior to the 2019–20 campaign, Durojaiye opted to return to Haringey Borough once more.

On 22 January 2021, Durojaiye rejoined National League South side Welling United. On 18 March 2022, Welling United announced that Durojaiye was one of five players that had left the club.

On 26 March 2022, Durojaiye joined Dartford. He made his debut for the club on the same day, coming on as a second-half substitute in a 1-0 victory at Princes Park against Hampton & Richmond Borough.

On 6 July 2022, Durojaiye joined Hereford. However, on 3 August 2022 - under a month after signing for Hereford and before the National League North 2022-23 season kicked off - Durojaiye left the club having only appeared in a handful of pre-season friendlies.

On 30 July 2023, Durojaiye signed for National League South club Dover Athletic, however departed just one month later having failed to make an appearance.

== International career ==
Durojaiye is eligible to play for Nigeria and England and has previously expressed his desire to represent Nigeria. He was called up to the Under-20 Development squad.

== Coaching career ==
In February 2026 Durojaiye was appointed manager of Enfield Borough.

== Career statistics ==
As of match played 18 April 2024

Club	Season	League			National Cup		League Cup		Other		Total	
Club	Season	Division	Apps	Goals	Apps	Goals	Apps	Goals	Apps	Goals	Apps	Goals
Falkirk	2013–14	Scottish Championship	17	0	0	0	2	0	3 (Note: Two appearances in Scottish Challenge Cup, one in Scottish Championship play-offs)	0	22	0
Falkirk	2014–15	Scottish Championship	5	0	1	0	3	0	2 (Note: Appearance(s) in Scottish Challenge Cup)	0	11	0
Falkirk	Total		22	0	1	0	5	0	5	0	33	0
Brechin City (loan)	2014–15	Scottish League One	3	0	—		—		—		3	0
Enfield Town	2015–16	Isthmian League Premier Division	7	0	2	0	—		3 (Note: Two appearances in Alan Turvey Trophy, one in FA Trophy)	0	12	0
Haringey Borough	2015–16	Isthmian League Division One North	8	1	0	0	—		0	0	8	1
Hayes & Yeading United	2015–16	National League South	9	0	0	0	—		0	0	9	0
Hungerford Town	2016–17	National League South	0	0	0	0	—		1 (Note: Appearance(s) in Berks & Bucks Senior Cup)	0	1	0
Hayes & Yeading United	2016–17	Southern League Premier Division	8	2	0	0	—		3 (Note: Two appearances in Southern League Cup, one in FA Trophy)	0	11	2
Haringey Borough	2016–17	Isthmian League Division One North	19	5	0	0	—		1 (Note: Appearance(s) in Isthmian League Division One North play-offs)	0	20	5
Welling United	2017–18	National League South	39	3	1	0	—		2 (Note: One appearance in Kent Senior Cup, one in FA Trophy)	0	42	3
Braintree Town	2018–19	National League	7	0	0	0	—		0	0	7	0
Maidstone United	2018–19	National League	6	0	3	0	—		0	0	9	0
Haringey Borough	2018–19	Isthmian League Premier Division	11	1	0	0	—		0	0	11	1
Woking	2018–19	National League South	11	0	0	0	—		2 (Note: Appearance(s) in National League South play-offs)	0	13	0
Haringey Borough	2019–20	Isthmian League Premier Division	24	0	3	0	—		3 (Note: Two appearances in FA Trophy, one in Alan Turvey Trophy)	0	30	0
Haringey Borough	2020–21	Isthmian League Premier Division	6	0	4	0	—		0	0	10	0
Haringey Borough	Total		30	0	7	0	—		3	0	40	0
Welling United	2020–21	National League South	3	1	0	0	—		0	0	3	1
Welling United	2021–22	National League South	31	1	1	0	—		1 (Note: Appearance(s) in FA Trophy)	0	33	1
Welling United	Total		34	2	1	0	—		1	0	36	2
Dartford	2021–22	National League South	8	1	—		—		3 (Note: Two appearances in the Kent Senior Cup) (Note: One appearance in the National League South Play-Offs)	0	11	1
Hereford	2022–23	National League North	0	0	0	0	—		0	0	0	0
Peterborough Sports	2022–23	National League North	2	0	0	0	—		0	0	2	0
Haringey Borough	2022–23	Isthmian League Premier Division	32	4	1	0	—		6 (Note: One appearance in FA Trophy, two in Alan Turvey Trophy and three in London Senior Cup)	2	39	6
Dover Athletic	2023–24	National League South	0	0	0	0	—		0	0	0	0
Weymouth	2023–24	National League South	24	0	0	0	—		2 (Note: Two appearances in FA Trophy)	0	26	0
Career total			280	19	16	0	5	0	32	2	333	21
