= Haringey Borough =

Haringey Borough may refer to:

- London Borough of Haringey
- Haringey Borough F.C., a London football club
