= 2015–16 Isthmian League =

The 2015–16 season is the 101st season of the Isthmian League, which is an English football competition featuring semi-professional and amateur clubs from London, East and South East England. Also, it is the tenth season for the current incarnations of the Division One North and Division One South.

The league constitution was announced on 15 May 2015.

After the constitution was announced, Clevedon Town of Southern League Division One South & West were demoted because their floodlights were not to the required standard. As a result, Ware were transferred to Southern League Division One Central from Isthmian League Division One North, and Redbridge were reprieved from relegation.

== Premier Division ==
Isthmian League Premier Division
- Season: 2015–16
- Champions: Hampton & Richmond
- Promoted: East Thurrock United; Hampton & Richmond
- Relegated: Brentwood Town; Farnborough; Lewes; VCD Athletic
- Matches: 552
- Goals: 1,694 (3.07 per match)
- Top goalscorer: 38 goals - Sam Higgins (East Thurrock United)
- Highest attendance: 2,467 - Dulwich Hamlet 2 - 1 Lewes, (16 April)
- Total attendance: 173,234
- Average attendance: 314 (-19.5% to previous season)

The Premier Division consisted of 24 clubs: 18 clubs from the previous season, and six new clubs:

- Brentwood Town, promoted as play-off winners in Division One North
- Burgess Hill Town, promoted as champions of Division One South
- Farnborough, relegated from the Conference South
- Merstham, promoted as play-off winners in Division One South
- Needham Market, promoted as champions of Division One North
- Staines Town, relegated from the Conference South

Farnborough were required by the Isthmian League to pay their creditors in full before the league's 2016 AGM. If this wasn't fulfilled, the league were to relegate the club. Therefore, if Farnborough finished top, they were not to be promoted. If they finished in a play-off place, they were not to be eligible to take part in the play-off competition. If they finished between 6th and 20th, they were to be relegated to Step 4. If they finished between 21st and 24th, they were to be relegated two steps, to Step 5.

Hampton & Richmond Borough won the division and returned to the National League South after four seasons in the Isthmian League. They were joined by play-off winners East Thurrock United, who reached National League for the first time in their history. Farnborough finally finished 18th and were relegated one step, as the result, Burgess Hill Town were reprieved. Brentwood Town relegated straight back to Division One along with Lewes and VCD Athletic.

=== League table ===
Pos	Team	Pld	W	D	L	GF	GA	GD	Pts	Promotion or relegation
1	Hampton & Richmond	46	28	11	7	105	52	+53	95	Promoted to the National League South
2	Bognor Regis Town	46	29	7	10	95	42	+53	94	Qualified for the play-offs
3	East Thurrock United	46	26	13	7	107	53	+54	91	Qualified for the play-offs, then promoted to the National League South
4	Tonbridge Angels	46	24	13	9	90	49	+41	85	Qualified for the play-offs
5	Dulwich Hamlet	46	23	12	11	93	58	+35	81	Qualified for the play-offs
6	Enfield Town	46	24	8	14	74	47	+27	80	
7	Kingstonian	46	21	10	15	78	64	+14	73	
8	Leiston	46	20	12	14	72	57	+15	72	
9	Billericay Town	46	18	17	11	76	53	+23	71	
10	Merstham	46	18	8	20	74	80	−6	62	
11	Leatherhead	46	18	8	20	67	81	−14	62	
12	Metropolitan Police	46	17	10	19	60	79	−19	61	
13	Wingate & Finchley	46	17	9	20	66	70	−4	60	
14	Canvey Island	46	17	9	20	69	89	−20	60	
15	Grays Athletic	46	15	12	19	63	74	−11	57	
16	Staines Town	46	15	10	21	53	74	−21	55	
17	Harrow Borough	46	15	9	22	66	80	−14	54	
18	Farnborough	46	16	5	25	65	88	−23	53	Demoted to SFL Division One Central
19	Hendon	46	13	13	20	68	85	−17	52	
20	Needham Market	46	13	12	21	51	76	−25	51	
21	Burgess Hill Town	46	12	14	20	57	73	−16	50	Reprieved from relegation
22	Brentwood Town	46	10	10	26	51	80	−29	40	Relegated to Division One North
23	Lewes	46	6	16	24	48	87	−39	34	Relegated to Division One South
24	VCD Athletic	46	8	10	28	46	103	−57	34	Relegated to Division One North

Source: The Ryman Isthmian Football League
Rules for classification: 1) points; 2) goal difference; 3) number of goals scored.

==== Top scorers ====
Player	Club	Goals
Sam Higgins	East Thurrock United	38
Jason Prior	Bognor Regis Town	36
Martin Tuohy	Canvey Island	24
Nathan Elder	Tonbridge Angels	24
Thomas Wraight	East Thurrock United	21
Corey Whitely	Enfield Town	21
Luke Blewden	Tonbridge Angels	20
Billy Healey	Wingate & Finchley	20
Charlie Penny	Merstham	20

==== Play-offs ====
===== Semifinals =====
28 April 2016	Bognor Regis Town	0–1	Dulwich Hamlet	Bognor Regis
19:45		Dulwich Hamlet report	Carew 90'	Stadium: Nyewood Lane; Attendance: 1,403

28 April 2016	East Thurrock United	2–0	Tonbridge Angels	Corringham
19:45	Hayles 8'; Marlow 45'	East Thurrock report Tonbridge Angels report		Stadium: Rookery Hill; Attendance: 849

===== Final =====
2 May 2016	East Thurrock United	3–1	Dulwich Hamlet	Corringham
15:00	Craddock 11'; Hayles 19'; Hayles 32'	East Thurrock report Dulwich Hamlet report	Hibbert 37'	Stadium: Rookery Hill; Attendance: 1,661

=== Results ===
Home \ Away	BIL	BOG	BRE	BUR	CAN	DUL	ETU	ENF	FAR	GRY	H&R	HAR	HEN	KIN	LEA	LEI	LEW	MER	MET	NDH	STA	TON	VCD	W&F
Billericay Town		2–0	1–1	0–0	0–3	4–1	3–1	3–0	2–3	1–1	0–1	2–1	3–1	0–0	2–0	4–1	1–1	1–1	6–0	1–1	2–3	1–1	1–1	4–0
Bognor Regis Town	3–1		3–1	2–1	5–0	2–3	2–2	1–1	4–1	3–0	1–0	1–0	4–0	0–0	5–0	3–0	4–0	4–3	2–1	2–1	3–0	0–5	2–0	6–0
Brentwood Town	1–1	0–1		1–1	3–3	1–2	1–3	1–2	1–1	1–2	0–3	2–1	4–1	0–0	4–1	0–2	0–1	1–2	2–2	1–0	7–0	0–1	2–0	0–1
Burgess Hill Town	1–1	0–4	1–1		3–2	3–2	0–2	1–0	3–1	1–2	1–2	0–5	0–1	1–3	1–2	1–1	2–1	5–1	4–2	2–2	0–2	0–0	2–0	0–1
Canvey Island	0–2	1–1	1–0	3–3		1–2	2–4	2–0	1–0	0–3	0–4	1–0	3–2	2–1	3–1	1–1	5–2	0–2	0–3	1–2	2–3	1–1	2–1	2–1
Dulwich Hamlet	1–0	2–0	4–0	1–1	3–0		2–2	2–0	2–2	1–1	3–3	4–0	4–2	5–1	1–0	1–1	2–1	4–0	1–2	0–1	1–2	2–1	5–2	2–1
East Thurrock United	1–1	0–0	4–0	1–0	4–0	2–2		1–0	4–1	3–0	2–1	2–0	2–4	2–2	4–4	4–0	4–1	1–2	4–2	1–2	0–0	3–0	4–1	1–1
Enfield Town	2–2	2–1	2–1	1–0	2–1	2–2	1–1		4–1	2–0	2–3	3–0	2–0	4–0	4–0	0–2	2–1	2–2	2–0	3–0	2–1	0–1	3–0	2–0
Farnborough	0–2	2–1	3–0	1–0	2–6	1–4	0–3	0–0		5–0	0–3	2–1	1–0	3–2	1–3	3–0	5–1	0–3	0–1	1–1	2–3	1–2	3–0	2–1
Grays Athletic	2–0	0–2	4–0	2–0	2–0	1–2	0–0	1–0	3–1		0–3	3–2	1–1	1–3	0–2	0–2	4–0	1–3	3–3	0–2	1–1	1–1	0–1	0–0
Hampton & Richmond	2–1	2–1	5–1	1–1	5–0	2–1	2–1	0–0	3–1	3–1		2–2	5–0	3–1	2–0	4–3	0–4	2–1	1–0	5–0	3–2	2–2	4–0	1–2
Harrow Borough	2–1	1–2	1–0	1–0	1–2	1–0	2–5	1–2	3–1	3–0	1–1		5–5	1–3	2–2	0–0	4–1	0–2	0–3	0–2	1–0	1–1	1–2	1–0
Hendon	1–1	1–1	1–1	1–0	2–2	1–1	1–2	1–0	3–0	2–2	1–1	0–1		1–1	2–3	2–4	2–0	2–2	0–2	0–2	2–0	0–3	3–1	4–3
Kingstonian	2–2	2–1	4–0	1–0	2–1	0–3	1–4	1–0	1–2	2–1	4–1	5–2	1–0		0–3	1–0	2–2	3–1	7–0	4–2	0–1	1–3	3–0	2–1
Leatherhead	4–1	0–3	1–0	3–2	4–4	1–0	2–1	0–3	0–1	3–0	2–2	1–2	2–5	0–0		3–2	3–0	0–2	1–3	2–2	3–0	0–2	2–0	0–0
Leiston	1–1	0–2	2–0	1–1	1–1	1–1	0–3	2–0	4–2	1–2	3–1	2–0	2–0	2–1	3–1		3–1	3–1	1–2	3–0	3–1	1–2	3–0	0–1
Lewes	2–3	0–2	1–5	1–2	3–1	3–1	1–1	0–2	1–0	1–1	1–1	1–1	2–2	1–2	3–4	1–1		1–0	1–2	0–0	2–2	0–1	2–2	0–0
Merstham	0–2	3–2	1–3	1–2	1–0	0–2	2–2	0–4	1–1	2–2	1–6	0–1	1–0	3–1	1–2	0–2	2–2		1–0	2–0	5–1	2–2	6–1	0–2
Metropolitan Police	1–0	1–0	0–0	1–1	0–1	1–3	0–3	2–2	1–2	2–4	0–3	3–2	3–0	2–1	1–0	0–3	0–0	2–3		1–0	0–0	0–3	1–1	1–3
Needham Market	1–3	0–1	4–0	1–2	2–3	2–1	1–3	2–3	0–2	0–0	1–1	2–4	0–3	0–0	1–0	2–2	1–0	1–0	1–1		0–1	2–1	0–3	1–3
Staines Town	0–1	0–1	0–1	2–2	2–2	1–3	3–2	0–1	2–0	0–4	1–2	1–1	1–3	0–2	1–0	2–2	3–0	2–0	3–1	0–2		1–1	1–0	1–2
Tonbridge Angels	2–2	1–3	4–0	2–3	2–0	1–1	1–2	3–1	2–0	2–3	1–0	3–3	3–1	1–1	4–0	0–1	1–0	3–2	0–1	3–3	2–0		7–0	4–3
VCD Athletic	2–3	1–1	0–2	2–2	0–1	3–2	1–3	3–2	2–1	4–2	1–1	2–3	2–3	0–3	0–1	0–0	0–0	1–3	3–3	1–1	0–3	0–3		2–1
Wingate & Finchley	0–1	1–3	2–1	5–1	1–2	1–1	1–3	1–2	4–3	3–2	1–3	3–1	1–1	2–1	1–1	1–0	1–1	1–3	1–3	6–0	0–0	0–1	2–0	

Updated to match(es) played on 23 April 2016. Source:
Legend: Blue = home team win; Yellow = draw; Red = away team win.

=== Stadia and locations ===
Locations of the Premier Division clubs
Greater London Premier Division football clubs

Club	Stadium	Capacity
Billericay Town	New Lodge	3,500
Bognor Regis Town	Nyewood Lane	4,500
Brentwood Town	The Brentwood Centre Arena	1,800
Burgess Hill Town	Leylands Park	2,500
Canvey Island	Park Lane	4,500
Dulwich Hamlet	Champion Hill	3,000
East Thurrock United	Rookery Hill	4,000
Enfield Town	Queen Elizabeth II Stadium	2,500
Farnborough	Paddy Power Park	4,000
Grays Athletic	The Mill Field (groundshare with Aveley)	1,100
Hampton & Richmond Borough	Beveree Stadium	3,500
Harrow Borough	Earlsmead Stadium	3,070
Hendon	Earlsmead Stadium (groundshare with Harrow Borough)	3,070
Kingstonian	Kingsmeadow (groundshare with AFC Wimbledon)	4,850
Leatherhead	Fetcham Grove	3,400
Leiston	Victory Road	2,500
Lewes	The Dripping Pan	3,000
Needham Market	Bloomfields	4,000
Merstham	Moatside	2,000
Metropolitan Police	Imber Court	3,000
Staines Town	Wheatsheaf Park	3,009
Tonbridge Angels	Longmead Stadium	5,000
VCD Athletic	Oakwood	1,180
Wingate & Finchley	The Harry Abrahams Stadium	1,500

== Division One North ==
Isthmian League Division One North
- Season: 2015–16
- Champions: AFC Sudbury
- Promoted: AFC Sudbury; Harlow Town
- Relegated: Barkingside; Redbridge
- Matches: 552
- Goals: 1,751 (3.17 per match)
- Top goalscorer: 39 goals - Jason Hallett (Cheshunt)
- Highest attendance: 769 - AFC Sudbury 2 - 0 Bury Town, (2 January)
- Total attendance: 72,944
- Average attendance: 132 (+6.5% to previous season)

Division One North consisted of 24 clubs: 19 clubs from the previous season, and five new clubs:

- AFC Hornchurch, relegated from the Premier Division
- Bury Town, relegated from the Premier Division
- Haringey Borough, promoted as champions of the Essex Senior League
- Phoenix Sports, promoted as champions of the Southern Counties East League
- Witham Town, relegated from the Premier Division

AFC Sudbury won the division and were promoted to the Premier Division for the first time in their history. Harlow Town won the play-offs and returned to the Premier Division after seven seasons of absence. Barkingside and Redbridge, both reprieved in the previous season, finished bottom of the table and were relegated, while Wroxham were reprieved from relegation as the best eighth level club finished in the relegation zone due to lack of promoting ninth level clubs.

=== League table ===
Pos	Team	Pld	W	D	L	GF	GA	GD	Pts	Promotion or relegation
1	AFC Sudbury	46	33	6	7	90	49	+41	105	Promoted to the Premier Division
2	Thurrock	46	30	6	10	99	52	+47	96	Qualified for the play-offs
3	Harlow Town	46	29	9	8	92	47	+45	96	Qualified for the play-offs, then promoted to the Premier Division
4	Cray Wanderers	46	27	9	10	98	52	+46	90	Qualified for the play-offs, then transferred to Division One South
5	AFC Hornchurch	46	25	11	10	87	35	+52	86	Qualified for the play-offs
6	Cheshunt	46	22	14	10	88	50	+38	80	
7	Maldon & Tiptree	46	22	12	12	89	66	+23	78	
8	Brightlingsea Regent	46	22	11	13	76	55	+21	77	
9	Dereham Town	46	21	11	14	82	61	+21	74	
10	Thamesmead Town	46	21	11	14	74	63	+11	74	
11	Tilbury	46	20	9	17	85	66	+19	69	
12	Aveley	46	20	8	18	84	71	+13	68	
13	Bury Town	46	16	14	16	74	68	+6	62	
14	Phoenix Sports	46	16	8	22	60	74	−14	56	
15	Haringey Borough	46	12	14	20	61	76	−15	50	
16	Romford	46	12	12	22	59	83	−24	48	
17	Soham Town Rangers	46	13	9	24	61	90	−29	48	
18	Great Wakering Rovers	46	12	11	23	69	103	−34	47	
19	Witham Town	46	12	9	25	59	96	−37	45	
20	Heybridge Swifts	46	12	8	26	59	87	−28	44	
21	Waltham Abbey	46	11	8	27	54	80	−26	41	
22	Wroxham	46	10	10	26	50	89	−39	40	Reprieved from relegation
23	Barkingside	46	9	10	27	55	97	−42	37	Relegated to the Essex Senior League
24	Redbridge	46	8	4	34	46	141	−95	28	Relegated to the Essex Senior League

Source: The Ryman Isthmian Football League
Rules for classification: 1) points; 2) goal difference; 3) number of goals scored.

==== Top scorers ====
Player	Club	Goals
Jason Hallett	Cheshunt	39
George Purcell	AFC Hornchurch	33
Alexander Read	Harlow Town	31
Christian Assombalonga	Waltham Abbey	26
Luke Tuttle	Dereham Town	26

==== Play-offs ====
===== Semifinals =====
27 April 2016	Harlow Town	3–0	Cray Wanderers	Harlow
19:45	Dadson 46'; Read 49' (pen.); Wixon 58'	Harlow Town report		Stadium: Barrows Farm; Attendance: 832

27 April 2016	Thurrock	0–2	AFC Hornchurch	Thurrock
19:45		Thurrock report	Purcell 11' (pen.); Luke 38'	Stadium: Ship Lane; Attendance: 514

===== Final =====
1 May 2016	Harlow Town	3–1	AFC Hornchurch	Harlow
15:00	Styles 12' (o.g.); Wixon 30'; Eadie 70'	Harlow Town report	Purcell 41' (pen.)	Stadium: Barrows Farm; Attendance: 1,655

=== Results ===
Home \ Away	AFC	SUD	AVE	BAR	BRI	BUR	CHE	CRA	DER	GWR	HAY	HAR	HEY	M&T	PHO	RED	ROM	SOH	THA	THU	TIL	WAL	WIT	WRO
AFC Hornchurch		1–1	1–2	5–1	2–0	3–0	0–2	2–1	3–0	0–0	4–1	0–0	2–1	1–3	1–0	6–0	0–1	2–1	1–1	0–0	0–0	2–0	2–0	3–0
AFC Sudbury	1–1		3–1	1–0	1–3	2–0	0–0	2–6	2–1	5–1	2–0	0–1	4–2	0–2	1–0	5–1	5–2	5–2	2–0	0–4	3–0	0–2	2–1	2–1
Aveley	1–3	0–1		1–0	2–4	3–2	3–1	1–1	2–2	1–1	1–1	1–2	1–0	0–0	2–4	6–1	1–1	3–1	0–2	0–2	0–4	3–2	3–0	1–0
Barkingside	1–2	1–3	0–5		0–0	0–1	3–3	2–5	2–1	2–1	0–1	1–2	0–0	2–2	0–1	0–1	4–0	1–1	2–5	0–4	0–3	2–4	3–2	2–1
Brightlingsea Regent	1–1	1–1	0–0	1–2		2–2	3–2	1–2	1–0	4–1	1–1	0–1	1–0	1–0	0–3	1–3	3–1	3–0	2–1	2–2	1–4	4–1	4–0	0–1
Bury Town	1–1	1–1	5–1	4–1	0–1		0–0	1–1	1–2	2–0	5–3	0–3	1–3	1–2	0–0	4–1	5–1	1–1	1–1	2–3	2–0	3–4	4–4	1–0
Cheshunt	1–2	0–1	1–1	4–0	2–2	1–1		0–1	1–0	3–0	1–0	2–0	4–2	1–0	1–0	4–2	2–0	1–1	2–0	3–0	3–2	3–1	1–1	3–3
Cray Wanderers	0–2	1–2	3–1	4–0	2–3	3–3	2–0		0–1	3–1	4–2	3–1	2–4	1–1	5–0	5–0	0–1	6–1	1–0	1–2	3–2	2–1	1–0	3–1
Dereham Town	0–3	0–1	0–2	2–1	5–1	1–1	0–4	2–2		5–1	3–3	2–2	1–0	3–2	1–2	5–0	1–0	1–0	3–0	2–2	4–2	1–0	2–2	2–0
Great Wakering Rovers	0–5	1–2	3–2	1–4	0–0	0–1	0–0	0–0	1–5		1–1	2–2	3–2	1–2	1–0	1–0	2–3	2–0	2–3	1–4	6–1	3–2	2–0	3–4
Haringey Borough	0–3	1–3	3–1	2–3	2–2	2–3	0–4	0–0	0–0	3–1		2–3	1–0	0–2	1–2	2–0	1–1	2–2	1–1	2–2	0–2	1–2	2–3	1–3
Harlow Town	3–1	1–2	4–1	3–1	0–1	2–0	2–0	1–1	2–0	3–1	0–0		3–1	2–1	4–0	4–0	1–1	3–0	1–0	4–1	3–2	2–1	5–2	4–0
Heybridge Swifts	1–0	1–1	2–0	1–0	1–5	2–1	1–8	0–1	0–2	2–3	1–4	1–2		1–2	2–0	2–2	1–1	1–3	1–2	2–4	2–1	3–3	2–2	1–0
Maldon & Tiptree	1–1	0–2	2–1	3–0	1–0	3–1	3–3	1–2	2–2	2–3	1–2	1–1	4–0		2–3	3–3	3–1	3–0	4–3	2–2	4–4	0–3	3–0	5–4
Phoenix Sports	2–4	1–4	0–3	0–2	1–0	0–1	1–2	2–1	3–2	3–3	0–3	2–2	3–1	1–2		4–1	0–0	2–0	1–1	0–2	1–2	1–2	1–2	1–2
Redbridge	0–6	0–4	1–4	2–2	0–3	0–1	1–1	2–4	0–5	1–2	0–1	0–1	1–0	3–2	0–3		1–6	3–1	3–4	0–4	1–5	1–0	2–1	0–2
Romford	2–0	0–1	0–5	2–1	0–2	3–3	1–3	2–3	1–2	2–1	0–1	4–3	2–0	0–2	0–0	3–0		1–2	2–3	1–1	0–3	2–0	1–0	0–0
Soham Town Rangers	1–0	0–1	3–1	1–0	2–1	0–3	1–1	0–2	2–3	2–2	2–1	1–0	2–4	1–2	1–1	4–1	4–2		2–2	1–2	1–4	2–1	1–2	1–0
Thamesmead Town	1–1	1–2	0–2	1–1	0–2	1–0	1–2	1–2	1–0	3–2	1–0	2–1	0–0	2–2	3–2	5–2	2–1	3–0		1–0	2–1	4–3	3–2	0–0
Thurrock	2–1	5–1	2–1	3–1	1–0	2–1	1–0	0–1	1–2	4–1	3–2	1–2	3–1	2–0	0–1	3–1	3–1	3–0	1–4		3–1	2–1	1–2	5–1
Tilbury	0–1	0–1	0–2	1–1	0–1	3–1	4–3	0–0	2–2	4–0	0–0	3–1	1–0	0–0	5–3	4–1	3–1	2–2	1–0	0–1		2–1	4–0	1–0
Waltham Abbey	1–0	0–3	1–2	3–3	1–2	0–1	0–0	2–1	2–1	2–2	1–1	0–2	0–3	1–2	0–2	2–0	1–1	0–4	0–0	1–3	0–0		0–1	2–1
Witham Town	0–4	1–2	0–5	3–2	0–3	0–1	3–2	1–2	1–1	2–2	2–3	1–2	1–1	1–3	1–2	3–0	3–3	3–2	1–3	0–3	2–0	1–0		2–1
Wroxham	0–4	1–2	2–5	1–1	3–3	1–1	0–3	0–4	0–2	2–4	0–1	1–1	0–3	0–2	1–1	3–4	1–1	3–2	1–0	1–0	3–2	1–0	0–0	

Updated to match(es) played on 23 April 2016. Source:
Legend: Blue = home team win; Yellow = draw; Red = away team win.

=== Stadia and locations ===
Locations of Division One North clubs
Greater London Division One North clubs

Club	Stadium	Capacity
AFC Hornchurch	Hornchurch Stadium	3,500
AFC Sudbury	King's Marsh	2,500
Aveley	The Mill Field	1,100
Barkingside	Cricklefield Stadium (groundshare with Ilford)	3,500
Brightlingsea Regent	North Road	1,000
Bury Town	Ram Meadow	3,500
Cheshunt	Cheshunt Stadium	3,000
Cray Wanderers	Hayes Lane (groundshare with Bromley)	6,000
Dereham Town	Aldiss Park	3,000
Great Wakering Rovers	Burroughs Park	2,500
Haringey Borough	Coles Park	1,500
Harlow Town	Barrows Farm	3,500
Heybridge Swifts	Scraley Road	3,000
Maldon & Tiptree	Wallace Binder Ground	2,000
Phoenix Sports	Victory Road	2,000
Redbridge	Oakside	3,000
Romford	Ship Lane (groundshare with Thurrock)	3,500
Soham Town Rangers	Julius Martin Lane	2,000
Thamesmead Town	Bayliss Avenue	6,000
Thurrock	Ship Lane	3,500
Tilbury	Chadfields	4,000
Waltham Abbey	Capershotts	3,500
Witham Town	Spa Road	2,500
Wroxham	Trafford Park	2,000

== Division One South ==
Isthmian League Division One South
- Season: 2015–16
- Champions: Folkestone Invicta
- Promoted: Folkestone Invicta; Worthing
- Relegated: Peacehaven & Telscombe; Walton & Hersham; Whitstable Town
- Matches: 552
- Goals: 1,785 (3.23 per match)
- Top goalscorer: 37 goals - Ian Draycott (Folkestone Invicta)
- Highest attendance: 1,545 - Folkestone Invicta 6 - 0 Walton & Hersham, (25 March)
- Total attendance: 112,992
- Average attendance: 205 (-3.8% to previous season)

Division One South consisted of 24 clubs: 20 clubs from the previous season, and four new clubs:

- Chatham Town, transferred from Division One North
- Dorking Wanderers, promoted from the Sussex County League
- Molesey, promoted as champions of the Combined Counties League
- Peacehaven & Telscombe, relegated from the Premier Division

Folkestone Invicta won the division and returned to the Premier Division after four consecutive play-off defeats. Worthing won the play-offs and joined them after nine seasons in Division One South. Peacehaven & Telscombe suffered second consecutive relegation and left the league along with Whitstable Town and Walton & Hersham. Both clubs also spent nine seasons in the division.

=== League table ===
Pos	Team	Pld	W	D	L	GF	GA	GD	Pts	Promotion or relegation
1	Folkestone Invicta	46	36	6	4	102	34	+68	114	Promotion to the Premier Division
2	Dorking Wanderers	46	27	9	10	99	56	+43	90	Qualification for the play-offs
3	Worthing	46	27	7	12	96	56	+40	88	Qualification for the play-offs, then promoted to the Premier Division
4	Hythe Town	46	27	6	13	74	49	+25	87	Qualification for the play-offs
5	Faversham Town	46	25	8	13	76	45	+31	83	Qualification for the play-offs
6	Corinthian-Casuals	46	26	7	13	75	52	+23	82 (Note: Corinthian-Casuals were deducted three points for fielding a suspended player against Faversham Town on 16 January 2016.)	
7	Hastings United	46	25	6	15	99	64	+35	81	
8	Herne Bay	46	22	10	14	79	54	+25	76	
9	Molesey	46	23	6	17	87	83	+4	75	
10	Carshalton Athletic	46	21	9	16	83	74	+9	72	
11	South Park	46	21	9	16	78	71	+7	72	
12	Ramsgate	46	21	8	17	92	76	+16	71	
13	Guernsey	46	21	5	20	94	88	+6	68	
14	Three Bridges	46	20	6	20	59	67	−8	66	
15	Whyteleafe	46	19	5	22	69	77	−8	62	
16	Walton Casuals	46	18	6	22	74	85	−11	60	
17	Tooting & Mitcham United	46	16	10	20	66	71	−5	58	
18	Sittingbourne	46	16	6	24	63	77	−14	54	
19	Chatham Town	46	13	7	26	61	70	−9	46	
20	East Grinstead Town	46	12	7	27	55	84	−29	43	
21	Chipstead	46	11	6	29	54	92	−38	39	
22	Walton & Hersham	46	9	6	31	50	113	−63	30 (Note: Walton & Hersham were deducted three points for fielding an ineligible player against Whitstable Town on 8 August 2015.)	Relegation to the Combined Counties League
23	Whitstable Town	46	8	2	36	52	118	−66	26	Relegation to the Southern Counties East League
24	Peacehaven & Telscombe	46	6	7	33	48	129	−81	25	Relegation to the Southern Combination League

Source: The Ryman Isthmian Football League
Rules for classification: 1) points; 2) goal difference; 3) number of goals scored.

==== Top scorers ====
Player	Club	Goals
Ian Draycott	Folkestone Invicta	37
Tom Tolfrey	Dorking Wanderers	36
Joe Taylor	Ramsgate	33
Ross Allen	Guernsey	32
Billy Medlock	Hastings United	25

==== Play-offs ====
===== Semifinals =====
26 April 2016	Dorking Wanderers	1–2	Faversham Town	Dorking
19:45	Hackett 10'		Scarborough 57'; Robertson 89'	Stadium: Westhumble Community Ground; Attendance: 316

26 April 2016	Worthing	7–0	Hythe Town	Worthing
19:45	Bugiel 10' 83'; Maguire-Drew 19' 81'; Newton 48'; Elphick 58'; Pope 77' (pen.)	Worthing report	Reeves (red card) 77'	Stadium: Woodside Road; Attendance: 948

===== Final =====
30 April 2016	Worthing	3–0	Faversham Town	Worthing
15:00	O'Neill 6'; Elphick 23'; Maguire-Drew 67'	Worthing report	Harvey (red card) 18'	Stadium: Woodside Road; Attendance: 1,889

=== Results ===
Home \ Away	CAR	CHA	CHI	COR	DOW	EGT	FAV	FOL	GUE	HAS	HER	HYT	MOL	PET	RAM	SIT	SPK	THR	T&M	W&H	WAL	WHT	WHY	WOR
Carshalton Athletic		1–1	1–2	1–1	0–4	2–2	3–0	1–1	4–1	3–1	1–3	0–1	3–2	4–0	5–2	3–0	1–1	4–1	1–0	2–3	3–1	2–1	1–2	2–3
Chatham Town	0–1		0–1	1–2	2–3	1–0	0–1	0–1	4–1	2–1	0–2	1–2	1–1	1–1	1–2	1–1	1–2	2–3	1–3	4–0	2–1	1–2	1–2	0–3
Chipstead	1–3	0–1		1–1	0–1	2–3	0–2	2–2	4–1	1–1	1–2	1–2	1–4	2–1	2–3	0–0	1–4	1–1	0–2	1–1	0–1	3–1	3–2	1–2
Corinthian-Casuals	2–0	4–0	3–1		1–2	1–0	3–1	0–1	1–0	2–2	1–2	1–0	1–2	3–1	2–1	1–0	1–2	1–0	0–2	5–1	0–1	4–2	0–1	2–0
Dorking Wanderers	1–0	0–0	5–0	4–1		5–3	5–1	1–0	4–0	1–2	4–2	1–3	1–2	2–2	1–0	0–0	1–5	3–1	1–3	3–0	2–1	2–0	1–2	2–2
East Grinstead Town	2–3	2–1	0–2	1–1	0–2		2–1	0–1	2–1	0–1	0–0	2–2	2–1	0–1	0–2	0–2	0–2	2–0	1–2	4–0	0–1	3–1	1–2	2–4
Faversham Town	1–1	2–0	2–1	1–2	2–1	2–1		2–2	0–2	3–0	0–1	4–0	3–1	2–0	1–1	1–0	1–2	3–1	2–1	1–1	7–0	2–1	1–0	0–0
Folkestone Invicta	3–1	2–1	2–1	4–0	1–1	3–0	0–2		5–2	1–0	4–0	3–0	3–1	3–1	2–2	3–1	1–0	1–0	3–1	6–0	2–1	3–0	3–0	1–0
Guernsey	2–1	3–1	2–1	2–4	2–1	3–1	1–2	1–2		1–4	0–0	3–1	4–2	6–1	3–0	3–0	2–3	1–0	6–2	4–1	6–2	2–0	2–1	1–1
Hastings United	0–1	1–0	6–0	3–3	2–3	5–2	1–4	1–4	2–0		1–2	3–1	4–2	6–0	3–2	2–0	5–1	0–1	2–0	2–0	1–0	6–1	2–0	1–3
Herne Bay	1–1	1–2	4–1	0–1	0–0	1–1	1–1	1–3	1–1	2–0		0–2	3–1	7–0	1–2	3–1	3–2	2–1	0–0	3–0	4–0	0–2	1–0	3–4
Hythe Town	3–0	3–1	3–0	1–1	0–3	2–0	2–0	2–1	1–1	1–1	0–2		0–0	0–1	4–2	2–0	3–0	1–0	2–1	4–0	0–3	2–1	0–0	3–0
Molesey	2–1	2–1	2–0	0–1	2–2	1–0	1–5	0–1	4–0	2–1	3–2	1–3		4–2	3–2	2–1	2–2	1–2	3–2	6–2	4–1	2–0	1–3	1–4
Peacehaven & Telscombe	2–4	0–4	1–3	0–1	2–4	1–1	1–0	2–4	2–1	0–4	0–3	0–3	1–2		2–3	2–6	1–0	2–0	1–1	1–2	1–1	0–2	1–3	0–2
Ramsgate	7–1	1–1	3–0	3–2	1–1	4–0	1–0	2–1	2–1	2–2	1–0	1–3	2–1	8–1		1–3	2–3	4–0	0–1	1–1	2–0	2–3	3–0	1–1
Sittingbourne	1–2	2–1	1–6	1–2	1–2	2–1	2–1	1–2	3–2	1–3	1–2	0–2	1–1	3–1	4–0		2–1	1–2	0–3	2–2	1–2	1–0	3–2	0–2
South Park	1–0	0–0	2–0	1–1	2–0	1–3	0–2	0–4	4–4	1–1	0–4	1–0	6–2	1–1	1–3	1–1		0–2	1–0	1–1	1–2	2–0	3–1	0–1
Three Bridges	2–3	2–1	3–1	0–1	0–6	1–1	1–0	0–1	1–2	3–2	0–3	3–0	0–2	3–3	2–0	1–0	1–4		2–2	1–0	2–1	3–0	0–0	2–0
Tooting & Mitcham United	3–0	2–7	0–1	0–3	3–0	4–0	1–1	0–2	4–1	0–2	1–1	0–1	2–2	2–0	3–0	0–1	4–1	0–2		1–1	0–3	2–2	1–1	1–1
Walton & Hersham	1–3	1–2	0–1	0–3	1–4	1–3	0–1	0–3	1–2	2–4	1–4	1–3	2–3	2–0	3–2	0–2	2–3	0–2	2–1		3–2	4–1	1–2	1–3
Walton Casuals	2–2	1–2	3–2	2–3	2–2	2–1	1–1	1–1	1–5	0–2	2–0	2–1	1–2	3–1	1–2	5–3	0–1	3–1	2–3	1–0		1–0	1–2	2–2
Whitstable Town	1–2	0–2	3–1	0–2	0–1	2–3	0–4	0–1	3–1	1–2	2–2	0–3	1–2	4–3	2–4	0–5	1–6	1–3	3–0	1–2	0–8		2–4	0–1
Whyteleafe	1–3	2–5	3–1	1–0	0–2	0–1	0–2	1–3	4–3	4–1	2–0	1–2	2–0	3–2	2–2	1–2	0–2	1–1	0–1	1–2	4–1	4–2		1–2
Worthing	2–2	2–0	2–0	3–0	2–4	5–2	0–1	1–2	0–2	1–3	3–0	2–0	1–2	5–0	2–1	3–0	3–1	0–2	5–1	2–0	1–2	5–3	5–1	

Updated to match(es) played on 23 April 2016. Source:
Legend: Blue = home team win; Yellow = draw; Red = away team win.

=== Stadia and locations ===
Locations of Division One South clubs
Greater London Division One South clubs

Club	Stadium	Capacity
Carshalton Athletic	War Memorial Sports Ground	5,000
Chatham Town	The Sports Ground	5,000
Chipstead	High Road	2,000
Corinthian-Casuals	King George's Field	2,700
Dorking Wanderers	Westhumble Community Ground	1,500
East Grinstead Town	East Court	1,000
Faversham Town	Shepherd Neame Stadium	2,000
Folkestone Invicta	Cheriton Road	4,000
Guernsey	Footes Lane	5,000
Hastings United	The Pilot Field	4,050
Herne Bay	Winch's Field	4,000
Hythe Town	Reachfields Stadium	3,000
Molesey	Walton Road Stadium	1,000
Peacehaven & Telscombe	The Sports Park	1,500
Ramsgate	Southwood Stadium	2,500
Sittingbourne	Woodstock Park	3,000
South Park	King George's Field	2,000
Three Bridges	Jubilee Field	1,500
Tooting & Mitcham United	Imperial Fields	3,500
Walton & Hersham	The Sports Ground	2,000
Walton Casuals	Moatside (groundshare with Merstham)	2,000
Whitstable Town	The Belmont Ground	3,000
Whyteleafe	Church Road	2,000
Worthing	Worthing Stadium	4,000

== League Cup ==
2015–16 Alan Turvey Trophy
Tournament details
- Country: England
- Teams: 67

Final positions
- Champions: Kingstonian
- Runners-up: Faversham Town

Tournament statistics
- Matches played: 66
- Goals scored: 254 (3.85 per match)

The 2015–16 Alan Turvey Trophy sponsored by Robert Dyas (formerly the Isthmian League Cup) is the 42nd season of the Alan Turvey Trophy, the cup competition of the whole Isthmian League.

=== Calendar ===
Round	Dates	Matches	Clubs
Premilinary round	17 August to 18 August	3	67 → 64
First round	18 August to 5 October	32	64 → 32
Second round	6 October to 19 October	16	32 → 16
Third round	9 November to 8 December	8	16 → 8
Quarterfinals	12 January to 16 February	4	8 → 4
Semifinals	29 February to 1 March	2	4 → 2
Final	6 April	1	2 → 1

The Isthmian League Cup was voluntary this season, five clubs decided not to take part in the competition:

- Bognor Regis Town
- Cray Wanderers
- Dereham Town
- Guernsey
- Wroxham

=== Premilinary round ===
Six clubs participated in the Premilinary round, while all other clubs received a bye to the first round.

Tie	Home team (tier)	Score	Away team (tier)	Att.
1	AFC Sudbury (N)	1–5	Brightlingsea Regent (N)	136
2	Barkingside (N)	0–9	AFC Hornchurch (N)	145
3	Billericay Town (P)	1–2	Aveley (N)	121

=== First round ===
The three clubs to have made it through the Premilinary round were entered into the draw with every other Isthmian League club, making sixty-four teams.

Tie	Home team (tier)	Score	Away team (tier)	Att.
4	Brentwood Town (P)	1–2	Enfield Town (P)	85
5	Bury Town (N)	0–3	Leiston (P)	161
6	Canvey Island (P)	2–2	Grays Athletic (P)	153
Grays Athletic advance 3–1 on penalties
7	Chipstead (S)	1–2	Walton & Hersham (S)	41
8	Corinthian-Casuals (S)	4–0	South Park (S)	67
9	Dorking Wanderers (S)	2–1	Peacehaven & Telscombe (S)	33
10	Dulwich Hamlet (P)	2–0	Thamesmead Town (N)	245
11	Farnborough (P)	3–2	Lewes (P)	91
12	Folkestone Invicta (S)	2–0	Ramsgate (S)	187
13	Haringey Borough (N)	2–2	Metropolitan Police (P)	42
Metropolitan Police advance 4–3 on penalties
14	Harrow Borough (P)	2–3	Kingstonian (P)	55
15	Hastings United (S)	3–2	Hythe Town (S)	221
16	Merstham (P)	1–2	Sittingbourne (S)	84
17	Molesey (S)	0–2	Hendon (P)	35
18	Needham Market (P)	5–0	Heybridge Swifts (N)	130
19	Redbridge (N)	0–3	Cheshunt (N)	45
20	Romford (N)	0–3	East Thurrock United (P)	96
21	Soham Town Rangers (N)	0–3	Brightlingsea Regent (N)	63

Tie	Home team (tier)	Score	Away team (tier)	Att.
22	Staines Town (P)	2–0	Hampton & Richmond Borough (P)	209
23	Three Bridges (S)	1–1	Leatherhead (P)	81
Three Bridges advance 11–10 on penalties
24	Thurrock (N)	2–1	Aveley (N)	61
25	Tilbury (N)	1–3	Great Wakering Rovers (N)	59
26	Tonbridge Angels (P)	2–0	Herne Bay (S)	228
27	Tooting & Mitcham United (S)	5–1	Phoenix Sports (N)	98
28	VCD Athletic (P)	1–2	Chatham Town (S)	61
29	Waltham Abbey (N)	1–1	AFC Hornchurch (N)	84
Waltham Abbey advance 4–3 on penalties
30	Walton Casuals (S)	4–0	East Grinstead Town (S)	73
31	Whitstable Town (S)	1–1	Faversham Town (S)	157
Faversham Town advance 5–4 on penalties
32	Whyteleafe (S)	1–1	Carshalton Athletic (S)	76
Carshalton Athletic advance 5–4 on penalties
33	Wingate & Finchley (P)	1–0	Harlow Town (N)	81
34	Witham Town (N)	2–3	Maldon & Tiptree (N)	67
35	Worthing (S)	2–2	Burgess Hill Town (P)	211
Burgess Hill Town advance 4–3 on penalties

=== Second round ===
Tie	Home team (tier)	Score	Away team (tier)	Att.
36	Chatham Town (S)	0–1	Sittingbourne (S)	127
37	Corinthian-Casuals (S)	3–1	Carshalton Athletic (S)	75
38	Dorking Wanderers (S)	3–1	Burgess Hill Town (P)	67
39	Dulwich Hamlet (P)	2–1	Staines Town (P)	224
40	Enfield Town (P)	1–0	Cheshunt (N)	170
41	Farnborough (P)	4–0	Three Bridges (S)	102
42	Faversham Town (S)	2–1	Folkestone Invicta (S)	178
43	Grays Athletic (P)	2–2	East Thurrock United (P)	159
Grays Athletic advance 3–2 on penalties
44	Great Wakering Rovers (N)	5–1	Thurrock (N)	68

Tie	Home team (tier)	Score	Away team (tier)	Att.
45	Hendon (P)	2–2	Kingstonian (P)	83
Kingstonian advance 3–1 on penalties
46	Maldon & Tiptree (N)	0–3	Leiston (P)	43
47	Needham Market (P)	1–3	Brightlingsea Regent (N)	126
48	Tonbridge Angels (P)	2–2	Hastings United (S)	294
Hastings United advance 3–0 on penalties
49	Tooting & Mitcham United (S)	4–1	Metropolitan Police (P)	92
50	Waltham Abbey (N)	3–4	Wingate & Finchley (P)	65
51	Walton Casuals (S)	2–5	Walton & Hersham (S)	49

=== Third round ===
Tie	Home team (tier)	Score	Away team (tier)	Att.
52	Brightlingsea Regent (N)	1–2	Enfield Town (P)	94
53	Dulwich Hamlet (P)	1–2	Faversham Town (S)	372
54	Hastings United (S)	1–1	Sittingbourne (S)	132
Sittingbourne advance 4–3 on penalties
55	Kingstonian (P)	2–1	Farnborough (P)	149

Tie	Home team (tier)	Score	Away team (tier)	Att.
56	Leiston (P)	2–1	Great Wakering Rovers (N)	84
57	Tooting & Mitcham United (S)	2–1	Corinthian-Casuals (S)	88
Tooting & Mitcham played an ineligible player, Corinthian-Casuals advance
58	Walton & Hersham (S)	0–2	Dorking Wanderers (S)	50
59	Wingate & Finchley (P)	5–4	Grays Athletic (P)	75

=== Quarterfinals ===
Tie	Home team (tier)	Score	Away team (tier)	Att.
60	Enfield Town (P)	1–3	Wingate & Finchley (P)	155
61	Faversham Town (S)	1–0	Dorking Wanderers (S)	110

Tie	Home team (tier)	Score	Away team (tier)	Att.
62	Leiston (P)	0–2	Kingstonian (P)	77
63	Sittingbourne (S)	2–1	Corinthian-Casuals (S)	70

=== Semifinals ===
Tie	Home team (tier)	Score	Away team (tier)	Att.
64	Faversham Town (S)	3–0	Sittingbourne (S)	337
65	Kingstonian (P)	2–2	Wingate & Finchley (P)	178
Kingstonian advance 4–2 on penalties

=== Final ===
6 April 2016 66	Faversham Town	0–5	Kingstonian	Carshalton
19:30		Isthmian League report Kingstonian report	Brown 13' (o.g.); Bennett 44'; Bennett 79'; Bonnett-Johnson 84'; McCollin 90'	Stadium: Colston Avenue; Attendance: 488

== See also ==
- Isthmian League
- 2015–16 Northern Premier League
- 2015–16 Southern Football League
