= 2014–15 Essex Senior Football League =

The 2014–15 season was the 44th in the history of Essex Senior Football League, a football competition in England.

The league featured 19 clubs which competed in the league last season, along with one new club:

- Waltham Forest relegated from the Isthmian League

Also, London APSA changed name to Newham.

Haringey Borough were champions, winning their first Essex Senior League title and were promoted to the Isthmian League two seasons after their transfer from the Spartan South Midlands League.

== League table ==
Essex Senior Football League
- Season: 2014–15
- Champions: Haringey Borough
- Promoted: Haringey Borough
- Matches: 380
- Goals: 1,441 (3.79 per match)

Pos	Team	Pld	W	D	L	GF	GA	GD	Pts	Promotion or relegation
1	Haringey Borough	38	34	1	3	129	30	+99	103	Promoted to the Isthmian League
2	Bowers & Pitsea	38	29	5	4	124	25	+99	92	
3	Barking	38	28	5	5	80	31	+49	89	
4	Hullbridge Sports	38	23	5	10	76	44	+32	74	
5	Sawbridgeworth Town	38	21	3	14	102	71	+31	66	
6	FC Romania	38	21	2	15	88	72	+16	65	
7	Stansted	38	18	6	14	68	63	+5	60	
8	Clapton	38	17	6	15	71	65	+6	57	
9	Waltham Forest	38	15	9	14	85	79	+6	54	
10	Ilford	38	16	6	16	63	72	−9	54	
11	Takeley	38	16	6	16	71	85	−14	54	
12	Basildon United	38	12	8	18	70	75	−5	44	
13	Newham	38	13	4	21	59	100	−41	43	
14	Eton Manor	38	10	9	19	56	86	−30	39	
15	London Bari	38	10	8	20	66	81	−15	38	
16	Enfield 1893	38	10	6	22	49	79	−30	36	
17	Tower Hamlets	38	9	8	21	38	81	−43	35	
18	Southend Manor	38	8	7	23	55	99	−44	31	
19	Greenhouse London	38	9	2	27	47	92	−45	29	
20	Sporting Bengal United	38	5	6	27	44	111	−67	16 (Note: Sporting Bengal United were deducted five points.)	

Source: FA Full-Time
Rules for classification: 1) points; 2) goal difference; 3) number of goals scored.
