= 2014–15 Southern Counties East Football League =

The 2014–15 Southern Counties East Football League season (known as the 2014–15 Hurliman Southern Counties East Football League for sponsorship reasons) was the 2nd under the current name and 49th overall in the history of the Southern Counties East Football League, a football competition in England.

== League table ==
Southern Counties East Football League
- Season: 2014–15
- Champions: Phoenix Sports
- Promoted: Phoenix Sports
- Matches: 380
- Goals: 1,345 (3.54 per match)

The league consisted of 16 clubs from the previous season along with four new clubs:

- Crowborough Athletic, transferred from the Sussex County League
- Croydon, transferred from the Combined Counties League
- Erith & Belvedere, relegated from the Isthmian League
- Lingfield, transferred from the Sussex County League

=== League table ===
Pos	Team	Pld	W	D	L	GF	GA	GD	Pts	Promotion or relegation
1	Phoenix Sports	38	28	9	1	94	20	+74	93	Promoted to the Isthmian League Division One North
2	Ashford United	38	25	10	3	96	39	+57	85	
3	Erith & Belvedere	38	25	7	6	83	36	+47	82	
4	Greenwich Borough	38	22	8	8	88	49	+39	74	
5	Tunbridge Wells	38	19	9	10	74	51	+23	66	
6	Corinthian	38	19	2	17	78	67	+11	59	
7	Cray Valley Paper Mills	38	16	10	12	77	63	+14	58	
8	Sevenoaks Town	38	15	10	13	68	61	+7	55	
9	Beckenham Town	38	16	5	17	77	63	+14	53	
10	Crowborough Athletic	38	14	7	17	62	78	−16	49	
11	Woodstock Sports	38	14	6	18	45	60	−15	48	Club folded
12	Canterbury City	38	14	5	19	50	69	−19	47	
13	Deal Town	38	14	4	20	66	78	−12	46	
14	Holmesdale	38	11	7	20	74	90	−16	40	
15	Lordswood	38	10	9	19	43	77	−34	39	
16	Fisher	38	10	8	20	49	79	−30	38	
17	Lingfield	38	12	2	24	76	129	−53	38	Voluntary demoted to the Southern Combination League Division One
18	Croydon	38	10	5	23	40	70	−30	35	
19	Erith Town	38	9	7	22	48	84	−36	34	
20	Rochester United	38	9	6	23	57	82	−25	33	

Source: http://scefl.com
Rules for classification: 1) points; 2) goal difference; 3) number of goals scored.

=== Results ===
Home \ Away	ASH	BEC	CAN	COR	CVP	CRW	CRD	DEA	E&B	ERI	FIS	GRE	HOL	LIN	LOR	PHO	ROC	SEV	TUN	WOO
Ashford United		2–1	1–1	3–1	0–1	2–0	4–0	3–0	2–1	1–1	6–1	1–1	4–1	2–1	0–0	0–0	4–3	0–0	4–2	4–0
Beckenham Town	1–1		2–3	4–2	5–4	4–1	2–1	6–1	1–2	5–0	2–2	1–5	1–1	4–2	2–0	0–3	3–0	0–2	2–3	2–3
Canterbury City	0–5	1–0		3–0	0–2	0–0	2–1	3–0	0–1	3–1	3–0	0–1	1–3	3–4	2–1	0–4	2–1	0–1	2–1	1–0
Corinthian	2–3	1–0	0–1		4–0	4–1	2–2	4–2	2–1	3–2	2–0	3–1	1–2	2–3	1–2	0–4	1–2	2–1	2–1	2–0
Cray Valley Paper Mills	3–2	2–0	2–3	3–0		2–3	2–2	4–1	1–1	2–1	4–1	2–3	2–1	2–4	1–0	1–1	8–1	1–1	0–1	1–1
Crowborough Athletic	2–2	1–5	2–0	2–3	2–0		3–1	1–1	0–3	0–3	0–0	1–1	3–2	7–2	2–3	1–1	2–1	1–2	1–2	4–2
Croydon	0–1	1–0	3–1	0–2	0–1	0–2		2–0	0–1	1–2	1–3	1–0	2–1	2–3	1–2	0–5	3–1	0–0	0–3	2–1
Deal Town	0–2	1–2	4–1	1–1	1–3	3–1	6–2		1–2	1–0	3–0	0–7	6–0	4–1	1–1	0–2	1–4	3–1	2–4	4–1
Erith & Belvedere	4–0	0–3	4–0	1–0	3–2	4–1	1–1	1–0		5–1	4–0	1–1	3–1	5–1	1–1	0–1	1–0	2–1	0–2	2–1
Erith Town	1–3	1–0	2–3	0–4	3–3	2–3	0–2	3–2	1–1		0–0	1–5	0–3	4–2	3–1	1–5	0–5	2–3	0–0	0–2
Fisher	1–5	3–3	1–1	1–5	0–1	4–1	2–0	1–4	0–4	2–1		2–3	1–1	1–2	3–0	0–3	0–1	3–3	3–0	0–1
Greenwich Borough	1–4	1–0	4–1	2–1	1–1	3–0	2–0	5–0	0–1	2–1	2–1		0–4	3–1	2–2	1–3	2–2	2–4	1–1	1–0
Holmesdale	3–4	3–3	2–1	6–1	1–3	1–2	0–0	0–2	2–2	5–1	0–3	0–6		8–0	3–1	2–4	1–1	0–2	1–1	0–1
Lingfield	0–7	1–3	2–3	1–5	3–2	0–2	6–1	1–5	3–6	0–2	2–1	2–7	3–2		6–1	1–1	6–5	2–3	1–2	1–4
Lordswood	0–4	0–2	2–0	0–5	3–2	1–2	2–1	1–2	0–1	1–0	4–1	0–2	1–3	3–2		1–4	1–1	1–1	0–0	0–1
Phoenix Sports	1–2	3–2	1–0	1–0	1–1	4–0	3–0	1–0	1–0	0–0	2–2	1–0	10–0	6–1	3–1		4–0	2–0	1–0	2–1
Rochester United	1–2	1–2	2–2	0–0	0–1	4–3	1–0	0–1	0–3	2–2	1–2	1–2	2–1	1–2	2–2	1–3		2–0	1–2	1–2
Sevenoaks Town	2–2	0–1	3–1	5–6	1–1	2–1	1–0	1–1	2–2	1–0	0–1	2–4	7–4	6–2	2–2	0–2	3–4		1–1	1–2
Tunbridge Wells	0–2	2–1	4–2	2–0	3–3	2–2	1–4	3–1	1–3	2–4	3–1	3–3	4–1	2–0	7–0	1–1	3–0	1–0		0–0
Woodstock Sports	2–2	1–0	1–0	2–0	3–2	1–2	1–3	3–1	2–6	1–2	1–2	0–0	0–5	1–1	1–2	0–0	2–0	0–2	0–2	

Legend: Blue = home team win; Yellow = draw; Red = away team win.
