= 2016–17 Isthmian League =

The 2016–17 season was the 102nd season of the Isthmian League, which is an English football competition featuring semi-professional and amateur clubs from London, East and South East England. Also, it was the eleventh season for the current incarnations of Division One North and Division One South. The league constitution was announced on 12 May 2016 and concluded on 1 May 2017.

== Premier Division ==
Isthmian League Premier Division
- Season: 2016–17
- Champions: Havant & Waterlooville
- Promoted: Havant & Waterlooville; Bognor Regis Town
- Relegated: Canvey Island; AFC Sudbury; Grays Athletic
- Matches: 552
- Goals: 1,709 (3.1 per match)
- Top goalscorer: 29 goals - Matthew Blake (Leiston)
- Total attendance: 184,483
- Average attendance: 334 (+6.4% to previous season)

Farnborough were required by the Isthmian League to pay their creditors in full before the league's 2016 AGM. As this was not fulfilled, the league relegated the club from the Premier Division to Step 4, and Burgess Hill Town were reprieved from relegation.

The Premier Division consisted of 24 clubs: 18 clubs from the previous season, and six new clubs:

- AFC Sudbury, promoted as champions of Division One North
- Folkestone Invicta, promoted as champions of Division One South
- Harlow Town, play-off winners in Division One North
- Havant & Waterlooville, relegated from National League South
- Lowestoft Town, relegated from National League North
- Worthing, play-off winners in Division One South

Havant & Waterlooville were pronounced champions of the Premier Division on 22 April 2017, and returned to the National League at the first attempt along with play-off winners Bognor Regis Town, who spent eight years in the Isthmian League after relegation from Conference South in 2009. AFC Sudbury, who reached Premier Division for the first time in their history relegated back to Division One North along with Canvey Island and Grays Athletic. Harrow Borough were reprieved from relegation after Worcester City, who relegated from National League North took a further voluntary demotion to the Midland League for financial reasons.

=== League table ===
Pos	Team	Pld	W	D	L	GF	GA	GD	Pts	Promotion, qualification or relegation
1	Havant & Waterlooville	46	28	10	8	88	43	+45	94	Promoted to the National League South
2	Bognor Regis Town	46	27	11	8	87	41	+46	92	Qualified for the play-offs, then promoted to the National League South (Note: Four teams play for one spot and promotion to the National League North / South.)
3	Dulwich Hamlet	46	22	14	10	89	55	+34	80	Qualified for the play-offs
4	Enfield Town	46	21	13	12	86	57	+29	76	Qualified for the play-offs
5	Wingate & Finchley	46	23	6	17	63	61	+2	75	Qualified for the play-offs
6	Tonbridge Angels	46	21	11	14	66	55	+11	74	
7	Leiston	46	21	10	15	98	66	+32	73	
8	Billericay Town	46	21	9	16	77	56	+21	72	
9	Needham Market	46	20	12	14	76	80	−4	72	
10	Harlow Town	46	20	7	19	76	72	+4	67	
11	Lowestoft Town	46	18	10	18	63	73	−10	64	
12	Staines Town	46	16	13	17	78	68	+10	61	
13	Leatherhead	46	16	12	18	72	72	0	57 (Note: Leatherhead were deducted three points for fielding an ineligible player in their win over Hendon on 10 December.)	
14	Worthing	46	16	8	22	73	85	−12	56	
15	Folkestone Invicta	46	15	10	21	75	82	−7	55	
16	Kingstonian	46	16	7	23	65	73	−8	55	
17	Metropolitan Police	46	15	9	22	54	72	−18	54	
18	Hendon	46	14	12	20	68	88	−20	54	
19	Burgess Hill Town	46	14	12	20	59	80	−21	54	
20	Merstham	46	15	11	20	70	72	−2	53 (Note: Merstham were deducted three points for fielding an ineligible player in their win over Leiston on 28 February.)	
21	Harrow Borough	46	14	11	21	60	80	−20	53	Reprieved from relegation
22	Canvey Island	46	13	13	20	63	92	−29	52	Relegated to North Division
23	AFC Sudbury	46	12	10	24	57	85	−28	46	Relegated to North Division
24	Grays Athletic	46	11	5	30	46	101	−55	38	Relegated to North Division

Source: IL official site
Rules for classification: 1) Points; 2) Goal difference; 3) Number of goals scored; 4) Number of matches won; 5) Head-to-head results

==== Top scorers ====
Player	Club	Goals
Matthew Blake	Leiston	29
Ryan Moss	Kingstonian	24
James Fraser	Bognor Regis Town	23
Jake Reed	Lowestoft Town	22
Lloyd Dawes	Worthing	20

==== Play-offs ====
Semifinals
2	Bognor Regis Town	2
5	Wingate & Finchley	1
3	Dulwich Hamlet	4
4	Enfield Town	2

Final
2	Bognor Regis Town	2
3	Dulwich Hamlet	1

===== Semi-finals =====
27 April 2017	Bognor Regis Town	2–1	Wingate & Finchley	Nyewood Lane, Bognor Regis
19:45	Pearce 50', 90'		Cronin 86' (pen.)	Attendance: 1,001

27 April 2017	Dulwich Hamlet	4–2	Enfield Town	Champion Hill, East Dulwich
19:45	Sekajja 1', 31', 32'; Tomlin 65'		Crook 38'; Ottaway 85'	Attendance: 2,517

===== Final =====
1 May 2017	Bognor Regis Town	2–1	Dulwich Hamlet	Nyewood Lane, Bognor Regis
15:00	Muitt 21'; Pearce 42'		Kargbo 77'	Attendance: 3,119

=== Results ===
Home \ Away	SUD	BIL	BOG	BUR	CAN	DUL	ENF	FOL	GRY	HRL	HRB	H&W	HEN	KIN	LEA	LEI	LOW	MER	MET	NDH	STA	TON	W&F	WOR
AFC Sudbury		2–3	0–4	3–0	1–1	2–2	2–0	3–1	5–1	1–2	1–3	0–2	0–4	1–1	1–2	1–3	1–1	0–4	3–0	1–1	3–1	0–1	2–2	1–0
Billericay Town	2–3		0–2	4–0	3–1	0–2	2–4	1–0	2–0	1–1	2–1	0–2	4–1	0–2	4–2	2–0	0–1	1–1	1–1	6–0	1–0	2–1	3–0	3–0
Bognor Regis Town	2–1	2–1		1–1	4–0	1–1	1–1	7–1	1–2	3–0	1–0	1–1	0–2	2–0	1–0	1–0	1–3	2–0	1–1	2–1	2–0	2–0	3–1	5–0
Burgess Hill Town	2–0	2–1	1–3		1–1	0–3	1–0	4–2	2–1	0–1	5–1	3–3	1–0	2–1	3–2	0–6	1–3	2–1	1–4	0–3	3–3	1–2	2–3	0–1
Canvey Island	2–2	1–2	0–5	2–1		1–0	1–5	1–3	3–1	1–1	3–0	1–2	3–1	1–2	3–0	2–3	3–0	2–2	1–2	2–2	0–6	0–1	1–4	2–0
Dulwich Hamlet	2–0	0–3	1–3	2–2	1–2		2–1	6–1	0–1	3–1	1–4	3–0	2–1	4–2	1–1	2–4	3–1	5–0	3–3	2–0	3–1	1–2	1–1	4–1
Enfield Town	1–0	2–2	1–0	0–1	1–1	2–2		3–1	2–0	3–0	0–0	1–4	6–0	3–0	2–1	1–1	2–2	2–3	1–0	3–3	2–1	1–1	0–1	2–1
Folkestone Invicta	4–2	1–0	1–2	3–1	6–0	1–1	2–0		0–1	1–4	3–0	1–3	1–2	3–1	1–1	2–0	4–1	0–0	2–0	0–1	1–1	1–0	1–0	2–4
Grays Athletic	1–3	1–0	1–1	1–1	2–0	0–2	1–3	0–3		3–1	2–5	0–2	1–2	2–1	1–2	1–1	0–3	1–0	0–2	1–2	2–2	0–2	1–2	1–4
Harlow Town	1–3	0–2	3–1	2–2	2–2	1–2	0–3	2–2	5–0		2–0	0–2	2–0	1–0	2–1	1–2	1–2	2–1	3–1	5–1	1–0	1–0	3–0	6–2
Harrow Borough	1–1	0–0	0–1	0–2	1–1	0–2	1–5	4–1	1–3	2–0		2–1	0–2	0–4	3–1	3–1	4–2	1–0	0–0	0–3	0–0	1–0	0–1	2–2
Havant & Waterlooville	6–0	1–2	1–0	1–0	4–0	2–1	0–2	1–0	5–0	5–2	3–1		3–2	1–1	3–1	0–0	1–0	3–0	1–2	1–3	1–1	2–0	1–1	3–2
Hendon	1–2	1–0	2–2	1–1	0–0	1–1	1–1	3–3	0–4	2–2	4–5	1–1		1–4	1–3	2–1	0–0	2–1	2–0	2–1	1–1	1–2	0–1	0–3
Kingstonian	3–0	0–3	1–2	2–0	3–1	0–1	0–2	2–2	2–1	0–1	2–3	0–0	1–1		1–2	4–2	2–5	2–1	2–1	1–2	3–2	0–3	1–2	1–3
Leatherhead	2–0	3–2	1–3	1–2	1–1	2–2	2–1	2–0	1–1	3–2	2–2	0–1	3–2	2–3		3–3	3–1	3–0	2–1	1–1	0–1	0–0	1–0	1–1
Leiston	2–1	4–1	1–1	2–0	4–0	2–2	1–1	2–1	4–1	5–2	2–2	3–1	2–3	4–4	1–0		1–2	1–2	4–0	5–1	0–1	2–0	1–2	2–0
Lowestoft Town	2–2	1–1	2–1	1–0	0–3	0–3	2–1	2–2	2–1	4–0	2–0	0–2	3–3	1–0	1–0	3–2		1–5	0–1	1–1	1–3	0–1	2–1	0–4
Merstham	0–1	1–1	1–1	2–2	0–3	1–4	2–2	3–1	6–1	1–0	5–0	2–1	3–4	0–1	0–0	2–1	1–0		2–1	4–1	0–0	5–3	0–2	1–2
Metropolitan Police	1–0	1–1	0–1	2–1	0–4	1–1	3–0	1–0	3–1	0–2	1–1	1–2	1–2	1–0	0–1	2–1	2–2	0–2		2–1	1–6	1–1	2–0	1–2
Needham Market	2–1	1–2	2–2	1–1	3–3	1–1	1–3	2–1	5–1	2–1	2–1	0–0	5–2	2–1	2–1	0–4	2–0	1–1	1–0		1–1	0–2	1–0	2–1
Staines Town	4–0	3–2	0–2	1–2	1–1	2–0	2–2	0–2	3–0	0–2	0–0	1–4	3–2	0–2	2–5	2–3	2–1	3–0	3–2	4–1		1–1	0–1	4–0
Tonbridge Angels	1–0	1–0	4–1	0–0	3–0	0–0	3–0	2–2	4–1	0–3	1–0	1–1	3–1	0–1	4–4	2–2	1–0	2–2	2–1	3–4	1–2		3–0	2–1
Wingate & Finchley	4–1	1–2	0–2	2–1	1–2	0–3	1–5	3–2	1–0	0–0	3–1	0–2	1–0	2–1	2–1	1–0	1–1	3–2	2–3	0–1	1–1	4–0		1–0
Worthing	0–0	2–2	1–1	1–1	5–0	0–1	1–3	3–3	0–1	3–2	0–4	1–2	1–2	0–0	3–2	1–3	0–1	1–0	3–1	4–3	5–3	3–0	1–4	

Updated to match(es) played on 22 April 2017. Source:
Legend: Blue = home team win; Yellow = draw; Red = away team win.

=== Stadia and locations ===
Locations of the Premier Division clubs
Greater London Premier Division football clubs

Club	Stadium	Capacity
AFC Sudbury	King's Marsh	2,500
Billericay Town	New Lodge	3,500
Bognor Regis Town	Nyewood Lane	4,500
Burgess Hill Town	Leylands Park	2,500
Canvey Island	Park Lane	4,500
Dulwich Hamlet	Champion Hill	3,000
Enfield Town	Queen Elizabeth II Stadium	2,500
Folkestone Invicta	Cheriton Road	4,000
Grays Athletic	The Mill Field (groundshare with Aveley)	1,100
Harlow Town	The Harlow Arena	3,500
Harrow Borough	Earlsmead Stadium	3,070
Havant & Waterlooville	West Leigh Park	5,250
Hendon	Silver Jubilee Park	1,990
Kingstonian	Kingsmeadow (groundshare with AFC Wimbledon)	4,850
Leatherhead	Fetcham Grove	3,400
Leiston	Victory Road	2,500
Lowestoft Town	Crown Meadow	3,000
Merstham	Moatside	2,000
Metropolitan Police	Imber Court	3,000
Needham Market	Bloomfields	4,000
Staines Town	Wheatsheaf Park	3,009
Tonbridge Angels	Longmead Stadium	3,000
Wingate & Finchley	The Harry Abrahams Stadium	1,500
Worthing	Woodside Road	4,000

== Division One North ==
Isthmian League Division One North
- Season: 2016–17
- Champions: Brightlingsea Regent
- Promoted: Brightlingsea Regent; Thurrock
- Relegated: Wroxham; Great Wakering Rovers
- Matches: 552
- Goals: 1,766 (3.2 per match)
- Top goalscorer: 34 goals - Liam Nash (Maldon & Tiptree)
- Total attendance: 66,240
- Average attendance: 120 (-9.1% to previous season)

Division One North consisted of 24 clubs: 19 clubs from the previous season, and five new clubs:

- Bowers & Pitsea, promoted from the Essex Senior League
- Brentwood Town, relegated from the Premier Division
- Norwich United, promoted from the Eastern Counties League
- VCD Athletic, relegated from the Premier Division
- Ware, transferred from Southern League Division One Central

Brightlingsea Regent were pronounced champions of Division One North on 8 April 2017, and promoted with play-off Thurrock. Wroxham, who were reprieved from relegation twice in three previous seasons were finally relegated along with Great Wakering Rovers. Ware get a reprieve after Worcester City took a voluntary demotion from National League to Midland League.

=== League table ===
Pos	Team	Pld	W	D	L	GF	GA	GD	Pts	Promotion, qualification or relegation
1	Brightlingsea Regent	46	32	7	7	114	57	+57	103	Promoted to the Premier Division
2	Maldon & Tiptree	46	29	4	13	107	51	+56	91	Qualified for play-offs
3	Thurrock	46	27	8	11	84	39	+45	89	Qualified for play-offs, then promoted to the Premier Division (Note: Four teams play for one spot and promotion to the Premier Division)
4	AFC Hornchurch	46	24	13	9	78	42	+36	85	Qualified for play-offs
5	Haringey Borough	46	24	7	15	107	74	+33	79	Qualified for play-offs
6	Bowers & Pitsea	46	23	9	14	102	66	+36	78	
7	Aveley	46	21	13	12	75	64	+11	76	
8	Norwich United	46	24	6	16	70	60	+10	75 (Note: Norwich United were deducted 3 points for fielding an ineligible player in their win over Bury Town on 11 October.)	
9	Phoenix Sports	46	22	9	15	71	72	−1	75	Transferred to Division One South
10	Cheshunt	46	20	11	15	85	72	+13	71	
11	Bury Town	46	20	9	17	74	66	+8	69	
12	Tilbury	46	17	13	16	67	73	−6	64	
13	Witham Town	46	16	11	19	77	80	−3	59	
14	Brentwood Town	46	17	5	24	63	77	−14	56	
15	VCD Athletic	46	15	11	20	53	76	−23	56	Transferred to Division One South
16	Romford	46	15	11	20	59	90	−31	56	
17	Thamesmead Town	46	16	6	24	70	78	−8	54	Transferred to Division One South
18	Dereham Town	46	15	9	22	70	89	−19	54	
19	Soham Town Rangers	46	14	11	21	62	78	−16	53	
20	Waltham Abbey	46	14	9	23	57	73	−16	51	
21	Heybridge Swifts	46	13	12	21	64	81	−17	51	
22	Ware	46	15	6	25	66	84	−18	51	Reprieved from relegation (Note: Ware finished in a relegation position but were reprieved after Worcester City, already relegated from National League North, took a further voluntary demotion to the Midland League for financial reasons.)
23	Wroxham	46	6	7	33	42	103	−61	25	Relegated to the Eastern Counties League
24	Great Wakering Rovers	46	6	7	33	49	121	−72	25	Relegated to the Essex Senior League

Source: IL official site
Rules for classification: 1) Points; 2) Goal difference; 3) Number of goals scored; 4) Number of matches won; 5) Head-to-head results

==== Top scorers ====
Player	Club	Goals
Liam Nash	Maldon & Tiptree	34
Bradley Warner	Bowers & Pitsea	31
Aaron Condon	Brightlingsea Regent	30
Jason Hallett	Cheshunt	29
Leon McKenzie	AFC Hornchurch	29

==== Play-offs ====
Semifinals
2	Maldon & Tiptree	5
5	Haringey Borough	4
3	Thurrock	1
4	AFC Hornchurch	0

Final
2	Maldon & Tiptree	0
3	Thurrock	1

===== Semi-finals =====
26 April 2017	Maldon & Tiptree	5–4	Haringey Borough	Wallace Binder Ground, Maldon
19:45	Nash 6', 12' (pen.), 20'; Newson 51'; Mills 83'		Richards 14'; Gabriel 49', 76'; Benjamin 90+'	Attendance: 412

26 April 2017	Thurrock	1–0	AFC Hornchurch	Ship Lane, Aveley
19:45	Sutton 12'			Attendance: 481

===== Final =====
30 April 2017	Maldon & Tiptree	0–1	Thurrock	Wallace Binder Ground, Maldon
15:00			Winn 78'	Attendance: 719

=== Results ===
Home \ Away	AFC	AVE	BOP	BRE	BRI	BUR	CHE	DER	GWR	HAY	HEY	M&T	NOR	PHO	ROM	SOH	THA	THU	TIL	VCD	WAL	WAR	WIT	WRO
AFC Hornchurch		3–1	1–4	2–2	2–2	3–2	1–2	0–1	3–0	3–2	0–0	1–1	2–0	4–1	1–0	1–0	3–1	2–0	1–1	0–0	3–0	4–0	1–1	1–1
Aveley	1–0		1–1	3–1	1–4	0–0	1–2	2–0	3–2	2–1	3–0	3–0	2–1	1–1	3–0	2–0	0–2	0–1	2–1	2–2	3–2	5–2	2–2	2–1
Bowers & Pitsea	3–2	0–1		2–0	3–4	4–1	2–3	4–0	5–2	2–1	2–0	0–1	5–0	3–1	5–0	2–2	0–0	2–0	4–0	0–1	1–1	5–0	1–5	1–1
Brentwood Town	0–1	1–2	4–2		1–4	0–1	1–3	3–0	1–2	3–1	1–2	1–2	3–0	0–3	2–1	0–1	2–0	2–1	0–3	2–1	3–2	0–1	1–0	2–0
Brightlingsea Regent	2–1	3–1	1–1	2–2		1–0	2–2	3–1	2–1	1–0	2–1	1–0	3–1	3–4	4–1	3–1	4–3	0–1	2–3	2–0	2–1	5–0	4–1	3–0
Bury Town	0–2	1–0	3–0	3–1	4–1		2–1	2–1	1–1	2–1	1–2	3–2	2–3	1–2	1–2	1–1	2–0	2–0	2–1	1–2	2–1	2–2	1–3	6–1
Cheshunt	2–2	1–2	0–1	1–0	2–2	3–1		2–3	3–1	1–1	3–1	3–1	2–3	1–2	2–1	0–4	1–3	0–1	0–0	0–0	0–2	2–0	2–0	3–1
Dereham Town	0–0	2–2	1–3	1–3	3–2	0–1	3–3		3–0	1–2	3–0	0–5	1–1	3–4	2–3	2–0	2–3	1–3	2–3	0–0	2–1	1–0	0–2	2–1
Great Wakering Rovers	2–5	2–4	1–5	1–3	1–2	1–4	1–4	0–5		1–4	0–5	0–3	1–3	1–2	1–1	2–2	2–1	0–5	2–1	0–1	3–3	0–5	1–3	2–3
Haringey Borough	0–2	4–5	5–4	3–2	2–3	3–0	3–5	3–0	5–2		3–2	3–1	2–1	4–0	7–1	6–0	3–2	1–2	3–2	0–2	3–1	4–1	2–2	1–0
Heybridge Swifts	0–3	1–1	2–2	1–1	2–2	2–2	3–1	1–3	2–1	1–4		1–0	0–1	3–2	0–1	1–4	3–0	0–5	0–1	1–2	2–2	2–1	3–1	2–1
Maldon & Tiptree	3–0	3–1	2–3	0–1	2–1	3–0	4–1	2–2	2–0	2–0	2–1		3–0	6–1	5–1	1–0	2–1	4–0	3–0	3–0	2–1	4–1	4–2	3–0
Norwich United	0–1	1–0	1–1	4–0	4–1	3–0	2–2	2–0	1–1	2–1	2–2	2–0		0–1	4–1	2–1	2–1	0–2	1–2	4–1	0–1	2–1	2–0	2–0
Phoenix Sports	1–1	6–2	1–0	0–3	0–3	0–3	1–1	4–1	3–2	0–3	3–0	1–0	0–1		1–3	1–2	0–2	1–1	2–2	4–0	2–1	1–1	1–1	2–0
Romford	0–0	0–0	1–2	2–2	1–4	1–0	0–3	2–2	2–1	1–1	3–3	2–6	3–0	1–1		1–4	1–1	2–3	1–0	1–0	1–0	2–2	2–1	4–1
Soham Town Rangers	1–0	0–1	2–0	3–1	2–2	1–4	0–4	1–3	1–2	1–3	0–2	4–3	4–0	0–1	1–1		1–3	2–1	1–1	5–2	1–1	1–3	0–0	1–1
Thamesmead Town	0–3	3–3	2–1	1–2	0–1	1–1	0–5	5–2	1–0	1–1	2–1	0–1	1–2	0–1	1–2	1–2		0–1	0–1	2–2	0–1	2–1	4–2	4–1
Thurrock	2–0	2–2	3–1	5–1	0–1	4–0	0–1	3–1	3–0	1–1	0–0	0–0	0–1	4–0	2–0	3–1	1–2		6–1	4–0	1–0	2–1	2–0	1–0
Tilbury	0–0	0–0	1–1	2–0	1–2	1–1	2–0	2–1	1–1	1–1	1–1	3–2	1–2	0–2	2–1	4–1	1–5	1–1		5–2	2–1	1–3	2–1	1–1
VCD Athletic	0–2	0–0	0–2	1–1	0–5	0–0	3–0	1–2	0–0	5–2	1–0	3–1	0–3	0–2	2–3	2–0	2–3	2–1	3–1		4–1	2–0	0–3	4–3
Waltham Abbey	0–1	1–0	1–4	1–0	0–3	1–0	3–3	3–3	3–1	0–2	1–0	1–4	1–0	1–2	1–0	0–0	0–1	1–1	2–4	0–0		2–1	1–3	3–1
Ware	0–2	2–0	2–3	2–0	0–3	2–2	4–1	0–1	1–0	2–3	0–3	1–2	2–3	2–2	3–0	3–0	3–1	0–1	2–0	0–0	0–2		2–1	3–1
Witham Town	1–5	2–2	5–2	4–1	0–5	2–3	2–2	1–2	0–1	1–2	5–3	1–1	2–1	0–1	2–0	1–1	3–2	2–2	2–1	1–0	2–1	2–1		1–2
Wroxham	2–3	0–1	0–3	0–3	0–2	0–3	0–2	1–1	1–3	0–1	2–2	0–6	1–0	1–0	1–2	0–2	3–2	0–2	2–3	4–0	0–4	2–3	1–1	

Updated to match(es) played on 22 April 2017. Source:
Legend: Blue = home team win; Yellow = draw; Red = away team win.

=== Stadia and locations ===
Locations of Division One North clubs
Greater London Division One North clubs

Club	Stadium	Capacity
AFC Hornchurch	Hornchurch Stadium	3,500
Aveley	The Mill Field	1,100
Bowers & Pitsea	Crown Avenue	2,000
Brentwood Town	The Brentwood Centre Arena	1,800
Brightlingsea Regent	North Road	1,000
Bury Town	Ram Meadow	3,500
Cheshunt	Cheshunt Stadium	3,000
Dereham Town	Aldiss Park	3,000
Great Wakering Rovers	Burroughs Park	2,500
Haringey Borough	Coles Park	1,500
Heybridge Swifts	Scraley Road	3,000
Maldon & Tiptree	Wallace Binder Ground	2,000
Norwich United	Plantation Park	3,000
Phoenix Sports	Victory Road	2,000
Romford	Ship Lane (groundshare with Thurrock)	3,500
Soham Town Rangers	Julius Martin Lane	2,000
Thamesmead Town	Bayliss Avenue	6,000
Thurrock	Ship Lane	3,500
Tilbury	Chadfields	4,000
VCD Athletic	Oakwood	1,180
Waltham Abbey	Capershotts	3,500
Ware	Wodson Park	3,300
Witham Town	Spa Road	2,500
Wroxham	Trafford Park	2,000

== Division One South ==
Isthmian League Division One South
- Season: 2016–17
- Champions: Tooting & Mitcham United
- Promoted: Tooting & Mitcham United; Dorking Wanderers
- Relegated: Chatham Town; Three Bridges; Godalming Town
- Matches: 552
- Goals: 2,029 (3.68 per match)
- Top goalscorer: 33 goals - Shaun Okojie (Corinthian-Casuals)
- Total attendance: 111,438
- Average attendance: 202 (-1.4% to previous season)

Division One South consisted of 24 clubs: 19 clubs from the previous season, and five new clubs:

- Cray Wanderers, transferred from Division One North
- Godalming Town, transferred from Southern Football League Division One Central
- Greenwich Borough, promoted from Southern Counties East League
- Horsham, promoted from the Southern Combination League
- Lewes, relegated from the Premier Division

Tooting & Mitcham United were pronounced champions of Division One South on 22 April 2017, and returned to the Premier Division after five seasons in Division One South along with play-off winners Dorking Wanderers who reached this level for the first time in their history.

=== League table ===
Pos	Team	Pld	W	D	L	GF	GA	GD	Pts	Promotion, qualification or relegation
1	Tooting & Mitcham United	46	33	6	7	120	54	+66	105	Promoted to the Premier Division
2	Dorking Wanderers	46	33	6	7	103	44	+59	105	Qualified for play-offs, then promoted to the Premier Division (Note: Four teams play for one spot and promotion to the Premier Division)
3	Greenwich Borough	46	30	5	11	102	52	+50	95	Qualified for play-offs
4	Corinthian-Casuals	46	29	6	11	99	59	+40	93	Qualified for play-offs
5	Hastings United	46	23	13	10	128	64	+64	82	Qualified for play-offs
6	Carshalton Athletic	46	24	9	13	106	69	+37	81	
7	Hythe Town	46	23	9	14	87	65	+22	78	
8	South Park	46	24	4	18	95	80	+15	76	
9	Lewes	46	23	7	16	88	75	+13	76	
10	Faversham Town	46	22	8	16	89	58	+31	74	
11	Cray Wanderers	46	19	11	16	88	86	+2	68	
12	Ramsgate	46	18	11	17	79	75	+4	65	
13	Walton Casuals	46	19	8	19	98	99	−1	65	
14	Whyteleafe	46	19	7	20	81	75	+6	64	
15	Sittingbourne	46	17	11	18	71	86	−15	62	
16	Horsham	46	17	10	19	79	80	−1	61	
17	Herne Bay	46	13	12	21	74	98	−24	51	
18	East Grinstead Town	46	14	5	27	82	121	−39	47	
19	Molesey	46	11	10	25	61	116	−55	43	
20	Chipstead	46	11	8	27	68	99	−31	41	
21	Guernsey	46	9	11	26	66	112	−46	38	
22	Chatham Town	46	7	10	29	57	120	−63	31	Relegated to the Southern Counties East League
23	Three Bridges	46	7	8	31	59	114	−55	29	Relegated to the Southern Combination League
24	Godalming Town	46	8	3	35	49	128	−79	24 (Note: Godalming Town were deducted 3 points for fielding an ineligible player in their win over Herne Bay on 15 October.)	Relegated to the Combined Counties League

Source: IL official site
Rules for classification: 1) Points; 2) Goal difference; 3) Number of goals scored; 4) Number of matches won; 5) Head-to-head results

==== Top scorers ====
Player	Club	Goals
Shaun Okojie	Corinthian-Casuals	33
Kieran Lavery	South Park	32
Tommy Bradford	Carshalton Athletic	29
Francis Collin	Hastings United	28
Charlie MacDonald	Greenwich Borough	27

==== Play-offs ====
Semifinals
2	Dorking Wanderers (a.e.t.)	1 (4)
5	Hastings United	1 (3)
3	Greenwich Borough	3
4	Corinthian-Casuals	4

Final
2	Dorking Wanderers (a.e.t.)	0 (5)
4	Corinthian-Casuals	0 (4)

===== Semi-finals =====
25 April 2017	Dorking Wanderers	1–1 (a.e.t.) (4–3 p)	Hastings United	Westhumble Playing Fields, Dorking
19:45	McShane 86'		Collin 73'

25 April 2017	Greenwich Borough	3–4	Corinthian-Casuals	Badgers Sports Ground, Eltham
19:45	Eisa 4'; Sweeney 34'; Wilson 83'		Okojie 18' (pen.), 76'; Dillon 23'; Maan 59'	Attendance: 427

===== Final =====
29 April 2017	Dorking Wanderers	0–0 (a.e.t.) (5–4 p)	Corinthian-Casuals	Westhumble Playing Fields, Dorking
15:00				Attendance: 967

=== Results ===
Home \ Away	CAR	CHA	CHI	COR	CRA	DOW	EGT	FAV	GOD	GRE	GUE	HAS	HER	HOR	HYT	LEW	MOL	RAM	SIT	SPK	THR	T&M	WAL	WHY
Carshalton Athletic		6–1	2–3	1–3	2–1	3–3	3–1	2–1	10–0	1–3	2–1	4–4	4–1	5–1	0–3	4–3	3–0	1–1	2–2	1–0	5–1	1–1	5–0	2–0
Chatham Town	1–2		4–4	1–4	1–3	0–3	2–3	0–1	0–1	0–3	1–4	0–7	3–2	1–4	1–3	0–0	0–2	5–2	2–3	0–1	1–1	2–3	1–4	2–3
Chipstead	3–1	0–1		1–4	2–2	1–3	1–3	0–1	2–0	1–2	1–3	3–3	2–2	2–1	1–2	1–2	0–1	1–2	2–2	1–3	3–0	0–7	4–1	1–2
Corinthian-Casuals	0–2	2–2	1–0		1–1	2–0	2–0	0–0	5–1	2–0	5–2	0–1	2–1	2–1	3–6	0–2	5–1	1–0	4–0	0–1	2–0	3–3	0–0	2–1
Cray Wanderers	4–1	3–0	3–2	3–4		0–2	2–4	1–0	5–1	0–0	1–0	1–4	2–1	2–2	0–1	1–3	3–0	2–2	3–3	0–3	3–2	1–4	3–4	2–2
Dorking Wanderers	2–1	1–2	4–1	1–0	2–1		1–2	1–0	2–0	1–0	5–2	2–1	3–4	7–1	1–0	2–1	6–0	3–0	3–0	3–0	0–1	1–0	1–0	2–2
East Grinstead Town	0–3	2–2	4–3	2–2	4–2	2–3		2–1	3–4	0–5	0–1	4–4	2–3	0–3	2–3	1–3	3–0	1–4	2–0	5–3	1–2	1–4	1–1	2–7
Faversham Town	2–0	7–1	4–1	3–0	2–2	1–2	3–0		3–2	2–5	1–0	1–1	6–3	1–1	1–2	5–0	1–0	2–0	1–1	2–2	4–1	0–3	5–1	2–1
Godalming Town	0–3	2–4	1–4	1–2	0–1	0–5	2–3	0–2		1–4	3–0	1–0	3–2	1–2	0–1	1–0	1–2	2–1	1–2	1–4	1–3	0–3	1–6	3–4
Greenwich Borough	0–2	3–0	1–2	0–3	3–1	1–1	3–0	3–2	2–0		4–0	3–2	2–0	4–1	1–0	1–0	2–1	3–1	1–3	1–3	4–2	3–2	2–1	0–1
Guernsey	2–2	2–2	2–0	1–4	0–0	2–4	2–1	2–4	1–1	1–1		0–1	5–1	2–3	2–2	2–4	2–0	0–3	2–1	1–3	1–1	0–6	4–1	1–2
Hastings United	5–0	2–2	3–3	3–4	1–2	2–4	2–0	1–0	3–0	3–0	6–1		7–0	3–0	2–1	3–0	5–1	1–2	1–1	4–1	3–2	0–1	1–1	4–0
Herne Bay	2–3	2–1	3–0	1–0	0–1	0–0	6–0	1–2	3–2	0–5	1–1	1–1		0–1	0–2	1–4	2–0	2–2	3–0	1–1	1–1	1–4	1–1	2–1
Horsham	1–3	4–0	3–2	2–0	2–3	2–0	1–1	4–3	8–1	1–2	0–0	1–1	0–2		0–1	3–0	1–3	1–2	0–1	0–2	2–0	2–0	1–1	1–1
Hythe Town	2–2	6–1	1–1	0–5	2–3	0–1	3–1	1–1	2–0	2–2	8–1	1–1	3–1	3–3		4–0	1–0	1–0	2–1	1–2	1–1	0–4	6–1	1–1
Lewes	1–2	2–0	2–1	2–3	5–2	1–2	4–0	0–0	3–0	2–4	1–0	4–4	3–1	1–2	1–0		2–2	3–2	2–2	1–3	4–2	1–5	0–2	2–1
Molesey	1–1	1–0	1–1	0–1	2–2	1–3	2–0	1–4	2–2	1–2	3–3	5–4	3–3	3–3	3–1	0–4		2–3	1–1	1–3	2–2	2–1	2–2	2–1
Ramsgate	1–2	2–1	0–1	3–4	2–2	2–2	4–2	1–0	1–0	1–3	2–1	1–1	0–2	1–0	3–0	1–1	5–1		1–2	1–1	2–0	1–1	0–2	5–2
Sittingbourne	1–0	2–2	0–1	2–1	0–4	0–1	1–0	2–1	2–1	1–5	3–3	2–4	2–2	3–2	4–0	1–3	2–0	4–0		2–0	4–4	1–3	3–2	0–3
South Park	3–2	3–0	1–1	2–3	1–4	0–2	2–4	3–1	6–2	0–4	3–0	1–5	3–1	1–3	0–1	0–3	6–2	1–3	2–0		1–0	3–4	5–1	1–2
Three Bridges	1–4	0–0	1–3	2–3	0–4	0–3	2–4	1–3	1–1	1–4	4–3	0–4	2–3	1–2	1–4	3–5	2–1	0–2	0–1	0–4		3–5	2–4	4–0
Tooting & Mitcham United	1–0	4–3	3–1	3–1	4–0	2–1	5–2	1–0	1–0	1–0	2–2	0–4	1–1	2–1	0–2	0–0	8–2	3–2	2–0	2–0	1–0		2–0	2–1
Walton Casuals	1–0	1–2	4–1	0–3	5–1	1–2	3–7	0–2	2–3	1–0	4–2	3–2	4–4	3–0	3–1	1–2	7–0	3–3	3–2	3–5	1–0	4–3		1–3
Whyteleafe	1–1	0–1	3–0	0–1	0–1	2–2	2–0	2–1	3–1	1–1	5–1	0–4	3–0	3–1	3–0	0–1	4–1	1–2	4–1	1–2	0–2	1–3	1–4	

Updated to match(es) played on 22 April 2017. Source:
Legend: Blue = home team win; Yellow = draw; Red = away team win.

=== Stadia and locations ===
Locations of Division One South teams
Greater London Division One South teams

Club	Stadium	Capacity
Carshalton Athletic	War Memorial Sports Ground	5,000
Chatham Town	The Sports Ground	5,000
Chipstead	High Road	2,000
Corinthian-Casuals	King George's Field	2,700
Cray Wanderers	Hayes Lane (groundshare with Bromley)	6,000
Dorking Wanderers	Westhumble Community Ground	1,500
East Grinstead Town	East Court	1,000
Faversham Town	Shepherd Neame Stadium	2,000
Godalming Town	Weycourt	3,000
Greenwich Borough	Badgers Sports Ground (groundshare with Cray Valley PM)	1,500
Guernsey	Footes Lane	5,000
Hastings United	The Pilot Field	4,050
Herne Bay	Winch's Field	4,000
Horsham	Gorings Mead	1,500
Hythe Town	Reachfields Stadium	3,000
Lewes	The Dripping Pan	3,000
Molesey	Walton Road Stadium	1,000
Ramsgate	Southwood Stadium	2,500
Sittingbourne	Woodstock Park	3,000
South Park	King George's Field	2,000
Three Bridges	Jubilee Field	1,500
Tooting & Mitcham United	Imperial Fields	3,500
Walton Casuals	Church Road (groundshare with Whyteleafe)	2,000
Whyteleafe	Church Road	2,000

== League Cup ==
2016–17 Alan Turvey Trophy
Tournament details
- Country: England
- Teams: 62

Final positions
- Champions: Billericay Town
- Runners-up: Tonbridge Angels

Tournament statistics
- Matches played: 61

The 2016–17 Alan Turvey Trophy sponsored by Robert Dyas (formerly the Isthmian League Cup) is the 43rd season of the Alan Turvey Trophy, the cup competition of the whole Isthmian League.

=== Calendar ===
Round	Dates	Matches	Clubs
First round	5 September to 12 September	30	62 → 32
Second round	4 October to 13 December	16	32 → 16
Third round	6 December to 31 January	8	16 → 8
Quarterfinals	10 January to 14 February	4	8 → 4
Semifinals	21 February to 14 March	2	4 → 2
Final	12 April	1	2 → 1

The Isthmian League Cup was voluntary this season, ten clubs decided not to take part in the competition:

- Bognor Regis Town
- Cray Wanderers
- Dereham Town
- Havant & Waterlooville
- Guernsey
- Lewes
- Norwich United
- Phoenix Sports
- Thurrock
- Wroxham

=== First round ===
Sixty clubs participated in the First round, while two clubs received a bye to the Second round:

- Bury Town
- Dorking Wanderers

Tie	Home team (tier)	Score	Away team (tier)	Att.
1	Aveley (N)	1–2	Greenwich Borough (S)	44
2	Carshalton Athletic (S)	1–0	Molesey (S)	99
3	Chatham Town (S)	1–0	VCD Athletic (N)	61
4	Kingstonian (P)	2–2	Merstham (P)	124
Merstham advance 5–4 on penalties
5	Burgess Hill Town (P)	1–0	Horsham (S)	133
6	East Grinstead Town (S)	2–2	Godalming Town (S)	62
Godalming Town advance 6–5 on penalties
7	AFC Sudbury (P)	2–1	Lowestoft Town (P)	125
8	Billericay Town (P)	3–0	Heybridge Swifts (N)	117
9	Brightlingsea Regent (N)	6–3	Leiston (P)	62
10	Canvey Island (P)	6–1	Great Wakering Rovers (N)	90
11	Cheshunt (N)	2–4	Enfield Town (P)	231
12	Dulwich Hamlet (P)	4–0	Grays Athletic (P)	374
13	Folkestone Invicta (P)	0–1	Tonbridge Angels (P)	224
14	Harrow Borough (P)	4–4	Wingate & Finchley (P)	85
Wingate & Finchley advance 8–7 on penalties But later Wingate & Finchley removed, Harrow Borough reinstalled
15	Soham Town Rangers (N)	3–4	Needham Market (P)	103

Tie	Home team (tier)	Score	Away team (tier)	Att.
16	Tooting & Mitcham United (S)	0–3	Staines Town (P)	111
17	Waltham Abbey (N)	3–1	Harlow Town (P)	91
18	Worthing (P)	5–0	Three Bridges (S)	227
19	Hendon (P)	2–2	Metropolitan Police (P)	76
Metropolitan Police advance 4–3 on penalties
20	Brentwood Town (N)	1–2	Ware (N)	45
21	Tilbury (N)	0–0	Maldon & Tiptree (N)	51
Tilbury advance 8–7 on penalties
22	AFC Hornchurch (N)	4–1	Haringey Borough (N)	71
23	Bowers & Pitsea (N)	3–0	Witham Town (N)	75
24	Chipstead (S)	1–2	South Park (S)	53
25	Corinthian-Casuals (S)	2–0	Whyteleafe (S)	74
26	Faversham Town (S)	3–0	Hythe Town (S)	128
27	Herne Bay (S)	1–1	Hastings United (S)	145
Hastings United advance 4–3 on penalties
28	Sittingbourne (S)	2–1	Ramsgate (S)	88
29	Thamesmead Town (N)	4–3	Romford (N)	47
Thamesmead Town removed, Romford reinstalled
30	Leatherhead (P)	2–1	Walton Casuals (N)	65

=== Second round ===
Thirty clubs to have made it through the First round were entered into the draw with two clubs who get a bye, making thirty-two teams.

Tie	Home team (tier)	Score	Away team (tier)	Att.
31	Waltham Abbey (N)	2–5	AFC Sudbury (P)	62
32	Tilbury (N)	1–1	Billericay Town (P)	112
Billericay Town advance 4–2 on penalties
33	Canvey Island (P)	0–0	Ware (N)	151
Ware advance 3–1 on penalties
34	Staines Town (P)	3–4	Harrow Borough (P)	123
35	Tonbridge Angels (P)	2–0	Sittingbourne (S)	260
36	Romford (N)	1–0	Chatham Town (S)	65
37	Enfield Town (P)	1–4	AFC Hornchurch (N)	120
38	Greenwich Borough (S)	1–2	Dulwich Hamlet (P)	213

Tie	Home team (tier)	Score	Away team (tier)	Att.
39	Merstham (P)	4–3	Leatherhead (P)	154
40	Burgess Hill Town (P)	2–3	Godalming Town (S)	148
Godalming Town removed, Burgess Hill Town reinstalled
41	Bury Town (N)	0–2	Needham Market (P)	230
42	Faversham Town (S)	1–1	Hastings United (S)	101
Faversham Town advance 6–5 on penalties
43	Metropolitan Police (P)	0–1	Corinthian-Casuals (S)	103
44	South Park (S)	2–1	Carshalton Athletic (S)	72
45	Worthing (P)	2–1	Dorking Wanderers (S)	280
46	Brightlingsea Regent (N)	2–1	Bowers & Pitsea (N)	54

=== Third round ===
Tie	Home team (tier)	Score	Away team (tier)	Att.
47	Tonbridge Angels (P)	2–2	Romford (N)	133
Tonbridge Angels advance 4–2 on penalties
48	AFC Hornchurch (N)	1–0	AFC Sudbury (P)	76
49	Corinthian-Casuals (S)	2–5	Merstham (P)	81
50	Ware (N)	1–2	Needham Market (P)	60

Tie	Home team (tier)	Score	Away team (tier)	Att.
51	Worthing (P)	2–1	Burgess Hill Town (P)	444
52	Billericay Town (P)	2–1	Brightlingsea Regent (N)	126
53	Dulwich Hamlet (P)	2–1	Faversham Town (S)	321
54	Harrow Borough (P)	0–4	South Park (S)	53

=== Quarterfinals ===
Tie	Home team (tier)	Score	Away team (tier)	Att.
55	Needham Market (P)	1–3	Tonbridge Angels (P)	148
56	Worthing (P)	0–7	Billericay Town (P)	318

Tie	Home team (tier)	Score	Away team (tier)	Att.
57	Merstham (P)	1–1	South Park (S)	110
South Park advance 4–3 on penalties
58	AFC Hornchurch (N)	2–3	Dulwich Hamlet (P)	146

=== Semifinals ===
Tie	Home team (tier)	Score	Away team (tier)	Att.
59	Billericay Town (P)	4–3	South Park (S)	275
60	Tonbridge Angels (P)	3–1	Dulwich Hamlet (P)	305

=== Final ===
12 April 2017 61	Billericay Town (P)	8–3	Tonbridge Angels (P)	Colston Avenue, Carshalton
19:30	Robinson 12'; Bricknell 29', 36', 44'; Cunnington 48', 61'; Lawrence 55'; Krasniqi 83'	Isthmian League report	McCollin 5', 89'; Konchesky 49' (o.g.)	Attendance: 653

== See also ==
- Isthmian League
- 2016–17 Northern Premier League
- 2016–17 Southern Football League
