= Haringey Borough F.C. =

Association football club in London, England

Coordinates: 51°36′20″N 0°05′34″W

Haringey Borough
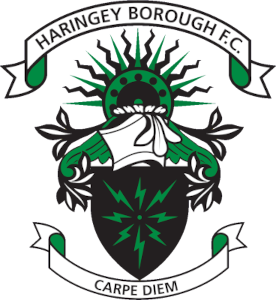
- Full name: Haringey Borough Football Club
- Nickname: The Borough
- Founded: 1973
- Ground: Coles Park, Tottenham
- Capacity: 2,500 (280 seated)
- Chairman: Aki Achillea
- Manager: Tom Loizou
- League: Southern League Division One Central
- 2025–26: Spartan South Midlands League Premier Division, 1st of 20 (promoted)
- Website: http://www.haringeyboroughfc.net
Home colours	Away colours

Haringey Borough Football Club is a football club based in Tottenham in the London Borough of Haringey, England. Established in 1973 by a merger of Edmonton and Wood Green Town (themselves founded in 1907 and 1911 respectively), they are currently members of the Southern League Division One Central and play at Coles Park.

== History ==
The club was established in 1973 by a merger of Edmonton and Haringey Borough (formerly Wood Green Town), and was initially named Edmonton & Haringey. The new club took Edmonton's place in Division One of the Athenian League, and adopted their current name after finishing bottom of the division in 1975–76. The league was reduced to a single division in 1977 and the club finished bottom of the league in 1981–82.

When the Athenian League was disbanded at the end of the 1983–84 season, Haringey joined Division Two North of the Isthmian League. With many of the players and the management team leaving shortly before the start of the 1988–89 season, the club dropped out of the league, before joining the Premier Division of the Spartan League for the 1989–90 season. In 1990–91 the club won the London Senior Cup. In 1995 they were renamed Tufnell Park, taking the name of one of the clubs that had merged to form Edmonton, but reverted to the Haringey Borough name the following year. When the Spartan League merged with the South Midlands League in 1997 to form the Spartan South Midlands League, the club were placed in Premier Division South for the 1997–98 season; a seventh-place finish saw them placed in the Premier Division for the following season.

Haringey were relegated to Division One at the end of the 2006–07 season, which had seen them finish bottom of the Premier Division. However, they were Division One runners-up the following season, earning an immediate promotion back to the Premier Division; the season also saw them win the Division One Cup. In 2011–12 the club won the league's Challenge Trophy. At the end of the season they were transferred to the Essex Senior League, where their Coles Park tenants Greenhouse London also played. The 2014–15 season saw the club win the Essex Senior League, earning promotion to Division One North of the Isthmian League.

In 2016–17 Haringey finished fifth in Division One North, qualifying for the promotion play-offs. However, they lost 5–4 to Maldon & Tiptree in the semi-finals. The club finished fourth in the division the following season, and after beating Heybridge Swifts 2–0 in the semi-finals, they won the final 3–1 against Canvey Island to secure promotion to the Premier Division. The 2018–19 season saw the club reach the first round of the FA Cup for the first time, going on to lose 1–0 at home to AFC Wimbledon. In 2023–24 the club finished third-from-bottom of the Premier Division and were relegated to the North Division. The following season saw them finish fourth-from-bottom of the North Division, resulting in relegation to the Premier Division of the Spartan South Midlands League.

== Ground ==
The club have played at Coles Park since their establishment; the ground had been home to Wood Green Town since 1930. The ground currently has a capacity of 2,500, of which 280 is seated. A new record attendance was set on 16 December 2017 when a crowd of 1,133 saw Haringey lose 2–1 to Leyton Orient in their first appearance in the first round of the FA Trophy. This was bettered on 9 November 2018 for the FA Cup first round match with AFC Wimbledon, which had an attendance of 2,710. On 23 March 2019, a record league attendance of 875 was set for a 3–1 win over local rivals Enfield Town.

The ground was one of the venues used for the 2018 ConIFA World Football Cup. Prior to the 2018–19 season, Hashtag United began groundsharing at Coles Park.

== Honours ==
- Essex Senior League
  - Champions 2014–15
- Spartan South Midlands League
  - Premier Division champions 2025–26
  - Challenge Trophy winners 2011–12
  - Division One Cup winners 2007–08
- London Senior Cup
  - Winners 1990–91

== Records ==
- Best FA Cup performance: First round, 2018–19
- Best FA Trophy performance: First round, 2017–18
- Best FA Vase performance: Quarter-finals, 1977–78
- Record attendance: 2,710 vs AFC Wimbledon, FA Cup first round, 9 November 2018

== Women's team ==
The club's women's team was established in 1999, joining the Eastern Region Women's League. They were Division Two runners-up and then Division One runners-up, earning promotion to the Premier Division. Although the team were relegated to Division One South at the end of the 2011–12 season, they were promoted back to the Premier Division at the first attempt. They were league champions and league cup winners in 2016–17 and were promoted to the FA Women's National League. However, the following season saw them lose every league match, resulting in relegation back to the Eastern Region Women's League. The women's team currently competes in the Eastern Region Women's League in the Premier Division (Tier 5 of English football). Notable players include 16 year old Emma Roberts represented by FIFA agent Russell Dutton of Beeston Sports and Caitlen-Star Dolan Boodram, a forward from London and three-time English national champion currently studying at East Carolina University, nominated as American Athletic Conference Freshman of the Week.

=== Records ===
- Best Women's FA Cup performance: Second round, 2009–10, 2023–24

=== Honours ===
- Eastern Region Women's League
  - Premier Division champions 2016–17
  - League Cup winners 2016–17
  - League Plate winners 2001–02

== See also ==
- Football in London
- Haringey Borough F.C. players
- Haringey Borough F.C. managers
