= Enfield Town F.C. =

Association football club in London, England

Enfield Town
- Full name: Enfield Town Football Club
- Nickname: Towners
- Founded: 23 June 2001
- Ground: Queen Elizabeth II Stadium, Enfield
- Capacity: 2,500
- Owner: Enfield Town Supporters' Society Ltd
- Chairman: Paul Reed
- Manager: Billy Holland
- League: Isthmian League Premier Division
- 2025–26: National League South, 23rd of 24 (relegated)
- Website: etfc.london
Home colours	Away colours	Third colours

Enfield Town Football Club is a football club based in Enfield, Greater London, England. Established in 2001 as a fan-led breakaway from Enfield, the club are currently members of the Isthmian League Premier Division and play at the Queen Elizabeth II Stadium. The club badge features the Enfield beast.

== History ==
The club was founded on 23 June 2001 by the Enfield Supporters' Trust after Trust members considered that the regime in charge of Enfield no longer had the interests of the club at heart and lacked sufficient will to bring about the return of the club to its home town, having left Southbury Road in 1999. This followed the chairman of Enfield withdrawing from an outline agreement with the Supporters' Trust which would have seen the Trust take over the running of a debt-free club and receiving £100,000 from money from the sale of Southbury Road which was held in an escrow account by Enfield Council. The balance of over £600,000 would have been paid to the chairman.

The newly formed club were admitted to the Essex Senior League for the 2001–02 season, three divisions below the Isthmian League Premier Division where Enfield continued to play. The club's first season saw them finish second in the league and win the League Cup, the Capital Counties Feeder Leagues Trophy, and the Middlesex Senior Charity Cup. The following season they won the Essex Senior League, but were not promoted due to ground grading issues. Despite only finishing fourth in the 2003–04 season, in May 2004 the Isthmian League invited the club to join Division Two, but later rescinded the offer. They won the Essex Senior League for a second time in 2004–05, and were promoted to Division One East of the Southern League, which Enfield were also members of. They finished third in their first season in the Southern League, qualifying for the play-offs, where they were beaten 3–1 after extra time in the semi-finals by Wivenhoe Town.

In the summer of 2006 Enfield were transferred to Division One North of the Isthmian League. The 2006–07 season saw them finish third again, but they lost 4–2 to AFC Sudbury in the play-off semi-finals. At the end of the season Enfield were liquidated and Enfield Town chairman Paul Millington released a statement suggesting that the two clubs should merge and "return the name of Enfield to the top of the non-league world". However, the Enfield players, officials and supporters rejected the offer and formed a brand new club named Enfield 1893. Enfield Town qualified for the play-offs again in 2009–10 after finishing fourth. However, after beating Wingate & Finchley 3–2 in the semi-finals, they lost 3–1 in the final to Concord Rangers. In 2011–12 they were runners-up in the division and went on to win the play-offs, beating Grays Athletic 3–1 on penalties (after a 2–2 draw) in the semi-finals and then defeating Needham Market 1–0 in the final, earning promotion to the Premier Division.

At the start of the 2012–13 season Enfield won the Supporters Direct Cup, defeating Wrexham 3–1. They retained it the following season, beating YB SK Beveren of Belgium 8–2. In 2016–17 they finished fourth in the Isthmian League Premier Division before losing 4–2 to Dulwich Hamlet in the play-off semi-finals. The 2018–19 season saw the club win the Isthmian League's League Cup, beating AFC Hornchurch 2–0 in the final. In 2021–22 they finished third in the Premier Division before losing 3–2 to Hornchurch in the play-off semi-finals. The club finished third again the following season, this time beating Wingate & Finchley 1–0 in the play-off semi-finals before defeating Chatham Town 3–0 in the final to earn promotion to the National League South.

In 2025–26 Enfield finished second-from-bottom of the National League South, resulting in relegation back to the Premier Division of the Isthmian League.

== Ground ==
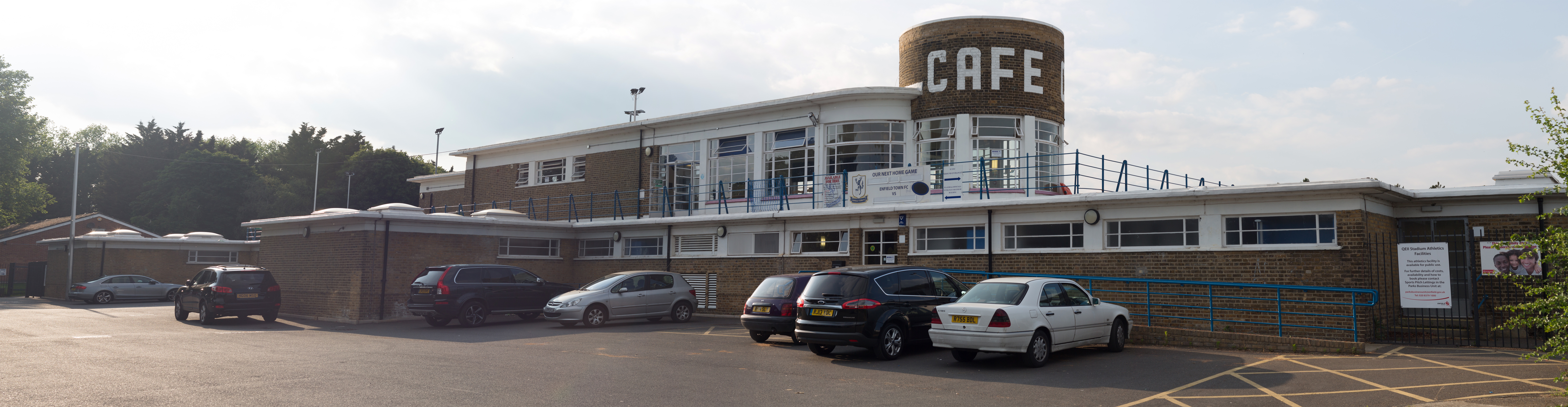
Outside of Queen Elizabeth II Stadium in 2017

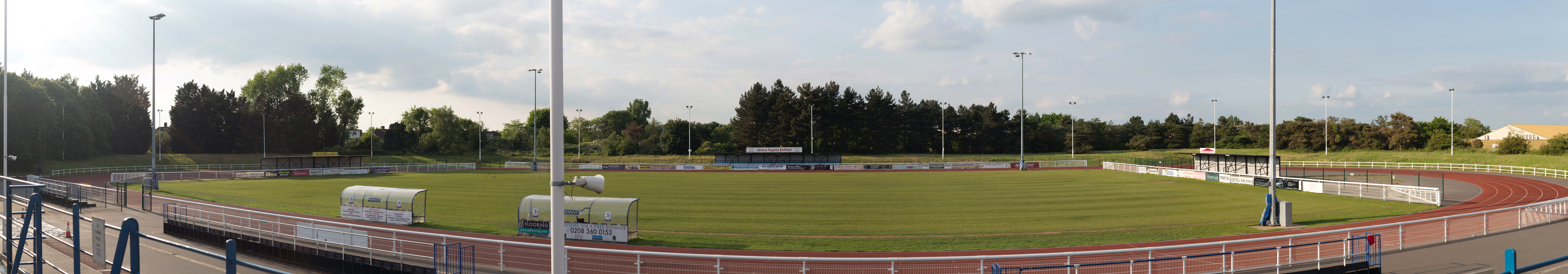
Pitch of Queen Elizabeth II Stadium during the 2017 off-season

The club originally played at Brimsdown Rovers' Goldsdown Road ground, and were later joined by Enfield 1893. In October 2008, Enfield Council announced a deal with the club allowing the club to relocate to the Queen Elizabeth Stadium, close to Enfield's old Southbury Road ground. At the end of the 2009–10 season the club was awarded a grant of £81,504 by the Football Stadium Improvement Fund towards the first phase of works on the new ground.

They left Goldsdown Road at the end of the 2010–11 season, taking with them much of the ground's infrastructure, which resulted in Enfield 1893, who had won the Essex Senior League, not being able to take promotion to the Isthmian League as the ground no longer met the league's standards. After spending the first few months of the 2011–12 season groundsharing at the Cheshunt Stadium in Cheshunt, they moved into the Queen Elizabeth II Stadium in November 2011, with the first match being a victory against Harefield United in the Middlesex Senior Cup on 9 November. The ground was officially opened with a friendly match against Tottenham Hotspur on 16 November, a game which saw a then-record attendance of 969.

== Club officials ==
Position	Name
Chairman	Paul Reed
Vice Chairman	Paul Millington
Manager	Billy Holland
Assistant Manager	Jon Nurse
First Team Coach	Steve Conroy
Goalkeeping Coach	Dean Hurlow
Source: Enfield Town

=== Managerial history ===
Manager	Period	G	W	D	L	Win %	Honours
(England) Jim Chandler	2001–08	354	215	58	81	60.7	Essex Senior League 2002–03, 2004–05; Essex Senior League Cup 2001–02, 2003–04; Cherry Red Books Trophy 2001–02; Middlesex Charity Cup 2001–02, 2007–08; Gordon Brasted Memorial Trophy 2002–03
(England) Stewart Margolis	2008–09	59	24	10	25	40.7	
(England) Steve Newing	2009–13	235	116	33	86	49.4	George Ruffell Memorial Trophy 2009–10
(England) Bryan and Peter Hammatt	2013	4	0	0	4	0.0	
(England) George Borg	2013–14	34	11	10	13	32.4	
(England) Bradley Quinton	2014–17	114	63	14	37	55.3	
(England) Andy Leese	2017–2023						Isthmian League Cup (Velocity Trophy) 2018–19
Source: Enfield Town

== Other teams ==
=== Reserves ===
The club set up a reserve side in time for the 2006–07 season and joined the Eastern Division of the Capital League. The club's U21 team play in the Isthmian League's U21 North Division.

=== Women's team ===
The club also have a women's team, who play in the FA Women's National League.

== Honours ==
- Isthmian League
  - League Cup winners 2018–19
- Essex Senior League
  - Champions 2002–03, 2004–05
  - League Cup winners 2001–02, 2003–04
- Cherry Red Books Trophy
  - Winners 2001–02
- Middlesex Charity Cup
  - Winners 2001–02, 2007–08
- Supporters Direct Cup
  - Winners 2006–07 (joint), 2011–12, 2012–13
- George Ruffell Memorial Shield
  - Winners 2009–10

== Records ==
- Best FA Cup performance: Fourth qualifying round, 2015–16, 2025–26
- Best FA Trophy performance: Third round, 2021–22, 2024–25
- Best FA Vase performance: Third round, 2003–04, 2004–05
- Record attendance: 2,499 vs St Albans City, National League South, 18 April 2025
- Biggest victory: 7–0 vs Ilford, 29 April 2003
- Most appearances: Rudi Hall
- Most goals: Liam Hope, 108 (2009–2015)

== See also ==
- Enfield Town F.C. players
- List of fan-owned sports teams
