= Hal Robson-Kanu =

Wales international footballer (born 1989)

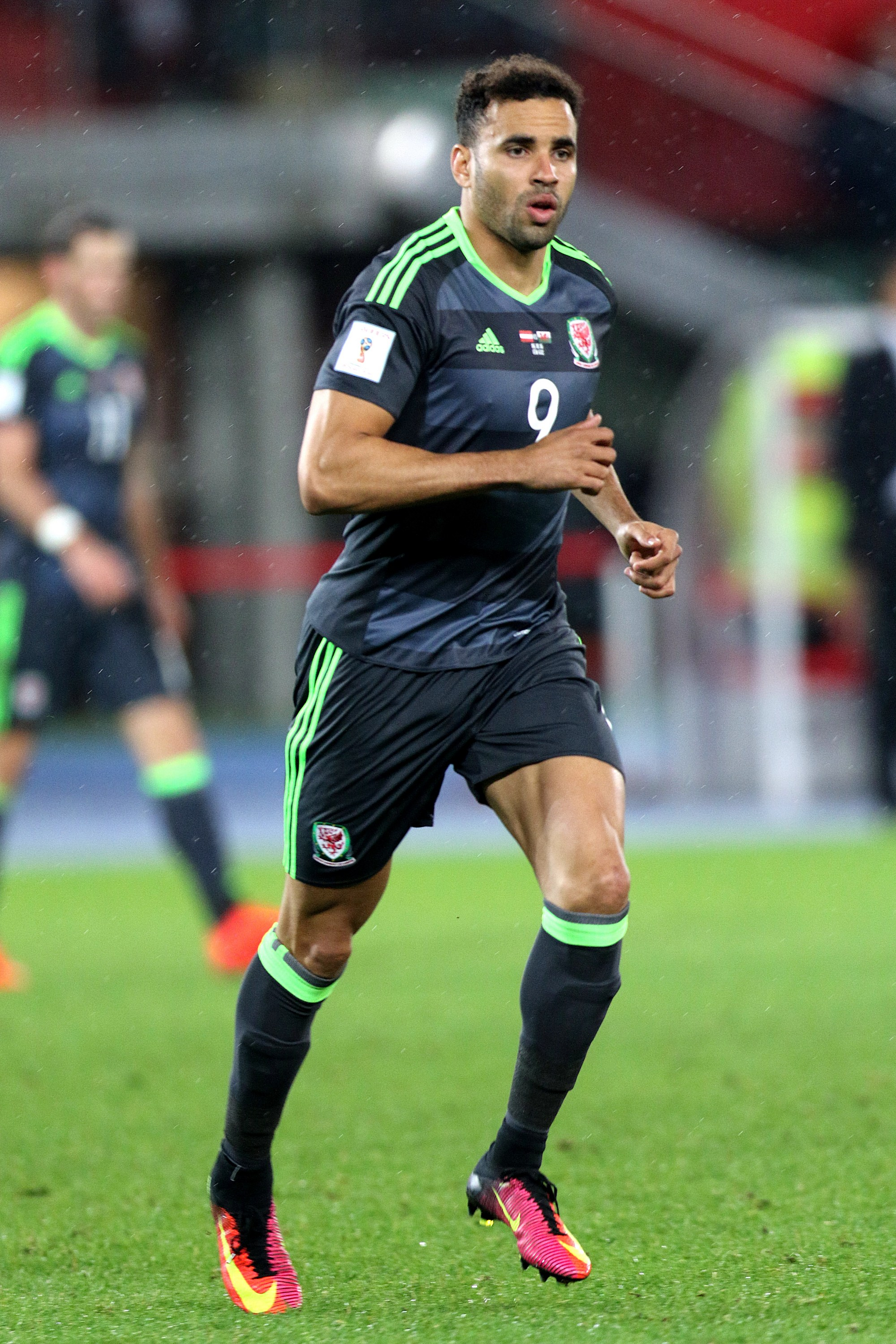
- Robson-Kanu playing for Wales in 2016

Personal information
- Full name: Thomas Henry Alex Robson-Kanu
- Date of birth: 21 May 1989 (age 37)
- Place of birth: Acton, London, England
- Height: 1.83 m (6 ft 0 in)
- Positions: Winger; forward

Youth career
- 1999–2004: Arsenal
- 2004–2007: Reading

Senior career*
Years	Team	Apps	(Gls)
2007–2016	Reading	198	(24)
2008	→ Southend United (loan)	22	(5)
2009	→ Swindon Town (loan)	20	(4)
2016–2021	West Bromwich Albion	143	(21)
Total		383	(54)

International career
2007–2008	England U19	2	(0)
2009	England U20	1	(0)
2010	Wales U21	4	(2)
2010–2021	Wales	46	(5)
Medal record
Men's football
Representing Wales
UEFA European Championship
Bronze medal – third place	2016 France
- * Club domestic league appearances and goals

Thomas Henry Alex "Hal" Robson-Kanu (born 21 May 1989) is a former professional footballer who played as a forward. Born in England, he played for the Wales national team. Although he initially played primarily on the wing, he was used as a forward during Wales' run to the semi-finals of UEFA Euro 2016.

Robson-Kanu started his career as a schoolboy at Arsenal but was released at 15 and joined Reading. After graduating from the academy in 2007 he spent time on loan at Southend United and Swindon Town before returning to Reading and making his first team debut in 2009. Limited to mainly substitute appearances during his first season, he became an important member of the squad appearing regularly during the 2011–12 Championship winning campaign. He made his Premier League debut in 2012 and went on to score 30 goals in 228 games for the club before his release in 2016. He then signed for West Bromwich Albion. After five years, Robson-Kanu was released by the club in May 2021.

At international level Robson-Kanu initially represented the country of his birth, England, at under-19 and under-20 level. In 2010, he switched allegiance to Wales, the country of his grandmother, playing for the under-21 side before his debut for the senior team against Croatia on 23 May that year. Robson-Kanu was selected to represent Wales at UEFA Euro 2016, where they made the semi-finals, with Robson-Kanu notably scoring against Belgium in the quarter-finals.

== Club career ==
=== Reading ===
==== Early career ====
Born in Acton, London, Robson-Kanu began his career at Arsenal as a schoolboy aged 10. He went on to play at Acton Ealing Whistlers for a number of seasons. He was released by the club at 15 and joined Reading after speaking to then Academy manager Brendan Rodgers. After graduating from the Academy he signed his first professional contract in July 2007, penning a two-year deal with the club. The 2007 Peace Cup in South Korea saw Robson-Kanu involved with the Reading senior team for the first time with appearances against River Plate and Shimizu S-Pulse. Steve Coppell's policy of resting first-team players for cup matches saw Robson-Kanu selected on the bench for the first time on 5 January 2008 for the FA Cup third round tie against Tottenham Hotspur, though he remained an unused substitute.

Not in contention for a regular place in the Reading first team, Robson-Kanu's first experience of senior football came on 30 January 2008 when he joined Southend United on loan until the end of the season. He made his debut three days later as a second-half substitute in a 2–2 draw away at Leyton Orient and scored his first career goal against Nottingham Forest. He struck twice more in the next two games against Huddersfield Town and Swansea City and returned to Reading with three goals in eight appearances. Robson-Kanu was again involved in the first team during the 2008–09 pre-season, scoring a goal in a 9–0 win over Didcot Town in July. He re-joined Southend on a month's loan on 21 August 2008 and after one goal in six appearances extended his spell for a second month. He returned to Reading on 15 November after his three-month spell came to an end having made 15 appearances, scoring twice, during his second spell at the club.

After returning to Reading he was among the substitutes for the FA Cup third round tie against Cardiff City on 3 January 2009. He would again have to wait to make his debut though, remaining on the bench as Cardiff won the match. On 26 January 2009 he joined Swindon Town on a one-month loan which, after six games, was extended for a further month. Midway through his spell at Swindon, having impressed on loan at the club as well with Southend previously, he signed a new contract with Reading until 2011. He cemented a regular place in the Swindon team and started in all 20 of his appearances for the club before returning to Reading after three months. At the conclusion of his spell Swindon boss Danny Wilson hailed Robson-Kanu and fellow loanee Gordon Greer for their "fantastic impression" which helped the club pull away from relegation.

==== First-team breakthrough ====
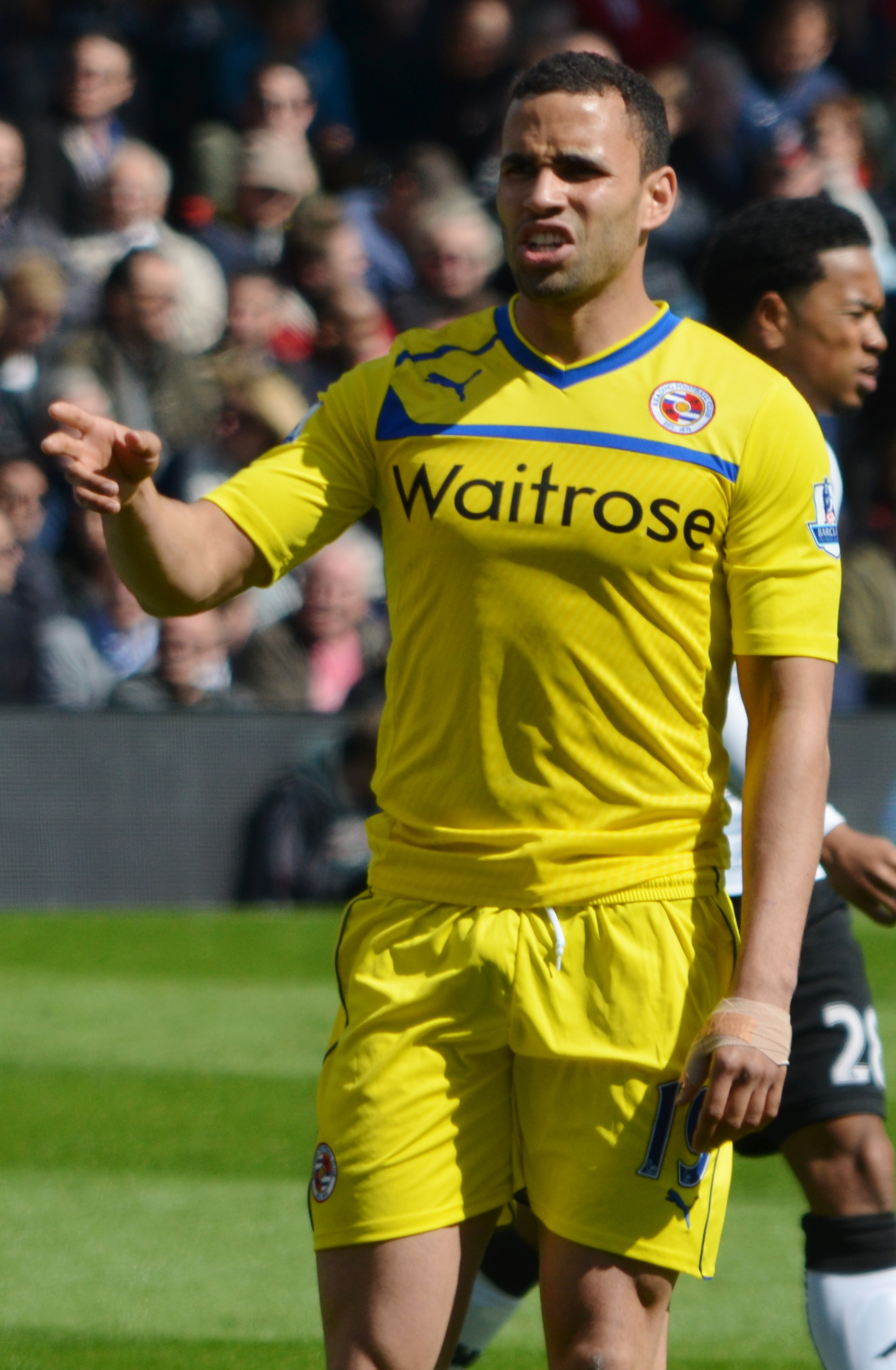
Robson-Kanu playing for Reading in 2013

The 2009–10 season saw Robson-Kanu's former Academy boss Brendan Rodgers take over as Reading manager. He scored five goals during pre-season, including a hat-trick against Jonsereds IF in just 28 minutes during the first game of the tour of Sweden. Robson-Kanu finally made his competitive debut for Reading starting on the right wing in a 0–0 draw with Nottingham Forest on the opening day of the season. He was used mainly as a substitute during his first season, starting just four times in 18 appearances.

The following season saw Robson-Kanu establish himself in the first team setup. He scored his first Reading goal in the League Cup against Northampton Town on 24 August 2010, and followed it with his first league goal in a 3–0 win against Barnsley a month later, having earlier set-up Jimmy Kébé for the second. He continued to feature regularly and finished the season in good goalscoring form, netting four times from March onwards including the winner in a 2–1 wins over Preston North End and Derby County as Reading finished in the play-off positions. He came on as a late substitute in the 4–2 play-off final defeat to Swansea but had no time to influence the game and finished the season with six goals in 34 appearances. His contract expired at the end of the season and despite interest from other Championship clubs including Millwall and Portsmouth, he signed a new three-year contract with Reading in July keeping him with the club until 2014.

After the sale of Shane Long in August 2011, Robson-Kanu was played as a forward by Brian McDermott during some of the pre-season, a position he was familiar with from his Academy years. He struck twice playing up front in the warm-up fixtures and began the season in good goalscoring form with two in the first four games against Leicester City and Barnsley. With injuries to both Kebe and Jobi McAnuff during various points of the season, he soon reverted to a role on the wings though his season followed a familiar pattern to previous years as he was in and out the side, playing a supporting role to the two senior wingers. His longest run of starts came in October when he was named on the teamsheet for six consecutive games. He scored twice more during the campaign, including a spectacular volley against Millwall and finished the season having made 37 appearances, the most in his career to date.

In Kébé, McAnuff and new signing Garath McCleary, Robson-Kanu faced stiff competition for places on the wing for Reading's return to the Premier League. With Kébé injured, he was named on the teamsheet on the opening day of the season as Reading came from behind to draw against Stoke City. Limited to a substitutes role over the next three months, he still managed to score twice, in a defeat to Tottenham Hotspur and a 3–3 draw with Fulham. His only two starts came in the League cup, including the 7–5 defeat to Arsenal in October. He had to wait until 17 November for his next league start in Reading's 2–1 win over Everton, their first league victory of the season, and was a regular over the next month, scoring his third goal of the season in the defeat to Manchester United. Despite his goals, Robson-Kanu again had to settle for a place on the bench with two FA Cup matches his only starts for the club between December and March. He scored a late consolation goal coming on as a substitute against Everton on 2 March and returned to the lineup for the following game against Aston Villa.

The game against Villa proved to be Brian McDermott's last in charge and Robson-Kanu, having played only a bit-part role under the former manager, began to feature more prominently with the appointment of Nigel Adkins. He missed just two games under Adkins through a freak knee injury, and with a regular berth on the wing finished the season strongly, scoring against Arsenal, and twice in Reading's 4–2 win over Fulham. Having enjoyed his most prolific season yet, scoring seven times, Robson-Kanu was nominated for Reading Player of the Season. In a fans vote he finished in third place behind Adam Le Fondre and Alex McCarthy, despite all three players starting 13 or fewer league games all season. He signed a new contract in July 2013, keeping him with Reading until June 2016. Reading announced on 9 May 2016, that Robson-Kanu would leave Reading when his contract expired at the end of June 2016.

=== West Bromwich Albion ===
On 31 August 2016 after reportedly turning down "significant offers" from Asia, Robson-Kanu signed a two-year contract, with the option of a third year, with Premier League side West Bromwich Albion. He made his first start of the season on 31 December 2016 in a 2–1 win over Southampton, finishing the game with a goal and an assist.

In July 2017, Robson-Kanu signed a new three-year contract with West Brom. In "The Baggies" second game of the 2017–18 Premier League season against Burnley, Robson-Kanu became only the fourth player in Premier League history to get substituted on, score then get sent off.

After West Brom's relegation from the Premier League in 2018, Robson-Kanu scored twice and assisted once as his team beat Coventry City 5–2 to win the inaugural Regis Shield. He then scored his first league goal of the 2018–19 Championship season in a 4–3 win away at Norwich City. He headed home his fourth league goal of the season away at Aston Villa in a 2–0 away win as West Brom closed in for a promotion place. He missed the playoff campaign after receiving a red card against Derby County on the final day of the season.

On 19 October 2019, the day after signing a contract extension to keep him at the club until 2021, Robson-Kanu came off the bench to score a late winner in a 1–0 away win against Middlesbrough. He scored six goals in nine games between October and December, and ended the season as the team's joint top scorer alongside Charlie Austin with ten, as Slaven Bilić's team won promotion as runners-up.

On 17 May 2021, Robson-Kanu scored his first Premier League goal of the 2020–21 season in a 1–2 home defeat against Liverpool.

On 27 May 2021 it was announced that Robson-Kanu would leave West Bromwich Albion after five years following the conclusion of his contract, having appeared for the club 154 times scoring 24 goals. A year after being released and having failed to find a new club, Robson-Kanu revealed that he left Albion because he felt the club was lacking the direction needed to push for promotion. "I didn't agree with the direction the club was going in," he told the Express & Star 's Baggies Broadcast podcast. "If I was staying there had to be a long-term vision, a project. I didn't want to be in a place where we were languishing in mid-table in the Championship."

== International career ==
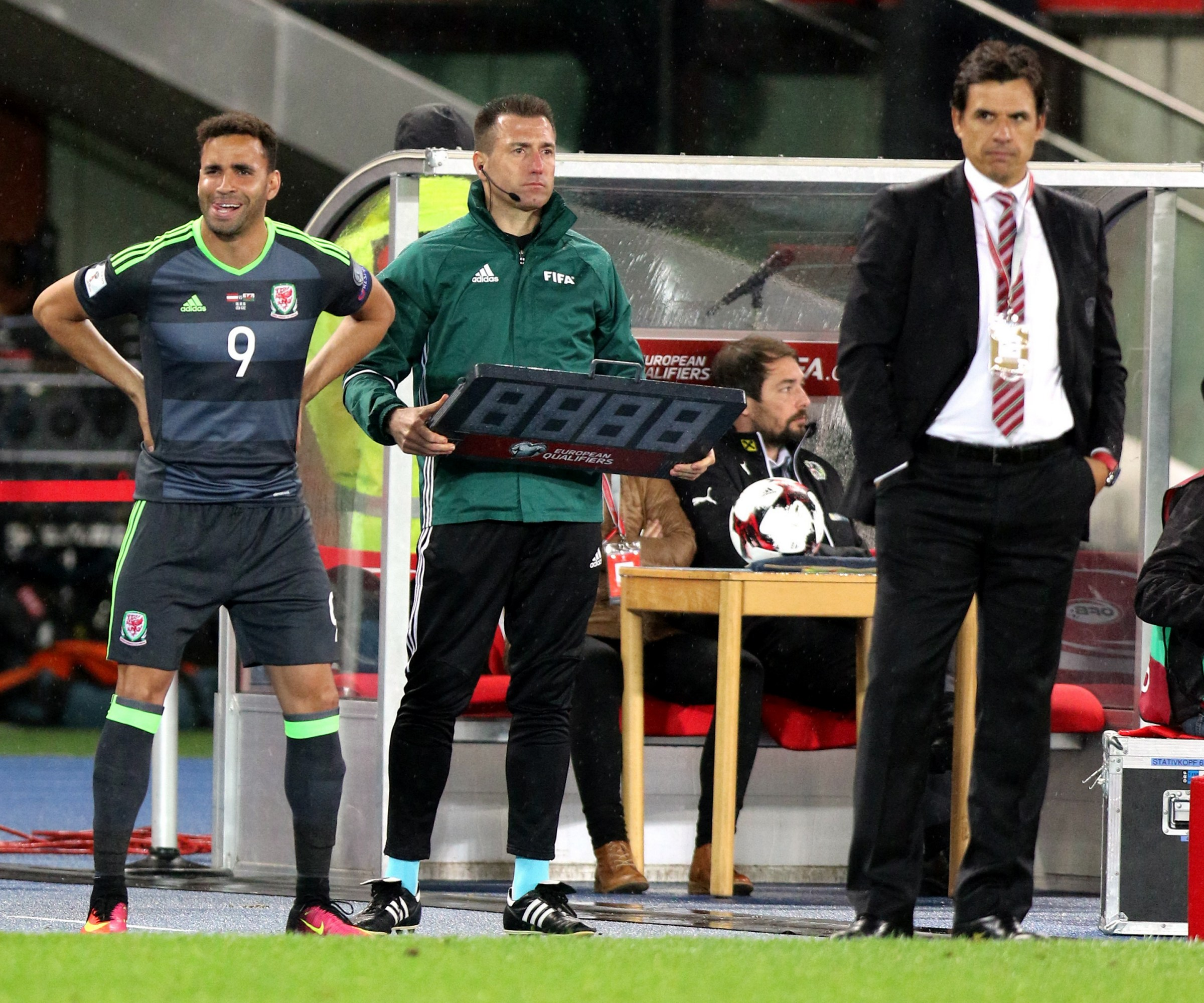
Robson-Kanu preparing to come on for Wales against Austria in October 2016

Robson-Kanu was born in England to a Nigerian father, and an English mother of Welsh descent. Robson-Kanu initially represented England at international level, making his debut for the under-19 side against Germany in November 2007. He made a second appearance against Croatia the following year before winning one cap for the England under-20s against Montenegro in 2009.

In 2010, he switched to Wales, for which he qualifies through his Caerphilly-born grandmother. The switch came about when Welsh coach Brian Flynn came to the Reading training ground to see Simon Church, and Glen Little jested that Robson-Kanu would be eligible for Wales through going on holiday there. Robson-Kanu told Flynn that the family went to Tenby via picking up his grandmother in Caerphilly, and Flynn asked whether she was born in Wales.

He was first selected in the Wales under-21s squad for the friendly against Austria on 18 May 2010 and made his debut in a 1–0 defeat. Robson-Kanu's first cap for the senior team came just five days later, coming on as a second-half substitute for Robert Earnshaw in a 2–0 loss to Croatia. He continued to play for the under-21s after his senior debut and made a further three appearances, scoring twice, with his last appearance coming in a defeat to Italy which ended Wales hopes of qualifying for the European Under-21 Football Championships. He scored his first senior international goal on 22 March 2013 in a 2–1 World Cup qualifying win over Scotland at Hampden Park.

Robson-Kanu gained notoriety when during a friendly game against the Netherlands, his shorts tore and he had to change shorts in the middle of the game, showing off his briefs.

Robson-Kanu played nine games in Wales' successful qualification campaign for UEFA Euro 2016, scoring on 13 October 2014 in their 2–1 home win over Cyprus. After being selected for the final tournament in France, on 11 June he came on as a 71st-minute substitute in place of Jonny Williams during their opener against Slovakia and scored the winner in a 2–1 victory in Bordeaux. He also started as striker in Wales' historic 3–1 quarter-final win on 1 July against Belgium in Lille and, after outwitting three defenders with a Cruyff turn, scored the team's second goal. It was nominated in the FIFA Puskás Award for best goal of the year. Wales were eliminated following a 2–0 defeat to eventual champions Portugal in the semi-final of the tournament on 6 July.

Robson-Kanu then made 9 appearances, scoring once, as Wales failed to qualify for the 2018 FIFA World Cup.

On 29 August 2018, Robson-Kanu announced his retirement from international football. After reversing his decision, he was called up for the matches against Finland and Bulgaria in October 2020.

Robson-Kanu, Tyler Roberts and Rabbi Matondo were all sent home from the Wales squad in March 2021 after breaching COVID-19 protocols. He was not included in Rob Page's squad for UEFA Euro 2020 that May.

== Outside football ==
In August 2018, Robson-Kanu founded The Turmeric Co. brand, selling a range of turmeric-based shots made from natural ingredients. Robson-Kanu has hailed turmeric as his 'secret weapon', claiming that using turmeric as a nutritional supplement saved his footballing career and helped him to recover from a cruciate knee ligament rupture.

== Career statistics ==
=== Club ===
Appearances and goals by club, season and competition
Club	Season	League			FA Cup		League Cup		Other		Total	
Club	Season	Division	Apps	Goals	Apps	Goals	Apps	Goals	Apps	Goals	Apps	Goals
Reading	2007–08	Premier League	0	0	0	0	0	0	—		0	0
Reading	2008–09	Championship	0	0	0	0	0	0	0	0	0	0
Reading	2009–10	Championship	17	0	1	0	0	0	—		18	0
Reading	2010–11	Championship	27	5	4	0	1	1	2 (Note: Appearances in Championship play-offs)	0	34	6
Reading	2011–12	Championship	36	4	1	0	1	0	—		38	4
Reading	2012–13	Premier League	25	7	3	0	2	0	—		30	7
Reading	2013–14	Championship	36	4	0	0	1	0	—		37	4
Reading	2014–15	Championship	29	1	6	3	1	0	—		36	4
Reading	2015–16	Championship	28	3	5	2	2	0	—		35	5
Reading	Total		198	24	20	5	8	1	2	0	228	30
Southend United (loan)	2007–08	League One	8	3	0	0	0	0	0	0	8	3
Southend United (loan)	2008–09	League One	14	2	0	0	0	0	1 (Note: Appearance in Football League Trophy)	0	15	2
Southend United (loan)	Total		22	5	0	0	0	0	1	0	23	5
Swindon Town (loan)	2008–09	League One	20	4	0	0	0	0	0	0	20	4
West Bromwich Albion	2016–17	Premier League	29	3	1	0	0	0	—		30	3
West Bromwich Albion	2017–18	Premier League	21	2	2	0	1	0	—		23	2
West Bromwich Albion	2018–19	Championship	35	4	3	0	2	0	—		40	4
West Bromwich Albion	2019–20	Championship	39	10	0	0	0	0	—		39	10
West Bromwich Albion	2020–21	Premier League	19	2	0	0	2	3	—		21	5
West Bromwich Albion	Total		143	21	6	0	5	3	—		154	24
Career total			383	54	26	5	13	4	3	0	425	63

=== International ===
Appearances and goals by national team and year
National team	Year	Apps	Goals
Wales	2010	2	0
Wales	2011	3	0
Wales	2012	6	0
Wales	2013	8	1
Wales	2014	5	1
Wales	2015	6	0
Wales	2016	9	2
Wales	2017	5	1
Wales	2020	1	0
Wales	2021	1	0
Total		46	5

As of match played 27 March 2021
Scores and results list Wales' goal tally first, score column indicates score after each Robson-Kanu goal.

List of international goals scored by Hal Robson-Kanu
No.	Date	Venue	Cap	Opponent	Score	Result	Competition
1	22 March 2013	Hampden Park, Glasgow, Scotland	13	Scotland	2–1	2–1	2014 FIFA World Cup qualification
2	13 October 2014	Cardiff City Stadium, Cardiff, Wales	23	Cyprus	2–0	2–1	UEFA Euro 2016 qualification
3	11 June 2016	Nouveau Stade de Bordeaux, Bordeaux, France	31	Slovakia	2–1	2–1	UEFA Euro 2016
4	1 July 2016	Stade Pierre-Mauroy, Villeneuve-d'Ascq, France	34	Belgium	2–1	3–1	UEFA Euro 2016
5	5 September 2017	Zimbru Stadium, Chișinău, Moldova	42	Moldova	1–0	2–0	2018 FIFA World Cup qualification

== Honours ==
Reading

- Football League Championship: 2011–12

West Bromwich Albion

- EFL Championship second-place promotion: 2019–20

Individual

- BBC Goal of the Tournament Euro 2016
