= 2011–12 Reading F.C. season =

Reading
2011–12 season
- Chairman: Sir John Madejski
- Manager: Brian McDermott
- Stadium: Madejski Stadium
- Championship: 1st (champions)
- FA Cup: Third round (Vs. Stevenage)
- League Cup: First round (Vs. Charlton Athletic)
- Top goalscorer: League: Adam Le Fondre (12); All: Adam Le Fondre (12)
- Highest home attendance: 24,026 vs. West Ham United; 10 December 2011
- Lowest home attendance: 15,124 vs. Doncaster Rovers; 17 September 2011
- Average home league attendance: 19,219
Home colours	Away colours

The 2011–12 season was Reading Football Club's fourth consecutive season in the Championship since relegation from the Premier League in 2008. It was Brian McDermott's second full season in charge.

Despite a poor start, which saw them 23rd in the table at one point, Reading went on to win 17 of 23 games in the second half of the season, securing the Championship title and ensuring promotion back to the Premier League. McDermott was named the LMA Championship Manager of the Season for the achievement.

== Season review ==
=== Pre-season ===
==== Transfers ====
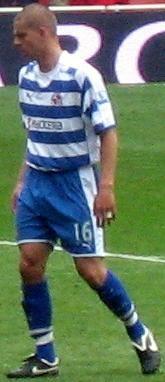
Ívar Ingimarsson left the club in June after almost eight years and 281 appearances. Pictured in 2008.

On 2 June Reading announced that long time defender and club captain Ívar Ingimarsson was being released, along with David Mooney, Abdulai Bell-Baggie, Danny Joyce, James Rowe and Erik Opsahl. It was also revealed that Julian Kelly and Scott Davies were also leaving to join Notts County and Crawley Town respectively. On the same day Reading announced the signings of Australian youth internationals, and brothers, Cameron and Ryan Edwards from Perth Glory and the Australian Institute of Sport respectively, as well as confirming that Mikele Leigertwood would be joining from Queens Park Rangers for a substantial fee upon the opening of the transfer window. On 6 July Reading released pictures of their new kits for the upcoming season. On 7 July Matthew Mills was sold to Leicester City for a substantial fee, rumoured to be £5 million. On 13 July the official squad numbers were released for the season along with Jobi McAnuff being named the new club captain following Matt Mills' departure. On 25 July Reading announced that Bongani Khumalo had joined them on a season-long loan from Tottenham Hotspur, and would take the number 26. On 8 August Shane Long was sold to West Brom for an undisclosed amount, believed to be £4.5 million, rising to £6.5 million in clauses.

==== Friendlies ====
On 2 June Reading announced that they would be partaking in a pre-season trip to Slovenia to play a two games between 11 and 20 July, but the opponents had yet to be confirmed. It was also announced that Reading would have a friendly away against Northampton Town on 27 July. The Reading team split into the first team and the Reading X1. The Reading XI played their first pre-season friendly against Eastleigh F.C. losing 3–2, with goals from Jordan Obita and Gozie Ugwu. Obita's goal then lead him to being called up to the first 11's trip to Slovenia. The Reading XI's second pre-season game was against Swindon Supermarine and they won 3–0 with goals from Brett Williams, Michael Cain and David Murphy. On Reading's second game of their tour of Slovenia they lost 3–1 to Karabükspor. Sinan Kaloğlu scored first for Karabükspor after 2 minutes, before Brynjar Gunnarsson equalised 2 minutes later. Sinan Kaloğlu went on to secure the win for Karabükspor, and secure his hat trick, with goals in the 18th and 40th minutes.

=== August ===
On 1 August, Ben Hamer joined Charlton Athletic for an undisclosed amount. Reading started the season on 6 August with a 2–2 draw against Millwall. Millwall took the lead through ex-Reading striker Darius Henderson on 49 minutes, before John Marquis doubled their lead on 62. Reading then brought on substitute Mathieu Manset who scored a quickfire double in the 86th and 89th minutes to level the game and share the points. On 9 August it was announced that Reading's first round League Cup game against Charlton Athletic at The Valley was postponed after police advice, along with a host of other football fixtures including the International friendly between England and the Netherlands, due to the ongoing 2011 London riots.
Reading's second game of the season was away to Leicester City on 13 August. Reading came away with a victory thanks to second half goals from Noel Hunt and Hal Robson-Kanu. Reading's midweek clash was away to Portsmouth on 16 August, and ex-Reading striker Dave Kitson scored the only goal of the game in the 51st minute to subject Reading to their first defeat of the season. On 20 August Reading hosted Barnsley and suffered their second defeat of the season, losing 2–1. Barnsley took the lead in the 27th minute through Stephen Foster. Reading started off the second half by winning two penalties in the space of three minutes. First of all Jimmy Kebe was fouled by Jay McEveley in the box, but the resulting penalty was saved from Ian Harte. The second penalty saw Hal Robson-Kanu fouled in the area and this time Harte handing the ball to Noel Hunt, whose penalty was again saved. On 68 minutes Barnsley doubled their lead thanks to Matt Done. Reading pulled one goal back after being awarded a third penalty on 74 minutes, this time Hal Robson-Kanu took penalty and converted it past Luke Steele.
Reading signed defender Joseph Mills from Southampton on a free transfer on 20 August and followed it with the signature of Kaspars Gorkšs from Queens Park Rangers for an undisclosed amount on the 24th. On 26 August, Reading signed Adam Le Fondre from league two Rotherham United for an undisclosed fee, believed to be around £400k, and two days later Brett Williams went the opposite way to Rotherham United on loan until the end of January 2012. Then next day Reading played Hull City away and suffered their third defeat in a row courtesy of a Robbie Brady goal, leaving Reading in 20th place at the end of August.

=== September ===
Reading started September by losing their fourth straight game, with defeat at home to Watford on the 10th. The goals in this game came from Mark Yeates on 12 minutes and John Eustace on 51, this defeat saw reading drop to 23rd in the championship. 7 days later Reading hosted Doncaster Rovers at home and managed to holt their losing streak by winning 2–0 thanks to goals from Simon Church and Adam Le Fondre's first for the club. On 24 September, Reading visited Coventry City and drew 1–1, both goals came in the first half. Coventry took the lead through Gary McSheffrey after 2 minutes but Simon Church equalised 8 minutes later.

On 27 September Reading announced that midfielders Jake Taylor and Brian Howard had joined Exeter City and Millwall respectively on loan. Later on in the day Reading faced Bristol City at Ashton Gate, with Bristol City taking a 2–0 lead with goals from Albert Adomah in the 22nd and Brett Pitman in the 58th minute. However, Reading came back to win 2–3 after Jobi McAnuff and Adam Le Fondre both scored within 3 minutes of each other before Mathieu Manset found the winner in the fourth minute of stoppage time.

=== October ===
Reading started October with a 0–0 home draw against Middlesbrough on 1st and followed it up 10 days later with an away win at Burnley thanks to a Jem Karacan goal in the 9th minute of injury time. Reading's next game on 19 October was a 2–2 draw at home to Derby County, Theo Robinson opened the scoring in the 59th minute, with Adam Le Fondre equalising in the 65th minute. Tomasz Cywka restored Derby's lead in the 75th minute only for Le Fondre to get his second, and square the game two minutes later. On the 22nd Reading hosted Southampton in that weekend's late kickoff, Mikele Leigertwood put Reading in front in the 71st minute. Southampton then had Dean Hammond sent off for two yellow cards in the 70th and 77th minute, but Steve De Ridder managed to equalise in the 80th minute to end the game 1–1. Reading's last game of October saw them go away to Crystal Palace and earn a 0–0 drawn, which meant that they had gone the month without defeat and extended their unbeaten run 8 games.

=== November ===
Reading's first game of November was an away trip to Nottingham Forest which the lost 1–0 after a 75th strike from Marcus Tudgay, this ended an 8-game unbeaten run. On the 6th, Reading hosted Birmingham City, and thanks to a 75th strike from Noel Hunt, won the game 1–0. 19 November saw Reading host Cardiff City at the Madjeski Stadium. Cardiff took the lead through a 2nd-minute goal from Peter Whittingham, while Mark Hudson made it 2–0 in the 70th minute. Reading pulled one goal back in the 77th through Jimmy Kebe but could not find a second, losing the game 1–2. The following weekend Reading travelled to Ipswich Town. Ipswich took the lead in the 56th minute after a Daryl Murphy strike before Kaspars Gorkss briefly leveled things in the 76th before another Ipswich goal in the 79th minute by Josh Carson. Reading managed to still all 3 points with 2 goals in stoppage time thanks to Alex Pearce in the 91st and Noel Hunt 93rd. Reading's last game of November was at home to Peterborough United, which they won 3–2. Peterborough took the lead through Tommy Rowe in the 16th minute before Simon Church equalised in the 27th. After the break Reading took the lead in the 78th minute thanks to Hal Robson-Kanu before extending their lead 2 minutes later through Adam Le Fondre. Emile Sinclair pulled a late goal back for Peterborough in the 90th minute.

=== January ===
On 1 January 2012, Marcus Williams left the club on a free transfer to join Sheffield United. The next day Reading suffered their first defeat in four games away at Cardiff City, losing 3–1. All the goals came in the first half with Cardiff taking a 3–0 lead through Joe Mason, Aron Gunnarsson and Kenny Miller, before Jobi McAnuff scored Reading solitary goal on half time. On 7 January 2012, Reading were knocked out of the F.A. Cup by League One side Stevenage, after losing 1–0 at home to a Darius Charles goal in the 20th minute. On 9 January 2012, it was announced that Alex McCarthy had signed a contract extension until 2015, and also gone out on loan to Ipswich Town for three months. On 12 January 2012 Reading announced the signing of Republic of Ireland U21 international Karl Sheppard from Shamrock Rovers on a free transfer. Reading returned to winning form on 14 January away at Watford. Watford took the lead through a Shaun Cummings own goal after 29 minutes, but Jimmy Kebe fired home the equaliser on 42 to see the sides in level at half time. Reading's winner was thanks to substitute Adam Le Fondre who netted with 5 minutes remaining to give Reading all the points. On 20 January, Reading announced that Russian investment group, Thames Sports Investment, had agreed a deal with Sir John Madejski to buy a significant holding in Reading FC. The deal see Madejski stay on as chairman until 2014, and provide Brian McDermott and Nick Hammond with funds to spend during the January transfer window. 21 January saw Reading lose at home to another promotion contender, Hull City when Robbie Brady scored the only goal of the game after 66 minutes. On 24 January, Jimmy Kebe signed a new contract keeping him at the club until the summer of 2014. On 26 January, Tomasz Cywka joined Reading on a Free transfer from Derby County until the end of the season. On the same day the club also announced the signing of Jason Roberts on an 18-month contract from Blackburn Rovers for an undisclosed fee. Two days later Jason Roberts scored on his debut against Bristol City, converting his saved penalty on 58 minutes after Louis Carey had been shown a straight red card. On Transfer deadline day, 31 January 2012, Reading announced the signing of Matthew Connolly on loan till the end of the season from QPR, while Bongani Khumalo's loan was ended early and he returned to Tottenham Hotspur.

During January, Nigerian defender Chibuzor Okonkwo, was also on trial at the club.

=== February ===
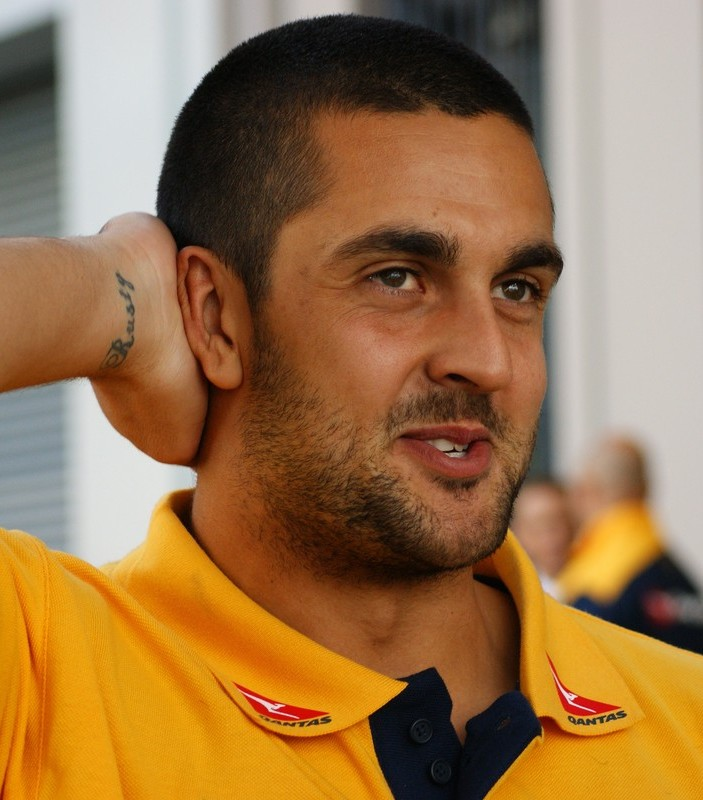
Having conceded no goals during Reading's four victories in February, Adam Federici was named Championship Player of the Month. Pictured in 2008.

February started off for Reading with the Postponement of their Championship game against Doncaster Rovers due to a frozen pitch at the Keepmoat Stadium. This game was later rescheduled for 13 March. On 8 February 2012, young defender Angus MacDonald joined League Two Torquay United on loan until the end of the season, and Brett Williams joined Northampton Town on loan for a month. Also on 8 February, Joseph Mills signed a new two-and-a-half-year contract, keeping him at The Madejski until 2014. On 9 February, another young Reading player – Lawson D'Ath – joined Yeovil Town on loan for a month. After the postponement of the Doncaster game, Reading's first game of February was a 2–0 win at home to Coventry City on 11 February, thanks to goals from Jimmy Kebe and Jason Roberts, his second in two games for Reading. They then travelled away to Derby County for a midweek game on the 14th, which they won 1–0 thanks to a 61st-minute goal from Noel Hunt. Reading where back at home on 17 February for the game against Burnley, which saw Jason Roberts net his third goal in four games to secure a 1–0 win. On 22 February, after rumours linking him with the vacant Wolves job, Brian McDermott signed a new contract with Reading keeping him at the Madejski Stadium until 2015. On 24 February, it was confirmed that Mathieu Manset had joined Chinese Super League side Shanghai Shenhua on loan until 30 June 2012. The next day saw Reading in action against fellow promotion chasers Middlesbrough at the Riverside Stadium. Noel Hunt's first half goal and Ian Harte's superb free kick saw Reading come away with another three points, and meant that they had won all four games played in February.

=== March ===
On 2 March, it was announced that Jordan Obita would be joining Gillingham on loan for a month. On 3 March, Reading came from 1–0 down away to Millwall to win 2–1, thanks to goals from Hal Robson-Kanu and substitute Adam Le Fondre, to extended their winning run to 6 games. Reading extended their winning run to 7 on 6 March, with a 1–0 victory over Portsmouth thanks to a first half goal from Noel Hunt. On 8 March, it was announced that Brian McDermott had been nominated for February's Manager of the Month for four wins out of four, while Adam Federici had been nominated for Player of the Month for keeping four clean sheets in the four wins. The next day it was announced that both McDermott and Federici had won the awards. On 10 March, Reading played Leicester City at the Madejski Stadium and came away with their 8th win on the trot, 3–1, thanks to goals from Mikele Leigertwood, Jason Roberts and Simon Church with Neil Danns scoring Leicester City's consolation goal in the 92nd minute. On 13 March Reading played their re-arranged away fixture against Doncaster Rovers, which ended 1–1 ending Reading's winning streak but continuing their unbeaten run, their goal was courtesy of Alex Pearce. On 15 March, Reading announced the signing of Hayden Mullins on loan until the end of the season from Portsmouth. On 17 March, Reading headed to Barnsley, and after a goalless first half, early second half goals from Jobi McAnuff and Jem Karacan gave reading the lead. Reading added another from Karacan midway through the second half and then a fourth thanks to Jason Roberts in the 89th minute. This victory extended their unbeaten run to 10 games and moved them 3 points clear of West Ham United in second place. On 20 March Reading's unbeaten run came to an end away at Peterborough United, losing 3–1. Reading took the lead through Noel Hunt in the 20th minute, before George Boyd equalised 5 minutes later. Peterborough took the lead in the 34th minute thanks to Tyrone Barnett, before Paul Taylor finished the scoring 8 minutes from time. Despite the defeat Reading remained in 2nd place. On 22 March, Reading announced the loan signing of Benik Afobe from Arsenal until the end of the season. On 24 March, Reading got back to winning ways with a 3–1 home victory over Blackpool, with the goals coming from Ian Harte and Alex Pearce in the first half and Mikele Leigertwood in the second. Blackpools goal was scored by Lomana LuaLua. Alex McCarthy was recalled from his loan with Ipswich Town on 28 March due to an injury to Mikkel Andersen. Reading saw out March the way they started by winning their 6th game of the month, away to West Ham United. Reading went 1–0 down inside 10 minutes to Carlton Cole's goal, before two goals at the end of the first half through, Kaspars Gorkšs and Noel Hunt, saw Reading goal in at the break ahead. The second half saw a converted penalty from Ian Harte and a Ricardo Vaz Tê header make it 2–3, before Mikele Leigertwood sealed the win with his 4th goal of the season making it 2–4 victory to Reading.

=== April ===
On 5 April, it was announced that McDermott had been nominated for March's Manager of the Month, while Ian Harte had been nominated for Player of the Month. The next day before Reading's home game against Leeds United it was announced that McDermott had won the manager of the month. Reading's first game in April was on Good Friday against Leeds United, which they won 2–0 thanks to two late Adam Le Fondre goals after Leeds had Zac Thompson sent off in the 12th minute. Reading then travelled to Brighton & Hove Albion on 10 April, and secured a narrow 1–0 victory after a deflected Ian Harte free kick in the 14th minute. Reading then played Southampton at the St Mary's on 13 April. Reading took the lead through Jason Roberts in the 19th minute, before Rickie Lambert levelled it for the Saints in the three minutes into the second half. McDermott then introduced Adam Le Fondre as a 64th minute sub, who scored in the 72nd and 90th minutes to win the game 3–1 for Reading.

On 17 April, Reading beat Nottingham Forest 1–0 at home. With West Ham United's 1–1 draw against Bristol City the same evening, Reading were automatically promoted to the Premier League. Four days later their 2–2 draw with Crystal Palace, coupled with Southampton's 2–1 defeat at Middlesbrough, ensured they would be promoted as division champions.

Reading's last game of the season was away to Birmingham City which they lost 2–0. On 3 May it was announced that Adam Le Fondre had been nominated for the April player of the month after scoring five goals during the month.

=== May ===
Following the close of the season, Brian McDermott was named Championship Manager of the Year at the League Managers Association Awards, as voted by fellow professional managers. Reading would release thirteen players at the end of the season, they included Andy Griffin, who played 42 games for Reading after joining the club in 2010, Brian Howard, who played 67 games for the club in three years and Tomasz Cywka, who joined Reading in the January, but only played four times.

== Squad ==
As of match played 28 April 2012

No.	Name	Nationality	Position	Date of birth (Age (Note: Age as of the end of the season))	Signed from	Signed in	Contract ends	Apps.	Goals
Goalkeepers
1	Adam Federici	(Australia)	GK	31 January 1985 (aged 27)	Torres	2005	2013	166	1
12	Alex McCarthy	(England)	GK	3 December 1989 (aged 22)	Academy	2007	2013	16	0
30	Simon Locke	(England)	GK	15 October 1991 (aged 20)	Academy	2011	2012	0	0
31	Mikkel Andersen	(Denmark)	GK	17 December 1988 (aged 23)	AB Copenhagen	2007		0	0
Defenders
2	Andy Griffin	(England)	DF	7 March 1979 (aged 33)	Stoke City	2010	2012	47	0
3	Matthew Connolly	(England)	DF	24 September 1987 (aged 24)	on loan from Queens Park Rangers	2012	2012	6	0
5	Alex Pearce	(Scotland) (Note: Alex Pearce was born in Wallingford, England, but also qualified to represent Scotland and the Republic of Ireland internationally through his parents and has represented Scotland at youth and U-21 level. He would, however, later be called up and make his full international debut for the Republic of Ireland in September 2012.)	DF	9 November 1988 (aged 23)	Academy	2006	2013	120	9
15	Sean Morrison	(England)	DF	8 January 1991 (aged 21)	Swindon Town	2011		1	1
16	Joseph Mills	(England)	DF	30 October 1989 (aged 22)	Southampton	2011	2014	16	0
17	Kaspars Gorkss	(Latvia)	DF	6 November 1981 (aged 30)	Queens Park Rangers	2011	2014	43	3
23	Ian Harte	(Republic of Ireland)	DF	31 August 1977 (aged 34)	Carlisle United	2010	2012	81	15
24	Shaun Cummings	(England) (Note: Cummings was born in Hammersmith, England, but qualified to represent Jamaica and made his international debut for Jamaica in September 2013.)	DF	25 February 1989 (aged 23)	Chelsea	2009	2013	56	0
34	Ethan Gage	(Canada)	DF	8 May 1991 (aged 20)	Vancouver Whitecaps	2011	2012	0	0
35	Michael Hector	(England) (Note: Hector was born in East Ham, England, but qualified to represent Jamaica and made his international debut for Jamaica in June 2015.)	DF	19 July 1992 (aged 19)	Academy	2010	2012	0	0
36	Jack Mills	(England)	DF	26 March 1992 (aged 20)	Academy	2010	2012	0	0
42	Carl McHugh	(Republic of Ireland)	DF	5 February 1993 (aged 19)	Academy	2011	2012	0	0
43	Nick Arnold	(England)	DF	3 July 1993 (aged 18)	Academy	2011	2012	0	0
46	Angus MacDonald	(England)	DF	15 October 1992 (aged 19)	Academy	2011	2013	0	0
Midfielders
4	Jem Karacan	(Turkey) (Note: Jem Karacan was born in Lewisham, England, but also qualifies to represent Turkey internationally through his father and has represented Turkey at every youth level.)	MF	21 February 1989 (aged 23)	Academy	2007		133	8
6	Brynjar Gunnarsson	(Iceland)	MF	16 October 1975 (aged 36)	Watford	2005	2012	163	10
7	Jay Tabb	(Republic of Ireland) (Note: Jay Tabb was born in Tooting, England, but also qualified to represent the Republic of Ireland internationally, and represented Ireland at U-21 level in 2005.)	MF	21 February 1984 (aged 28)	Coventry City	2009	2013	89	0
8	Mikele Leigertwood	(Antigua and Barbuda) (Note: Leigertwood was born in Enfield, England, but qualified to represent Antigua and Barbuda and made his international debut for Antigua and Barbuda in November 2008.)	MF	12 November 1982 (aged 29)	Queens Park Rangers	2011	2014	71	7
11	Jobi McAnuff	(Jamaica) (Note: McAnuff was born in Enfield, England, but qualified to represent Jamaica and made his international debut for Jamaica in May 2002.)	MF	9 November 1981 (aged 30)	Watford	2009	2014	130	13
14	Jimmy Kébé	(Mali) (Note: Jimmy Kébé was born in Vitry-sur-Seine, France, but qualified to represent Mali internationally and made his international debut for Mali in 2004.)	MF	19 January 1984 (aged 28)	RC Lens	2008	2014	171	26
19	Hal Robson-Kanu	(England) (Note: Hal Robson-Kanu was born in Ealing, England, and represented England at U-19 and U-20 level, but also qualified to represent Wales through his grandmother and made his international debut for the Welsh U-21 side in May 2010 before making his full international debut for Wales five days later.)	MF	21 May 1989 (aged 22)	Academy	2007	2014	89	10
20	Brian Howard	(England)	MF	23 January 1983 (aged 29)	Sheffield United	2009	2012	67	3
25	Jake Taylor	(Wales) (Note: Taylor was born in Ascot, England, and but chose to represent Wales, qualifying through his grandfather who has born in Barry. Taylor has represented Wales at U-17, U-19 and U-21 level.)	MF	1 December 1991 (aged 20)	Academy	2009		2	0
26	Hayden Mullins	(England)	MF	27 March 1979 (aged 33)	Portsmouth	2012	2012	7	0
28	Michail Antonio	(England) (Note: Michail Antonio was born in Wandsworth, England, but also qualified to represent Jamaica internationally, going on to make his debut for Jamaica in 2021.)	MF	28 March 1990 (aged 22)	Tooting & Mitcham United	2008		30	1
37	Jordan Obita	(England) (Note: Obita was born in Oxford, England, but qualified to represent Uganda and made his international debut for Uganda in June 2025.)	MF	8 December 1993 (aged 18)	Academy	2010	2014	1	0
38	Frankie Raymond	(England)	MF	18 November 1992 (aged 19)	Academy	2011	2012	0	0
40	Lawson D'Ath	(England)	MF	24 December 1992 (aged 19)	Academy	2009	2013	1	0
41	Tomasz Cywka	(Poland)	MF	27 June 1988 (aged 23)	Derby County	2012	2012	4	0
44	John Goddard	(England)	MF	2 June 1993 (aged 18)	Academy	2011	2012	0	0
45	Ryan Edwards	(Australia)	MF	17 November 1993 (aged 18)	Australian Institute of Sport	2011	2015	0	0
47	Charlie Losasso	(England)	MF	11 November 1992 (aged 19)	Academy	2011	2012	0	0
50	Cameron Edwards	(Australia)	MF	27 March 1992 (aged 20)	Perth Glory	2011	2012	0	0
Forwards
9	Adam Le Fondre	(England)	FW	2 December 1986 (aged 25)	Rotherham United	2011	2014	33	12
10	Noel Hunt	(Republic of Ireland)	FW	26 December 1982 (aged 29)	Dundee United	2008	2013	132	33
18	Simon Church	(Wales) (Note: Simon Church was born in High Wycombe, England, but also qualifies to represent Wales through his grandparents and made his international debut for the Welsh U-21 side in August 2007 before making his full international debut for Wales in May 2009.)	FW	10 December 1988 (aged 23)	Academy	2007	2013	121	24
21	Karl Sheppard	(Republic of Ireland)	FW	14 February 1991 (aged 21)	Shamrock Rovers	2012	2014	0	0
22	Mathieu Manset	(France)	FW	5 August 1989 (aged 22)	Hereford United	2011	2013	31	5
27	Cédric Baseya	(Democratic Republic of the Congo) (Note: Baseya was born in Brétigny-sur-Orge, France, but qualified to represent Democratic Republic of the Congo and made his international debut for DR Congo U20 in 2007.)	FW	19 December 1987 (aged 24)	AS Cherbourg	2011	2012	0	0
29	Nicholas Bignall	(England)	FW	11 July 1990 (aged 21)	Academy	2008	2013	1	0
32	Jacob Walcott	(England)	FW	29 June 1992 (aged 19)	Academy	2010	2012	0	0
33	Jason Roberts	(Grenada) (Note: Jason Roberts was born in Brent, England, but qualified to represent Grenada internationally through his father and made his international debut in 1999.)	FW	25 January 1978 (aged 34)	Blackburn Rovers	2012	2013	17	6
39	Brett Williams	(England)	FW	1 December 1987 (aged 24)	Eastleigh	2011	2013	0	0
48	David Murphy	(Republic of Ireland)	FW	18 April 1993 (aged 19)	Academy	2011	2012	0	0
49	Gozie Ugwu	(England)	FW	22 April 1993 (aged 19)	Academy	2011	2012	0	0
51	Benik Afobe	(England) (Note: Afobe was born in Leyton, England, but qualified to represent Democratic Republic of the Congo and made his international debut for DR Congo in June 2017.)	FW	12 February 1993 (aged 19)	Arsenal	2012	2012	3	0
	Daniel Carr	(England) (Note: Daniel Carr was born in Lambeth, England, but also qualified to represent Trinidad and Tobago internationally, going on to make his debut for Trinidad and Tobago in 2019.)	FW	29 May 1994 (aged 17)	Academy	2010		0	0
Out on loan
Left during the season
3	Marcus Williams	(England)	DF	8 April 1986 (aged 26)	Scunthorpe United	2010		5	0
9	Shane Long	(Republic of Ireland)	FW	22 January 1987 (aged 25)	Cork City	2005		204	52
26	Bongani Khumalo	(South Africa)	DF	6 January 1987 (aged 25)	on loan from Tottenham Hotspur	2011	2012	5	0

== Transfers ==
=== In ===
Date	Position	Nationality	Name	From	Fee	Ref.
3 May 2011	MF	(Australia)	Cameron Edwards	Perth Glory	Free	
3 May 2011	MF	(Australia)	Ryan Edwards	Australian Institute of Sport	Free	
1 June 2011	MF	(Antigua and Barbuda)	Mikele Leigertwood	Queens Park Rangers	Undisclosed	
22 August 2011	DF	(England)	Joseph Mills	Southampton	Free	
24 August 2011	DF	(Latvia)	Kaspars Gorkšs	Queens Park Rangers	Undisclosed	
27 August 2011	FW	(England)	Adam Le Fondre	Rotherham United	Undisclosed	
21 September 2011	FW	(Democratic Republic of the Congo)	Cédric Baseya	Lille	Free	
12 January 2012	FW	(Republic of Ireland)	Karl Sheppard	Shamrock Rovers	Free	
26 January 2012	MF	(Poland)	Tomasz Cywka	Derby County	Free	
26 January 2012	FW	(Grenada)	Jason Roberts	Blackburn Rovers	Undisclosed	

=== Loans in ===
Start date	Position	Nationality	Name	From	End date	Ref.
25 July 2011	DF	(South Africa)	Bongani Khumalo	Tottenham Hotspur	31 January 2012	
31 January 2012	DF	(England)	Matthew Connolly	Queens Park Rangers	30 June 2012	
15 March 2012	MF	(England)	Hayden Mullins	Portsmouth	30 June 2012	
22 March 2012	FW	(England)	Benik Afobe	Arsenal	30 June 2012	

=== Out ===
Date	Position	Nationality	Name	To	Fee	Ref.
31 May 2011	MF	(Republic of Ireland)	Scott Davies	Crawley Town	Free	
1 June 2011	DF	(England)	Julian Kelly	Notts County	Free	
7 July 2011	DF	(England)	Matt Mills	Leicester City	Undisclosed	
1 August 2011	GK	(England)	Ben Hamer	Charlton Athletic	Undisclosed	
9 August 2011	FW	(Republic of Ireland)	Shane Long	West Bromwich Albion	Undisclosed	
1 January 2012	DF	(England)	Marcus Williams	Sheffield United	Free	

=== Loans out ===
Start date	Position	Nationality	Name	To	End date	Ref.
11 July 2011	DF	(Republic of Ireland)	Carl McHugh	Dundalk	7 November 2011	
28 July 2011	MF	(Wales)	Jake Taylor	Aldershot Town	28 August 2011	
2 August 2011	FW	(England)	Nicholas Bignall	Exeter City	2 September 2011	
3 August 2011	MF	(England)	Frankie Raymond	Eastleigh	11 October 2011	
15 August 2011	MF	(England)	Michail Antonio	Colchester United	5 November 2011	
20 August 2011	FW	(Republic of Ireland)	David Murphy	Cirencester Town	15 September 2011	
28 August 2011	FW	(England)	Brett Williams	Rotherham United	30 January 2012	
27 September 2011	MF	(England)	Brian Howard	Millwall	29 December 2011	
27 September 2011	MF	(Wales)	Jake Taylor	Exeter City	28 February 2012	
29 September 2011	FW	(Republic of Ireland)	David Murphy	Hungerford Town	27 October 2011	
13 October 2011	MF	(England)	Charlie Losasso	Salisbury City	13 November 2011	
25 October 2011	FW	(England)	Nicholas Bignall	Wycombe Wanderers	3 November 2011	
3 November 2011	DF	(England)	Michael Hector	Barnet	30 June 2012	
6 November 2011	GK	(England)	Alex McCarthy	Leeds United	3 January 2012	
24 November 2011	DF	(England)	Angus MacDonald	Basingstoke Town	February 2012	
26 November 2011	FW	(Democratic Republic of the Congo)	Cédric Baseya	Barnet	31 December 2011	
2 December 2011	GK	(England)	Simon Locke	Forest Green Rovers	28 December 2011	
30 December 2011	MF	(England)	Charlie Losasso	Salisbury City	30 June 2012	
9 January 2012	GK	(England)	Alex McCarthy	Ipswich Town	28 March 2012	
24 January 2012	DF	(England)	Sean Morrison	Huddersfield Town	End of season	
27 January 2012	MF	(England)	Jordan Obita	Barnet	29 February 2012	
1 February 2012	FW	(England)	Gozie Ugwu	Ebbsfleet United	4 April 2012	
8 February 2012	DF	(England)	Angus MacDonald	Torquay United	30 June 2012	
8 February 2012	FW	(England)	Brett Williams	Northampton Town	30 June 2012	
9 February 2012	MF	(England)	Lawson D'Ath	Yeovil Town	30 June 2012	
21 February 2012	MF	(England)	Michail Antonio	Sheffield Wednesday	30 June 2012	
24 February 2012	FW	(France)	Mathieu Manset	Shanghai Shenhua	30 June 2012	
2 March 2012	MF	(England)	Jordan Obita	Gillingham	2 April 2012	

=== Released ===
Date	Position	Nationality	Name	Joined	Date	Ref
30 June 2012	GK	(England)	Simon Locke			
30 June 2012	DF	(Canada)	Ethan Gage	Nyköping	1 July 2012	
30 June 2012	DF	(England)	Andy Griffin	Doncaster Rovers	22 October 2012	
30 June 2012	DF	(England)	Jack Mills	Oxford City	17 August 2012	
30 June 2012	DF	(Republic of Ireland)	Carl McHugh	Bradford City	18 August 2012	
30 June 2012	MF	(Australia)	Cameron Edwards	Nike Football Academy	Summer 2012	
30 June 2012	MF	(England)	John Goddard	Hayes & Yeading United	August 2012	
30 June 2012	MF	(England)	Brian Howard	Portsmouth	16 August 2012	
30 June 2012	MF	(England)	Frankie Raymond	Gillingham	5 September 2012	
30 June 2012	MF	(Poland)	Tomasz Cywka	Barnsley	6 August 2012	
30 June 2012	FW	(Democratic Republic of the Congo)	Cédric Baseya	Lokomotiv Sofia	1 November 2013	
30 June 2012	FW	(England)	Jacob Walcott	North Leigh	Summer 2012	
30 June 2012	FW	(Republic of Ireland)	David Murphy			
30 June 2012	FW	(Republic of Ireland)	James Murphy			
30 June 2012	FW	(England)	Daniel Carr	Eastbourne Borough		

== Friendlies ==
9 July 2011	Eastleigh	3–2	Reading XI	Silverlake Stadium
15:00	Forbes 23'; White 27'; Slabber 36'	Report	Obita 20'; Ugwu 51'	Attendance: 526

12 July 2011	Swindon Supermarine	0–3	Reading XI	The Webb's Wood Stadium
		Report	Brett Williams, Michael Cain, David Murphy

15 July 2011	NK Dravograd	0–7	Reading	Ptuj, Slovenia
17:00		Report	Hunt (pen.); Manset; Church; Long	Stadium: Drava Stadium

16 July 2011	Poole Town	2–2	Reading XI	Tatnam
		Report

19 July 2011	Karabükspor	3–1	Reading	Slovenia
17:00	Kaloğlu 2', 18', 40'	Report	Gunnarsson 4'	Stadium: NK Odranci Stadium

19 July 2011	Woking	5–1	Reading XI	Kingfield Stadium
		Report	Triallist

23 July 2011	Northampton Town	0–3	Reading	Sixfields Stadium
15:00		Report	Long 45', 49' (pen.); Robson-Kanu 61'	Attendance: 1,554

26 July 2011	Bristol Rovers	1–2	Reading	Memorial Stadium
19:45	Kuffour 4'	Report	Robson-Kanu 64'; Obita 79'	Attendance: 3,309

30 July 2011	Swindon Town	1–2	Reading	County Ground
15:00	Pearce 18' (o.g.)	Report	Long 53' (pen.); Manset 71'	Attendance: 4,820

== Competitions ==
=== Overall record ===
Competition	First match	Last match	Starting round	Final position	Record							
Competition	First match	Last match	Starting round	Final position	Pld	W	D	L	GF	GA	GD	Win %
Championship	7 August 2011	28 April 2012	Matchday 1	Winners	46	27	8	11	69	41	+28	58.70
FA Cup	7 January 2012	7 January 2012	Third round	Third round	1	0	0	1	1	2	−1	0.00
EFL Cup	23 August 2011	23 August 2011	First round	First round	1	0	0	1	0	1	−1	0.00
Total					48	27	8	13	70	44	+26	56.25

Last updated: 28 April 2012
Source: Soccerway

=== Championship ===
==== Results summary ====
Overall								Home						Away					
Pld	W	D	L	GF	GA	GD	Pts	W	D	L	GF	GA	GD	W	D	L	GF	GA	GD
46	27	8	11	69	41	+28	89	14	5	4	36	18	+18	13	3	7	33	23	+10

Last updated: 28 April 2012.
Source: Reading FC

==== Results by round ====
Round	1	2	3	4	5	6	7	8	9	10	11	12	13	14	15	16	17	18	19	20	21	22	23	24	25	26	27	28	29	30	31	32	33	34	35	36	37	38	39	40	41	42	43	44	45	46
Ground	H	A	A	H	A	H	H	A	A	H	A	H	H	A	A	H	H	A	H	A	H	A	H	H	A	A	H	H	H	A	H	A	A	H	H	A	A	A	H	A	H	A	A	H	H	A
Result	D	W	L	L	L	L	W	D	W	D	W	D	D	D	L	W	L	W	W	L	W	W	W	W	L	W	L	W	W	W	W	W	W	W	W	D	W	L	W	W	W	W	W	W	D	L
Position	12	5	10	13	20	23	14	15	14	15	14	14	15	15	16	14	14	13	9	11	10	7	6	5	5	5	8	4	7	6	3	3	3	3	3	2	2	2	2	2	2	2	1	1	1	1

Source: BBC Sport
A = Away; H = Home; W = Win; D = Draw; L = Loss

==== Fixtures and results ====
6 August 2011 1	Reading	2–2	Millwall	Madejski Stadium
15:00 BST	Manset 86', 89'	BBC; Reading FC	Henderson 49'; Marquis 62'	Attendance: 18,531; Referee: Tony Bates

13 August 2011 2	Leicester City	0–2	Reading	King Power Stadium
15:00 BST		BBC; Reading FC	Hunt 64'; Robson-Kanu 90'	Attendance: 23,399; Referee: Keith Stroud

16 August 2011 3	Portsmouth	1–0	Reading	Fratton Park
19:45 BST	Kitson 51'	BBC; Reading FC		Attendance: 13,438; Referee: Andy D'Urso

20 August 2011 4	Reading	1–2	Barnsley	Madejski Stadium
15:00 BST	Robson-Kanu 74' (pen.)	BBC; Reading FC	Foster 27'; Done 68'	Attendance: 15,878; Referee: Brendan Malone

27 August 2011 5	Hull City	1–0	Reading	KC Stadium
15:00 BST	Brady 73'	BBC; Reading FC		Attendance: 17,295; Referee: Oliver Langford

10 September 2011 6	Reading	0–2	Watford	Madejski Stadium
15:00 BST		BBC; Reading FC	Yeates 12'; Eustace 51'	Attendance: 17,128; Referee: James Linington

17 September 2011 7	Reading	2–0	Doncaster Rovers	Madejski Stadium
15:00 BST	Church 52'; Le Fondre 59'	BBC; Reading FC		Attendance: 15,124; Referee: Graham Salisbury

24 September 2011 8	Coventry City	1–1	Reading	Ricoh Arena
15:00 BST	McSheffrey 2'	BBC; Reading	Church 10'	Attendance: 12,309; Referee: Eddie Ilderton

27 September 2011 9	Bristol City	2–3	Reading	Ashton Gate
20:00 BST	Adomah 22'; Pitman 58'	BBC; Reading FC	McAnuff 71'; Le Fondre 74'; Manset 90+4'	Attendance: 12,018; Referee: Craig Pawson

1 October 2011 10	Reading	0–0	Middlesbrough	Madejski Stadium
15:00 BST		BBC; Reading FC		Attendance: 17,418; Referee: Anthony Taylor

15 October 2011 11	Burnley	0–1	Reading	Turf Moor
15:00 BST		BBC; Reading FC	Karacan 90+9'	Attendance: 13,664; Referee: Paul Gibbs

18 October 2011 12	Reading	2–2	Derby County	Madejski Stadium
20:00 BST	Le Fondre 65', 77'	BBC; Reading FC	Robinson 59'; Cywka 75'	Attendance: 15,704; Referee: Roger East

22 October 2011 13	Reading	1–1	Southampton	Madejski Stadium
17:20 BST	Leigertwood 71'	BBC; Reading FC	Hammond (yellow card) 70' (yellow-red card) 77'; De Ridder 80'	Attendance: 21,889; Referee: Jonathon Moss

29 October 2011 14	Crystal Palace	0–0	Reading	Selhurst Park
15:00 BST		BBC; Reading FC		Attendance: 21,002; Referee: Andy Woolmer

1 November 2011 15	Nottingham Forest	1–0	Reading	City Ground
19:45 GMT	Tudgay 75'	BBC; Reading FC		Attendance: 18,506; Referee: David Webb

6 November 2011 16	Reading	1–0	Birmingham City	Madejski Stadium
15:00 GMT	Hunt 75'	BBC; Reading FC		Attendance: 18,361; Referee: Mark Halsey

19 November 2011 17	Reading	1–2	Cardiff City	Madejski Stadium
15:00 GMT	Kebe 77'	BBC; Reading FC	Whittingham 2'; Hudson 70'	Attendance: 20,361; Referee: Darren Sheldrake

26 November 2011 18	Ipswich Town	2–3	Reading	Portman Road
15:00 GMT	Murphy 56'; Carson 79'	BBC; Reading FC	Gorkss 76'; Pearce 90+1'; Hunt 90+3'	Attendance: 17,154; Referee: Eddie Ilderton

29 November 2011 19	Reading	3–2	Peterborough United	Madejski Stadium
20:00 GMT	Church 27'; Le Fondre 78'; Robson-Kanu 80'	BBC; Reading FC	Rowe 16'; Sinclair 90'	Attendance: 15,907; Referee: Andy Woolmer

3 December 2011 20	Blackpool	1–0	Reading	Bloomfield Road
15:00 GMT	McManaman 55'	BBC; Reading FC		Attendance: 11,656; Referee: Mark Brown

10 December 2011 21	Reading	3–0	West Ham United	Madejski Stadium
15:00 GMT	Pearce 66'; Church 80', 86'	BBC; Reading FC	O'Brien (yellow card) 61' (yellow-red card) 65'; Collison (red card) 84'	Attendance: 24,026; Referee: Neil Swarbrick

17 December 2011 22	Leeds United	0–1	Reading	Elland Road
15:00 GMT		BBC; Reading FC	Church 2'	Attendance: 23,162; Referee: Colin Webster

26 December 2011 23	Reading	3–0	Brighton & Hove Albion	Madejski Stadium
15:00 GMT	McAnuff 17', 45+2'; El-Abd 90+2' (o.g.)	BBC; Reading FC		Attendance: 22,141; Referee: Simon Hooper

31 December 2011 24	Reading	1–0	Ipswich Town	Madejski Stadium
15:00 GMT	Pearce 64'	BBC Reading FC		Attendance: 18,737; Referee: Jock Waugh

2 January 2012 25	Cardiff City	3–1	Reading	Cardiff City Stadium
15:00 GMT	Mason 13'; Gunnarsson 19'; Miller 36'	BBC; Reading FC	McAnuff 45'	Attendance: 23,655; Referee: Chris Foy

14 January 2012 26	Watford	1–2	Reading	Vicarage Road
17:20 GMT	Cummings 29' (o.g.)	BBC; Reading FC	Kébé 42'; Le Fondre 85'	Attendance: 11,291; Referee: Graham Salisbury

21 January 2012 27	Reading	0–1	Hull City	Madejski Stadium
15:00 GMT		BBC; Reading FC	Brady 66'	Attendance: 17,556; Referee: Graham Scott

28 January 2012 28	Reading	1–0	Bristol City	Madejski Stadium
15:00 GMT	Roberts 58'	BBC; Reading FC	Carey (red card) 56'	Attendance: 17,825; Referee: Pat Miller

4 February 2012 29	Doncaster Rovers	Postponed (Note: The Championship game against Doncaster Rovers was postponed due to a frozen pitch at the Keepmoat Stadium. The game was rearranged for 13 March at 19:45.)	Reading	Keepmoat Stadium
15:00 GMT		BBC

11 February 2012 30	Reading	2–0	Coventry City	Madejski Stadium
15:00 GMT	Kebe 25'; Roberts 43'	BBC; Reading FC		Attendance: 18,006; Referee: David Coote

14 February 2012 31	Derby County	0–1	Reading	Pride Park
19:45 GMT		BBC; Reading FC	Hunt 61'	Attendance: 22,567; Referee: Geoff Eltringham

17 February 2012 32	Reading	1–0	Burnley	Madejski Stadium
20:00 GMT	Roberts 11'	BBC; Reading FC		Attendance: 17,185; Referee: Darren Deadman

25 February 2012 33	Middlesbrough	0–2	Reading	Riverside Stadium
15:00 GMT		BBC; Reading FC	Hunt 17'; Harte 80'	Attendance: 17,314; Referee: Stuart Attwell

3 March 2012 34	Millwall	1–2	Reading	The Den
15:00 GMT	Keogh 16'	BBC; Reading FC	Robson-Kanu 45'; Le Fondre 76'	Attendance: 11,271; Referee: Chris Sarginson

6 March 2012 35	Reading	1–0	Portsmouth	Madejski Stadium
20:05 GMT	Hunt 24'	BBC; Reading FC		Attendance: 18,399; Referee: Oliver Langford

10 March 2012 36	Reading	3–1	Leicester City	Madejski Stadium
15:00 GMT	Leigertwood 15'; Roberts 75'; Church 89'	BBC; Reading FC	Danns 90+1'	Attendance: 21,858; Referee: Bobby Madley

13 March 2012 ^{1} 29	Doncaster Rovers	1–1	Reading	Keepmoat Stadium
19:45 GMT	Bennett 27'	BBC; Reading FC	Pearce 51'	Attendance: 8,287; Referee: Tony Bates

17 March 2012 37	Barnsley	0–4	Reading	Oakwell
15:00 GMT		BBC; Reading FC	McAnuff 47'; Karacan 49', 65'; Roberts 89'	Attendance: 9,381; Referee: Darren Sheldrake

20 March 2012 38	Peterborough United	3–1	Reading	London Road
19:45 GMT	Boyd 25'; Barnett 34'; Taylor 82'	BBC; Reading FC	Hunt 20'	Attendance: 6,717; Referee: Simon Hooper

24 March 2012 39	Reading	3–1	Blackpool	Madejski Stadium
15:00 GMT	Harte 30'; Pearce 35'; Leigertwood 60'	BBC; Reading FC	LuaLua 41'	Attendance: 20,906; Referee: Fred Graham

31 March 2012 40	West Ham United	2–4	Reading	Upton Park
15:00 BST	Cole 8'; Vaz Tê 77'	BBC; Reading FC	Gorkšs 44'; Hunt 45+2'; Harte 58' (pen.); Leigertwood 84'	Attendance: 33,350; Referee: Chris Foy

6 April 2012 41	Reading	2–0	Leeds United	Madejski Stadium
14:00 BST	Le Fondre 84', 90'	BBC; Reading FC	Thompson (red card) 12'	Attendance: 22,775; Referee: Darren Drysdale

10 April 2012 42	Brighton & Hove Albion	0–1	Reading	Falmer Stadium
19:45 BST		BBC; Reading FC	Harte 14'	Attendance: 20,610; Referee: Mick Russell

13 April 2012 43	Southampton	1–3	Reading	St Mary's Stadium
19:45 BST	Lambert 48'	BBC; Reading FC	Roberts 19'; Le Fondre 72', 90'	Attendance: 31,892; Referee: Mike Dean

17 April 2012 44	Reading	1–0	Nottingham Forest	Madejski Stadium
20:00 BST	Leigertwood 81'	BBC; Reading FC		Attendance: 22,899; Referee: Gavin Ward

21 April 2012 45	Reading	2–2	Crystal Palace	Madejski Stadium
15:00 BST	Gorkšs 20'; Roberts (red card) 45'; Le Fondre 53'	BBC; Reading FC	Zaha 14'; Murray 76'	Attendance: 23,431; Referee: Andy D'Urso

28 April 2012 46	Birmingham City	2–0	Reading	St Andrew's
12:30 BST	Rooney 24'; Murphy (yellow card) 37'; Elliott 75' (pen.)	BBC; Reading	Connolly (yellow card) 55'	Attendance: 25,516; Referee: Bobby Madley

==== League table ====
Pos	Team	Pld	W	D	L	GF	GA	GD	Pts	Promotion or relegation
1	Reading (C, P)	46	27	8	11	69	41	+28	89	Promotion to the Premier League
2	Southampton (P)	46	26	10	10	85	46	+39	88	Promotion to the Premier League
3	West Ham United (O, P)	46	24	14	8	81	48	+33	86	Qualification for Championship play-offs
4	Birmingham City	46	20	16	10	78	51	+27	76	Qualification for Championship play-offs
5	Blackpool	46	20	15	11	79	59	+20	75	Qualification for Championship play-offs

Updated to match(es) played on 28 April 2012. Source: BBC Sport
Rules for classification: 1) points; 2) goal difference; 3) number of goals scored.
(C) Champions; (O) Play-off winners; (P) Promoted

=== League Cup ===
23 August 2011 First Round	Charlton Athletic	2–1	Reading	The Valley, London
19:45 BST (UTC+1)	Benson 25'; Euell 64'	Report	Morrison 73'	Attendance: 6,668; Referee: Dean Whitestone
Note: Match originally scheduled for 9 August 2011, but postponed on police advice due to the riots happening in London.

=== FA Cup ===
7 January 2012 Third Round	Reading	0–1	Stevenage	Madejski Stadium
15:00		BBC; Reading FC	Charles 20'	Attendance: 11,295; Referee: Nigel Miller

== Squad statistics ==
=== Appearances and goals ===
As of match played 28 April 2012

No.	Pos	Nat	Player	Total		Championship		FA Cup		League Cup	
No.	Pos	Nat	Player	Apps	Goals	Apps	Goals	Apps	Goals	Apps	Goals
1	GK	(Australia) AUS	Adam Federici	47	0	46	0	1	0	0	0
2	DF	(England) ENG	Andy Griffin	9	0	9	0	0	0	0	0
3	DF	(England) ENG	Matthew Connolly	6	0	6	0	0	0	0	0
4	MF	(Turkey) TUR	Jem Karacan	37	3	36+1	3	0	0	0	0
5	DF	(Scotland) SCO	Alex Pearce	47	5	46	5	1	0	0	0
6	MF	(Iceland) ISL	Brynjar Gunnarsson	5	0	1+4	0	0	0	0	0
7	MF	(Republic of Ireland) IRL	Jay Tabb	21	0	10+9	0	1	0	1	0
8	MF	(Antigua and Barbuda) ANT	Mikele Leigertwood	42	5	41	5	1	0	0	0
9	FW	(England) ENG	Adam Le Fondre	33	12	17+15	12	1	0	0	0
10	FW	(Republic of Ireland) IRL	Noel Hunt	41	8	33+8	8	0	0	0	0
11	MF	(Jamaica) JAM	Jobi McAnuff	42	5	40	5	1	0	1	0
12	GK	(England) ENG	Alex McCarthy	1	0	0	0	0	0	1	0
14	MF	(Mali) MLI	Jimmy Kébé	33	3	30+3	3	0	0	0	0
16	DF	(England) ENG	Joseph Mills	16	0	13+2	0	0	0	0+1	0
17	DF	(Latvia) LAT	Kaspars Gorkšs	43	3	42	3	1	0	0	0
18	FW	(Wales) WAL	Simon Church	33	7	19+12	7	1	0	1	0
19	MF	(Wales) WAL	Hal Robson-Kanu	37	4	19+16	4	1	0	0+1	0
20	MF	(England) ENG	Brian Howard	2	0	0+1	0	0	0	1	0
23	DF	(Republic of Ireland) IRL	Ian Harte	34	4	30+2	4	1	0	1	0
24	DF	(England) ENG	Shaun Cummings	36	0	32+2	0	1	0	1	0
26	MF	(England) ENG	Hayden Mullins	7	0	6+1	0	0	0	0	0
33	FW	(Grenada) GRN	Jason Roberts	17	6	17	6	0	0	0	0
37	MF	(England) ENG	Jordan Obita	1	0	0	0	0	0	1	0
41	MF	(Poland) POL	Tomasz Cywka	4	0	1+3	0	0	0	0	0
51	FW	(England) ENG	Benik Afobe	3	0	1+2	0	0	0	0	0
Players out on loan:
15	DF	(England) ENG	Sean Morrison	1	1	0	0	0	0	1	1
22	FW	(France) FRA	Mathieu Manset	17	3	4+11	3	0+1	0	1	0
28	MF	(England) ENG	Michail Antonio	7	0	2+4	0	0+1	0	0	0
40	MF	(England) ENG	Lawson D'Ath	1	0	0	0	0+1	0	0	0
Players who appeared for Reading but left during the season:
9	FW	(Republic of Ireland) IRL	Shane Long	1	0	1	0	0	0	0	0
26	DF	(South Africa) RSA	Bongani Khumalo	5	0	4	0	0	0	1	0

=== Top scorers ===
As of match played 28 April 2012

Place	Position	Nation	Number	Name	Championship	FA Cup	League Cup	Total
1	FW	(England)	9	Adam Le Fondre	12	0	0	12
2	FW	(Republic of Ireland)	10	Noel Hunt	8	0	0	8
3	FW	(Wales)	18	Simon Church	7	0	0	7
4	FW	(Grenada)	33	Jason Roberts	6	0	0	6
5	MF	(Antigua and Barbuda)	8	Mikele Leigertwood	5	0	0	5
5	MF	(Jamaica)	11	Jobi McAnuff	5	0	0	5
5	DF	(Scotland)	5	Alex Pearce	5	0	0	5
8	DF	(Republic of Ireland)	23	Ian Harte	4	0	0	4
8	MF	(Wales)	19	Hal Robson-Kanu	4	0	0	4
10	DF	(Latvia)	17	Kaspars Gorkss	3	0	0	3
10	MF	(Turkey)	4	Jem Karacan	3	0	0	3
10	MF	(Mali)	14	Jimmy Kebe	3	0	0	3
10	FW	(France)	22	Mathieu Manset	3	0	0	3
14	DF	(England)	15	Sean Morrison	0	0	1	1
14				Own goal	1	0	0	1
Total					69	0	1	70

=== Clean sheets ===
As of match played 28 April 2012

Place	Position	Nation	Number	Name	Championship	FA Cup	League Cup	Total
1	GK	(Australia)	1	Adam Federici	19	0	0	19
Total					19	0	0	19

=== Disciplinary record ===
As of match played 28 April 2012

Number	Nation	Position	Name	League One		FA Cup		League Cup		Total	
Number	Nation	Position	Name	Yellow card	Red card	Yellow card	Red card	Yellow card	Red card	Yellow card	Red card
2	(England)	DF	Andy Griffin	3	0	0	0	0	0	3	0
3	(England)	DF	Matthew Connolly	2	0	0	0	0	0	2	0
4	(Turkey)	MF	Jem Karacan	5	0	0	0	0	0	5	0
5	(Scotland)	DF	Alex Pearce	6	0	0	0	0	0	6	0
7	(Republic of Ireland)	MF	Jay Tabb	1	0	0	0	0	0	1	0
8	(Antigua and Barbuda)	MF	Mikele Leigertwood	6	0	0	0	0	0	6	0
9	(England)	FW	Adam Le Fondre	2	0	1	0	0	0	3	0
10	(Republic of Ireland)	FW	Noel Hunt	6	0	0	0	0	0	6	0
11	(Jamaica)	MF	Jobi McAnuff	5	0	0	0	1	0	6	0
14	(Mali)	MF	Jimmy Kébé	2	0	0	0	0	0	2	0
16	(England)	DF	Joseph Mills	3	0	0	0	0	0	3	0
17	(Latvia)	DF	Kaspars Gorkšs	6	0	0	0	0	0	6	0
19	(Wales)	MF	Hal Robson-Kanu	3	0	0	0	1	0	4	0
22	(France)	FW	Mathieu Manset	2	0	0	0	0	0	2	0
23	(Republic of Ireland)	DF	Ian Harte	1	0	0	0	0	0	1	0
24	(England)	DF	Shaun Cummings	2	0	0	0	0	0	2	0
26	(England)	MF	Hayden Mullins	1	0	0	0	0	0	1	0
33	(Grenada)	FW	Jason Roberts	2	1	0	0	0	0	2	1
Players away on loan:
Players who left Reading during the season:
Total				58	1	1	0	2	0	61	1

== Awards ==
=== Player of the season ===
Rank	Name
1	Alex Pearce
2	Jem Karacan
3	Adam Federici

=== LMA Manager of the Year: Championship ===
Name	Rank
Brian McDermott	Won

=== PFA Team of the Year: Championship ===
Position	Name
LB	Ian Harte

=== Player of the Month ===
Month	Name	Award
December	Alex Pearce	Won
February	Adam Federici	Won
March	Ian Harte	Nominated
April	Adam Le Fondre	Nominated

=== Manager of the Month ===
Month	Name	Award
December	Brian McDermott	Nominated
February	Brian McDermott	Won
March	Brian McDermott	Won

=== Team of the Week ===
Week	Position	Player
Week 1	FW	Mathieu Manset
Week 2	DF	Ian Harte
Week 7	DF	Alex Pearce
Week 9	DF	Alex Pearce
Week 12	MF	Mikele Leigertwood
Week 13	DF	Kaspars Gorkšs
Week 17	MF	Jobi McAnuff
Week 19	DF	Alex Pearce
Week 20	DF	Kaspars Gorkšs
Week 27	GK	Adam Federici
Week 27	FW	Jason Roberts
Week 28	DF	Alex Pearce
Week 28	MF	Jimmy Kebe
Week 29	DF	Ian Harte
Week 30	MF	Hal Robson-Kanu
Week 31	DF	Shaun Cummings
Week 31	MF	Mikele Leigertwood
Week 32	MF	Jem Karacan
Week 33	DF	Alex Pearce
Week 34	MF	Mikele Leigertwood
Week 35	MF	Jobi McAnuff
Week 36	DF	Kaspars Gorkšs
Week 36	MF	Jobi McAnuff
Week 36	FW	Adam Le Fondre

=== PFA Player in the Community ===
Name	Award
Noel Hunt	Nominated

=== Championship Apprentice of the Year ===
Name	Award
Jordan Obita	Nominated

== Team kit ==
The 2011–12 Reading F.C. kits.

Supplier: Puma
Sponsor(s): Waitrose

Home colours	Away colours	Goalkeeping colours
