= 2010–11 Reading F.C. season =

Reading
2010–11 season
- Chairman: Sir John Madejski
- Manager: Brian McDermott
- Championship: 5th
- Play-offs: Runners-up vs Swansea City
- FA Cup: Quarter final vs Manchester City
- League Cup: 2nd round vs Northampton Town
- Top goalscorer: League: Shane Long (23); All: Shane Long (25)
- Highest home attendance: 23,677 v Leeds United; Championship 27 November 2010
- Lowest home attendance: 14,029 v Coventry City; Championship 11 December 2010
- Average home league attendance: 17,681
Home colours	Away colours

The 2010–11 season was Reading's third season back in the Championship, since relegation from the Premier League in 2008. Having become Reading manager in January 2010, this was Brian McDermott's first full season in charge at the club.

== Season review ==
See also 2010–11 Football League Championship

=== Pre-season ===
Summer transfers Left-back Marcus Williams joined Reading on a free transfer on 11 May 2010, having played seven seasons for Scunthorpe United. Right-back Andy Griffin signed for the club for a nominal fee on 1 July, having made 25 league appearances for Reading, on loan from Stoke City in the 2009–10 season. The transfer deadline day saw the arrival of Zurab Khizanishvili on loan from Blackburn Rovers and Ian Harte from Carlisle United.

Marek Matějovský joined Sparta Prague for a fee of £650,000 on 11 June 2010, having made 56 appearances for the Royals in two-and-a-half years at the club. Kalifa Cissé left the club after three years, signed by former Reading manager Steve Coppell for Bristol City on 9 July 2010. Cissé made 83 appearances for Reading, scoring seven goals. The transfer window also saw the departure of Gylfi Sigurðsson to German Bundesliga club 1899 Hoffenheim for £7 million.

Friendlies

Reading opened their pre-season campaign with a 1–0 victory over Farnborough, Noel Hunt scoring the winning goal.

The Royals then departed on tour to Slovenia, where they enjoyed a 3–1 victory over a Red Star Belgrade B-side, a game in which Marcus Williams made his first appearance for the club. Alex Pearce headed a first-half response for Reading, after Belgrade had taken the lead, and Simon Church sealed the victory with two second-half goals. A third consecutive win followed, as Reading defeated top-flight Croatian side Inter Zaprešić 2–0, with goals from Matt Mills and James Henry. Reading then suffered their first loss of the pre-season campaign, in the final game of the tour, with a 1–0 defeat against NK Celje, striker Gorazd Zajc scored the only goal in the game.

Returning to England, Reading got back to winning ways, coming from behind to beat Wycombe Wanderers 2–1, thanks to goals from Gylfi Sigurðsson, from the penalty spot, and Hal Robson-Kanu. Another 2–1 victory followed in the Royals penultimate pre-season friendly, as another Sigurðsson penalty, and a second half goal from Michail Antonio saw Reading past Wolverhampton Wanderers. Reading's final game of pre-season was a 4–2 victory at Southampton, courtesy of goals from Sigurðsson, Church (2) and Antonio.

=== August ===
Reading's league season began in disappointing style with a 2–1 home defeat to Scunthorpe United. After the visitors had taken an early lead through a disputed Garry Thompson goal – the linesman flagging for offside and subsequently overruled by the referee – Gylfi Sigurðsson put Reading on level terms from 25 yards. Despite enjoying spells of pressure, the Royals were unable to find another goal, and Rob Jones headed home a corner to give Scunthorpe the victory.

Reading progressed to the second round of the League Cup with a narrow victory over Torquay United, Grzegorz Rasiak bundling home the winner in the final minute of extra-time. A league draw at Portsmouth followed, the Royals coming from behind to take a point as Jimmy Kébé poked the ball home in the 87th minute following a goal-mouth scramble. The next game Reading went 1–0 up against promotion favourites Nottingham Forest from an Alex Pearce volley, but goalkeeper Adam Federici made a horrible mistake in giving Forest the equaliser by kicking the ball into Jem Karacan which resulted in Robert Earnshaw turning in from close range.

Reading then played League Two opponents Northampton Town in the League Cup in which Reading went 1–0 up courtesy of a Matt Mills backheeler from a Brian Howard corner. Northampton equalised with a horrible mistake from goalkeeper Ben Hamer where he dropped the ball twice in a row to allow Andy Holt a tap-in. Reading went back into the lead with a goal from Hal Robson-Kanu after some saves from the Northampton goalkeeper Oscar Jansson, but again Hamer erred, granting Kevin Thornton the equaliser. In extra time, however, Matt Mills put Reading ahead again only to then score an own goal at the end. Reading subsequently lost 4–2 on penalties, with Simon Church and Jake Taylor having their shots saved. In their next game, Reading won 2–1 over Leicester City with a lob from Gylfi Sigurðsson and a bullet header from Mills. Leicester had equalised with a long range shot from Lloyd Dyer but Reading scored in the 86th minute to hold Leicester at bay for their first win of the season.

=== September ===
On 11 September, after the international break and the sale of Sigurðsson, Reading beat Crystal Palace 3–0. The first goal was a penalty won and scored by Shane Long after he cut in from the left and was taken out by Paddy McCarthy. The second was also a penalty after Jem Karacan ran the whole pitch with the ball, to pass to Long who cut in again and was taken out by Julian Bennett. New signing Ian Harte took responsibility and scored. The third was in extra time when Brian Howard lofted a pass to Jimmy Kébé, who then cut in and fired past Julián Speroni. Next, Reading had an away game against in-form Millwall where it ended 0–0 after some brilliant saves by Adam Federici and Millwall goalkeeper David Forde. Reading then lost 3–1 to Middlesbrough after they went 1–0 down in 24 seconds thanks to Scottish midfielder Barry Robson. Next, an ex-Reading player came back to haunt them; Leroy Lita scored to make it 2–0, but a few minutes later, Kébé got one back after he dribbled round two players then passed back to Brian Howard, who laid him off. David Wheater, however, capped it off for Middlesbrough with a header past Adam Federici. Just before the full-time whistle Brian Howard was shown a straight red after a tackle on Andy Halliday.

Next, Reading beat Barnsley 3–0 with three goals in the last 12 minutes. Chris Armstrong made a comeback after 1 1/2 seasons out of action with a knee injury. Kébé again put Reading in the lead with a bullet header from substitute Hal Robson-Kanu's cross. Ian Harte then curled a perfect free-kick past Luke Steele to make it 2–0. Robson-Kanu then capped it off with a 50-yard run and then a cool finish under goalkeeper Luke Steele. On the 61st minute, however, Zurab Khizanishvili was sent off after a tackle that never was on Chris Wood. On 28 September, a Tuesday, Reading beat Ipswich Town 1–0 after substitute Simon Church came on and after 30 seconds on, he had the ball in the net. Jem Karacan's shot was steered in well by Church and Matt Mills was sent off for two bookable offences; this marked three Reading red cards in three games.

=== October ===
Reading opened October with a trip to Preston North End, earning a 1–1 draw. The Royals went behind in the first-half with a goal from Preston's Keith Treacy, but in the 55th minute, Reading drew level through a sensational 25-yard volley from Jem Karacan. Reading then lost at home to Swansea City by a slim margin, Scott Sinclair giving ex-Reading manager Brendan Rodgers a happy return with his new Swans side. The Tuesday after, Reading again lost, this time to Bristol City with a goal from striker Danny Haynes on 28 minutes. In the next game, Reading beat an "unbeaten-at-home" Burnley 4–0. The first goal came from a Shane Long penalty which he won after being slipped through by Jay Tabb and was fouled by Leon Cort. The next came from Jobi McAnuff after Ian Harte fired in a free-kick and Matt Mills' shot fell to McAnuff to volley in. Soon after, substitute Michail Antonio tapped in Shane Long's cross, while other substitute Simon Church belted in a shot at a tight angle from a Brian Howard pass.

Reading's next match was a 4–3 victory over Doncaster Rovers, coming back from 3–1 down. Matt Mills opened up the scoring early only to have James Hayter equalise. Shelton Martis then put Doncaster in the lead, while two minutes into the second-half, Dean Shiels made it 3–1. Reading brought on Noel Hunt and Simon Church, and Hunt made an immediate impact by crossing in for Jem Karacan to head past Neil Sullivan. Then Harte whipped a superb free-kick into the top corner and to finish off, Church belted in substitute Antonio's squareball.

=== March ===
On 8 March 2011, Chris Armstrong announced his retirement from football following being diagnosed with multiple sclerosis. Later on in the day, Reading travelled to Ipswich and won 3–1 thanks to goals from Shane Long, Ian Harte and Noel Hunt, while Connor Wickham scored a consolation goal in injury time at the end of the second half for Ipswich. Reading's next game was a FA Cup quarter-final match against Manchester City at the City of Manchester Stadium. Reading played well before eventually conceding a 74th-minute goal to Micah Richards that turned out to be the only goal of the game, thus eliminating Reading from the FA Cup. Reading where back playing in the Championship on 19 March away at Barnsley; it was a close game, with the winner for the Royals coming in the 71st minute thanks to second-half substitute Mathieu Manset.

=== April ===
Reading's Good Friday game against fellow promotion chasers Leeds United ended 0–0 to end a run of eight wins on the trot. On 25 April, a Monday, Reading lost their recent unbeaten record of 13 games in a 3–2 defeat at home to relegation threatened Sheffield United. Reading went 2–0 up inside 20 minutes through Noel Hunt and Hal Robson-Kanu before ex-Royal Darius Henderson pulled one back on 30 minutes and Lee Williamson converted on the stroke of half-time. In the second-half, Henderson scored again to seal the win for the Blades. At Reading's final away game of the season, at Coventry City on Saturday, 30 April, they secured the point they need to secure their place in this season's Championship play-offs with a 0–0 draw.

== Squad ==
As of match played 30 May 2011

No.	Name	Nationality	Position	Date of birth (age)	Signed from	Signed in	Contract ends	Apps.	Goals
Goalkeepers
1	Adam Federici	(Australia)	GK	31 January 1985 (aged 26)	Torres	2005		109	1
21	Ben Hamer	(England)	GK	20 November 1987 (aged 23)	Academy	2006		5	0
31	Mikkel Andersen	(Denmark)	GK	17 December 1988 (aged 22)	AB	2007		0	0
41	Alex McCarthy	(England)	GK	3 December 1989 (aged 21)	Academy	2007		15	0
42	Simon Locke	(England)	GK	15 October 1991 (aged 19)	Academy	2007		0	0
Defenders
2	Andy Griffin	(England)	DF	17 March 1979 (aged 32)	Stoke City	2010		63	0
3	Marcus Williams	(England)	DF	8 April 1986 (aged 25)	Scunthorpe United	2010		5	0
5	Matt Mills (vice-captain)	(England)	DF	14 July 1986 (aged 24)	Doncaster Rovers	2009		75	8
15	Zurab Khizanishvili	(Georgia (country))	DF	6 October 1981 (aged 29)	Blackburn Rovers	2010		42	0
16	Ívar Ingimarsson (club captain)	(Iceland)	DF	20 August 1977 (aged 33)	Wolverhampton Wanderers	2003		280	12
22	Julian Kelly	(England)	DF	6 September 1989 (aged 21)	Academy	2008		13	0
23	Ian Harte	(Republic of Ireland)	DF	31 August 1977 (aged 33)	Carlisle United	2010		47	11
24	Shaun Cummings	(England) (Note: Cummings was born in Hammersmith, England, but qualified to represent Jamaica and made his international debut for Jamaica in September 2013.)	DF	5 August 1989 (aged 21)	Chelsea	2009		20	0
26	Alex Pearce	(Scotland) (Note: Alex Pearce was born in Wallingford, England, but also qualified to represent Scotland and the Republic of Ireland internationally through his parents and has represented Scotland at youth and U-21 level. He would, however, later be called up and make his full international debut for the Republic of Ireland in September 2012.)	DF	9 November 1988 (aged 22)	Academy	2006		77	7
28	Sean Morrison	(England)	DF	8 January 1991 (aged 20)	Swindon Town	2010		0	0
34	Ethan Gage	(Canada)	DF	8 May 1991 (aged 20)	Vancouver Whitecaps	2010		0	0
35	Michael Hector	(England) (Note: Hector was born in East Ham, England, but qualified to represent Jamaica and made his international debut for Jamaica in June 2015.)	DF	19 July 1992 (aged 18)	Academy	2010		0	0
36	Jack Mills	(England)	DF	26 March 1992 (aged 19)	Academy	2010		0	0
Midfielders
4	Jem Karacan	(Turkey) (Note: Jem Karacan was born in Lewisham, England, but also qualifies to represent Turkey internationally through his father and has represented Turkey at every youth level.)	MF	21 February 1989 (aged 22)	Academy	2007		96	5
6	Brynjar Gunnarsson	(Iceland)	MF	16 October 1975 (aged 35)	Watford	2005		158	10
7	Jay Tabb	(Republic of Ireland) (Note: Jay Tabb was born in Tooting, England, but also qualified to represent the Republic of Ireland internationally, and represented Ireland at U-21 level in 2005.)	MF	21 February 1984 (aged 27)	Coventry City	2009	2011	68	0
8	Mikele Leigertwood	(Antigua and Barbuda) (Note: Leigertwood was born in Enfield, England, but qualified to represent Antigua and Barbuda and made his international debut for Antigua and Barbuda in November 2008.)	MF	12 November 1982 (aged 28)	on loan from Queens Park Rangers	2010	2011	29	2
11	Jobi McAnuff	(Jamaica) (Note: McAnuff was born in Enfield, England, but qualified to represent Jamaica and made his international debut for Jamaica in May 2002.)	MF	9 November 1981 (aged 29)	Watford	2009	2012	88	8
14	Jimmy Kébé	(Mali) (Note: Jimmy Kébé was born in Vitry-sur-Seine, France, but qualified to represent Mali internationally and made his international debut for Mali in 2004.)	MF	19 January 1984 (aged 27)	Lens	2008	2010	138	23
17	Michail Antonio	(England) (Note: Michail Antonio was born in Wandsworth, England, but also qualified to represent Jamaica internationally, going on to make his debut for Jamaica in 2021.)	MF	8 January 1989 (aged 22)	Tooting & Mitcham United	2008	2010	26	1
19	Hal Robson-Kanu	(England) (Note: Hal Robson-Kanu was born in Ealing, England, and represented England at U-19 and U-20 level, but also qualified to represent Wales through his grandmother and made his international debut for the Welsh U-21 side in May 2010 before making his full international debut for Wales five days later.)	MF	21 May 1989 (aged 22)	Academy	2007		52	6
20	Brian Howard	(England)	MF	23 January 1983 (aged 28)	Sheffield United	2009	2012	67	3
25	Jake Taylor	(Wales) (Note: Taylor was born in Ascot, England, and but chose to represent Wales, qualifying through his grandfather who has born in Barry. Taylor has represented Wales at U-17, U-19 and U-21 level.)	MF	22 December 1990 (aged 20)	Academy	2009		2	0
27	Scott Davies	(Republic of Ireland) (Note: Scott Davies was born in Aylesbury, England, but also qualified to represent the Republic of Ireland internationally and has represented them at youth and U-21 level.)	MF	9 July 1987 (aged 23)	Academy	2004		5	0
37	Jordan Obita	(England) (Note: Obita was born in Oxford, England, but qualified to represent Uganda and made his international debut for Uganda in June 2025.)	MF	8 December 1993 (aged 17)	Academy	2010		1	0
38	James Rowe	(England)	MF	21 October 1991 (aged 19)	Academy	2010		0	0
40	Lawson D'Ath	(England)	MF	24 December 1992 (aged 18)	Academy	2010		0	0
44	Danny Joyce	(Republic of Ireland)	MF	5 June 1992 (aged 18)	Academy	2010		0	0
	Erik Opsahl	(United States)	MF	18 July 1992 (aged 18)	Academy	2010		0	0
Forwards
9	Shane Long	(Republic of Ireland)	FW	22 January 1987 (aged 24)	Cork City	2005		203	52
10	Noel Hunt	(Republic of Ireland)	FW	26 December 1982 (aged 28)	Dundee United	2008	2011	91	25
12	Dave Mooney	(Republic of Ireland)	FW	30 October 1984 (aged 26)	Cork City	2008	2011	4	2
18	Simon Church	(Wales) (Note: Simon Church was born in High Wycombe, England, but also qualifies to represent Wales through his grandparents and made his international debut for the Welsh U-21 side in August 2007 before making his full international debut for Wales in May 2009.)	FW	10 December 1988 (aged 22)	Academy	2007		88	17
29	Nicholas Bignall	(England)	FW	11 July 1990 (aged 20)	Academy	2008		4	2
30	Abdulai Bell-Baggie	(England) (Note: Bell-Baggie was born in Sierra Leone, but qualified to represent England, representing the U-16's and U-17's before making his debut for Sierra Leone in June 2013.)	FW	28 April 1992 (aged 19)	Academy	2009		0	0
32	Jacob Walcott	(England)	FW	29 June 1992 (aged 18)	Academy	2010		0	0
39	Brett Williams	(England)	FW	1 December 1987 (aged 23)	Eastleigh	2011		0	0
45	Mathieu Manset	(France)	FW	5 August 1989 (aged 21)	Hereford United	2011		14	2
	Daniel Carr	(England) (Note: Daniel Carr was born in Lambeth, England, but also qualified to represent Trinidad and Tobago internationally, going on to make his debut for Trinidad and Tobago in 2019.)	FW	29 May 1994 (aged 17)	Academy	2010		0	0
Out on loan
Left during the season
3	Chris Armstrong	(Scotland) (Note: Chris Armstrong was born in Newcastle upon Tyne, England, but qualified to represent Scotland internationally through his grandmother, making his international debut for Scotland B in 2007.)	DF	5 August 1982 (aged 28)	Sheffield United	2008		49	1
8	Gylfi Sigurðsson	(Iceland)	MF	8 September 1989 (aged 21)	Academy	2008		51	22
23	Grzegorz Rasiak	(Poland)	FW	12 January 1979 (aged 32)	Southampton	2009	2011	36	9

== Transfers ==
=== In ===
Date	Position	Nationality	Name	From	Fee	Ref.
11 May 2010	DF	(England)	Marcus Williams	Scunthorpe United	Free	
1 July 2010	DF	(England)	Andy Griffin	Stoke City	£250,000	
31 August 2010	DF	(Republic of Ireland)	Ian Harte	Carlisle United	Undisclosed	
18 January 2011	DF	(England)	Sean Morrison	Swindon Town	£250,000	
18 January 2011	FW	(England)	Brett Williams	Eastleigh	£50,000	
21 January 2011	FW	(France)	Mathieu Manset	Hereford United	Undisclosed	
31 January 2011	DF	(Canada)	Ethan Gage	Vancouver Whitecaps	Free	
31 January 2011	MF	(United States)	Erik Opsahl	St John's University	Free	

=== Loans in ===
Start date	Position	Nationality	Name	From	End date	Ref.
31 August 2010	DF	(Georgia (country))	Zurab Khizanishvili	Blackburn Rovers	End of the season	
23 October 2010	MF	(Antigua and Barbuda)	Mikele Leigertwood	Queens Park Rangers	End of the season	

=== Out ===
Date	Position	Nationality	Name	To	Fee	Ref.
13 June 2010	MF	(Czech Republic)	Marek Matějovský	Sparta Prague	£650,000	
9 July 2010	MF	(Mali)	Kalifa Cissé	Bristol City	£400,000	
28 July 2010	MF	(England)	James Henry	Millwall	£200,000	
20 August 2010	FW	(Poland)	Grzegorz Rasiak	AEL Limassol	Free	
31 August 2010	MF	(Iceland)	Gylfi Sigurðsson	1899 Hoffenheim	Undisclosed	

=== Loans out ===
Start date	Position	Nationality	Name	To	End date	Ref.
1 August 2010	GK	(Denmark)	Mikkel Andersen	Bristol Rovers	5 January 2011	
5 August 2010	FW	(Republic of Ireland)	Dave Mooney	Colchester United	End of the season	
13 August 2010	MF	(England)	Abdulai Bell-Baggie	Port Vale	13 September 2010	
13 August 2010	GK	(England)	Alex McCarthy	Brentford	31 August 2010	
21 August 2010	DF	(England)	Michael Hector	Oxford City	21 September 2010	
21 August 2010	DF	(England)	Jack Mills	Oxford City	21 September 2010	
31 August 2010	GK	(England)	Ben Hamer	Brentford	17 January 2011	
10 September 2010	MF	(Republic of Ireland)	Scott Davies	Wycombe Wanderers	10 November 2010	
8 October 2010	FW	(England)	Nicholas Bignall	Southampton	8 November 2010	
7 November 2010	DF	(England)	Michael Hector	Horsham	7 January 2011	
12 November 2010	FW	(England)	Nicholas Bignall	Bournemouth	31 December 2010	
12 November 2010	DF	(England)	Marcus Williams	Peterborough United	31 December 2010	
25 November 2010	MF	(England)	Abdulai Bell-Baggie	Crawley Town	20 January 2011	
25 November 2010	GK	(England)	Simon Locke	Dagenham & Redbridge	28 December 2011	
2 January 2011	MF	(England)	James Rowe	Lewes	2 February 2011	
7 January 2011	GK	(England)	Simon Locke	Basingstoke Town	7 February 2011	
13 January 2011	DF	(England)	Julian Kelly	Lincoln City	End of the season	
19 January 2011	GK	(England)	Ben Hamer	Exeter City	End of the season	
19 January 2011	FW	(England)	Jacob Walcott	Telstar	End of the season	
28 January 2011	MF	(Republic of Ireland)	Scott Davies	Bristol Rovers	End of the season	
31 January 2011	FW	(England)	Nicholas Bignall	Brentford	End of the season	
2 February 2011	DF	(England)	Michael Hector	Dundalk	30 June 2011	
2 February 2011	DF	(England)	Jack Mills	Telstar	End of the season	
15 February 2011	MF	(Republic of Ireland)	Danny Joyce	Bohemians	30 June 2011	
23 March 2011	DF	(England)	Sean Morrison	Huddersfield Town	End of the season	
24 March 2011	DF	(England)	Marcus Williams	Scunthorpe United	End of the season	

=== Released ===
Date	Position	Nationality	Name	Joined	Date	Ref
8 March 2011	DF	(Scotland)	Chris Armstrong	Retired		
2 June 2011	MF	(England)	Abdulai Bell-Baggie	Yeovil Town	August 2011	
2 June 2011	DF	(Iceland)	Ívar Ingimarsson	Ipswich Town	13 June 2011	
2 June 2011	MF	(Republic of Ireland)	Danny Joyce	Bohemian	January 2012	
2 June 2011	FW	(Republic of Ireland)	David Mooney	Leyton Orient	23 July 2011	
2 June 2011	MF	(United States)	Erik Opsahl	Dalkurd FF	1 September 2011	
2 June 2011	MF	(England)	James Rowe	Forest Green Rovers	2 August 2011	

== Competitions ==
=== Overall record ===
Competition	First match	Last match	Starting round	Final position	Record							
Competition	First match	Last match	Starting round	Final position	Pld	W	D	L	GF	GA	GD	Win %
Championship	7 August 2010	7 May 2011	Matchday 1	5th	46	20	17	9	77	51	+26	43.48
Championship Playoffs	13 May 2011	30 May 2011	Semifinal	Runners-up	3	1	1	1	5	4	+1	33.33
FA Cup	8 January 2011	13 March 2011	Third round	Quarterfinal	4	3	0	1	4	2	+2	75.00
League Cup	11 August 2011	24 August 2011	First round	Second round	2	1	1	0	4	3	+1	50.00
Total					55	25	19	11	90	60	+30	45.45

Last updated: 30 May 2011
Source: Soccerway

=== Championship ===
==== Results summary ====
Overall								Home						Away					
Pld	W	D	L	GF	GA	GD	Pts	W	D	L	GF	GA	GD	W	D	L	GF	GA	GD
46	20	17	9	77	47	+30	77	12	7	4	43	21	+22	8	10	5	34	26	+8

Last updated: 7 May 2011.
Source: Reading FC

==== Matches ====
7 August 2010 1	Reading	1–2	Scunthorpe United	Madejski Stadium
15:00 BST (UTC+1)	Sigurðsson 26'	Report	Thompson 9'; Jones 60'	Attendance: 15,914

14 August 2010 2	Portsmouth	1–1	Reading	Fratton Park
15:00 BST (UTC+1)	Çiftçi 8'	Report	Kébé 86'	Attendance: 16,497

21 August 2010 3	Reading	1–1	Nottingham Forest	Madejski Stadium
15:00 BST (UTC+1)	Pearce 16'	Report	Earnshaw 49'	Attendance: 17,324

28 August 2010 4	Leicester City	1–2	Reading	Walkers Stadium
17:20 BST (UTC+1)	Dyer 52'	Report	Sigurðsson 23'; Mills 86'	Attendance: 19,611

11 September 2010 5	Reading	3–0	Crystal Palace	Madejski Stadium
15:00 BST (UTC+1)	Long 37' (pen.); Harte 65' (pen.); Kébé 90'	Report		Attendance: 17,921

14 September 2010 6	Millwall	0–0	Reading	The Den
19:45 BST (UTC+1)		Report		Attendance: 11,061

18 September 2010 7	Middlesbrough	3–1	Reading	Riverside Stadium
15:00 BST (UTC+1)	Robson 1'; Lita 41'; Wheater 67'	Report	Kébé 44'	Attendance: 15,158

25 September 2010 8	Reading	3–0	Barnsley	Madejski Stadium
15:00 BST (UTC+1)	Kébé 78'; Harte 90'; Robson-Kanu 90'	Report		Attendance: 14,830

28 September 2010 9	Reading	1–0	Ipswich Town	Madejski Stadium
19:45 BST (UTC+1)	Church 88'	Report		Attendance: 15,763

2 October 2010 10	Preston North End	1–1	Reading	Deepdale
15:00 BST (UTC+1)	Treacy 22'	Report	Karacan 50'	Attendance: 10,269

16 October 2010 11	Reading	0–1	Swansea City	Madejski Stadium
15:00 BST (UTC+1)		Report	Sinclair 35'	Attendance: 18,418

19 October 2010 12	Bristol City	1–0	Reading	Ashton Gate
19:45 BST (UTC+1)	Haynes 29'	Report		Attendance: 13,519

23 October 2010 13	Burnley	0–4	Reading	Turf Moor
15:00 BST (UTC+1)		Report	Long 8' (pen.); McAnuff 64'; Antonio 85'; Church 90'	Attendance: 14,895

30 October 2010 14	Reading	4–3	Doncaster Rovers	Madejski Stadium
15:00 BST (UTC+1)	Mills 10'; Karacan 59'; Harte 73'; Church 88'	Report	Hayter 25'; Martis 41'; Shiels 47'	Attendance: 15,553

6 November 2010 15	Queens Park Rangers	3–1	Reading	Loftus Road
15:00 GMT	Taarabt 26' (pen.); Faurlín 61'; Smith 71'	Report	Long 68'	Attendance: 15,692

10 November 2010 16	Reading	1–1	Cardiff City	Madejski Stadium
20:00 GMT	Hunt 5'	Report	Bothroyd 79'	Attendance: 17,960

13 November 2010 17	Reading	3–3	Norwich City	Madejski Stadium
17:20 GMT	Harte 29'; Hunt 59'; Long 62' (pen.)	Report	R. Martin 16'; Holt 26'; C.Martin 32'	Attendance: 15,934

20 November 2010 18	Watford	1–1	Reading	Vicarage Road
15:00 GMT	Deeney 40'	Report	Hunt 15'	Attendance: 12,196

27 November 2010 19	Reading	0–0	Leeds United	Madejski Stadium
15:00 GMT		Report		Attendance: 23,677

11 December 2010 20	Reading	0–0	Coventry City	Madejski Stadium
15:00 GMT		Report		Attendance: 14,029

18 December 2010 21	Derby County	1–2	Reading	Pride Park Stadium
15:00 GMT	Commons 61'	Report	Long 43' (pen.), 88'	Attendance: 24,514

26 December 2010 22	Reading	4–1	Bristol City	Madejski Stadium
15:00 GMT	McAnuff 31'; Hunt 43'; Long 66', 89'	Report	Stead 15'	Attendance: 19,293

28 December 2010 23	Hull City	1–1	Reading	KC Stadium
15:00 GMT	Harper 39'	Report	Church 81'	Attendance: 21,975

1 January 2011 24	Swansea City	1–0	Reading	Liberty Stadium
15:00 GMT	Pratley 66'	Report		Attendance: 14,329

3 January 2011 25	Reading	2–1	Burnley	Madejski Stadium
15:00 GMT	Long 31', 68'	Report	Wallace 29'	Attendance: 16,151

15 January 2011 26	Doncaster Rovers	0–3	Reading	Keepmoat Stadium
15:00 GMT		Report	Long 29'; Kébé 67'; McAnuff 74'	Attendance: 9,496

22 January 2011 27	Reading	1–1	Hull City	Madejski Stadium
15:00 GMT	Harte 80' (pen.)	Report	Evans 51'	Attendance: 16,494

2 February 2011 28	Cardiff City	2–2	Reading	Cardiff City Stadium
19:45 GMT	Bothroyd 48'; Bellamy 90+7'	Report	Leigertwood 21'; Manset 90+2'	Attendance: 21,405

4 February 2011 29	Reading	0–1	Queens Park Rangers	Madejski Stadium
19:45 GMT		Report	Routledge 83'; Ephraim (red card) 42'	Attendance: 18,982

12 February 2011 30	Norwich City	2–1	Reading	Carrow Road
15:00 GMT	Lansbury 16'; Holt 90+4'	Report	Long 26'; Karacan (red card) 65'	Attendance: 25,560

15 February 2011 31	Sheffield United	1–1	Reading	Bramall Lane
19:45 GMT	Bogdanović 88' (pen.)	Report	Long 81'	Attendance: 19,271

19 February 2011 32	Reading	1–1	Watford	Madejski Stadium
15:00 GMT	Hunt 50'	Report	Weimann 27'	Attendance: 16,934

22 February 2011 33	Reading	2–1	Millwall	Madejski Stadium
20:00 GMT	Hunt 3'; Long 55'	Report	Harris 46'	Attendance: 15,934

26 February 2011 34	Crystal Palace	3–3	Reading	Selhurst Park
15:00 GMT	Ambrose 1'; Danns 25'; Easter 63'	Report	Long 30' (pen.); Kébé 49'; Hunt 73'	Attendance: 13,845

5 March 2011 35	Reading	5–2	Middlesbrough	Madejski Stadium
15:00 GMT	Robson-Kanu 14'; Harte 35', 48'; Long 53', 68'	Report	Lita 29', 72' (pen.)	Attendance: 18,568

8 March 2011 36	Ipswich Town	1–3	Reading	Portman Road
19:45 GMT	Wickham 90+3'	Report	Long 18'; Harte 86'; Hunt 89'	Attendance: 17,308

19 March 2011 37	Barnsley	0–1	Reading	Oakwell
15:00 GMT		Report	Manset 71'	Attendance: 10,284

2 April 2011 38	Reading	2–0	Portsmouth	Madejski Stadium
15:00 BST (UTC+1)	Long 30', 37' (pen.)	Report		Attendance: 21,896

5 April 2011 39	Reading	2–1	Preston North End	Madejski Stadium
20:00 BST (UTC+1)	Kébé 20'; Robson-Kanu 81'	Report	McCarthy 51' (o.g.)	Attendance: 14,844

9 April 2011 40	Nottingham Forest	3–4	Reading	City Ground
15:00 BST (UTC+1)	Kris Boyd 37' (pen.); Earnshaw 50'; McGugan 88' (pen.)	Report	Harte 20'; Karacan 53'; Kébé 61'; Church 90+1'	Attendance: 22,495

12 April 2011 41	Scunthorpe United	0–2	Reading	Glanford Park
19:45 BST (UTC+1)		[Report]	Long 57'; Harte 63' (pen.)	Attendance: 4,458

16 April 2011 42	Reading	3–1	Leicester City	Madejski Stadium
15:00 BST (UTC+1)	Kébé 19'; McAnuff 21'; Hunt 67'	Report	King 79'	Attendance: 19,199

22 April 2011 43	Leeds United	0–0	Reading	Elland Road
19:45 BST (UTC+1)		Report		Attendance: 24,564

25 April 2011 44	Reading	2–3	Sheffield United	Madejski Stadium
15:00 BST (UTC+1)	Hunt 8'; Robson-Kanu 17'	Report	Henderson 29', 50'; Williamson 45'	Attendance: 19,165

30 April 2011 45	Coventry City	0–0	Reading	Ricoh Arena
15:00 BST (UTC+1)		Report		Attendance: 22,436

7 May 2011 46	Reading	2–1	Derby County	Madejski Stadium
12:45 BST (UTC+1)	Harte 24' (pen.); Robson-Kanu 72'	Report	Ward 32'	Attendance: 21,902

==== Playoffs ====
===== Semi-finals =====
13 May 2011 1st Leg	Reading	0–0	Cardiff City	Madejski Stadium
19:45 BST (UTC)		Report		Attendance: 21,485; Referee: Mark Halsey

17 May 2011 2nd Leg	Cardiff City	0–3 (0–3 agg.)	Reading	Cardiff City Stadium
19:45 BST (UTC)		Report	Long 28', 45' (pen.); McAnuff 84'	Attendance: 24,081; Referee: Howard Webb

===== Final =====
30 May 2011	Reading	2–4	Swansea City	Wembley Stadium, London
15:00 BST (UTC)	Allen 49' (o.g.); Mills 57'	Report	Sinclair 21' (pen.), 22', 80' (pen.); Dobbie 40'	Attendance: 86,581; Referee: Phil Dowd

Reading	Swansea City

READING:
GK	1	(Australia) Adam Federici
RB	2	(England) Andy Griffin	(yellow card) 8'	(substituted off) 84'
CB	5	(England) Matt Mills (c)
CB	15	(Georgia (country)) Zurab Khizanishvili	(yellow card) 12'
LB	23	(Republic of Ireland) Ian Harte
CM	4	(Turkey) Jem Karacan
CM	8	(Antigua and Barbuda) Mikele Leigertwood
RW	14	(Mali) Jimmy Kébé
LW	11	(Jamaica) Jobi McAnuff	(yellow card) 39'
CF	9	(Republic of Ireland) Shane Long
CF	10	(Republic of Ireland) Noel Hunt		(substituted off) 76'
Substitutes:
GK	41	(England) Alex McCarthy
DF	24	(England) Shaun Cummings
DF	26	(Scotland) Alex Pearce
MF	7	(Republic of Ireland) Jay Tabb	(red card) HT
MF	19	(Wales) Hal Robson-Kanu		(substituted on) 84'
MF	20	(England) Brian Howard
FW	18	(Wales) Simon Church		(substituted on) 76'
Manager:
(England) Brian McDermott

SWANSEA CITY:
GK	1	(Netherlands) Dorus de Vries
RB	22	(Spain) Àngel Rangel
CB	16	(England) Garry Monk (c)
CB	2	(Wales) Ashley Williams
LB	5	(England) Alan Tate
CM	37	(England) Leon Britton		(substituted off) 77'
CM	24	(Wales) Joe Allen	(yellow card) 54'	(substituted off) 89'
RW	12	(England) Nathan Dyer
AM	14	(Scotland) Stephen Dobbie		(substituted off) 55'
LW	21	(England) Scott Sinclair
CF	15	(Italy) Fabio Borini	(yellow card) 12'
Substitutes:
GK	25	(Democratic Republic of the Congo) Yves Ma-Kalambay
DF	17	(Spain) Albert Serrán
MF	8	(England) Darren Pratley		(substituted on) 55'
MF	27	(England) Mark Gower	(yellow card) 82'	(substituted on) 77'
MF	29	(Wales) Ashley Richards
FW	9	(Scotland) Craig Beattie
FW	19	(England) Luke Moore		(substituted on) 89'
Manager:
(Northern Ireland) Brendan Rodgers

MATCH OFFICIALS

- Assistant referees:
  - Scott Ledger
  - Simon Long
- Fourth official: Lee Mason
- Reserve referee: Andrew Halliday

MATCH RULES

- 90 minutes.
- 30 minutes of extra-time if necessary.
- Penalty shoot-out if scores still level.
- Seven named substitutes.
- Maximum of three substitutions.

==== League table ====
Pos	Team	Pld	W	D	L	GF	GA	GD	Pts	Promotion, qualification or relegation
3	Swansea City (O, P)	46	24	8	14	69	42	+27	80	Qualification for Championship play-offs
4	Cardiff City	46	23	11	12	76	54	+22	80	Qualification for Championship play-offs
5	Reading	46	20	17	9	77	51	+26	77	Qualification for Championship play-offs
6	Nottingham Forest	46	20	15	11	69	50	+19	75	Qualification for Championship play-offs
7	Leeds United	46	19	15	12	81	70	+11	72	

Updated to match(es) played on 7 May 2011. Source: The Football League
Rules for classification: 1) points; 2) goal difference; 3) number of goals scored.
(O) Play-off winners; (P) Promoted

=== League Cup ===
11 August 2010 First round	Torquay United	0–1 (a.e.t.)	Reading	Plainmoor
19:45 BST (UTC)		Report	Rasiak 120'	Attendance: 2,832

24 August 2010 Second round	Reading	3–3 (a.e.t.) (2–4 p)	Northampton Town	Madejski Stadium
20:00 BST (UTC)	Mills 15', 113'; Robson-Kanu 62'	Report	Holt 20'; Thornton 64'; Mills 120' (o.g.)	Attendance: 6,986
	Penalties
	Church (penalty missed); Long (penalty scored); Robson-Kanu (penalty scored); Taylor (penalty missed)		Guinan (penalty scored); Thornton (penalty scored); Jacobs (penalty scored); Osman (penalty scored)

=== FA Cup ===
8 January 2011 Third round	Reading	1–0	West Bromwich Albion	Madejski Stadium
15:00 GMT	Long 41'	Report		Attendance: 13,005

29 January 2011 Fourth round	Stevenage	1–2	Reading	Broadhall Way
15:00 GMT	Charles 72'	Report	Leigertwood 23'; Long 87'	Attendance: 6,614

1 March 2011 Fifth round	Everton	0–1	Reading	Goodison Park
19:30 GMT		Report	Mills 26'	Attendance: 29,976

13 March 2011 Quarter-Final	Manchester City	1–0	Reading	City of Manchester Stadium
16:45 GMT	Richards 74'	Report		Attendance: 41,150

== Squad statistics ==
=== Appearances and goals ===
As of match played 30 May 2011

No.	Pos	Nat	Player	Total		Championship		Playoffs		FA Cup		League Cup	
No.	Pos	Nat	Player	Apps	Goals	Apps	Goals	Apps	Goals	Apps	Goals	Apps	Goals
1	GK	(Australia) AUS	Adam Federici	39	0	34	0	3	0	2	0	0	0
2	DF	(England) ENG	Andy Griffin	38	0	33	0	3	0	1	0	1	0
3	DF	(England) ENG	Marcus Williams	5	0	3	0	0	0	0	0	2	0
4	MF	(Turkey) TUR	Jem Karacan	48	3	39+1	3	3	0	3	0	1+1	0
5	DF	(England) ENG	Matt Mills	45	6	38	2	3	1	3	1	1	2
6	MF	(Iceland) ISL	Brynjar Gunnarsson	15	0	10+2	0	0	0	2	0	1	0
7	MF	(Republic of Ireland) IRL	Jay Tabb	25	0	15+6	0	0+1	0	2	0	1	0
8	MF	(Antigua and Barbuda) ANT	Mikele Leigertwood	29	2	21+1	1	3	0	4	1	0	0
9	FW	(Republic of Ireland) IRL	Shane Long	52	25	44	21	3	2	4	2	0+1	0
10	FW	(Republic of Ireland) IRL	Noel Hunt	40	10	19+14	10	3	0	3	0	1	0
11	MF	(Jamaica) JAM	Jobi McAnuff	47	5	40	4	3	1	4	0	0	0
14	MF	(Mali) MLI	Jimmy Kébé	42	9	34+2	9	1	0	3	0	1+1	0
15	DF	(Georgia (country)) GEO	Zurab Khizanishvili	27	0	21+1	0	3	0	2	0	0	0
16	DF	(Iceland) ISL	Ívar Ingimarsson	14	0	12+1	0	0	0	1	0	0	0
17	MF	(England) ENG	Michail Antonio	24	1	2+19	1	0	0	0+1	0	2	0
18	FW	(Wales) WAL	Simon Church	44	5	14+23	5	0+2	0	1+3	0	1	0
19	MF	(Wales) WAL	Hal Robson-Kanu	34	6	12+15	5	1+1	0	1+3	0	1	1
20	MF	(England) ENG	Brian Howard	28	0	19+5	0	0+1	0	0+1	0	2	0
21	GK	(England) ENG	Ben Hamer	2	0	0	0	0	0	0	0	2	0
22	DF	(England) ENG	Julian Kelly	1	0	0	0	0	0	0	0	1	0
23	DF	(Republic of Ireland) IRL	Ian Harte	47	11	40	11	3	0	4	0	0	0
24	DF	(England) ENG	Shaun Cummings	12	0	10	0	1	0	1	0	0	0
25	MF	(Wales) WAL	Jake Taylor	2	0	0+1	0	0	0	0	0	0+1	0
26	DF	(Scotland) SCO	Alex Pearce	24	1	20+1	1	0	0	1	0	2	0
29	FW	(England) ENG	Nicholas Bignall	1	0	0	0	0	0	0	0	1	0
37	MF	(England) ENG	Jordan Obita	1	0	0	0	0	0	0	0	0+1	0
41	GK	(England) ENG	Alex McCarthy	15	0	12+1	0	0	0	2	0	0	0
45	FW	(France) FRA	Mathieu Manset	14	2	4+9	2	0+1	0	0	0	0	0
Players who appeared for Reading but left during the season:
8	FW	(Iceland) ISL	Gylfi Sigurðsson	4	2	4	2	0	0	0	0	0	0
23	FW	(Poland) POL	Grzegorz Rasiak	2	1	0+1	0	0	0	0	0	1	1
33	DF	(Scotland) SCO	Chris Armstrong	7	0	6+1	0	0	0	0	0	0	0

=== Top scorers ===
As of match played 30 May 2011

Place	Position	Nation	Number	Name	Championship	Playoff	FA Cup	League Cup	Total
1	FW	(Republic of Ireland)	9	Shane Long	21	2	2	0	25
2	DF	(Republic of Ireland)	23	Ian Harte	11	0	0	0	11
3	FW	(Republic of Ireland)	10	Noel Hunt	10	0	0	0	10
4	MF	(Mali)	14	Jimmy Kébé	9	0	0	0	9
5	MF	(Wales)	19	Hal Robson-Kanu	5	0	0	1	6
5	DF	(England)	5	Matt Mills	2	1	1	2	6
7	MF	(Jamaica)	11	Jobi McAnuff	4	1	0	0	5
7	FW	(Wales)	18	Simon Church	5	0	0	0	5
9	MF	(Turkey)	4	Jem Karacan	3	0	0	0	3
10	MF	(Iceland)	8	Gylfi Sigurðsson	2	0	0	0	2
10	FW	(France)	22	Mathieu Manset	2	0	0	0	2
10	MF	(Antigua and Barbuda)	8	Mikele Leigertwood	1	0	1	0	2
13	DF	(Scotland)	5	Alex Pearce	1	0	0	0	1
13	MF	(England)	17	Michail Antonio	1	0	0	0	1
13				Own goal	0	1	0	0	1
13	FW	(Poland)	23	Grzegorz Rasiak	0	0	0	1	1
Total					77	5	4	4	90

=== Disciplinary record ===
As of match played 30 May 2011

Position	Nation	Number	Name	Championship		Play-offs		FA Cup		League Cup		Total	
Position	Nation	Number	Name	Yellow card	Red card	Yellow card	Red card	Yellow card	Red card	Yellow card	Red card	Yellow card	Red card
DF	(England)	5	Matt Mills	9	1	1	0	0	0	1	0	11	1
MF	(Turkey)	4	Jem Karacan	6	1	0	0	0	0	0	0	6	1
DF	(England)	2	Andy Griffin	6	0	1	0	0	0	0	0	7	0
MF	(Jamaica)	11	Jobi McAnuff	5	0	2	0	0	0	0	0	7	0
MF	(England)	20	Brian Howard	4	1	0	0	0	0	1	0	5	1
MF	(Mali)	14	Jimmy Kébé	6	0	0	0	0	0	0	0	6	0
FW	(Republic of Ireland)	9	Shane Long	4	0	1	0	1	0	0	0	6	0
DF	(Georgia (country))	15	Zurab Khizanishvili	2	1	1	0	1	0	0	0	4	1
FW	(Republic of Ireland)	10	Noel Hunt	5	0	0	0	0	0	0	0	5	0
DF	(Scotland)	33	Chris Armstrong	4	0	0	0	0	0	0	0	4	0
MF	(Iceland)	6	Brynjar Gunnarsson	2	0	0	0	0	0	1	0	3	0
MF	(Antigua and Barbuda)	8	Mikele Leigertwood	2	0	0	0	1	0	0	0	3	0
DF	(Scotland)	26	Alex Pearce	3	0	0	0	0	0	0	0	3	0
MF	(Republic of Ireland)	7	Jay Tabb	1	0	0	1	0	0	0	0	1	1
MF	(England)	17	Michail Antonio	2	0	0	0	0	0	0	0	2	0
DF	(England)	24	Shaun Cummings	2	0	0	0	0	0	0	0	2	0
FW	(Wales)	18	Simon Church	1	0	0	0	0	0	0	0	1	0
GK	(Australia)	1	Adam Federici	1	0	0	0	0	0	0	0	1	0
DF	(Republic of Ireland)	23	Ian Harte	1	0	0	0	0	0	0	0	1	0
GK	(England)	41	Alex McCarthy	1	0	0	0	0	0	0	0	1	0
MF	(Wales)	19	Hal Robson-Kanu	1	0	0	0	0	0	0	0	1	0
DF	(England)	3	Marcus Williams	0	0	0	0	0	0	1	0	1	0
Total				68	4	6	1	3	0	4	0	81	5

== Awards ==
=== Player of the season ===
Rank	Name
1	(Republic of Ireland) Shane Long
2	(Mali) Jimmy Kébé
3	(Turkey) Jem Karacan

=== Player of the Month ===
Month	Name	Award
January	(Republic of Ireland) Shane Long	Nominated
March	(Republic of Ireland) Ian Harte	Won

=== Manager of the Month ===
Month	Name	Award
January	Brian McDermott	Nominated
March	Brian McDermott	Nominated
April	Brian McDermott	Won

=== Team of the Week ===
Week	Position	Player
Week 28	DF	(Republic of Ireland) Ian Harte
Week 28	ST	(Republic of Ireland) Shane Long
Week 30	DF	(Iceland) Ívar Ingimarsson
Week 32	DF	(Republic of Ireland) Ian Harte
Week 34	MF	(Mali) Jimmy Kébé
Week 36	GK	(Australia) Adam Federici

== Team kit ==
The 2010–11 Reading F.C. kits.

Supplier: Puma
Sponsor(s): Waitrose

Home colours	Away colours	Third colours
