= Jack Mills (English footballer) =

English footballer

Personal information
- Full name: Jack Ian Andrew Mills
- Date of birth: 26 March 1992 (age 34)
- Place of birth: Reading, England
- Height: 6 ft 0 in (1.83 m)
- Positions: Defender; midfielder

Team information
- Current team: Virginia Water FC
- Number: 10

Youth career
- 2008–2010: Reading

Senior career*
Years	Team	Apps	(Gls)
2010–2012	Reading	0	(0)
2010	→ Oxford City (loan)	5	(0)
2011	→ Telstar (loan)	7	(0)
2012–2013	Oxford City	21	(2)
2013	Staines Town	18	(1)
2013–2014	Hayes & Yeading United	40	(3)
2014	Wealdstone	12	(0)
2014–2015	Hayes & Yeading United	3	(0)

International career
2010	England U19	2	(0)
- * Club domestic league appearances and goals as of 17:02, 16 January 2014 (UTC)

Jack Andrew Ian Mills (born 26 March 1992) is an English footballer who plays as a defender or midfielder.

== Club career ==
Mills came through the Reading Academy, signing professional forms with the club in summer 2010. He was loaned out to Oxford City in August 2010 and Dutch side Telstar in January 2011 where he made seven appearances in the Eerste Divisie. He was released by Reading at the end of the 2011–12 season having not made a senior appearance for the club. (Note: Soccerbase incorrectly credits Mills with two appearances for Reading that should instead be attributed to Joseph Mills as shown by the match reports at the official Reading F.C. website.)

In August 2012 he trialled for Bradford City though the club opted not to sign him on a permanent basis. Later that month he signed for Conference North side Oxford City. Mills remained with Oxford until January 2013 when he moved to Staines Town though he was released at the end of the season. He made a total 39 league appearances for both sides during the 2012–13 season.

In July 2013, Mills joined Hayes & Yeading United on trial and featured in four pre-season fixtures before signing a permanent deal in August. He made his debut in a 2–0 home defeat to Bromley on 17 August and scored his first goal for the club a month later against Havant & Waterlooville.

In 2014, he signed for Wealdstone, but returned to Hayes & Yeading United later in the year.

== International career ==
Mills was made two appearances for the England under-19s in 2010, playing against Slovakia and Albania.

== Career statistics ==
As of match played 11 January 2014.

Appearances and goals by club, season and competition
Club	Season	League			FA Cup		League Cup		Other		Total	
Club	Season	Division	Apps	Goals	Apps	Goals	Apps	Goals	Apps	Goals	Apps	Goals
Reading	2010–11	Championship	0	0	0	0	0	0	0	0	0	0
Reading	2011–12	Championship	0	0	0	0	0	0	—		0	0
Reading	Total		0	0	0	0	0	0	0	0	0	0
Oxford City (loan)	2010–11	Southern Premier	5	0	0	0	—		1 (Note: Appearance(s) in the FA Trophy)	0	6	0
Telstar (loan)	2010–11	Eerste Divisie	7	0	0	0	—		—		7	0
Oxford City	2012–13	Conference North	21	2	1	0	—		3	0	25	2
Staines Town	2012–13	Conference South	18	1	0	0	—		0	0	18	1
Hayes & Yeading	2013–14	Conference South	20	1	2	0	—		1	0	23	1
Career total			71	4	3	0	0	0	5	0	79	4
