= Jobi McAnuff =

Jamaican footballer (born 1981)

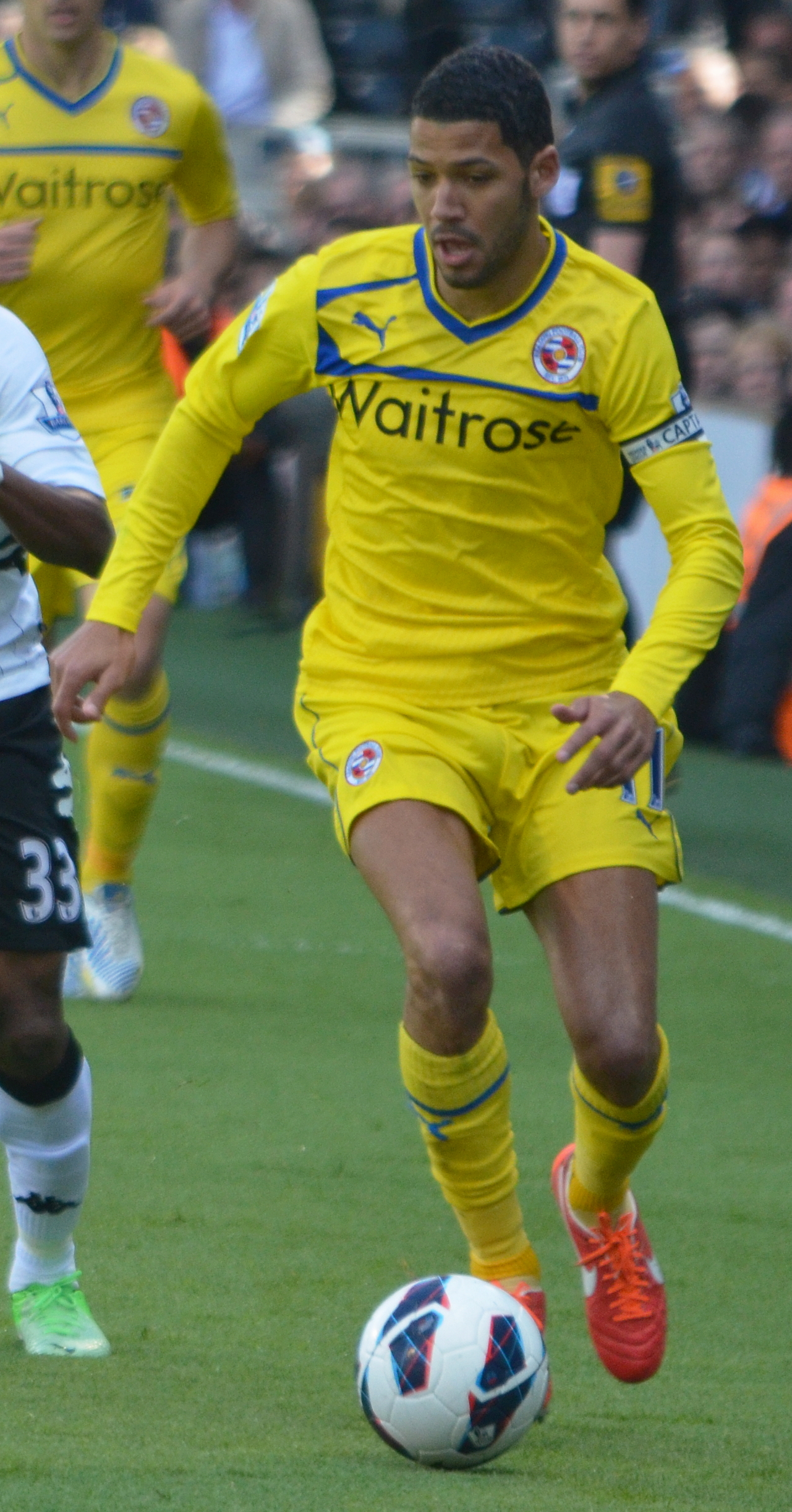
- McAnuff playing for Reading in 2013

Personal information
- Full name: Joel Joshua Frederick Melvin McAnuff
- Date of birth: 9 November 1981 (age 44)
- Place of birth: Edmonton, London, England
- Height: 5 ft 11 in (1.80 m)
- Position: Midfielder

Youth career
- 2000: Wimbledon

Senior career*
Years	Team	Apps	(Gls)
2000–2004	Wimbledon	96	(13)
2004	West Ham United	13	(1)
2004–2005	Cardiff City	43	(2)
2005–2007	Crystal Palace	75	(12)
2007–2009	Watford	82	(5)
2009–2014	Reading	189	(14)
2014–2016	Leyton Orient	51	(6)
2016–2017	Stevenage	31	(4)
2017–2021	Leyton Orient	115	(13)
Total		695	(70)

International career
2002–2016	Jamaica	32	(1)

Managerial career
- 2021: Leyton Orient
Medal record
Men's football
Representing Jamaica
CONCACAF Gold Cup
Runner-up	2015 United States–Canada	Team
- * Club domestic league appearances and goals

Joel Joshua Frederick Melvin "Jobi" McAnuff (born 9 November 1981) is a former footballer. He was predominantly a winger but he has also played as an occasional central midfielder. Since his retirement he has worked as a pundit.

McAnuff began his career at Wimbledon, making over 100 appearances for the club before brief spells at West Ham United and Cardiff City. McAnuff joined Crystal Palace in 2005, spending two years there before moving again, this time to Watford before joining Reading in 2009. He was appointed captain in 2011 and went on to make over 200 appearances in all competition for the Royals. Prior to Reading's promotion to the Premier League in 2011–12 he had spent his entire career playing in England's second tier, amassing over 400 league appearances. He joined Leyton Orient in 2014.

Born in London, McAnuff has represented Jamaica, his father's country of birth, at international level. He made his debut in May 2002 although his next appearance did not come until nearly eleven years later in February 2013. He was part of their squads which won the 2014 Caribbean Cup and competed at the 2015 Copa América.

== Club career ==
=== Early career ===
Born in Edmonton, London, McAnuff made his professional debut in the 2001–02 season with First Division side Wimbledon. He played 104 games and scored 15 goals for the club, staying until Wimbledon's last season, 2003–04. In March 2003, Portsmouth manager Harry Redknapp agreed a deal to bring McAnuff and teammate Nigel Reo-Coker to the south coast club in preparation for their first Premiership season. Financial problems resulted in the player remaining at Wimbledon despite having already signed contracts with Portsmouth.

In the January 2004 transfer window, with Wimbledon now in administration, West Ham manager Alan Pardew signed McAnuff for West Ham United joining fellow former Wimbledon players, Nigel Reo-Coker and Adam Nowland. He played only 14 games for the club, scoring one goal against Crewe. To generate funds for future transfers Pardew was forced to sell McAnuff and on 12 August 2004, he joined Cardiff City for a fee of £250,000 and was virtually ever-present in his first year at the club. He made his debut against Ipswich Town, scoring his first goal against his former side West Ham United during a 4–1 win. He played 48 games and scored 3 goals and picked up numerous player of the month awards. With Cardiff in financial difficulty, McAnuff left the club at the end of the 2004–05 season to join Crystal Palace for a fee of around £600,000.

=== Crystal Palace ===
In his first season at Selhurst Park, McAnuff played 43 games and scored eight goals. His performances in the Championship understandably led to interest from a number of clubs and in the summer of 2006 being linked with moves to Watford, Bolton Wanderers and Charlton Athletic, the latter managed by his former boss at Palace Iain Dowie. However, it was announced during the summer 2006 transfer window that he would stay at Crystal Palace, and play for the Eagles under new boss Peter Taylor.

=== Watford ===
After a less successful 2006–07 campaign, McAnuff moved to Watford in June 2007 in a deal worth an initial £1.75 million.

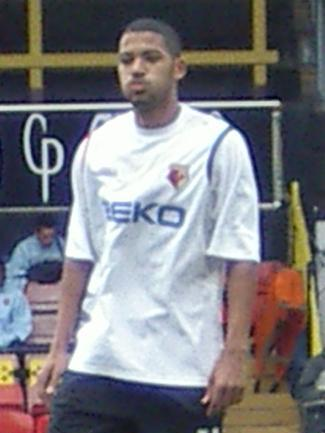
McAnuff playing for Watford in 2008

=== Reading ===
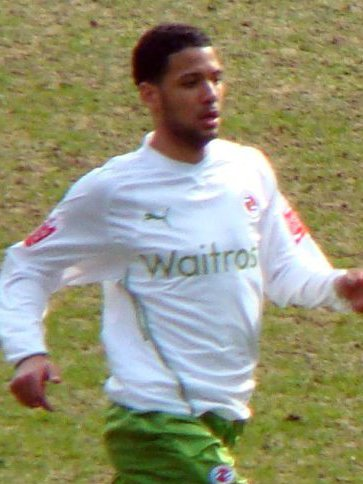
McAnuff playing for Reading in 2010

McAnuff joined Reading on 27 August 2009, then managed by former Watford boss Brendan Rodgers, on a three-year contract for an undisclosed fee. He made his debut against his former club Watford on 26 September 2009 with his first goal coming a month later in a 3–1 win over Coventry City on 31 October.

He scored the third goal against Cardiff City in the 2011 play-off semi-final with a storming run, sealing a 3–0 victory and sending Reading to Wembley for the final against Swansea City. McAnuff started in the final and provided assists for both Reading goals but was unable to prevent them losing the game 4 – 2. Ivar Ingimarsson and Matt Mills both left the club in the months following the play-off final defeat and on 13 July 2011, days after extending his contract until 2014, McAnuff was named as the new Reading captain. On being named captain he paid tribute to his predecessors and described it as a "massive honour".

The 2012–13 season saw McAnuff playing in the Premier League for the first time in his twelve-year career. By 27 November, he had laid on four goals for his teammates, lying joint third in the league assists table. He had to wait until February for his first goal of the season, scoring in Reading's 2–1 FA Cup fifth round defeat to Manchester United at Old Trafford.

He left the club at the end of the 2013–14 season. McAnuff gave an exclusive interview to Get Reading saying he is fine over not getting a renewed contract, though he went on to say: "My time at Reading has been fantastic. It's been a thoroughly enjoyable chapter of my life, a stable one as well. Five seasons is a large chunk of my career. I've captained the club with massive amounts of pride and enjoyment. I've had many great times, the Championship win obviously, and also some bad ones as well. But it's been a fantastic experience. It's a time of my career I'll never forget."

=== Leyton Orient ===
On 25 July 2014, McAnuff signed a two-year deal with League One side Leyton Orient. In May 2016, he was released from Leyton Orient when it was announced that he would not be retained when his contract expired.

McAnuff began trialing with Minnesota United of the North American Soccer League in June 2016. McAnuff made an appearance for Minnesota United in an international friendly against Liga MX side Club León on 25 June 2016 in the first ever football match at Target Field.

=== Stevenage ===
On 19 July 2016 McAnuff signed for League Two team Stevenage on a free transfer.

=== Return to Leyton Orient ===
On 20 July 2017, it was announced that McAnuff would return to Leyton Orient. He captained the side in the 2018–19 season and went on to win the league title. He later signed a further contract extension and moved into a player/coach role.

He was made interim manager of Leyton Orient on 28 February 2021 following the sacking of Ross Embleton. He retired from playing at the end of the 2020–21 season. He was released from his management duties and left the club on 8 May 2021.

== International career ==
Born in England, McAnuff qualifies to play for Jamaica through his Jamaican born father. He made his international debut on 18 May 2002 in the 'Unity Cup', an exhibition game against Nigeria at Loftus Road, coming on as a substitute in the 55th minute replacing Omar Daley. On 24 January 2013, more than ten years after he won his first cap, McAnuff was called up to the Jamaica squad to face Mexico on 7 February alongside fellow Reading players Adrian Mariappa and Garath McCleary. He started the game and helped Jamaica to a 0–0 draw in the Estadio Azteca. McAnuff was in the Jamaican squad which won the 2014 Caribbean Cup on home soil, scoring in the penalty shootout following their goalless draw against Trinidad and Tobago in the final in Montego Bay. At the 2016 Copa América held in the United States he made appearances in all 3 of Jamaica's group games.

== Career statistics ==
=== Club ===
As of match played 2 April 2021

Appearances and goals by club, season and competition
Club	Season	League			FA Cup		League Cup		Other		Total	
Club	Season	Division	Apps	Goals	Apps	Goals	Apps	Goals	Apps	Goals	Apps	Goals
Wimbledon	2001–02	First Division	38	4	2	0	0	0	—		40	4
Wimbledon	2002–03	First Division	31	4	1	1	2	1	—		34	6
Wimbledon	2003–04	First Division	27	5	3	0	0	0	—		30	5
Wimbledon	Total		96	13	6	1	2	1	—		104	15
West Ham United	2003–04	First Division	12	1	—		—		1 (Note: Appearance in the First Division play-offs)	0	13	1
West Ham United	2004–05	Championship	1	0	—		—		—		1	0
West Ham United	Total		13	1	—		—		1	0	14	1
Cardiff City	2004–05	Championship	43	2	2	1	3	0	—		48	3
Crystal Palace	2005–06	Championship	41	7	2	1	2	0	2 (Note: Appearances in the Championship play-offs)	0	47	8
Crystal Palace	2006–07	Championship	34	5	2	1	0	0	—		36	6
Crystal Palace	Total		75	12	4	2	2	0	2	0	83	14
Watford	2007–08	Championship	39	2	2	0	0	0	2	0	43	2
Watford	2008–09	Championship	40	3	3	0	2	0	—		45	3
Watford	2009–10	Championship	3	0	—		1	0	—		4	0
Watford	Total		82	5	5	0	3	0	2	0	92	5
Reading	2009–10	Championship	36	3	5	0	—		—		41	3
Reading	2010–11	Championship	40	4	4	0	0	0	3	1	47	5
Reading	2011–12	Championship	40	5	1	0	1	0	—		42	5
Reading	2012–13	Premier League	38	0	1	1	2	0	—		41	1
Reading	2013–14	Championship	35	2	0	0	0	0	—		35	2
Reading	Total		189	14	11	1	3	0	3	1	206	16
Leyton Orient	2014–15	League One	34	3	0	0	2	0	2 (Note: Appearances in the Football League Trophy)	0	38	3
Leyton Orient	2015–16	League Two	17	3	2	0	0	0	0	0	19	3
Leyton Orient	Total		51	6	2	0	2	0	2	0	57	6
Stevenage	2016–17	League Two	31	4	0	0	2	0	0	0	33	4
Leyton Orient	2017–18	National League	37	6	0	0	—		3 (Note: Appearances in the FA Trophy)	0	40	6
Leyton Orient	2018–19	National League	38	5	1	0	—		4	0	43	5
Leyton Orient	2019–20	League Two	1	0	0	0	0	0	0	0	1	0
Leyton Orient	2020–21	League Two	33	2	1	0	2	1	0	0	36	3
Leyton Orient	Total		109	13	2	0	2	1	7	0	120	14
Career total			689	70	32	5	19	2	17	1	757	78

=== International ===
As of match played 6 September 2016.

Appearances and goals by national team and year
National team	Year	Apps	Goals
Jamaica	2002	1	0
Jamaica	2013	7	0
Jamaica	2014	4	0
Jamaica	2015	12	1
Jamaica	2016	8	0
Total		32	1

=== International goals ===
As of match played 29 March 2016. Jamaica score listed first, score column indicates score after each McAnuff goal.

International goals by date, venue, cap, opponent, score, result and competition
No.	Date	Venue	Cap	Opponent	Score	Result	Competition
1	8 June 2015	StubHub Center, Carson, California, United States	17	Costa Rica	2–2	2–2	2015 CONCACAF Gold Cup

== Managerial statistics ==
As of 8 May 2021

Managerial record by team and tenure
Team	Nat	From	To	Record								Ref
Team	Nat	From	To	G	W	D	L	GF	GA	GD	Win %	Ref
Leyton Orient	(England)	28 February 2021	8 May 2021	16	6	4	6	17	21	−4	37.50	
Total				16	6	4	6	17	21	−4	37.50	—

== Honours ==
Reading

- Football League Championship: 2011–12

Leyton Orient

- National League: 2018–19
- FA Trophy runner-up: 2018–19

Jamaica

- Caribbean Cup: 2014

Individual

- National League Team of the Year: 2018–19
- Sir Tom Finney Award: 2022
- Leyton Orient Hall of Fame
