= Jacob Walcott =

English footballer

Personal information
- Date of birth: 29 June 1992 (age 34)
- Place of birth: Abingdon, England
- Height: 5 ft 10 in (1.78 m)
- Position: Forward

Youth career
- 2006–2010: Reading

Senior career*
Years	Team	Apps	(Gls)
2010–2012	Reading	0	(0)
2010	→ Staines Town (loan)	5	(0)
2011	→ Telstar (loan)	14	(2)
2012	North Leigh		
2012	Oxford City	7	(0)
2012–2014	North Leigh		
2014–2015	Banbury United	43	(7)

International career
2008	England U16	3	(0)
2008–2009	England U17	15	(4)
- * Club domestic league appearances and goals

Jacob Walcott (born 29 June 1992) is an English former professional footballer who played as a forward.

== Club career ==
Born in Abingdon, Oxfordshire, Walcott began his career in the Academy at Reading, joining as a 13-year-old in 2006. He signed scholarship forms in 2008 before turning professional in 2010. In September 2010 he joined Staines Town on loan, extending the deal for a further month in October. During his time with the club he made five league appearances in the league and played once in the FA Cup. He soon moved out on loan again, joining Dutch side Telstar in January 2011. He remained at the club until the end of the 2010–11 season scoring two goals in fourteen appearances in the Eerste Divisie. In January 2012 he returned to the Netherlands to train with FC Utrecht but was not offered a contract. Four months later he moved to Stevenage on a similar arrangement and played for their reserves in a 6–1 defeat to Southend United reserves, though he again did not secure a permanent deal. In May 2012 he was released by Reading without making a senior appearance for the club.

He joined Southern League team North Leigh in summer 2012, though he remained there for just a few months before joining Conference North neighbours Oxford City in September 2012. His stay with Oxford was equally brief and in December, after only seven appearances, he moved back to North Leigh.

In August 2014 he signed for Banbury United, making 43 league appearances in the 2014–15 season.

== International career ==
Walcott represented England at under-16 and under-17 level. He made his debut for the under-16s against the Netherlands in February 2008, making three appearances in total. Later in the same year he played his first game for the under-17s against Finland and went on to win a further 14 caps, scoring four times.

== Personal life ==
He is a cousin of fellow player Theo Walcott.
