= Naby (name) =

Naby is a Guinean given name, as well as an Assyrian surname. Notable people with the name include:

- Eden Naby (born 1942) Iranian-Assyrian historian
- Naby Camara (born 1996), Guinean professional footballer
- Naby Damba (born 1993) Bissau-Guinean professional footballer
- Naby Diarso (born 1977) Guinean professional footballer
- Naby Keïta (born 1995) Guinean professional footballer
- Naby Sarr (born 1993), French professional footballer
- Naby Soumah (born 1985) Guinean professional footballer
- Naby Twimumu (born 1990) Luxembourgian footballer
- Naby Yattara (born 1984) Guinean professional footballer

== See also ==
- Nab (disambiguation)
- Nabe (disambiguation)
- Nabby (disambiguation)
