= 2011 UEFA European Under-21 Championship qualification Group 3 =

Football tournament qualification stage

The teams competing in Group 3 of the 2011 UEFA European Under-21 Championships qualifying competition were Italy, Wales, Hungary, Bosnia and Herzegovina and Luxembourg.

== Standings ==
Team	Pld	W	D	L	GF	GA	GD	Pts	(Italy)	(Wales)	(Hungary)	(Bosnia and Herzegovina)	(Luxembourg)
Italy	8	5	1	2	12	5	+7	16	—	1–0	2–0	1–1	2–0
Wales	8	5	1	2	15	6	+9	16	2–1	—	4–1	2–0	5–1
Hungary	8	4	1	3	9	7	+2	13	2–0	0–1	—	0–0	3–0
Bosnia and Herzegovina	8	2	2	4	4	8	−4	8	0–1	2–1	0–2	—	0–1
Luxembourg	8	1	1	6	2	16	−14	4	0–4	0–0	0–1	0–1	—

== Matches ==
27 March 2009
19:30 CEST

Luxembourg	0–0	Wales
	Report

Stade Am Deich, Ettelbruck
Referee: Ante Vučemilović-Šimunović, Jr. (Croatia)

31 March 2009
20:30 CEST

Wales	5–1	Luxembourg
Eardley 10' (pen.); Brown 11'; King 23'; Church 41'; Wilson 79'	Report	Polidori 57'

Parc y Scarlets, Llanelli
Referee: Marco Borg (Malta)

6 June 2009
20:15 CEST

Hungary	3–0	Luxembourg
Présinger 14'; Koman 36'; Korcsmár 23'	Report

ETO Park, Győr
Referee: Artyom Kuchin (Kazakhstan)

10 June 2009
19:30 CEST

Luxembourg	0–1	Hungary
	Report	Filkor 22'

Stade Jos Nosbaum, Dudelange
Referee: Igor Satchi (Moldova)

12 August 2009
19:30 CEST

Wales	4–1	Hungary
MacDonald 16'; Evans 36', 42'; King 90'	Report	Korcsmár 19'

The Racecourse Ground, Wrexham
Referee: Christos Elia (Cyprus)

4 September 2009
17:00 CEST

Bosnia and Herzegovina	0–1	Luxembourg
	Report	Twimumu 76'

Koševo, Sarajevo
Referee: Angel Angelov (Bulgaria)
4 September 2009
20:45 CEST

Wales	2–1	Italy
Ribeiro 9'; Ramsey 68'	Report	Paloschi 23'

Liberty Stadium, Swansea
Referee: Maksim Layushkin (Russia)

8 September 2009
21:00 CEST

Italy	2–0	Luxembourg
Poli 45+1'; Balotelli 90+3'	Report

Stadio Silvio Piola, Novara
Referee: Albano Janku (Albania)

10 October 2009
13:45 CEST

Wales	2–0	Bosnia and Herzegovina
Evans 56', 90+2'	Report

The Racecourse Ground, Wrexham
Referee: Radek Matějek (Czech Republic)

13 October 2009
21:00 CEST

Italy	1–1	Bosnia and Herzegovina
Marilungo 9'	Report	Čorić 31'

Stadio Danilo Martelli, Mantua
Referee: Duarte Nuno Pereira Gomes (Portugal)

13 November 2009
16:00 CEST

Hungary	2–0	Italy
Németh 15'; Koman 88'	Report

ETO Park, Győr
Referee: Mark Clattenburg (England)

17 November 2009
18:00 CEST

Luxembourg	0–4	Italy
	Report	Barillà 38', 77'; Soriano 68'; Marilungo 83'

Stade Josy Barthel, Luxembourg City
Referee: Thomas Vejlgaard (Denmark)
18 November 2009
16:00 CEST

Bosnia and Herzegovina	2–1	Wales
Haurdić 29', 66'	Report	Allen 5'

Grbavica, Sarajevo
Referee: Petteri Kari (Finland)

2 March 2010
19:00 CEST

Luxembourg	0–1	Bosnia and Herzegovina
	Report	Čorić 73' (pen.)

Stade Alphonse Theis, Hesperange
Referee: Vadims Direktorenko (Latvia)
3 March 2010
18:00 CEST

Italy	2–0	Hungary
Okaka 25'; Marrone 81'	Report

Centro d'Italia, Rieti
Referee: Clément Turpin (France)

11 August 2010
17:00 CEST

Bosnia and Herzegovina	0–2	Hungary
	Report	Németh 79'; Gosztonyi 82'

Bilino Polje, Zenica
Referee: Peter Sippel (Germany)

3 September 2010
TBD CEST

Bosnia and Herzegovina	0–1	Italy
	Report	Soriano 76'

Grbavica, Sarajevo
Referee: Alan Black (Northern Ireland)
4 September 2010
17:30 CEST

Hungary	0–1	Wales
	Report	Robson-Kanu 68'

Stadion Sóstói, Székesfehérvár
Referee: Carlos Xistra (Portugal)

7 September 2010
17:00 CEST

Italy	1–0	Wales
Mustacchio 14'	Report

Stadio Adriatico, Pescara
Referee: Bas Nijhuis (Netherlands)
7 September 2010
17:00 CEST

Hungary	0–0	Bosnia and Herzegovina
	Report

Stadion Albert, Budapest
Referee: Arman Amirkhanyan (Armenia)

== Goalscorers ==
As of 4 September, there have been 41 goals scored over 18 games, for an average of 2.28 goals per game.

Goals	Player	Country
4	Ched Evans	Wales
2	Josip Čorić	Bosnia and Herzegovina
2	Anes Haurdić	Bosnia and Herzegovina
2	Krisztián Németh	Hungary
2	Vladimir Koman	Hungary
2	Zsolt Korcsmár	Hungary
2	Antonino Barillà	Italy
2	Guido Marilungo	Italy
2	Roberto Soriano	Italy
2	Andy King	Wales

1 goal

Hungary
- András Gosztonyi
- Attila Filkor
- Ádám Présinger

Italy
- Mario Balotelli
- Luca Marrone
- Mattia Mustacchio
- Stefano Okaka
- Alberto Paloschi
- Andrea Poli

Luxembourg
- Ben Polidori
- Naby Twimumu

Wales
- Joe Allen
- Jonathan Brown
- Simon Church
- Neal Eardley
- Shaun MacDonald
- Aaron Ramsey
- Hal Robson-Kanu
- Christian Ribeiro
- James Wilson
