= Nicholas Bignall =

English footballer (born 1990)

Personal information
- Full name: Nicholas Colin Bignall
- Date of birth: 11 July 1990 (age 36)
- Place of birth: Reading, England
- Height: 5 ft 10 in (1.78 m)
- Positions: Forward; left winger

Youth career
- –2008: Reading

Senior career*
Years	Team	Apps	(Gls)
2008–2014	Reading	1	(0)
2008	→ Northampton Town (loan)	5	(1)
2009	→ Cheltenham Town (loan)	13	(3)
2009	→ Stockport County (loan)	11	(3)
2010	→ Southampton (loan)	3	(0)
2010–2011	→ Bournemouth (loan)	5	(1)
2011	→ Brentford (loan)	6	(1)
2011	→ Exeter City (loan)	3	(0)
2011	→ Wycombe Wanderers (loan)	1	(0)
2014	Basingstoke Town	11	(3)
2014–2015	Sutton United	7	(1)
2015	Hayes & Yeading United	4	(0)
2015	Basingstoke Town	5	(1)
2015	Lincoln City	0	(0)
2015–2016	Gainsborough Trinity	12	(5)
2016–2018	Hungerford Town	50	(12)
2017	→ Biggleswade Town (loan)		(1)
2017	→ Gosport Borough (loan)	2	(0)
2019–2020	Bracknell Town	7	(1)
2020	Uxbridge	3	(1)
- * Club domestic league appearances and goals

Nicholas Colin Bignall (born 11 July 1990) is an English semi-professional footballer who plays as a forward. A product of the Reading academy, he played on loan for a number of Football League clubs before recurring injuries forced him to drop into non-League football.

== Playing career ==
=== Reading ===
A forward or left winger, Bignall began his career in the academy at Reading and scored 20 goals for the U18 during the course of his two-year scholarship. Bignall signed a two-year professional contract ahead of the 2008–09 season, but spent much of the next three years away on loan from the Madejski Stadium. He made 53 appearances and scored five goals for League One clubs Northampton Town, Cheltenham Town, Stockport County, Southampton, Bournemouth, Brentford, Exeter City and Wycombe Wanderers.

After signing a new two-year contract in April 2009, Bignall made his debut for the Royals with a start in a League Cup first round match versus Burton Albion on 11 August 2009. He scored two goals in the 5–1 victory. He also started in the following round versus Barnsley, before leaving the club on loan and returning early through injury on 21 December 2009. He returned to fitness in January 2010 and made one further appearance during the 2009–10 season, as a substitute for Simon Church after 74 minutes of a 1–0 victory over Barnsley on 30 January.

Bignall made what would be his final Reading appearance early in the 2010–11 season, with a start in a 1–0 League Cup first round extra time victory over Torquay United on 11 August 2010. He signed a new two-year contract in October 2010, but subsequently spent much of the remainder of the 2010–11 season away on loan. Bignall failed to receive a call into the first team squad during the early months of the 2011–12 season and suffered a season-ending injury while away on loan in October 2011. Bignall's contract expired in June 2012, but remained with the club on a non-contract basis in a bid to return to fitness. He finally departed in 2014.

=== Non-League football ===
In March 2014, Bignall dropped into non-League football to join Conference South club Basingstoke Town and he was a part of the squad which won the 2013–14 Hampshire Senior Cup. He departed the club early in the 2014–15 season and had short spells with National League South clubs Sutton United and Hayes & Yeading United, before returning to The Camrose late in the campaign. He departed for the final time during the 2015 off-season and had short spells with Lincoln City and Gainsborough Trinity, before joining National League South club Hungerford Town in 2016. He remained at Bulpit Lane until his departure at the end of the 2017–18 season. After a year out of football, Bignall played for Isthmian League South Central Division clubs Bracknell Town and Uxbridge during the 2019–20 season.

== Coaching career ==
In September 2018, it was reported that Bignall had returned to Reading to coach in the club's academy, as part of a coaching degree course at Oxford Brookes University.

== Personal life ==
Bignall is colour blind.

== Career statistics ==
As of match played 8 December 2020

Appearances and goals by club, season and competition
Club	Season	League			FA Cup		League Cup		Other		Total	
Club	Season	Division	Apps	Goals	Apps	Goals	Apps	Goals	Apps	Goals	Apps	Goals
Reading	2009–10	Championship	1	0	—		2	2	—		3	2
Reading	2010–11	Championship	0	0	0	0	1	0	0	0	1	0
Reading	Total		1	0	0	0	3	2	0	0	4	2
Northampton Town (loan)	2008–09	League One	5	1	2	0	—		—		7	1
Cheltenham Town (loan)	2008–09	League One	13	1	—		—		—		13	1
Stockport County (loan)	2009–10	League One	11	2	1	0	—		1 (Note: Appearance in the Football League Trophy)	1	13	3
Southampton (loan)	2010–11	League One	3	0	0	0	—		—		3	0
Bournemouth (loan)	2010–11	League One	5	0	0	0	—		—		5	0
Brentford (loan)	2010–11	League One	6	0	—		—		1	0	7	0
Exeter City (loan)	2011–12	League One	3	0	—		1	0	0	0	4	0
Wycombe Wanderers (loan)	2011–12	League One	1	0	0	0	—		—		1	0
Basingstoke Town	2013–14	Conference South	9	3	—		—		1 (Note: Appearance in Hampshire Senior Cup)	0	10	3
Basingstoke Town	2014–15	Conference South	2	0	—		—		—		2	0
Basingstoke Town	Total		11	3	—		—		1	0	12	3
Sutton United	2014–15	Conference South	7	1	2	0	—		—		9	1
Hayes & Yeading United	2014–15	Conference South	4	0	—		—		1 (Note: Appearance in Middlesex Senior Cup)	0	5	0
Basingstoke Town	2014–15	Conference South	5	1	—		—		1 (Note: Appearance in Conference South play-offs)	0	6	1
Basingstoke Town	Total		16	4	—		—		2	0	18	4
Lincoln City	2015–16	National League	0	0	—		—		1 (Note: Appearance in Lincolnshire Senior Cup)	0	1	0
Gainsborough Trinity	2015–16	National League North	12	5	1	0	—		0	0	13	5
Hungerford Town	2016–17	National League South	17	3	2	0	—		2 (Note: Appearances in Berks & Bucks Senior Cup)	1	21	4
Hungerford Town	2017–18	National League South	33	9	3	1	—		1 (Note: Appearance in FA Trophy)	0	37	10
Hungerford Town	Total		50	12	5	1	—		3	1	58	14
Gosport Borough (loan)	2016–17	National League South	2	0	—		—		—		2	0
Bracknell Town	2019–20	Isthmian League South Central Division	7	1	2	0	—		0	0	9	1
Uxbridge	2019–20	Isthmian League South Central Division	3	1	—		—		—		3	1
Uxbridge	2020–21	Isthmian League South Central Division	5	0	1	0	—		3	0	9	0
Uxbridge	Total		8	1	1	0	—		3	0	12	0
Career total			154	28	12	1	4	2	12	2	182	33

== Honours ==
Basingstoke Town

- Hampshire Senior Cup: 2013–14
