= 2010–11 Southampton F.C. season =

Southampton F.C.
2010–11 season
- Chairman: Nicola Cortese
- Manager: Alan Pardew (until 30 August); Dean Wilkins (caretaker, until 12 September); Nigel Adkins (from 12 September)
- Stadium: St Mary's Stadium
- League One: 2nd (promoted)
- FA Cup: Fourth Round
- League Cup: Second Round
- League Trophy: First Round
- Top goalscorer: League: Rickie Lambert (21); All: Rickie Lambert (21)
- Highest home attendance: 31,653 vs Walsall (7 May 2011)
- Lowest home attendance: League: 17,857 vs Colchester United (18 September 2010); Overall: 8,333 vs Swindon Town (31 August 2010)
- Average home league attendance: League: 21,726; Overall: 20,513
Home colours	Away colours

The 2010–11 Southampton F.C. season was the club's 71st and sixth consecutive season in The Football League, and their second in League One. Having narrowly missed out on the chance of promotion the previous season, Southampton were again seeking to reclaim their place in The Championship by being promoted in 2011. Before the commencement of the campaign, Southampton were slated as the favourites to win the League One title by a number of bookmakers, commentators and fans.

This season marked the 125th anniversary of the club's formation in November 1885, which was celebrated in a number of ways. Firstly, the four-year sponsorship deal with Flybe ended, with shirts for the anniversary campaign designed without a sponsor; secondly, the new shirts feature a redesigned club crest recognising the 125 years of the club's life; and thirdly, a new home shirt was designed to be reminiscent of the first ever worn by players of the club, being white with a red sash. The club also released a new black away kit, also without a sponsor, designed to be similar to the popular away kit worn in the 2006–07 season.

On 11 August 2010, the season was marked by early tragedy after the death of club owner Markus Liebherr, who had brought Southampton out of administration in July 2009. As a result, the following weekend's match against Milton Keynes Dons was postponed, and there were discussions of plans for a major club tribute to Liebherr. The club also faced major change later in the month, as manager Alan Pardew was sacked shortly after a 4–0 win against Bristol Rovers, a decision which the club deemed "essential" to "achieve its well known targets". On 12 September, after much speculation, the appointment of replacement manager Nigel Adkins was confirmed.

Southampton's promotion hopes were confirmed on the last game of the season on 7 May 2011 against Walsall at home. Having beaten Plymouth Argyle 3–1 earlier in the week, the Saints had all but achieved promotion on level points with Huddersfield Town and with an 18-goal advantage in the table. Southampton beat Walsall by the same scoreline, and Huddersfield failed to win their game against Brentford, drawing 4–4; Southampton were thus promoted to the Championship for the 2011–12 season.

== Pre-season friendlies ==
In the team's opening pre-season game, during a two-match friendly tour of Switzerland, Southampton lost 4–2 to home side FC Thun. The Saints were 3–0 down at half-time, with goals coming from Ezequiel Scarione, Muhamed Demiri and Nick Proschwitz, and went another goal down after the break when Milaim Rama beat substitute goalkeeper Tommy Forecast. Southampton finally scored their first goal of the pre-season period halfway through the second half, when Dean Hammond converted a cross from David Connolly, and four minutes later captain José Fonte scored a second consolation goal from a Jason Puncheon corner. The club's tour of Switzerland heralded another unsuccessful game four days later, when French side FC Sochaux-Montbéliard beat Southampton 2–0; both goals came in the second half, from Ryad Boudebouz and Nicolas Maurice-Belay in the 50th and 60th minutes, respectively.

Back in England the club had a relative improvement in fortunes, beating Conference South side Farnborough 1–0 at Cherrywood Road on 21 July thanks to a late goal from striker Lee Barnard. Three days later the club visited Sutton United to compete in a pre-season exhibition tournament for the home side's President's Trophy, fielding a full-strength lineup (with exceptions for injuries) and drawing 1–1 following a poor start and a second half Rickie Lambert strike to share the trophy. Southampton were later criticised, however, after allegedly refusing to remain on the pitch to share the trophy, which was founded in the memory of the club's former president Andrew Letts. The club played League Two side Barnet on 27 July, with a starting lineup consisting of a mix of regular first team players, youth regulars and trialists. After a goalless first half, full back Joseph Mills broke the deadlock for the visitors shortly after the break, and 1–0 was how it remained until full-time to give Southampton another pre-season win.

In the only pre-season game at St Mary's Stadium, Southampton lost 4–2 to Championship side Reading. The visitors went one goal up within 19 minutes thanks to a "one man mission" by Icelandic midfielder Gylfi Sigurðsson, before Lee Barnard levelled for The Saints ten minutes before half-time. The score remained 1–1 at the halfway point, and Southampton restarted strongly with a goal from captain Dean Hammond in the 49th minute. With just over 20 minutes until the end, full back Dan Harding gave away a penalty to Reading, which was converted by striker Simon Church. The game was over for the hosts under ten minutes later, as Church doubled his tally and former Saints loan player Michail Antonio sealed the win for Reading in the 85th minute. In the last pre-season game of the year, just five days before the beginning of the league campaign, The Saints played a young side made up mainly of academy players against local non-league side Eastleigh, with defender Aaron Martin captaining the team against his former club. Southampton broke the initial deadlock, with young striker Sam Hoskins scoring from a low shot in the 20th minute. Many more chances were seen in the remainder of the first half and the second period, but ultimately none were made to count and Southampton finished as 1–0 winners to go into the new league season on a high note.

13 July 2010 Tour of Switzerland	Thun	4–2	Southampton	Stadion Lachen, Thun
17:00 BST	Scarione 13'; Demiri 43'; Proschwitz 45'; Rama 56'	Report	Hammond 78'; Fonte 82'	Attendance: 500

17 July 2010 Tour of Switzerland	Sochaux-Montbéliard	2–0	Southampton	Stade Universitaire Saint-Léonard, Fribourg
17:00 BST	Boudebouz 50'; Maurice-Belay 60'	Report

21 July 2010 Friendly	Farnborough	0–1	Southampton	Cherrywood Road, Farnborough
19:45 BST		Report	Barnard 91'	Attendance: 697

24 July 2010 Friendly	Sutton United	1–1	Southampton	Gander Green Lane, Sutton
15:00 BST	Dundas 21'	Report	Lambert 48'	Attendance: 876; Referee: Craig Hicks

27 July 2010 Friendly	Barnet	0–1	Southampton	Underhill Stadium, Barnet
19:45 BST		Report	Mills 51'	Attendance: 851

31 July 2010 Friendly	Southampton	2–4	Reading	St Mary's Stadium, Southampton
15:00 BST	Barnard 33'; Hammond 48'	Report	Sigurðsson 19'; Church 70' (pen.), 73'; Antonio 86'	Attendance: 8,034; Referee: Keith Stroud

2 August 2010 Friendly	Eastleigh	0–1	Southampton	Silverlake Stadium, Eastleigh
19:45 BST		Report	Hoskins 20'	Attendance: 1,655; Referee: Dean Treleaven

=== Saints XI ===
While the first team were located at their Swiss training camp, a team dubbed as the "Saints XI" comprising reserve and youth players contested a number of friendlies back in Hampshire. In their first game, a side including four trial players beat Winchester City 4–1 at the Denplan City Ground, with trialists Harlee Dean and Scott Shutton scoring in the process. In the second game, Southampton lost 2–1 to Havant & Waterlooville, after a home goal within two minutes and a 2–0 deficit at half-time meant Jordace Holder-Spooner's second goal in as many games was little more than a consolation for the Saints. On 17 July the young side played Basingstoke Town at The Camrose, losing 2–1 after a Basingstoke opener in the second half, an equalising header by in-form striker Sam Hoskins and a Stuart Lake winner for the home team.

10 July 2010 Friendly	Winchester City	1–4	Southampton	The Denplan City Ground, Winchester
17:00 BST	Gripp 88'	Report	Holder-Spooner 29'; Dean 41'; Shutton 62' (pen.); Isgrove 80'

13 July 2010 Friendly	Havant & Waterlooville	2–1	Southampton	West Leigh Park, Havant
19:45 BST	Fogden 2'; Igoe 27'	Report	Holder-Spooner 74'

17 July 2010 Friendly	Basingstoke Town	2–1	Southampton	The Camrose, Basingstoke
15:00 BST	Pratt 50'; Lake 75'	Report	Hoskins 62'	Attendance: 528

== League One ==
The fixtures for the 2010–11 League One season were published on 17 June 2010, giving Southampton an opening day home tie against Championship relegation victims Plymouth Argyle on 7 August 2010. The Saints' final game of the season will be against Walsall (whom they beat 3–1 and 5–1 in the previous season) at home on 7 May 2011; their first away game was scheduled to be against Milton Keynes Dons on 14 August but was postponed following the death of Markus Liebherr; and the local derby with AFC Bournemouth was scheduled for 2 October 2010 and 12 March 2011.

=== August–September 2010 ===
The season got off to a disappointing start for Southampton, who lost 1–0 to Plymouth Argyle in the opening game of the season on 7 August 2010. Despite dominating the first half, it was the visiting side who broke the deadlock when Luke Summerfield scored within two minutes of the beginning of the second half. Substitute Adam Lallana was the first to test Argyle goalkeeper David Button in the last quarter of the game, but the home side failed to regain their early momentum to slip to a defeat in their first game of the campaign despite a number of late chances. The club were due to play Milton Keynes Dons at Stadium:mk on 14 August, but due to the death of Markus Liebherr the match was rescheduled for 15 September. On 21 August Southampton picked up their first league point of the season against Leyton Orient, drawing 1–1 at St Mary's. On his return to the team following injury, Rickie Lambert scored a free kick early in the game to put the Saints ahead, only for Terrell Forbes to equalise two minutes later with a headed goal. Momentum changed hands throughout the remainder of the game, and a number of chances were created but missed by Southampton players, not least Lee Barnard, but the game ended level to leave the Saints in the bottom quarter of the table. The following week the club recorded their first win of the season, with an emphatic 4–0 away victory over Bristol Rovers. The game saw defender José Fonte score his debut for the club, as well as goals from Adam Lallana and a penalty from Rickie Lambert, ending in the final minute with Lee Barnard's first goal of the season. Despite this impressive win, it was the last game for manager Alan Pardew, who was sacked just days later.

Assistant manager Dean Wilkins took over as caretaker manager following Pardew's sacking, and his first league game in charge was at home against recently promoted Rochdale on 4 September. The first period was largely dictated by the Saints, but a goal from Chris O'Grady on the stroke of half time broke up the home side's momentum and they went into the second half trailing. The game continued in the visitors' favour and Rochdale doubled their lead just after the hour mark courtesy of a volley from Gary Jones, leaving the Saints in a precarious position leading up to the imminent appointment of a new manager. Saints, still without a replacement manager, played Swindon Town on 11 September after losing 3–0 to the club in the League Trophy less than two weeks before. The game was yet another disappointment for Dean Wilkins's side, who lost 1–0 courtesy of a 65th-minute goal from Charlie Austin, despite hitting the frame of the goal twice and having an effort cleared off the line during the game.

Following the appointment of Nigel Adkins as the club's new first team manager, the Saints played Milton Keynes Dons at Stadium:mk on 15 September, the game having been postponed following the death of Markuss Liebherr. Adkins began his time on the South Coast poorly, leading Southampton to their fourth consecutive goalless defeat at the hands of the Dons. The first half ended goalless, with goalkeepers David Martin and Kelvin Davis impressing with saves from Rickie Lambert and Lewis Guy respectively, but two goals in the last 20 minutes from Angelo Balanta and Peter Leven left the visitors in the relegation zone with their game in hand played. The club's disappointing run of results continued on 18 September with a goalless draw against Colchester United, leaving them in the relegation zone. The game itself was arguably evenly spread between Southampton and Colchester, with the home side said to be edging ahead in the second half culminating in three consecutive chances for Rickie Lambert in injury time at the end of the game. On 25 September Southampton earned their first win in six games by beating Sheffield Wednesday at Hillsborough Stadium. Lee Barnard scored his second league goal of the season (and the first under manager Nigel Adkins) to end the club's 510-minute goal drought to help them out of the relegation zone. The game was largely dominant for the Saints, although for short periods of time throughout the game Wednesday looked to be on top of proceedings. Other chances came from Alex Oxlade-Chamberlain and Rickie Lambert, and at the very end of the game goalkeeper Kelvin Davis pulled off a string of impressive saves to hold on to the 1–0 for Southampton. In the final game of the month on 28 September, Southampton were unable to build on the previous weekend's win, drawing 1–1 at Yeovil Town. Brazilian loan signing Guilherme do Prado, who came on as a substitute for the second half, scored his first goal of the season for the Saints just before the hour mark, only to be cancelled out by an Adam Virgo penalty less than ten minutes later. Guly almost won the game for the visiting side late on in the match, but was denied a second goal by Yeovil's post, leaving both sides to pick up a point from the match.

=== October–December 2010 ===
On 2 October the Saints picked up their second win in three matches by beating local rivals AFC Bournemouth 2–0 at St Mary's Stadium. The home side took command throughout the game, with Rickie Lambert scoring two penalties, one in each half, to overpower the in-form visitors. The first league meeting between the local rivals in over 50 years, the match was eventful throughout with a total of five bookings and one dismissal, numerous potential penalties and other controversies, and also saw the return of Adam Lallana and debut of loanee Richard Chaplow. The following week Southampton continued their winning streak with a 2–0 domination of visitors Tranmere Rovers. Rickie Lambert picked up his third goal in two games just before the end of the first period, followed by a goal from Adam Lallana on the outside of the box to send the club two places up to 13th in League One. Southampton faced defeat again on 16 October when they lost 2–0 to fellow promotion hopefuls Huddersfield Town at the Galpharm Stadium. The home side broke the deadlock within the first six minutes of the game thanks to a goal from winger Anthony Pilkington, and continued to dominate the first half until Joey Guðjónsson doubled the lead in the final minute before half-time. The second half continued largely in Huddersfield's favour, with sporadic moments of Southampton domination leading to little in terms of scoring chances. Late in the second period the game's fourth official, unable to continue, had to be replaced, which took some time to complete; the result was an astonishing 11 minutes of injury time (which also included time added on for a head injury to Rickie Lambert) added on at the end of the game, although even this was insufficient for the Saints to come back and they ultimately lost quite comprehensively. The Saints made it three consecutive home wins on 23 October when they came behind from a one-goal deficit to beat Oldham Athletic 2–1. Defender José Fonte scored his second of the season on the stroke of half time, before young winger Alex Oxlade-Chamberlain scored his first league goal for the club in the second half to secure the win.

The following week the Saints travelled to League One newcomers Notts County, with a team that included the return of defender Frazer Richardson after a long injury and captain Dean Hammond following suspension. The home side opened the scoring within ten minutes, with Mike Edwards heading in a Ben Davies free kick to give new manager Paul Ince a dream start to his managerial spell with the club. County held onto their lead until just before the 70-minute mark, when captain John Tompson was shown a straight red card for bringing down Lee Barnard in the box, subsequently resulting in a penalty for the visiting side. Rickie Lambert converted the spot kick to equalise for Southampton, before setting up Barnard himself for a goal just a few minutes later to take the lead. Winger Adam Lallana scored in injury time to seal the win against the ten-man Notts County, sending the South Coast club up to 9th place in the league, their highest since the beginning of the campaign. On 2 November the Saints faced 23rd-placed Dagenham & Redbridge at home, another recently promoted side, and picked up an extremely comfortable 4–0 win. Alex Oxlade-Chamberlain picked up two more goals to add to his impressive recent tally and put the home side 2–0 up going into half time, before Lee Barnard and José Fonte scored in the 56th and 69th minutes respectively to convert the dominant performance into another win for Southampton. As a result, the club moved into 6th place, the first time they had been in a playoff position all season. On 13 November the club's winning streak ended at the hands of Carlisle United who picked up a 3–2 win over the Saints. The first half saw Southampton display one of their worst performances of the season, with a Dan Harding own goal putting Carlisle into half-time two goals up. Another goal from teenage winger Alex Oxlade-Chamberlain gave the Saints a lifeline, although Carlisle picked up one more to make Dean Hammond's 81st-minute long range strike a mere consolation.

Southampton got back on track with their sixth consecutive home game win in all competitions against Peterborough United on 20 November with a convincing 4–1 win. Goals came from Lee Barnard, José Fonte, Richard Chaplow and Guly do Prado, which sent the club back into the playoff positions in preparation for the match against first-place Brighton & Hove Albion later in the week. The game against Brighton, contested on 23 November, ended goalless after Southampton owned the first half and also arguably out-performed the visitors in the second period. Kelvin Davis notably saved a penalty, while Southampton had a large number of chances thwarted by the defensive Brighton side who ultimately held on to end Southampton's winning run at home. After a long break due to adverse weather conditions, Southampton hosted Brentford on 11 December and lost 2–0, with first half goals coming from strikers Gary Alexander and Charlie MacDonald. After more postponed matches, the Saints returned to St Mary's on 28 December to defeat Huddersfield Town 4–1 in the first return game of the season. Despite going 1–0 down in the first half, the Saints dominated the majority of the game and goals from Rickie Lambert, Alex Oxlade-Chamberlain, Radhi Jaïdi and Richard Chaplow helped the home side move swiftly to the playoff positions in 5th place.

=== January–February 2011 ===
Southampton began 2011 in top form, beating Exeter City 4–0 on 1 January. Winger Guly do Prado scored twice, before Adam Lallana and substitute Lee Barnard topped off the match with goals in the second half. Thanks to results elsewhere in the league, the result sent the club to the automatic promotion places for the first time in the season. Just two days later, the Saints travelled to play the return match against Dagenham & Redbridge, after beating the side 4–0 in November. After a goalless first half and numerous Saints chances, the visiting club broke the deadlock less than two minutes after the break, when Adam Lallana scored his eighth of the season with an overhead kick. Guly do Prado made it 2–0 after 75 minutes, before Josh Scott headered in a goal for the home side in the last ten minutes. Dagenham were unable to make the goal count for anything, however, as striker Rickie Lambert finished the game off with a goal in the last minute to keep Saints in the automatic promotion places. On 11 January Southampton closed the gap on League leaders Brighton by thrashing Oldham Athletic 6–0 at Boundary Park. The scoring started early, as winger Alex Oxlade-Chamberlain scored within nine minutes before Adam Lallana made it two shortly before half time. In the second half though, the Saints made their advantage really count, converting a further four chances with Guly do Prado, Richard Chaplow, Rickie Lambert and substitute Lee Barnard adding to their season tallies to increase the pressure at the top of League One. Southampton's winning run came to an end on 15 January, as the match with Notts County ended goalless. The Saints had the majority of possession throughout the game, José Fonte was denied a goal in the second half as his header was cleared off the line, and in the last minute Ryan Dickson cleared a County effort off the line to leave the match goalless. The misfortune continued when Southampton lost 2–0 to Tranmere Rovers in the return game at Prenton Park. The first half was dominated by the struggling home side, and marked by a goal for midfielder John Welsh following a miscommunication between Saints goalkeeper Kelvin Davis and defender José Fonte. The visiting team continued to struggle in the second half, and under-performances from players such as Rickie Lambert, Alex Oxlade-Chamberlain and Guly do Prado meant that Rovers doubled their lead thanks to a goal from Dale Jennings, sending the Saints down to fourth below local rivals Bournemouth following their win over league leaders Brighton.

On 1 February, Saints scraped a win at Exeter City to avoid a three-game losing streak. The game ended 2–1 to Southampton after a brace of goals from Rickie Lambert, including a final-minute winner, reversed the initial Exeter lead. Daniel Nardiello opened the scoring for the home side just before half time, and it took until 20 minutes before the end for the visitors to come back, when Lambert headed in a cross from new signing Dany N'Guessan to equalise. Lambert doubled his tally in the last minute of normal time, heading in another cross this time from returning midfielder Dean Hammond. On 5 February Southampton dropped two points in the return match against Peterborough United, sharing the spoils in an eight-goal thriller. The visitors started off the game well, going 2–0 up within half an hour following a Richard Chaplow goal and a Rickie Lambert penalty, but in the last six minutes of the first half Peterborough equalised with strikes from Craig Mackail-Smith and Chris Whelpdale. Lambert scored a second penalty just after the break to extend his lead as the club's top scorer of the season, and returning captain Dean Hammond restored the Saints' two-goal lead just three minutes later. A further two penalties for Peterborough led to a 4–4 draw, with the final goal coming from Lee Tomlin in the third minute of injury time at the end of the match. A week later the Saints reduced Huddersfield Town's lead in 3rd place of the table when they defeated Carlisle United 1–0 at home in a relatively uneventful game. The game was initially brought alive within the last five minutes of the first half, when Carlisle defender Gary Borrowdale was sent off after receiving a second booking for arguing with the assistant referee, after which Rickie Lambert scored his 50th Southampton goal by heading in Alex Oxlade-Chamberlain's cross. In the second half, further chances were limited and Southampton nervously picked up three points while Huddersfield played out a goalless draw with Oldham Athletic meaning Southampton could go ahead of Huddersfield should they win their game-in-hand. Southampton remained fifth with several games in hand over Peterborough, Huddersfield and Bournemouth after drawing 0–0 with Hartlepool United on 22 February. Southampton upheld their unbeaten league run at the weekend, beating Swindon Town 4–1 at home in a convincing performance marked by only five minutes of Swindon dominance in the second half. Adam Lallana opened the scoring for the home side after just 15 minutes, and chances for Alex Oxlade-Chamberlain and Guly do Prado could have increased the scoreline going into half-time. In the second half, winger Matt Ritchie equalised for Swindon, but his effort was cancelled out within minutes when Rickie Lambert and Radhi Jaïdi both scored from set pieces within two minutes of one another to make it 3–1. With more chances for Saints in the later stages of the game, substitute Lee Barnard eventually confirmed the win for Southampton with a goal in stoppage time.

=== March–May 2011 ===
On 1 March, Southampton lost away to Walsall, who before the match were in the relegation zone. In terms of attempts and pressure, the visitors were largely on top for most of the game, but it was Walsall who made their chance count when Jon Macken scored in a period dominated by Saints chances in the second half. Despite late chances for Lallana, Barnard, Lambert and Jaïdi, Walsall rode out the 1–0 victory to leave Saints in 5th place in the table. The Saints won their return game against Colchester United 2–0 on 5 March, increasing the pressure in the top section of the table. After largely dominating the opening period, the visitors went one up after half an hour with Alex Oxlade-Chamberlain poaching a goal following a Rickie Lambert free kick. Within two minutes of the goal, Colchester were reduced to ten players as striker David Mooney was sent off for challenging Danny Butterfield off the ball, and Southampton's dominance was made easier for the remainder of the game. In the second half the team made their advantage count, as captain and former Colchester player Dean Hammond scored his third league goal of the season from inside to double Southampton's lead and secure the three points. Back at St Mary's on 8 March, Southampton beat struggling side Yeovil Town 3–0. Lee Barnard scored twice to bring his league tally to 10, and Alex Oxlade-Chamberlain finished off the scoring in the second half with a long-range solo effort. The Saints remained fifth, however, as teams above them won their matches too.

On 13 March, Southampton travelled to Dean Court for the second local derby against Bournemouth of the season. Southampton won the game 3–1, meaning they moved above the home side in the league table. The game was an exciting encounter all-round, with Finnish teenage striker Lauri Dalla Valle, on loan from Fulham, opening the scoring for Bournemouth in the 6th minutes, despite Southampton players' protests of offside. Just five minutes later however, it was all level again when Lee Barnard's header was fumbled by the Bournemouth defence and found its way into the net for 1–1. In the second half, Southampton took the lead thanks to a goal from captain Dean Hammond, and top scorer Rickie Lambert assured the win in the 88th minute with a solo effort. In injury time, Oscar Gobern received a red card, but Southampton cruised to victory to move up to 4th place in the table once again. Southampton picked up a fourth consecutive league game win on 19 March, beating Sheffield Wednesday 2–0 in a late kick-off. Despite a number of good chances for the Saints in the opening 45 minutes, it took until 15 minutes into the second half for defender José Fonte to break the deadlock, heading in an Alex Oxlade-Chamberlain corner. With the team in full flow now, Rickie Lambert scored his 17th goal of the season just six minutes later to make it two for Southampton and secure the win. It could have been more though, with Adam Lallana hitting the post shortly after Lambert's goal and a great performance from Wednesday goalkeeper Richard O'Donnell denying further opportunities from Oxlade-Chamberlain and others.

Southampton moved up to third place in the table on 24 March when they picked up a point against Charlton Athletic at The Valley, although missed out on the chance to move second with two games still in hand over Huddersfield Town. The Saints largely edged out the home side throughout the game, with more possession and chances on goal, but it took until after the hour mark to break the deadlock when defender Radhi Jaïdi headed in a corner from Guly do Prado, who had only come on as a substitute three minutes earlier. Charlton increased the pressure in the last 20 minutes, and former Saints player Bradley Wright-Phillips equalised the game in the 86th minute to crush Southampton's hopes of moving into the League One promotion places. After a two-week break, Southampton returned to St Mary's to face Milton Keynes Dons on 2 April 2011 and won 3–2. The visiting side were on top for most of the first half, and opened the scoring in the 34th minute when Gary MacKenzie headed in a Peter Leven corner. The Dons doubled their lead early in the second half courtesy of Sam Baldock, but after Jonathan Forte came on for the Saints shortly after the hour mark the dynamic of the game changed: Forte scored two goals in the space of two minutes, bringing Southampton level and giving them a chance to make the game their own. It only took another ten minutes for the home team to score another and take the lead, this time courtesy of Lee Barnard latching onto a Rickie Lambert assist. Southampton held out for the victory, and remained third in the table with three games in hand over Huddersfield and two over Brighton. Southampton's run of good form was continued when they played Charlton Athletic at St Mary's just two weeks after the match at The Valley, winning 2–0. Goals came from Guly do Prado early in the first half and from Lee Barnard early in the second, with each scorer setting up the other for their goal.

Southampton moved into the automatic promotion places of League One on 9 April by beating Leyton Orient 2–0 at Brisbane Road. The Saints rode their luck somewhat throughout the game, as Orient playmaker Jimmy Smith was denied two goals for offside and Stephen Dawson hit the post in the last minute. Rickie Lambert scored his 18th goal of the season in the 26th minute to put the Saints one up, and the victory was sealed in the 88th minute by a goal from Lee Barnard. The victory was complemented by Huddersfield Town drawing 1–1 with Peterborough United, which meant that Southampton could move past them into second place in the table, still with two games in hand. Three days later though, Southampton lost for the first time in ten games at Rochdale in one of their games-in-hand over third-placed Huddersfield and leaders Brighton. Midfielder Joe Thompson opened the scoring just before the half-hour mark with a headed goal before striker Chris O'Grady made it two before half time. The visitors had more of the ball overall and more chances on goal, but Rochdale held onto the clean sheet and the two-goal lead to leave Southampton trailing even further behind Brighton, who picked up another win to go 16 points ahead at the top of League One. Southampton picked up an important three points on 16 April against Bristol Rovers, when they won by a single goal at St Mary's. The game was marked by the high number of bookings it heralded – four for the Saints and three for Rovers – as well as an injury to striker Lee Barnard which forced him to be carried off the pitch on a stretcher. Guly do Prado scored the only goal of the game, converting a solo effort into the winning strike in the 82nd minute to keep Southampton in second place. Brighton won their game against Walsall 3–1, which meant that they secured the League One title for the season, leaving Southampton to fight against Huddersfield, Peterborough United and Milton Keynes Dons for the second automatic promotion place.

Southampton faced Brighton on 23 April, and after trailing for most of the game managed to beat the new League One champions 2–1. The first half was evenly matched, with the Saints maybe edging the home side out slightly, but it was Brighton who broke the deadlock just before half time thanks to a goal from Ashley Barnes following an incident of miscommunication between Radhi Jaïdi and Kelvin Davis. It took until the 84th minute for the Saints to equalise, and the goal came from substitute David Connolly, who had been on the pitch for less than ten minutes. Just five minutes later, in the last minute of normal time, José Fonte headed in a cross from Dean Hammond to put the visitors ahead and secure the three points. The Saints increased the pressure on Huddersfield by beating Hartlepool United 2–0 two days later. The first half was dominated by the home side, with a goal from Guly do Prado being disallowed for offside. Rickie Lambert opened the scoring in the second half with a penalty following a foul by defender Sam Collins which saw the visitors go down to ten men. José Fonte doubled the lead in the 82nd minute to secure the win and keep Southampton in the second automatic promotion place. Southampton beat Brentford 3–0 on 30 April to put them one win away from promotion. The Saints dominated from start to finish, with goals coming from Adam Lallana in the 16th minute, David Conolly on the half-hour mark, and Oscar Gobern in the first minute of added time at the end of the match.

Southampton essentially confirmed their promotion in the penultimate game of the season against Plymouth Argyle on 2 May, when they won 3–1 after dominating the entire match. Despite their dominance, Southampton did not score until the stroke of half time, when Rickie Lambert scored his 20th goal of the season by heading in a Danny Butterfield cross. Defender Ryan Dickson made it two with his first of the season shortly after the break, before a foul gave the Saints a penalty which Lambert confidently converted to put the visitors three up within the hour and all-but confirm the relegation of struggling Plymouth. Yannick Bolasie picked up a consolation for the home side in injury time, but it was not enough to save their League One status. Southampton confirmed their promotion in the last game of the season on 7 May against Walsall, winning 3–1. The game was largely dominated by the home side, who scored twice in a three-minute period in the first half, with goals coming from Guly do Prado and David Connolly. A Walsall goal on the stroke of half time was a mere consolation, as returning winger Alex Oxlade-Chamberlain, on as a substitute, scored a solo goal in the 68th minute to make Southampton's promotion dream a reality.

=== Matches ===
7 August 2010 Match 1	Southampton	0–1	Plymouth Argyle	St Mary's Stadium, Southampton
12:15 BST		Report	Summerfield 47'	Attendance: 21,727; Referee: Jon Moss

21 August 2010 Match 2	Southampton	1–1	Leyton Orient	St Mary's Stadium, Southampton
15:00 BST	Lambert 12'	Report	Forbes 15'	Attendance: 21,468; Referee: Phil Gibbs

28 August 2010 Match 3	Bristol Rovers	0–4	Southampton	Memorial Stadium, Bristol
15:00 BST		Report	Fonte 10'; Lallana 34'; Lambert 59' (pen.); Barnard 90+1'	Attendance: 8,226; Referee: Graham Scott

4 September 2010 Match 4	Southampton	0–2	Rochdale	St Mary's Stadium, Southampton
15:00 BST		Report	O'Grady 45+1'; Jones 68'	Attendance: 18,169; Referee: Andy Woolmer

11 September 2010 Match 5	Swindon Town	1–0	Southampton	County Ground, Swindon
15:00 BST	Austin 65'	Report		Attendance: 11,087; Referee: Andy Penn

15 September 2010 Match 6	Milton Keynes Dons	2–0	Southampton	Stadium:mk, Milton Keynes
19:45 BST	Balanta 72'; Leven 87'	Report		Attendance: 8,133; Referee: Fred Graham

18 September 2010 Match 7	Southampton	0–0	Colchester United	St Mary's Stadium, Southampton
15:00 BST		Report		Attendance: 17,857; Referee: Graham Horwood

25 September 2010 Match 8	Sheffield Wednesday	0–1	Southampton	Hillsborough Stadium, Sheffield
15:00 BST		Report	Barnard 61'	Attendance: 18,198; Referee: Graham Salisbury

28 September 2010 Match 9	Yeovil Town	1–1	Southampton	Huish Park, Yeovil
19:45 BST	Virgo 65' (pen.)	Report	do Prado 56'	Attendance: 5,854; Referee: Simon Hooper

2 October 2010 Match 10	Southampton	2–0	AFC Bournemouth	St Mary's Stadium, Southampton
15:00 BST	Lambert 19' (pen.), 55' (pen.)	Report		Attendance: 26,289; Referee: Kevin Wright

9 October 2010 Match 11	Southampton	2–0	Tranmere Rovers	St Mary's Stadium, Southampton
15:00 BST	Lambert 42'; Lallana 56'	Report		Attendance: 19,293; Referee: Gavin Ward

16 October 2010 Match 12	Huddersfield Town	2–0	Southampton	Galpharm Stadium, Huddersfield
15:00 BST	Pilkington 6'; Guðjónsson 45'	Report		Attendance: 14,769; Referee: Colin Webster

23 October 2010 Match 13	Southampton	2–1	Oldham Athletic	St Mary's Stadium, Southampton
15:00 BST	Fonte 45+2'; Oxlade-Chamberlain 73'	Report	Furman 22'	Attendance: 20,968; Referee: Andy D'Urso

30 October 2010 Match 14	Notts County	1–3	Southampton	Meadow Lane, Nottingham
15:00 BST	Edwards 9'	Report	Lambert 68' (pen.); Barnard 73'; Lallana 90+4'	Attendance: 9,457; Referee: Jock Waugh

2 November 2010 Match 15	Southampton	4–0	Dagenham & Redbridge	St Mary's Stadium, Southampton
19:45 GMT	Oxlade-Chamberlain 11', 37'; Barnard 56'; Fonte 69'	Report		Attendance: 20,161; Referee: Danny McDermid

13 November 2010 Match 16	Carlisle United	3–2	Southampton	Brunton Park, Carlisle
15:00 GMT	Marshall 21'; Harding 30' (o.g.); Chester 57'	Report	Oxlade-Chamberlain 49'; Hammond 81'	Attendance: 6,578; Referee: Karl Evans

20 November 2010 Match 17	Southampton	4–1	Peterborough United	St Mary's Stadium, Southampton
15:00 GMT	Barnard 28'; Fonte 46'; Chaplow 50' do Prado 80'	Report	McLean 76'	Attendance: 22,177; Referee: Chris Sarginson

23 November 2010 Match 18	Southampton	0–0	Brighton & Hove Albion	St Mary's Stadium, Southampton
19:45 GMT		Report		Attendance: 26,237; Referee: Iain Williamson

11 December 2010 Match 19	Southampton	0–2	Brentford	St Mary's Stadium, Southampton
15:00 GMT		Report	Alexander 13'; MacDonald 28'	Attendance: 19,641; Referee: Oliver Langford

28 December 2010 Match 20	Southampton	4–1	Huddersfield Town	St Mary's Stadium, Southampton
15:00 GMT	Lambert 28'; Oxlade-Chamberlain 32'; Jaïdi 51'; Chaplow 72'	Report	Novak 15'	Attendance: 24,483; Referee: James Linington

1 January 2011 Match 21	Southampton	4–0	Exeter City	St Mary's Stadium, Southampton
15:00 GMT	do Prado 19', 51'; Lallana 66'; Barnard 90+2'	Report		Attendance: 22,465; Referee: Dave Phillips

3 January 2011 Match 22	Dagenham & Redbridge	1–3	Southampton	Victoria Road, London
15:00 GMT	Scott 84'	Report	Lallana 47' do Prado 75'; Lambert 90'	Attendance: 3,585; Referee: Mick Russell

11 January 2011 Match 23	Oldham Athletic	0–6	Southampton	Boundary Park, Oldham
19:45 GMT		Report	Oxlade-Chamberlain 9'; Lallana 38' do Prado 52'; Chaplow 69'; Lambert 74'; Barnard 86'	Attendance: 3,767; Referee: Geoff Eltringham

15 January 2011 Match 24	Southampton	0–0	Notts County	St Mary's Stadium, Southampton
15:00 GMT		Report		Attendance: 20,201; Referee: Graham Scott

22 January 2011 Match 25	Tranmere Rovers	2–0	Southampton	Prenton Park, Birkenhead
15:00 GMT	Welsh 13'; Jennings 60'	Report		Attendance: 5,504; Referee: David Webb

1 February 2011 Match 26	Exeter City	1–2	Southampton	St James Park, Exeter
19:45 GMT	Nardiello 39'	Report	Lambert 70', 90'	Attendance: 6,370; Referee: Danny McDermid

5 February 2011 Match 27	Peterborough United	4–4	Southampton	London Road Stadium, Peterborough
17:20 GMT	Mackail-Smith 39'; Whelpdale 45'; McCann 55' (pen.); Tomlin 90+3' (pen.)	Report	Chaplow 18'; Lambert 31' (pen.), 47' (pen.); Hammond 50'	Attendance: 6,905; Referee: Eddie Ilderton

12 February 2011 Match 28	Southampton	1–0	Carlisle United	St Mary's Stadium, Southampton
15:00 GMT	Lambert 43'	Report		Attendance: 25,076; Referee: Robert Lewis

22 February 2011 Match 29	Hartlepool United	0–0	Southampton	Victoria Park, Hartlepool
19:45 GMT		Report		Attendance: 3,301; Referee: Scott Mathieson

26 February 2011 Match 30	Southampton	4–1	Swindon Town	St Mary's Stadium, Southampton
15:00 GMT	Lallana 15'; Lambert 60'; Jaïdi 61'; Barnard 90+2'	Report	Ritchie 54'	Attendance: 22,627; Referee: Steve Rushton

1 March 2011 Match 31	Walsall	1–0	Southampton	Bescot Stadium, Walsall
19:45 GMT	Macken 69'	Report		Attendance: 4,684; Referee: Dean Whitestone

5 March 2011 Match 32	Colchester United	0–2	Southampton	Colchester Community Stadium, Colchester
15:00 GMT		Report	Oxlade-Chamberlain 30'; Hammond 50'	Attendance: 6,523; Referee: Phil Gibbs

8 March 2011 Match 33	Southampton	3–0	Yeovil Town	St Mary's Stadium, Southampton
19:45 GMT	Barnard 15', 55'; Oxlade-Chamberlain 67'	Report		Attendance: 18,623; Referee: Keith Hill

12 March 2011 Match 34	AFC Bournemouth	1–3	Southampton	Dean Court, Bournemouth
15:00 GMT	Dalla Valle 6'	Report	Barnard 11'; Hammond 71'; Lambert 88'	Attendance: 10,008; Referee: Andre Marriner

19 March 2011 Match 35	Southampton	2–0	Sheffield Wednesday	St Mary's Stadium, Southampton
17:20 GMT	Fonte 60'; Lambert 66'	Report		Attendance: 20,234; Referee: Darren Deadman

22 March 2011 Match 36	Charlton Athletic	1–1	Southampton	The Valley, London
19:45 GMT	Wright-Phillips 86'	Report	Jaïdi 64'	Attendance: 16,550; Referee: Andy D'Urso

2 April 2011 Match 37	Southampton	3–2	Milton Keynes Dons	St Mary's Stadium, Southampton
15:00 BST	Forte 66', 67'; Barnard 77'	Report	MacKenzie 34'; Baldock 52'	Attendance: 22,377; Referee: Mick Russell

5 April 2011 Match 38	Southampton	2–0	Charlton Athletic	St Mary's Stadium, Southampton
19:45 BST	do Prado 11'; Barnard 58'	Report		Attendance: 20,112; Referee: Anthony Bates

9 April 2011 Match 39	Leyton Orient	0–2	Southampton	Brisbane Road, London
15:00 BST		Report	Lambert 26'; Barnard 88'	Attendance: 7,714; Referee: Mark Clattenburg

12 April 2011 Match 40	Rochdale	2–0	Southampton	Spotland Stadium, Manchester
19:45 BST	Joe Thompson 28'; O'Grady 41'	Report		Attendance: 3,825; Referee: Mark Haywood

16 April 2011 Match 41	Southampton	1–0	Bristol Rovers	St Mary's Stadium, Southampton
15:00 BST	do Prado 82'	Report		Attendance: 23,647; Referee: Dean Whitestone

23 April 2011 Match 42	Brighton & Hove Albion	1–2	Southampton	Withdean Stadium, Brighton
15:00 BST	Barnes 45+1'	Report	Connolly 84'; Fonte 89'	Attendance: 8,169; Referee: Scott Mathieson

25 April 2011 Match 43	Southampton	2–0	Hartlepool United	St Mary's Stadium, Southampton
15:00 BST	Lambert 50' (pen.); Fonte 82'	Report		Attendance: 24,210; Referee: Simon Hooper

30 April 2011 Match 44	Brentford	0–3	Southampton	Griffin Park, London
15:00 BST		Report	Lallana 16'; Connolly 30'; Gobern 90+1'	Attendance: 7,015; Referee: Trevor Kettle

2 May 2011 Match 45	Plymouth Argyle	1–3	Southampton	Home Park, Plymouth
15:00 BST	Bolasie 90+3'	Report	Lambert 45', 59' (pen.); Dickson 49'	Attendance: 13,118; Referee: Andy Woolmer

7 May 2011 Match 46	Southampton	3–1	Walsall	St Mary's Stadium, Southampton
15:00 BST	do Prado 26'; Connolly 29'; Oxlade-Chamberlain 68'	Report	Gray 45+3'	Attendance: 31,653; Referee: Graham Scott

Match-by-match record

Round	1	2	3	4	5	6	7	8	9	10	11	12	13	14	15	16	17	18	19	20	21	22	23	24	25	26	27	28	29	30	31	32	33	34	35	36	37	38	39	40	41	42	43	44	45	46
Ground	H	H	A	H	A	A	H	A	A	H	H	A	H	A	H	A	H	H	H	H	H	A	A	H	A	A	A	H	A	H	A	A	H	A	H	A	H	H	A	A	H	A	H	A	A	H
Result	L	D	W	L	L	L	D	W	D	W	W	L	W	W	W	L	W	D	L	W	W	W	W	D	L	W	D	W	D	W	L	W	W	W	W	D	W	W	W	L	W	W	W	W	W	W
Position	20	20	14	18	22	22	22	18	17	15	13	15	14	9	6	10	6	7	9	5	2	2	2	3	4	4	4	4	5	5	5	5	5	4	4	3	3	3	2	2	2	2	2	2	2	2

Updated to match(es) played on 7 May 2011. Source: Southampton F.C.
A = Away; H = Home; W = Win; D = Draw; L = Loss

League table

Pos	Club	Pld	W	D	L	GF	GA	GD	Pts
1	Brighton & Hove Albion	46	28	11	7	85	40	+45	95
2	Southampton	46	28	8	10	86	38	+48	92
3	Huddersfield Town	46	25	12	9	77	48	+29	87
4	Peterborough United	46	23	10	13	106	75	+31	79
5	Milton Keynes Dons	46	23	8	15	67	60	+7	77

Pld = Matches played; W = Matches won; D = Matches drawn; L = Matches lost; GF = Goals for; GA = Goals against; GD = Goal difference; Pts = Points

== FA Cup ==
The draw for the First Round of the 2010–11 FA Cup took place on 24 October 2010, giving Southampton a home tie against League Two club Shrewsbury Town to be played on 6 November. After a largely mundane and entirely uneventful game at St Mary's, the Saints defeated the Shrews with two goals in injury time at the end of the game from David Connolly and Adam Lallana. Connolly's goal was his first of the season, and came after he was brought on as a substitute just moments previously after a long period out through injury; he also provided the assist for Lallana's goal to send Southampton into the Second Round of the FA Cup.

The draw for the Second Round took place on 7 November at 14:00 GMT, and gave Southampton a home tie against League Two side Cheltenham Town to be played on 27 November. The Saints won the game with a comprehensive 3–0 victory to advance to the Third Round, the draw for which will take place on 28 November. The game saw the first starts of the season for winger Lee Holmes, midfielder Oscar Gobern in the absence of Morgan Schneiderlin and Richard Chaplow, and goalkeeper Bartosz Białkowski, and goals came from Adam Lallana, Guly do Prado and Gobern, who also had a goal disallowed in the second half. Despite starting for the first time in the season, Lee Holmes was replaced early in the game due to injury, and was shortly followed before the beginning of the second half by Frazer Richardson and Rickie Lambert.

On 8 January 2011, Southampton played their Third Round tie against Premier League side Blackpool, winning the game 2–0 at St Mary's. Despite an impressive first half display from the Saints, which included a free kick from Rickie Lambert and chances for Adam Lallana and Lee Barnard, the deadlock was not broken until almost ten minutes into the second half, when Barnard scored his seventh goal of the season. The home side continued to play offensively, and finally sealed their win two minutes from the end of normal time, when substitute Guly do Prado scored a "splendid", "stunning" goal from open play.

The draw for the Fourth Round took place the day after the Blackpool match, pitting Southampton against Premier League high-flyers Manchester United, again at St Mary's. The match took place on 29 January 2011, and saw Southampton slip to a 2–1 defeat at the hands of the Premier League leaders. The home side were arguably the dominant force in the first half, with a Dan Harding goal disallowed for offside and a Guly do Prado chance wasted, and their strength was confirmed just before the break when Richard Chaplow scored an impressive goal from inside the penalty area. The second half was a disappointment for the hosts however, as United improved their form and fought back with goals from Michael Owen and Javier Hernández to squeeze the Premier League contenders through to the Fifth Round of the FA Cup and send Saints out of the competition.

6 November 2010 First Round	Southampton	2–0	Shrewsbury Town	St Mary's Stadium, Southampton
15:00 GMT	Connolly 90+2'; Lallana 90+2'	Report		Attendance: 10,410; Referee: Grant Hegley

27 November 2010 Second Round	Southampton	3–0	Cheltenham Town	St Mary's Stadium, Southampton
15:00 GMT	Lallana 8' do Prado 50'; Gobern 87'	Report		Attendance: 9,276; Referee: Stuart Attwell

8 January 2011 Third Round	Southampton	2–0	Blackpool	St Mary's Stadium, Southampton
15:00 GMT	Barnard 53' do Prado 88'	Report		Attendance: 21,464; Referee: Danny McDermid

29 January 2011 Fourth Round	Southampton	1–2	Manchester United	St Mary's Stadium, Southampton
17:15 GMT	Chaplow 45'	Report	Owen 65'; Hernández 75'	Attendance: 28,792; Referee: Martin Atkinson

== League Cup ==
On 16 June 2010 the draw for the First Round of the 2010–11 Football League Cup gave Southampton a home tie against local rivals and League One newcomers AFC Bournemouth. After a challenging first half, the Saints improved in the second period and finally broke the deadlock shortly after the hour mark thanks to a spectacular goal from Adam Lallana. Previous season's star striker Rickie Lambert made his first appearance of the season late in the game, before teenager Alex Oxlade-Chamberlain scored his first goal for the club on his full debut to put Southampton into the Second Round of the League Cup.

The day after the match against Bournemouth, the draw for the Second Round saw Southampton entered into a home game against Premier League side Bolton Wanderers. The game opened relatively strongly for the Saints, but it was the visiting side who scored first when Croatian striker Ivan Klasnić converted a Kevin Davies assist in the 31st minute. Southampton looked for a penalty shortly before half time, but Adam Lallana received a booking for diving. Despite a number of chances for Southampton in the second period, including a Rickie Lambert free kick which came close and a last minute effort from David Connolly, Bolton held on for the win to knock the South Coast club out of the League Cup in the Second Round for a consecutive season.

10 August 2010 First Round	Southampton	2–0	AFC Bournemouth	St Mary's Stadium, Southampton
19:45 BST	Lallana 64'; Oxlade-Chamberlain 86'	Report		Attendance: 17,135; Referee: Phil Crossley

24 August 2010 Second Round	Southampton	0–1	Bolton Wanderers	St Mary's Stadium, Southampton
19:45 BST		Report	Klasnić 31'	Attendance: 10,251; Referee: Keith Hill

== League Trophy ==
As defending champions, Southampton were looking to become the first team in the tournament's history to win the Football League Trophy in two consecutive years. The club began the competition in the First Round after failing to receive a bye to the next round. The draw took place on 14 August, giving Southampton a home tie against league rivals Swindon Town in the week commencing 30 August. The match came the day after the dismissal of manager Alan Pardew, and a lacklustre Saints team underperformed to lose 3–0 and exit the tournament, with substitute Lee Barnard receiving a red card in the 83rd minute following a tackle on Will Evans.

31 August 2010 First Round	Southampton	0–3	Swindon Town	St Mary's Stadium, Southampton
19:45 BST		Report	Péricard 29', 90+2'; Austin 63'	Attendance: 8,333; Referee: Darren Sheldrake

== Squad statistics ==
No.	Pos.	Nat.	Name	League			FA Cup			League Cup			League Trophy			Total			Discipline	
No.	Pos.	Nat.	Name	Apps.	Goals	Assists	Apps.	Goals	Assists	Apps.	Goals	Assists	Apps.	Goals	Assists	Apps.	Goals	Assists	Yellow card	Red card
1	GK	(England)	Kelvin Davis	46	0	1	1	0	0	2	0	0	1	0	0	50	0	1	0	0
2	DF	(England)	Frazer Richardson	13(7)	0	1	3	0	0	0	0	0	0	0	0	16(7)	0	1	2	0
3	DF	(England)	Dan Harding	35(1)	0	2	3(1)	0	0	1(1)	0	0	1	0	0	40(3)	0	2	4	0
4	MF	(France)	Morgan Schneiderlin	23(4)	0	2	2	0	0	1	0	0	1	0	0	27(4)	0	2	6	0
5	DF	(England)	Ryan Dickson	15(8)	1	5	1(2)	0	1	1	0	0	0(1)	0	0	17(11)	1	6	0	0
6	DF	(Portugal)	José Fonte	43	7	0	2	0	0	2	0	0	1	0	0	48	7	0	9	0
7	FW	(England)	Rickie Lambert	45	21	10	3(1)	0	0	1(1)	0	1	1	0	0	50(2)	21	11	1	0
8	FW	(Barbados)	Jonathan Forte	2(8)	2	0	0	0	0	0	0	0	0	0	0	2(8)	2	0	1	0
9	FW	(England)	Lee Barnard	24(12)	14	5	3	1	0	2	0	0	0(1)	0	0	29(13)	15	5	6	1
10	MF	(England)	Jason Puncheon	15	0	1	1	0	0	2	0	1	1	0	0	19	0	2	0	0
11	MF	(Brazil)	Guilherme do Prado	23(11)	9	6	3(1)	2	0	0	0	0	1	0	0	27(12)	11	6	3	0
12	DF	(England)	Danny Butterfield	32(2)	0	3	1(1)	0	0	2	0	0	1	0	0	36(3)	0	3	5	0
14	MF	(England)	Dean Hammond	40(1)	4	5	3	0	0	2	0	0	1	0	0	46(1)	4	5	11	0
15	DF	(Tunisia)	Radhi Jaïdi	31	3	0	2	0	0	0	0	0	1	0	0	34	3	0	5	0
17	DF	(England)	Aaron Martin	4(4)	0	0	1	0	0	1	0	0	0	0	0	6(4)	0	0	2	0
18	DF	(England)	Joseph Mills	0(2)	0	0	0	0	0	0(1)	0	0	0	0	0	0(3)	0	0	0	0
19	DF	(England)	Danny Seaborne	14(10)	0	0	3	0	0	1	0	0	0	0	0	18(10)	0	0	5	0
20	MF	(England)	Adam Lallana	30(6)	8	10	3	2	2	2	1	0	0	0	0	35(6)	11	12	3	0
21	MF	(England)	Lee Holmes	0(7)	0	1	1(1)	0	0	0(1)	0	0	0	0	0	1(9)	0	1	0	0
22	FW	(Republic of Ireland)	David Connolly	8(7)	3	1	0(1)	1	1	0(1)	0	0	1	0	0	9(9)	4	2	0	0
23	GK	(England)	Tommy Forecast	0	0	0	0	0	0	0	0	0	0	0	0	0	0	0	0	0
24	GK	(Poland)	Bartosz Białkowski	0	0	0	3	0	0	0	0	0	0	0	0	3	0	0	0	0
26	MF	(England)	Alex Oxlade-Chamberlain	27(7)	9	8	2(2)	0	0	1(1)	1	0	0(1)	0	0	30(11)	10	8	2	0
27	MF	(England)	Oscar Gobern	1(10)	1	1	1(1)	1	0	0	0	0	0	0	0	2(11)	2	1	0	1
28	MF	(England)	Callum McNish	0	0	0	0	0	0	0	0	0	0	0	0	0	0	0	0	0
29	MF	(Wales)	Ryan Doble	0	0	0	0	0	0	0	0	0	0	0	0	0	0	0	0	0
30	MF	(England)	Richard Chaplow	27(6)	4	0	2	1	0	0	0	0	0	0	0	29(6)	5	0	7	0
31	MF	(England)	Harlee Dean	0	0	0	0	0	0	0	0	0	0	0	0	0	0	0	0	0
32	MF	(France)	Dany N'Guessan	2(4)	0	1	0(1)	0	0	0	0	0	0	0	0	2(5)	0	1	1	0
33	MF	(England)	Dale Stephens	5(1)	0	0	0	0	0	0	0	0	0	0	0	5(1)	0	0	0	0
36	MF	(Wales)	Anthony Pulis	0	0	0	0	0	0	0	0	0	0	0	0	0	0	0	0	0
37	DF	(England)	Jack Saville	0	0	0	0	0	0	0	0	0	0	0	0	0	0	0	0	0
38	DF	(England)	Ben Reeves	0	0	0	0	0	0	0	0	0	0	0	0	0	0	0	0	0
39	DF	(England)	Ryan Tafazolli	0	0	0	0	0	0	0	0	0	0	0	0	0	0	0	0	0
40	FW	(England)	Tony Garrod	0	0	0	0	0	0	0	0	0	0	0	0	0	0	0	0	0
Players who left the club before the end of the season
16	MF	(England)	Paul Wotton	0(2)	0	0	0	0	0	1	0	0	0	0	0	1(2)	0	0	0	0
31	FW	(England)	Nicholas Bignall	0(3)	0	0	0	0	0	0	0	0	0	0	0	0(3)	0	0	0	0
33	GK	(England)	James Shea	0	0	0	0	0	0	0	0	0	0	0	0	0	0	0	0	0

=== Most appearances ===
	Pos.	Nat.	Name	League		FA Cup		League Cup		League Trophy		Total		
	Pos.	Nat.	Name	Strt.	Sub.	Strt.	Sub.	Strt.	Sub.	Strt.	Sub.	Strt.	Sub.	Total
1	FW	(England)	Rickie Lambert	45	0	3	1	1	1	1	0	50	2	52
2	GK	(England)	Kelvin Davis	46	0	1	0	2	0	1	0	50	0	50
3	DF	(Portugal)	José Fonte	43	0	2	0	2	0	1	0	48	0	48
4	MF	(England)	Dean Hammond	40	1	3	0	2	0	1	0	46	1	47
5	DF	(England)	Dan Harding	35	1	3	1	1	1	1	0	40	3	43
6	FW	(England)	Lee Barnard	24	12	3	0	2	0	0	1	29	13	42
7	MF	(England)	Adam Lallana	30	6	3	0	2	0	0	0	35	6	41
7	MF	(England)	Alex Oxlade-Chamberlain	27	7	2	2	1	1	0	1	30	11	41
9	DF	(England)	Danny Butterfield	32	2	1	1	2	0	1	0	36	3	39
9	MF	(Brazil)	Guilherme do Prado	23	11	3	1	0	0	1	0	27	12	39

=== Top goalscorers ===
	Pos.	Nat.	Name	League		FA Cup		League Cup		League Trophy		Total		
	Pos.	Nat.	Name	Gls.	Apps.	Gls.	Apps.	Gls.	Apps.	Gls.	Apps.	Gls.	Apps.	GPG
1	FW	(England)	Rickie Lambert	21	45	0	4	0	2	0	1	21	52	0.40
2	FW	(England)	Lee Barnard	14	36	1	3	0	2	0	1	15	42	0.35
3	MF	(Brazil)	Guilherme do Prado	9	34	2	4	0	0	0	1	11	39	0.28
3	MF	(England)	Adam Lallana	8	36	3	3	0	2	0	0	11	41	0.26
5	MF	(England)	Alex Oxlade-Chamberlain	9	34	0	4	1	2	0	1	10	41	0.24
6	DF	(Portugal)	José Fonte	7	43	0	2	0	2	0	1	7	48	0.14
7	MF	(England)	Richard Chaplow	4	33	1	2	0	0	0	0	5	35	0.14
8	FW	(Republic of Ireland)	David Connolly	3	15	1	1	0	1	0	1	4	18	0.22
8	MF	(England)	Dean Hammond	4	41	0	3	0	2	0	1	4	47	0.08
10	DF	(Tunisia)	Radhi Jaïdi	3	31	0	2	0	0	0	1	3	34	0.08

=== Top assistants ===
	Pos.	Nat.	Name	League		FA Cup		League Cup		League Trophy		Total		
	Pos.	Nat.	Name	Asst.	Apps.	Asst.	Apps.	Asst.	Apps.	Asst.	Apps.	Asst.	Apps.	APG
1	MF	(England)	Adam Lallana	10	36	2	3	0	2	0	0	12	41	0.29
2	FW	(England)	Rickie Lambert	10	45	0	4	1	2	0	1	11	52	0.21
3	MF	(England)	Alex Oxlade-Chamberlain	8	34	0	4	0	2	0	1	8	41	0.19
4	DF	(England)	Ryan Dickson	5	23	1	3	0	1	0	1	6	28	0.21
4	MF	(Brazil)	Guilherme do Prado	6	34	0	4	0	0	0	1	6	39	0.15
6	FW	(England)	Lee Barnard	5	36	0	3	0	2	0	1	5	42	0.11
6	MF	(England)	Dean Hammond	5	41	0	3	0	2	0	1	5	47	0.10
8	DF	(England)	Danny Butterfield	3	34	0	2	0	2	0	1	3	39	0.07
9	FW	(Republic of Ireland)	David Connolly	1	15	1	1	0	1	0	1	2	18	0.11
9	MF	(England)	Jason Puncheon	1	15	0	1	1	2	0	1	2	19	0.10
9	MF	(France)	Morgan Schneiderlin	2	27	0	2	0	1	0	1	2	31	0.06
9	DF	(England)	Dan Harding	2	36	0	4	0	2	0	1	2	43	0.04

== Transfers ==
Players transferred in
Date	Pos.	Name	From	Fee	Ref.
1 July 2010	DF	(England) Ryan Dickson	(England) Brentford	£125,000	
6 July 2010	DF	(England) Frazer Richardson	(England) Charlton Athletic	Undisclosed	
16 July 2010	DF	(England) Danny Butterfield	(England) Crystal Palace	Free (released)	
27 August 2010	MF	(England) Harlee Dean	(England) Dagenham & Redbridge	Undisclosed	
1 January 2011	MF	(England) Richard Chaplow	(England) Preston North End	Undisclosed	
20 January 2011	MF	(Brazil) Guilherme do Prado	(Italy) Cesena	Undisclosed	
31 January 2011	FW	(Barbados) Jonathan Forte	(England) Scunthorpe United	Undisclosed	
5 April 2011	DF	(England) Jack Stephens	(England) Plymouth Argyle	£150,000	
Players loaned in
Date from	Pos.	Name	From	Date to	Ref.
23 August 2010	MF	(Brazil) Guilherme do Prado	(Italy) Cesena	20 January 2011	
30 September 2010	MF	(England) Richard Chaplow	(England) Preston North End	31 December 2010	
8 October 2010	FW	(England) Nicholas Bignall	(England) Reading	4 November 2010	
26 January 2011	MF	(France) Dany N'Guessan	(England) Leicester City	End of season	
18 February 2011	GK	(England) James Shea	(England) Arsenal	3 March 2011	
25 March 2011	MF	(England) Dale Stephens	(England) Oldham Athletic	End of season	
Players loaned out
Date from	Pos.	Name	To	Date to	Ref.
7 October 2010	MF	(Wales) Anthony Pulis	(England) Stockport County	4 January 2011	
19 October 2010	DF	(England) Joseph Mills	(England) Doncaster Rovers	End of season	
4 November 2010	DF	(England) Jack Saville	(England) Stockport County	4 December 2010	
8 November 2010	MF	(England) Paul Wotton	(England) Oxford United	31 December 2010	
16 November 2010	MF	(England) Jason Puncheon	(England) Millwall	3 January 2011	
3 January 2011	DF	(England) Ryan Tafazolli	(England) Salisbury City	3 February 2011	
1 January 2011	MF	(England) Paul Wotton	(England) Yeovil Town	28 January 2011	
31 January 2011	MF	(England) Jason Puncheon	(England) Blackpool	End of season	
31 January 2011	GK	(England) Tommy Forecast	(England) Eastbourne Borough	28 February 2011	
8 February 2011	MF	(Wales) Anthony Pulis	(England) Barnet	End of season	
11 February 2011	MF	(England) Harlee Dean	(England) Bishop's Stortford	11 March 2011	
11 February 2011	FW	(England) Tony Garrod	(England) Bishop's Stortford	11 March 2011	
17 February 2011	FW	(Wales) Ryan Doble	(England) Stockport County	17 March 2011	
22 March 2011	FW	(Wales) Ryan Doble	(England) Oxford United	End of season	
Players released
Date	Pos.	Name	Subsequent club	Join date	Ref.
1 July 2010	DF	(Scotland) Graeme Murty	Unattached		
1 July 2010	DF	(England) Chris Perry	Unattached		
1 July 2010	DF	(England) Jon Otsemobor	(England) Sheffield Wednesday	1 July 2010	
1 July 2010	GK	(England) Michael Poke	(England) Brighton & Hove Albion	1 July 2010	
1 July 2010	MF	(Trinidad and Tobago) Jake Thomson	(England) Exeter City	1 July 2010	
1 July 2010	MF	(England) Simon Gillett	(England) Doncaster Rovers	8 July 2010	
1 July 2010	DF	(England) Olly Lancashire	(England) Walsall	14 July 2010	
1 July 2010	MF	(England) Tom Dunford	(England) Sutton United	19 July 2010	
1 July 2010	DF	(Wales) Lloyd James	(England) Colchester United	22 July 2010	
1 July 2010	MF	(Wales) Garyn Preen	(England) Burton Albion	23 July 2010	
1 July 2010	DF	(England) Lee Molyneux	(England) Plymouth Argyle	3 August 2010	
1 July 2010	FW	(Wales) Kayne McLaggon	(England) Salisbury City	4 August 2010	
1 July 2010	DF	(England) Wayne Thomas	(England) Doncaster Rovers	10 August 2010	
1 July 2010	FW	(England) Jamie White	(England) Eastleigh	21 December 2010	
1 July 2010	MF	(England) Jack Boyle	(England) Salisbury City	25 January 2011	
28 January 2011	MF	(England) Paul Wotton	(England) Yeovil Town	28 January 2011	
