= Nabby =

Nabby may refer to:

- Evgeni Nabokov, a.k.a. Nabby, a professional ice hockey player
- Abigail Adams Smith, a.k.a. Nabby Adams, the daughter of Abigail and John Adams
- Nabby Island, an uninhabited island located within 300 feet of Three Mile Island (Lake Winnipesaukee)

== See also ==
- Nab (disambiguation)
- Naby (disambiguation)
