= Jimmy Kébé =

Malian-French footballer (born 1984)

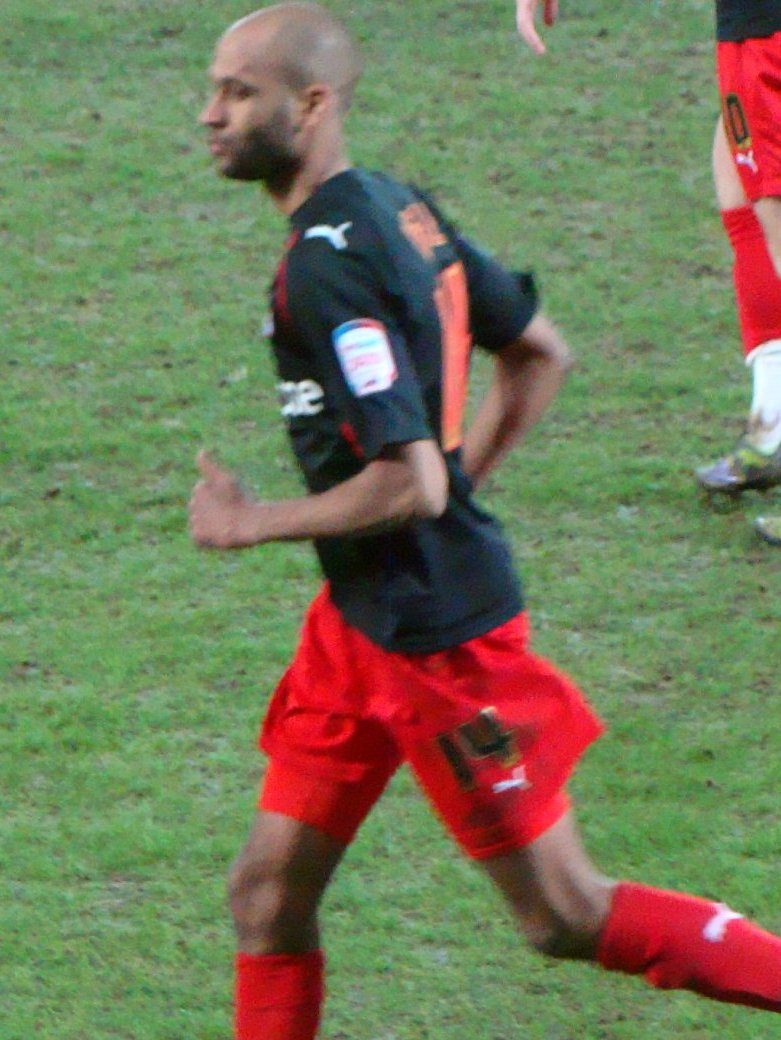
- Kébé playing for Reading in 2011

Personal information
- Full name: Jimmy Boubou Kébé
- Date of birth: 19 January 1984 (age 42)
- Place of birth: Vitry-sur-Seine, France
- Height: 1.87 m (6 ft 2 in)
- Position: Right winger

Senior career*
Years	Team	Apps	(Gls)
2002–2008	Lens	0	(0)
2002–2006	Lens B	57	(5)
2006–2007	→ Châteauroux (loan)	18	(2)
2007–2008	→ Boulogne (loan)	16	(5)
2008–2013	Reading	175	(29)
2013–2015	Crystal Palace	6	(0)
2014	→ Leeds United (loan)	9	(1)
2015–2016	Real Mallorca	0	(0)
Total		281	(42)

International career
2004	Mali U23	4	(0)
2005–2009	Mali	2	(0)
- * Club domestic league appearances and goals

Jimmy Boubou Kébé (born 19 January 1984) is a former professional footballer who played as a right winger. Born in France, he represented Mali at international level.

== Club career ==
=== Early life and career ===
Jimmy Boubou Kébé was born on 19 January 1984 in Vitry-sur-Seine, Val-de-Marne. He started his footballing career at RC Lens. He played predominately for the B team before having successful loan spells at clubs Châteauroux and Boulogne.

=== Reading ===
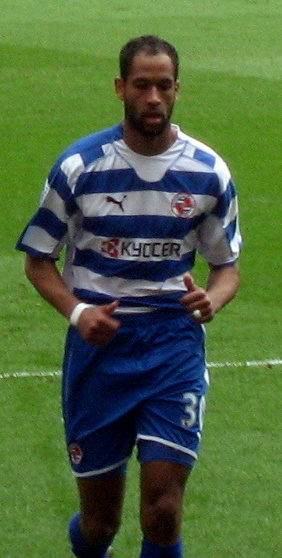
Kébé playing for Reading in 2008

On 16 January 2008, Kébé agreed to join Reading after being spotted by the then scout Brian McDermott, but his then club Boulogne initially refused to let him end his season-long loan early. Kébé went on strike in order for Boulogne to release him from his loan spell early to join Reading. On 28 January 2008, Reading announced that Kébé had signed a 2 1/2-year contract with them, moving for an undisclosed fee.

He made his debut for Reading as a substitute, coming on for John Oster late into a 1–0 away defeat to Everton on 9 February 2008 and should have opened his Reading account minutes later. He scored his first Reading goal in the 1–2 home defeat against Southampton on 22 November 2008. On 6 December 2008 he was sent off for the first time in his Reading career for aiming an elbow towards Barnsley defender Dennis Souza.

Kébé has since extended his contract until the summer of 2012. 2010 saw an up-turn in Kébé's goal-scoring form, notching up 13 goals in the Championship in the 2010 calendar year. On 21 August 2010, Kébé played his 100th game for Reading, appearing in a 1–1 home draw with Nottingham Forest.

The 2011–12 season saw a further development in Kébé's position at Reading, with a well-publicised dispute over his contract. Having shown himself to be one of Reading's key players in the 2010–11 playoff push, the club were eager to see him sign a new long term contract to ward off interest from other clubs such as Leicester City as his contract was at the time due to run out at the end of the 2011–12 season. It soon became clear that Kébé wanted to stay at the club, but was reluctant to sign a two-year deal rather than the three-year deal he wanted. Reading could not afford to offer Kébé a three-year, despite being willing to make him one of their highest earners. This ongoing contract saga continued into the new year, with McDermott, by now Reading's manager, becoming increasingly resigned to the possibility of losing his prized winger. On 5 January 2012, it was confirmed that Reading had offered Kebe a new contract for the three years that he wanted. On 24 January 2012, following Anton Zingarevich's takeover of Reading, Kebe signed a new contract that will keep him at Reading until 2014.

Kebe scored his first Premier League goal in a 2–2 draw at home to Newcastle United. He scored on his return from injury with a cool finish at home to Arsenal in a 5–2 defeat. His next goal came at home to West Bromwich Albion with a far post diving header, to pull one back with 8 minutes to go. This sparked a dramatic comeback from the Royals who scored two more late goals in the dying moments to win 3–2. In January 2013, Kébé announced on his official Twitter page that he had joined Newcastle, this was then picked up by several media outlets, only for Kébé to reveal that it had been a joke due to the number of French-speaking players Newcastle had recently signed.

Kebe scored both the goals as Reading beat Sunderland at home 2–1, to move out of the relegation zone. After the match Reading captain Jobi McAnuff proclaimed Kébé to be "a big player for Reading" and "a real sight to see when he's in full flow and I'm glad he's in our side when he's on song like this.". After the same game, Kébé also received special praise from McDermott, who proclaimed Kébé "has been brilliant for me in the three years I have had this job".

He then injured his groin in the early minutes of the 1–3 defeat to Everton on 2 March 2013, and was ruled out for the rest of the season. Reading were subsequently relegated from the Premier League at the end of the season.

In August 2013, after six months out injured with a groin strain, Kébé was set to make a comeback for Reading in a match against Peterborough in the League Cup, however he controversially dropped out of contention with an injury, with manager Nigel Adkins unhappy about the timing after speculation linking Kébé with a move to Crystal Palace. Kébé revealed that he did not refuse to play and that he missed the game due to a hamstring injury.

=== Crystal Palace ===
On 31 August 2013, Kébé was signed by manager Ian Holloway for Crystal Palace on a three-year contract for an undisclosed fee. Kébé made his Palace debut against Manchester United on 14 September in a 2–0 away defeat at Old Trafford. Not long after Kébé joined the club, Holloway left, and was replaced by Tony Pulis.

On 8 January 2014, after dropping down the pecking order under Pulis, Leeds United approached Crystal Palace to take Kébé on loan for the remainder of the season and to reunite with his former Reading manager Brian McDermott. Pulis confirmed in his pre-match press conference on 9 January that Kébé had been in talks with Leeds and was set to join them on loan until the end of the 2013–14 season. on 23 January 2015 his Crystal Palace Contract was terminated.

==== Leeds United (loan) ====
On 10 January 2014, Kébé signed on a six-month loan for Leeds United. The deal contained a clause to make the move permanent at the end of the season if Leeds were promoted.

Kébé made his Leeds debut on 11 January, starting the game in a 6–0 defeat against Sheffield Wednesday. On 1 February 2014, only the day after the alleged dismissal of Kébé's mentor Brian McDermott, Kébé scored his first goal for Leeds in a 5–1 victory against local rivals Huddersfield Town. On 1 March, in Leeds draw against Queens Park Rangers Kébé was subject of chants to be substituted, with Leeds fans calling for the arrival of Sam Byram due to Kébé's mixed displays since signing for the club. After the game, manager Brian McDermott leapt to the defence of Kébé's performances and work rate and proclaimed he believed Kébé could still become a fans' favourite. At the end of the 2013–14 season, Leeds decided against making Kebe's loan permanent and he returned to Palace, where upon his return he was deemed surplus to requirements.

=== Real Mallorca ===
Kébé joined Real Mallorca, but did not make a single appearance. He later retired, and now plays professional poker, where he is ranked 6,473 in the world.

== International career ==
He was part of the Mali football team at the 2004 Summer Olympics, finishing top of Group A, but losing to Italy 1–0 (aet) in the next round.

== Career statistics ==
=== Club ===
Appearances and goals by club, season and competition
Club	Season	League			National cup		League cup		Other		Total	
Club	Season	Division	Apps	Goals	Apps	Goals	Apps	Goals	Apps	Goals	Apps	Goals
Reading	2007–08	Premier League	5	0	0	0	0	0	—		5	0
Reading	2008–09	Championship	41	2	1	0	0	0	2 (Note: Appearances in Championship play-offs)	0	44	2
Reading	2009–10	Championship	42	10	5	2	0	0	—		47	12
Reading	2010–11	Championship	36	9	3	0	2	0	1	0	42	9
Reading	2011–12	Championship	33	3	0	0	0	0	—		33	3
Reading	2012–13	Premier League	18	5	0	0	1	0	—		19	5
Reading	Total		175	29	9	2	3	0	3	0	190	31
Crystal Palace	2013–14	Premier League	6	0	0	0	0	0	—		6	0
Crystal Palace	2014–15	Premier League	0	0	0	0	0	0	—		0	0
Crystal Palace	Total		6	0	0	0	0	0	—		6	0
Leeds United (loan)	2013–14	Championship	9	1	0	0	0	0	—		9	1
Career total			190	30	9	2	3	0	3	0	205	32

=== International ===
Appearances and goals by national team and year
National team	Year	Apps	Goals
Mali	2005	1	0
Mali	2009	1	0
Total		2	0

== Honours ==
Reading

- Football League Championship: 2011–12

Individual

- Reading F.C. Hall of Fame: 2022
