= 2009–10 Reading F.C. season =

Reading F.C.
2009–10 season
- Chairman: John Madejski
- Manager: Brendan Rodgers (until 16 December 2009); Brian McDermott (from 17 December 2009)
- Football League Championship: 9th
- FA Cup: Quarter-final vs Aston Villa
- Football League Cup: 2nd round vs Barnsley
- Top goalscorer: League: Gylfi Sigurðsson (16); All: Gylfi Sigurðsson (20)
- Highest home attendance: 23,656 (vs Liverpool F.C.)
- Lowest home attendance: 5,576 (vs Barnsley)
| Home colours | Away colours |

Reading Football Club played the 2009–10 season in the Football League Championship, having lost 3–0 on aggregate to Burnley in the Championship playoff semi-final. Reading had a new manager, Brian McDermott, who succeeded ex-boss Brendan Rodgers on 27 January 2010, after excelling in an FA Cup run as caretaker manager.

== Review & events ==
=== Preseason – July ===
Reading travelled to Didcot Town for their first Pre-Season match where they ran out 5–1 winners with goals from Sigurdsson, Bignall, Henry, Harper and Church. Reading then lost 2–1 at Kettering Town with Church (11') scoring the only goal for the Berkshire side. Reading drew 2–2 with Premier League side, Chelsea in their final Pre-Season match, with goals from Jimmy Kebe and Scott Davies. However between the defeat to Kettering Town and draw with Chelsea Reading embarked on a tour of Sweden

==== Tour of Sweden ====
Reading beat Jonsereds 8–0 with Robson-Kanu scoring a hat trick, Church and Davies scoring braces and a goal from Gunnarsson. The Royals' next game was against Tolo IF whom they beat 4–0 with Shane Long scoring all four of Reading's goals. Reading played Qviding in their 3rd and final game of the tour, winning 2–1, with both goals scored by Noel Hunt after Reading were 1–0 down.

==== Reading XI, reserve and other matches ====
A Reading XI beat Tooting & Mitcham 3–0. Later on in the preseason campaign another Reading XI visited Farnborough where the Hampshire side were eventual 3–2 winners. Reading also played a 'Champions XI' in a Testimonial match, for former player Graeme Murty, winning the match 3–2.

=== August ===
With the kick-off to the 2009–10 Championship season beginning on Saturday 8 August, Reading played Nottingham Forest and just like the season before, drew. Other fixtures in August were the heavy defeats to Newcastle and Sheffield United. However a draw away at Swansea and a convincing win at Barnsley were positives. Top scorer at the end of August is Noel Hunt

=== September ===
First match of the month saw Reading draw at home to Doncaster Rovers 0–0. The Royals then lost at home to Cardiff 1–0. The defeat was followed up by a loss to Peterborough. Despite the Royals being 2–0 up at half time, the lead was lost and Peterborough ended up winning 3–2. The month ended with further disappointment at the Madejski Stadium where, despite again taking the lead through an early goal from Grzegorz Rasiak, Reading could only draw 1–1 with Watford.

=== October ===
Leroy Lita returned to the Madejski Stadium on 2 October and scored the visitors second goal, as Middlesbrough won 2–0, extending Reading's winless run at home to 14 league games.

== Squad ==
As of match played 2 May 2010

| No. | Name | Nationality | Position | Date of birth (age) | Signed from | Signed in | Contract ends | Apps. | Goals |
Goalkeepers
| 1 | Adam Federici | (Australia) | GK | 31 January 1985 (aged 25) | Torres | 2005 | | 70 | 1 |
| 21 | Ben Hamer | (England) | GK | 20 November 1987 (aged 22) | Academy | 2006 | | 3 | 0 |
| 31 | Mikkel Andersen | (Denmark) | GK | 17 December 1988 (aged 21) | AB | 2007 | | 0 | 0 |
| 41 | Alex McCarthy | (England) | GK | 3 December 1989 (aged 20) | Academy | 2007 | | 0 | 0 |
Defenders
| 2 | Liam Rosenior | (England) | DF | 9 July 1984 (aged 25) | Fulham | 2007 | 2010 | 69 | 1 |
| 3 | Chris Armstrong | (Scotland) (Note: Chris Armstrong was born in Newcastle upon Tyne, England, but qualified to represent Scotland internationally through his grandmother, making his international debut for Scotland B in 2007.) | DF | 5 August 1982 (aged 27) | Sheffield United | 2008 | | 42 | 1 |
| 5 | Matt Mills | (England) | DF | 14 July 1986 (aged 23) | Doncaster Rovers | 2009 | | 30 | 2 |
| 16 | Ívar Ingimarsson (club captain) | (Iceland) | DF | 20 August 1977 (aged 32) | Wolverhampton Wanderers | 2003 | | 266 | 12 |
| 22 | Julian Kelly | (England) | DF | 6 September 1989 (aged 20) | Academy | 2008 | | 12 | 0 |
| 24 | Ryan Bertrand | (England) | DF | 5 August 1989 (aged 20) | on loan from Chelsea | 2009 | 2010 | 51 | 1 |
| 26 | Alex Pearce (vice-captain) | (Scotland) (Note: Alex Pearce was born in Wallingford, England, but also qualified to represent Scotland and the Republic of Ireland internationally through his parents and has represented Scotland at youth and U-21 level. He would, however, later be called up and make his full international debut for the Republic of Ireland in September 2012.) | DF | 9 November 1988 (aged 21) | Academy | 2006 | | 53 | 6 |
| 35 | Shaun Cummings | (England) (Note: Cummings was born in Hammersmith, England, but qualified to represent Jamaica and made his international debut for Jamaica in September 2013.) | DF | 5 August 1989 (aged 20) | Chelsea | 2009 | | 8 | 0 |
| 40 | Andy Griffin | (England) | DF | 17 March 1979 (aged 31) | on loan from Stoke City | 2010 | 2010 | 25 | 0 |
| 44 | Zurab Khizanishvili | (Georgia (country)) | DF | 6 October 1981 (aged 28) | on loan from Blackburn Rovers | 2010 | 2010 | 15 | 0 |
Midfielders
| 4 | Kalifa Cissé | (Mali) (Note: Kalifa Cissé was born in Dreux, France, but qualified to represent Mali internationally and made his international debut for Mali in March 2008, having previously represented them at U-20 level.) | MF | 9 January 1984 (aged 26) | Boavista | 2007 | 2010 | 83 | 7 |
| 6 | Brynjar Gunnarsson | (Iceland) | MF | 16 October 1975 (aged 34) | Watford | 2005 | | 143 | 10 |
| 7 | Jay Tabb | (Republic of Ireland) (Note: Jay Tabb was born in Tooting, England, but also qualified to represent the Republic of Ireland internationally, and represented Ireland at U-21 level in 2005.) | MF | 21 February 1984 (aged 26) | Coventry City | 2009 | 2011 | 43 | 0 |
| 8 | Marek Matějovský | (Czech Republic) | MF | 20 December 1981 (aged 28) | Mladá Boleslav | 2008 | 2011 | 56 | 2 |
| 11 | Jobi McAnuff | (Jamaica) (Note: McAnuff was born in Enfield, England, but qualified to represent Jamaica and made his international debut for Jamaica in May 2002.) | MF | 9 November 1981 (aged 28) | Watford | 2009 | 2012 | 41 | 3 |
| 14 | Jimmy Kébé | (Mali) (Note: Jimmy Kébé was born in Vitry-sur-Seine, France, but qualified to represent Mali internationally and made his international debut for Mali in 2004.) | MF | 19 January 1984 (aged 26) | Lens | 2008 | 2010 | 96 | 14 |
| 17 | James Henry | (England) (Note: James Henry was born in Reading, England, but also qualified to represent Scotland internationally through his parents and has represented Scotland at youth level. However, he would later represent England at youth level.) | MF | 9 July 1987 (aged 22) | Academy | 2004 | | 18 | 4 |
| 19 | Hal Robson-Kanu | (England) (Note: Hal Robson-Kanu was born in Ealing, England, and represented England at U-19 and U-20 level, but also qualified to represent Wales through his grandmother and made his international debut for the Welsh U-21 side in May 2010 before making his full international debut for Wales five days later.) | MF | 21 May 1989 (aged 20) | Academy | 2007 | | 18 | 0 |
| 20 | Jem Karacan | (Turkey) (Note: Jem Karacan was born in Lewisham, England, but also qualifies to represent Turkey internationally through his father and has represented Turkey at every youth level.) | MF | 21 February 1989 (aged 21) | Academy | 2007 | | 48 | 2 |
| 25 | Gylfi Sigurðsson | (Iceland) | MF | 8 September 1989 (aged 20) | Academy | 2008 | | 47 | 20 |
| 27 | Scott Davies | (Republic of Ireland) (Note: Scott Davies was born in Aylesbury, England, but also qualified to represent the Republic of Ireland internationally and has represented them at youth and U-21 level.) | MF | 9 July 1987 (aged 22) | Academy | 2004 | | 5 | 0 |
| 28 | Michail Antonio | (England) (Note: Michail Antonio was born in Wandsworth, England, but also qualified to represent Jamaica internationally, going on to make his debut for Jamaica in 2021.) | MF | 8 January 1989 (aged 21) | Tooting & Mitcham United | 2008 | 2010 | 2 | 0 |
| 30 | Oliver Bozanic | (Australia) | MF | 8 January 1989 (aged 21) | Central Coast Mariners | 2007 | | 0 | 0 |
| 33 | Mitchell Bryant | (England) | MF | 22 December 1990 (aged 19) | Manchester United | 2007 | | 0 | 0 |
| 34 | Brian Howard | (England) | MF | 23 January 1983 (aged 27) | Sheffield United | 2009 | 2012 | 39 | 3 |
| 37 | Jake Taylor | (Wales) (Note: Taylor was born in Ascot, England, and but chose to represent Wales, qualifying through his grandfather who has born in Barry. Taylor has represented Wales at U-17, U-19 and U-21 level.) | MF | 22 December 1990 (aged 19) | Academy | 2009 | | 0 | 0 |
| 38 | Abdulai Bell-Baggie | (England) (Note: Bell-Baggie was born in Sierra Leone, but qualified to represent England, representing the U-16's and U-17's before making his debut for Sierra Leone in June 2013.) | MF | 28 April 1992 (aged 18) | Academy | 2009 | | 0 | 0 |
Forwards
| 9 | Shane Long | (Republic of Ireland) | FW | 22 January 1987 (aged 23) | Cork City | 2005 | | 151 | 27 |
| 10 | Noel Hunt | (Republic of Ireland) | FW | 26 December 1982 (aged 27) | Dundee United | 2008 | 2011 | 51 | 15 |
| 12 | Dave Mooney | (Republic of Ireland) | FW | 30 October 1984 (aged 25) | Cork City | 2008 | 2011 | 4 | 2 |
| 18 | Simon Church | (Wales) (Note: Simon Church was born in High Wycombe, England, but also qualifies to represent Wales through his grandparents and made his international debut for the Welsh U-21 side in August 2007 before making his full international debut for Wales in May 2009.) | FW | 10 December 1988 (aged 21) | Academy | 2007 | | 44 | 12 |
| 23 | Grzegorz Rasiak | (Poland) | FW | 12 January 1979 (aged 31) | Southampton | 2009 | 2011 | 34 | 9 |
| 29 | Nicholas Bignall | (England) | FW | 11 July 1990 (aged 19) | Academy | 2008 | | 3 | 2 |
| 32 | Radoslav Vasilev | (Bulgaria) | FW | 12 October 1990 (aged 19) | Slavia Sofia | 2009 | | 0 | 0 |
| 36 | Gunnar Heiðar Þorvaldsson | (Iceland) | FW | 1 April 1982 (aged 28) | on loan from Esbjerg fB | 2010 | 2010 | 5 | 0 |
Out on loan
Left during the season
| 11 | Stephen Hunt | (Republic of Ireland) | MF | 1 August 1981 (aged 28) | Brentford | 2005 | | 173 | 20 |
| 15 | James Harper | (England) | MF | 9 November 1980 (aged 29) | Arsenal | 2001 | | 361 | 23 |
| 23 | André Bikey | (Cameroon) | DF | 8 January 1985 (aged 25) | Lokomotiv Moscow | 2007 | 2010 | 73 | 7 |
| 48 | Darren O'Dea | (Republic of Ireland) | DF | 4 February 1987 (aged 23) | on loan from Celtic | 2009 | 2009 | 8 | 0 |

== Transfers ==
=== In ===
| Date | Position | Nationality | Name | From | Fee |
|---|---|---|---|---|---|
| 8 August 2009 | CB | (England) | Matt Mills | Doncaster Rovers | £2,000,000 |
| 27 August 2009 | LM | (Jamaica) | Jobi McAnuff | Watford | Undisclosed |
| 27 August 2009 | FW | (Poland) | Grzegorz Rasiak | Southampton | Undisclosed |
| 2 September 2009 | RB | (England) | Shaun Cummings | Chelsea | Undisclosed |
| 3 September 2009 | CM | (England) | Brian Howard | Sheffield United | Undisclosed |

=== Out ===
| Date | Position | Nationality | Name | To | Fee |
|---|---|---|---|---|---|
| 30 June 2009 | FW | (Republic of Ireland) | Kevin Doyle | Wolves | Undisclosed |
| 11 August 2009 | MF | (Republic of Ireland) | Stephen Hunt | Hull City | Undisclosed |
| 18 August 2009 | CB | (Cameroon) | André Bikey | Burnley | Undisclosed |
| 28 January 2010 | MF | (England) | James Harper | Sheffield United | Free |

=== Loans in ===
| Date from | Date to | Position | Nationality | Name | From |
|---|---|---|---|---|---|
| 17 July 2009 | Season-long | LB | (England) | Ryan Bertrand | Chelsea |
| 1 September 2009 | 26 December 2009 | CB | (Republic of Ireland) | Darren O'Dea | (Scotland) Celtic |
| 3 January 2010 | End of the season | FW | (Iceland) | Gunnar Heiðar Þorvaldsson | (Denmark) Esbjerg |
| 11 January 2010 | End of the season | RB | (England) | Andy Griffin | Stoke City |
| 25 January 2010 | End of the season | CB | (Georgia (country)) | Zurab Khizanishvili | Blackburn Rovers |

=== Loans out ===
| Date from | Date to | Position | Nationality | Name | To |
|---|---|---|---|---|---|
| 17 July 2009 | 6 Months | MF | (Australia) | Oliver Bozanic | Cheltenham Town |
| 5 August 2009 | 6 Months | GK | (England) | Alex McCarthy | Yeovil Town |
| 31 August 2009 | 4 Months | FW | (England) | Nicholas Bignall | Stockport County |
| 1 September 2009 | 4 Months | GK | (Denmark) | Mikkel Andersen | Bristol Rovers |
| 2 September 2009 | Season-long | RB | (England) | Liam Rosenior | Ipswich Town |
| 2 September 2009 | Season-long | MF | (England) | James Harper | Sheffield United |
| 10 September 2009 | 29 December 2009 | MF | (England) | James Henry | Millwall |

=== Released ===
| Date | Position | Nationality | Name | Joined | Date |
|---|---|---|---|---|---|
| 7 May 2010 | MF | (Australia) | Oliver Bozanic | (Australia) Central Coast Mariners | 10 May 2010 |
| 7 May 2010 | MF | (England) | Mitchell Bryant | | |
| 7 May 2010 | DF | (England) | Liam Rosenior | Hull City | 29 October 2010 |
| 7 May 2010 | FW | (Bulgaria) | Radoslav Vasilev | (Bulgaria) Slavia Sofia | July 2010 |

== Competitions ==
| Competition | Started round | Final position / round | First match | Last match |
|---|---|---|---|---|
| Football League Championship 2009–10 | — | 9 | 8 August 2009 | 2 May 2010 |
| Football League Cup | 1st round | 2nd round | 11 August 2009 | 25 August 2009 |
| FA Cup | 3rd round | 6th round | 2 January 2010 | 7 March 2010 |

Updated to match played 2 May 2011
Source: Competitions

=== Championship ===
==== Results summary ====
| Overall | | | | | | | | Home | | | | | | Away | | | | | |
| Pld | W | D | L | GF | GA | GD | Pts | W | D | L | GF | GA | GD | W | D | L | GF | GA | GD |
|---|---|---|---|---|---|---|---|---|---|---|---|---|---|---|---|---|---|---|---|
| 46 | 17 | 12 | 17 | 68 | 63 | +5 | 63 | 10 | 7 | 6 | 39 | 22 | +17 | 7 | 5 | 11 | 29 | 41 | −12 |

Last updated: 28 December 2011.
Source: Reading FC

==== Results by round ====
| Round | 1 | 2 | 3 | 4 | 5 | 6 | 7 | 8 | 9 | 10 | 11 | 12 | 13 | 14 | 15 | 16 | 17 | 18 | 19 | 20 | 21 | 22 | 23 | 24 | 25 | 26 | 27 | 28 | 29 | 30 | 31 | 32 | 33 | 34 | 35 | 36 | 37 | 38 | 39 | 40 | 41 | 42 | 43 | 44 | 45 | 46 |
|---|---|---|---|---|---|---|---|---|---|---|---|---|---|---|---|---|---|---|---|---|---|---|---|---|---|---|---|---|---|---|---|---|---|---|---|---|---|---|---|---|---|---|---|---|---|---|
| Ground | H | H | A | A | H | A | H | H | A | H | A | H | A | A | H | A | H | H | A | A | H | H | A | H | A | A | A | H | A | H | A | A | H | H | H | A | A | H | A | H | A | H | H | A | A | H |
| Result | D | L | D | L | W | D | L | L | D | W | L | L | L | L | W | D | W | L | W | L | D | D | D | L | L | L | W | W | W | W | L | W | W | W | W | D | W | D | L | W | D | L | W | D | L | W |
| Position | 18 | 23 | 19 | 21 | 18 | 17 | 18 | 21 | 21 | 19 | 20 | 21 | 21 | 22 | 21 | 22 | 20 | 21 | 18 | 19 | 21 | 20 | 19 | 20 | 21 | 23 | 22 | 22 | 22 | 18 | 20 | 18 | 17 | 16 | 14 | 13 | 11 | 11 | 12 | 12 | 11 | 11 | 9 | 9 | 11 | 9 |

Source: BBC Sport
A = Away; H = Home; W = Win; D = Draw; L = Loss

==== Results ====
| 8 August 2009 1 | Reading | 0–0 | Nottingham Forest | Madejski Stadium |
| 15:00 BST (UTC+1) | | Report | Chambers (red card) 87' | Attendance: 19,640; Referee: Phil Crossley |

| 15 August 2009 2 | Newcastle United | 3–0 | Reading | St James' Park |
| 17:20 BST (UTC+1) | Ameobi 38', 66', 75' (pen.) | Report | | Attendance: 36,944; Referee: Anthony Taylor |

| 18 August 2009 3 | Swansea City | 0–0 | Reading | Liberty Stadium |
| 19:45 BST (UTC+1) | | Report | | Attendance: 12,775; Referee: Simon Hooper |

| 22 August 2009 4 | Reading | 1–3 | Sheffield United | Madejski Stadium |
| 15:00 BST (UTC+1) | Mills 13' | Report | Quinn 42'; Ward 62'; Cotterill 90+1' | Attendance: 16,025; Referee: Mick Russell |

| 29 August 2009 5 | Barnsley | 1–3 | Reading | Oakwell |
| 15:00 BST (UTC+1) | Gray 11' | Report | Pearce 29'; Hunt 53' (pen.), 54' | Attendance: 11,116; Referee: Michael Oliver |

| 8 September 2009 6 | Reading | 0–0 | Doncaster Rovers | Madejski Stadium |
| 15:00 BST (UTC+1) | | [Report] | | Attendance: 15,697; Referee: Phil Gibbs |

| 16 September 2009 7 | Reading | 0–1 | Cardiff City | Madejski Stadium |
| 20:00 BST (UTC+1) | | Report | Burke 58'; McPhail (red card) 75' | Attendance: 16,687; Referee: Paul Taylor |

| 19 September 2009 8 | Peterborough United | 3–2 | Reading | London Road Stadium |
| 15:00 BST (UTC+1) | Mackail-Smith 48'; McLean 54'; Boyd 90+1' | Report | Sigurðsson 30'; Church 42' | Attendance: 8,521; Referee: Chris Sarginson |

| 26 September 2009 9 | Reading | 1–1 | Watford | Madejski Stadium |
| 15:00 BST (UTC+1) | Rasiak 7' | Report | Graham 66'; Ellington (yellow card) 67' (yellow-red card) 80' | Attendance: 18,147; Referee: Mark Haywood |

| 29 September 2009 10 | Preston North End | 1–2 | Reading | Deepdale |
| 19:45 BST (UTC+1) | Parkin 85' (pen.) | Report | Church 33'; Kébé 42' | Attendance: 10,987; Referee: Andy Penn |

| 3 October 2009 11 | Reading | 0–2 | Middlesbrough | Madejski Stadium |
| 15:00 BST (UTC+1) | | Report | St Ledger 12'; Lita 55' | Attendance: 17,638; Referee: Neil Swarbrick |

| 17 October 2009 12 | West Bromwich Albion | 3–1 | Reading | The Hawthorns |
| 15:00 BST (UTC+1) | Thomas 28', 65'; Mulumbu 87' | Report | Mills 6' | Attendance: 20,935; Referee: Anthony Taylor |

| 20 October 2009 13 | Queens Park Rangers | 4–1 | Reading | Loftus Road |
| 15:00 BST (UTC+1) | Watson (yellow card) 19' (yellow-red card) 30'; Akos Buzsaky 31'; Simpson 39'; Vine 71'; Agyemang 83' | Report | Ingimarsson (yellow card) 38' (yellow-red card) 46'; Howard 86' | Attendance: 11,400; Referee: Andy Hall |

| 26 October 2009 14 | Reading | 0–1 | Leicester City | Madejski Stadium |
| 20:00 BST (UTC+1) | | Report | Waghorn 45' | Attendance: 16,192; Referee: Keith Hill |

| 31 October 2009 15 | Coventry City | 1–3 | Reading | Ricoh Arena |
| 15:00 GMT | Eastwood 64' | Report | Rasiak 1', 72'; McAnuff 54' | Attendance: 15,165; Referee: Eddie Ilderton |

| 7 November 2009 16 | Reading | 1–1 | Ipswich Town | Madejski Stadium |
| 15:00 GMT | Church 47' | Report | Stead 9' | Attendance: 19,053; Referee: Dean Whitestone |

| 21 November 2009 17 | Reading | 2–1 | Blackpool | Madejski Stadium |
| 15:00 GMT | Sigurðsson 52'; Rasiak 83' | Report | Ormerod 58' | Attendance: 15,945; Referee: Graham Scott |

| 28 November 2009 18 | Derby County | 2–1 | Reading | Pride Park Stadium |
| 15:00 GMT | Green; Hulse 73' | Report | Sigurðsson 56' | Attendance: 30,174; Referee: Andy Haines |

| 5 December 2009 19 | Sheffield Wednesday | 0–2 | Reading | Hillsborough Stadium |
| 15:00 GMT | | Report | Rasiak 48'; Cissé 66' | Attendance: 22,090; Referee: David Webb |

| 8 December 2009 20 | Reading | 2–4 | Crystal Palace | Madejski Stadium |
| 20:00 GMT | Pearce 31'; Sigurðsson 80' (pen.) | Report | Clyne 7'; Ambrose 45+1'; Moses 45+2', 88' | Attendance: 16,629; Referee: Kevin Friend |

| 12 December 2009 21 | Reading | 1–1 | Scunthorpe United | Madejski Stadium |
| 15:00 GMT | Rasiak 16' | Report | Hooper 80' | Attendance: 15,274; Referee: Andy Bates |

| 19 December 2009 22 | Bristol City | 1–1 | Reading | Ashton Gate |
| 15:00 GMT | Hartley 13' (pen.) | Report | Church 90+1'; Church (yellow card) 13' (yellow-red card) 90+2' | Attendance: 14,366; Referee: Mark Haywood |

| 26 December 2009 23 | Reading | 1–1 | Swansea City | Madejski Stadium |
| 15:00 GMT | Sigurðsson 45' | Report | Pratley 36' | Attendance: 19,608; Referee: M Russell |

| 30 December 2009 24 | Plymouth Argyle | 4–1 | Reading | Home Park |
| 15:00 GMT | Judge 13' (pen.), 63'; Arnason 59'; Barnes 84' | Report | Sigurðsson 62' | Attendance: 12,091; Referee: Simon Hooper |

| 16 January 2010 25 | Nottingham Forest | 2–1 | Reading | City Ground |
| 15:00 GMT | Anderson 11'; Earnshaw 41'; Shorey (red card) 68' | Report | Kebe 90+4' | Attendance: 27,635; Referee: Darren Deadman |

| 26 January 2010 26 | Sheffield United | 3–0 | Reading | Bramall Lane |
| 20:00 GMT | Fortune 12'; Cresswell 42'; Morgan 80' | Report | | Attendance: 24,009; Referee: Phil Crossley |

| 30 January 2010 27 | Reading | 1–0 | Barnsley | Madejski Stadium |
| 15:00 GMT | Long 29' | Report | | Attendance: 15,580; Referee: James Linnington |

| 6 February 2010 28 | Doncaster Rovers | 1–2 | Reading | Keepmoat Stadium |
| 17:15 GMT | Sharp 81' (pen.) | Report | Long 38'; Howard 77'; Mills (red card) 80' | Attendance: 8,827; Referee: Keith Stroud |

| 9 February 2010 29 | Reading | 2–1 | Plymouth Argyle | Madejski Stadium |
| 20:00 GMT | Long 51', 90+4' (pen.) | Report | Fletcher 68' | Attendance: 15,484; Referee: Oliver Langford |

| 17 February 2010 30 | Crystal Palace | 1–3 | Reading | Selhurst Park |
| 19:45 GMT | Scannell 55' | Report | Church 23', 81'; Kébé 47' | Attendance: 13,259; Referee: Dean Whitestone |

| 20 February 2010 31 | Blackpool | 2–0 | Reading | Bloomfield Road |
| 15:00 GMT | Campbell 41'; Adam 74' | Report | | Attendance: 7,147; Referee: Craig Pawson |

| 27 February 2010 32 | Reading | 5–0 | Sheffield Wednesday | Madejski Stadium |
| 15:00 GMT | Kebe 42', 71'; Rasiak 45+1', 65'; Church 52' | Report | | Attendance: 17,573; Referee: Graham Hegley |

| 10 March 2010 33 | Reading | 4–1 | Derby County | Madejski Stadium |
| 20:00 GMT | Long 8'; Kébé 35'; Bertrand 69'; Church 84' | Report | Sunu 21'; Deeney (red card) 41' | Attendance: 14,096; Referee: K Wright |

| 13 March 2010 34 | Reading | 2–0 | Bristol City | Madejski Stadium |
| 15:00 GMT | Sigurðsson 12', 22' (pen.) | Report | | Attendance: 17,900; Referee: Paul Taylor |

| 16 March 2010 35 | Reading | 1–0 | Queens Park Rangers | Madejski Stadium |
| 20:00 GMT | Sigurðsson 85' (pen.) | Report | Stewart (yellow card) 32' (yellow-red card) 44' | Attendance: 16,886; Referee: Gavin Ward |

| 20 March 2010 36 | Middlesbrough | 1–1 | Reading | Riverside Stadium |
| 15:00 GMT | Killen 47' | Report | Wheater 63' (o.g.) | Attendance: 17,082; Referee: A Hall |

| 24 March 2010 37 | Leicester City | 1–2 | Reading | Walkers Stadium |
| 19:45 GMT | Waghorn 40' | Report | Kébé 16'; Sigurðsson 90+2' (pen.) | Attendance: 20,108; Referee: D Foster |

| 27 March 2010 38 | Reading | 1–1 | West Bromwich Albion | Madejski Stadium |
| 15:00 GMT | Sigurðsson 6' | Report | Tamas 84' | Attendance: 20,515; Referee: Andy D'Urso |

| 3 April 2010 39 | Ipswich Town | 2–1 | Reading | Portman Road |
| 15:00 BST (UTC+1) | McAuley 41'; Walters 45' | Report | Mills (red card) 30'; Sigurðsson 90' | Attendance: 21,403; Referee: Keith Stroud |

| 5 April 2010 40 | Reading | 3–0 | Coventry City | Madejski Stadium |
| 15:00 BST (UTC+1) | Rasiak 15'; Church 22' (pen.); Kébé 40' | Report | | Attendance: 17,435; Referee: A Woolmer |

| 10 April 2010 41 | Cardiff City | 0–0 | Reading | Cardiff City Stadium |
| 15:00 BST (UTC+1) | | Report | | Attendance: 21,248; Referee: A Bates |

| 13 April 2010 42 | Reading | 1–2 | Newcastle United | Madejski Stadium |
| 20:00 BST (UTC+1) | Simpson 72' (o.g.) | Report | Nolan 20', 42' | Attendance: 23,163; Referee: F Graham |

| 17 April 2010 43 | Reading | 6–0 | Peterborough United | Madejski Stadium |
| 15:00 BST (UTC+1) | Pearce 3'; Sigurðsson 25' (pen.), 76'; McAnuff 29'; Kébé 44'; Long 59' | Report | | Attendance: 15,982; Referee: C Boyeson |

| 20 April 2010 44 | Scunthorpe United | 2–2 | Reading | Glanford Park |
| 19:45 BST (UTC+1) | Hooper 82'; Sparrow 89' | Report | Pearce 48'; Sigurðsson 72' (pen.) | Attendance: 5,299; Referee: G Salisbury |

| 24 April 2010 45 | Watford | 3–0 | Reading | Vicarage Road |
| 15:00 BST (UTC+1) | Graham 30', 55'; Helguson 47' | Report | | Attendance: 15,949; Referee: Kevin Friend |

| 2 May 2010 46 | Reading | 4–1 | Preston North End | Madejski Stadium |
| 13:00 BST (UTC+1) | Kébé 12'; McAnuff 17'; Sigurðsson 72'; Church 90+3' | Report | Wallace 64' | Attendance: 19,239 |

==== League table ====
| Pos | Team | Pld | W | D | L | GF | GA | GD | Pts |
|---|---|---|---|---|---|---|---|---|---|
| 7 | Swansea City | 46 | 17 | 18 | 11 | 40 | 37 | +3 | 69 |
| 8 | Sheffield United | 46 | 17 | 14 | 15 | 62 | 55 | +7 | 65 |
| 9 | Reading | 46 | 17 | 12 | 17 | 68 | 63 | +5 | 63 |
| 10 | Bristol City | 46 | 15 | 18 | 13 | 56 | 65 | −9 | 63 |
| 11 | Middlesbrough | 46 | 16 | 14 | 16 | 58 | 50 | +8 | 62 |

Source: The Football League
Rules for classification: 1) points; 2) goal difference; 3) number of goals scored.

=== FA Cup ===
| 2 January 2010 Third round | Reading | 1–1 | Liverpool | Madejski Stadium |
| 17:15 GMT | Church 24' | Report | Gerrard 36' | Attendance: 23,656; Referee: Martin Atkinson |

| 13 January 2010 Third round replay | Liverpool | 1–2 (a.e.t.) | Reading | Anfield |
| 19:45 GMT | Bertrand 45+1' (o.g.) | Report | Sigurðsson 90+4' (pen.); Long 100' | Attendance: 31,063; Referee: Phil Dowd |

| 23 January 2010 Fourth round | Reading | 1–0 | Burnley | Madejski Stadium |
| 12:45 GMT | Sigurðsson 87' | Report | | Attendance: 12,910; Referee: Andy D'Urso |

| 13 February 2010 Fifth round | Reading | 2–2 | West Bromwich Albion | Madejski Stadium |
| 15:00 GMT | Kebe 1'; Long (red card) 48'; Church 73' | Report | Koren 18'; Mulumbu (yellow card) 46' (yellow-red card) 61'; Mattock 87' | Attendance: 18,008; Referee: Chris Foy |

| 24 February 2010 Fifth round replay | West Bromwich Albion | 2–3 (a.e.t.) | Reading | The Hawthorns |
| 12:45 GMT | Koren 6', 47' | Report | Kebe 9'; Howard 90+3'; Sigurðsson 95'; McAnuff (red card) 120'^{1} | Attendance: 13,985; Referee: Lee Mason |

| 7 March 2010 Sixth round | Reading | 2–4 | Aston Villa | Madejski Stadium |
| 13:45 GMT | Long 27', 42' | Report | Young 47'; Carew 51', 55', 90' (pen.) | Attendance: 23,175; Referee: Mike Dean |

Notes

- Jobi McAnuff was sent off for violent conduct after the final whistle.

=== Football League Cup ===
| 11 August 2009 First round | Reading | 5–1 | Burton Albion | Madejski Stadium |
| 20:00 BST (UTC+1) | Mooney 6', 77'; Bignall 7', 9'; Sigurðsson 27' | Report | Phillips 59' | Attendance: 5,893; Referee: Gavin Ward |

| 25 August 2009 Second round | Reading | 1–2 | Barnsley | Madejski Stadium |
| 20:00 BST (UTC+1) | Kozluk 89' (o.g.) | Report | Bogdanović 56', 90' (pen.) | Attendance: 5,576; Referee: Graham Horwood |

== Player details ==
=== Appearances and goals ===
As of match played 2 May 2010

| No. | Pos | Nat | Player | Total | | Championship | | FA Cup | | League Cup | |
| No. | Pos | Nat | Player | Apps | Goals | Apps | Goals | Apps | Goals | Apps | Goals |
|---|---|---|---|---|---|---|---|---|---|---|---|
| 1 | GK | (Australia) AUS | Adam Federici | 52 | 0 | 46 | 0 | 6 | 0 | 0 | 0 |
| 3 | DF | (England) ENG | Chris Armstrong | 1 | 0 | 0 | 0 | 0 | 0 | 1 | 0 |
| 4 | MF | (Mali) MLI | Kalifa Cissé | 19 | 1 | 14+3 | 1 | 2 | 0 | 0 | 0 |
| 5 | DF | (England) ENG | Matt Mills | 30 | 2 | 22+1 | 2 | 6 | 0 | 1 | 0 |
| 6 | MF | (Iceland) ISL | Brynjar Gunnarsson | 32 | 0 | 18+8 | 0 | 4+1 | 0 | 1 | 0 |
| 7 | MF | (Republic of Ireland) IRL | Jay Tabb | 32 | 0 | 27+1 | 0 | 2+1 | 0 | 0+1 | 0 |
| 8 | MF | (Czech Republic) CZE | Marek Matějovský | 17 | 0 | 13+2 | 0 | 0 | 0 | 2 | 0 |
| 9 | FW | (Republic of Ireland) IRL | Shane Long | 36 | 9 | 22+9 | 6 | 2+3 | 3 | 0 | 0 |
| 10 | FW | (Republic of Ireland) IRL | Noel Hunt | 12 | 2 | 5+5 | 2 | 0 | 0 | 0+2 | 0 |
| 11 | MF | (Jamaica) JAM | Jobi McAnuff | 41 | 3 | 36 | 3 | 5 | 0 | 0 | 0 |
| 12 | FW | (Republic of Ireland) IRL | Dave Mooney | 2 | 2 | 0 | 0 | 0 | 0 | 2 | 2 |
| 14 | MF | (Mali) MLI | Jimmy Kébé | 47 | 12 | 30+12 | 10 | 3+2 | 2 | 0 | 0 |
| 16 | DF | (Iceland) ISL | Ivar Ingimarsson | 31 | 0 | 25 | 0 | 6 | 0 | 0 | 0 |
| 17 | MF | (England) ENG | James Henry | 6 | 0 | 1+2 | 0 | 0+1 | 0 | 2 | 0 |
| 18 | FW | (Wales) WAL | Simon Church | 42 | 12 | 22+14 | 10 | 5+1 | 2 | 0 | 0 |
| 19 | MF | (England) ENG | Hal Robson-Kanu | 18 | 0 | 4+13 | 0 | 0+1 | 0 | 0 | 0 |
| 20 | MF | (Turkey) TUR | Jem Karacan | 31 | 0 | 19+8 | 0 | 4 | 0 | 0 | 0 |
| 21 | GK | (England) ENG | Ben Hamer | 3 | 0 | 0 | 0 | 0+1 | 0 | 2 | 0 |
| 22 | DF | (England) ENG | Julian Kelly | 1 | 0 | 0 | 0 | 0 | 0 | 1 | 0 |
| 23 | FW | (Poland) POL | Grzegorz Rasiak | 34 | 9 | 14+15 | 9 | 3+2 | 0 | 0 | 0 |
| 24 | DF | (England) ENG | Ryan Bertrand | 51 | 1 | 44 | 1 | 6 | 0 | 1 | 0 |
| 25 | MF | (Iceland) ISL | Gylfi Sigurðsson | 44 | 20 | 32+6 | 16 | 5 | 3 | 1 | 1 |
| 26 | DF | (Scotland) SCO | Alex Pearce | 28 | 4 | 24+1 | 4 | 0+1 | 0 | 2 | 0 |
| 27 | MF | (Republic of Ireland) IRL | Scott Davies | 5 | 0 | 3+1 | 0 | 0 | 0 | 1 | 0 |
| 28 | MF | (England) ENG | Michail Antonio | 2 | 0 | 0+1 | 0 | 0 | 0 | 0+1 | 0 |
| 29 | FW | (England) ENG | Nicholas Bignall | 3 | 2 | 0+1 | 0 | 0 | 0 | 2 | 2 |
| 34 | MF | (England) ENG | Brian Howard | 39 | 3 | 30+4 | 2 | 3+2 | 1 | 0 | 0 |
| 35 | DF | (England) ENG | Shaun Cummings | 8 | 0 | 8 | 0 | 0 | 0 | 0 | 0 |
| 36 | FW | (Iceland) ISL | Gunnar Heiðar Þorvaldsson | 5 | 0 | 2+2 | 0 | 0+1 | 0 | 0 | 0 |
| 40 | DF | (England) ENG | Andy Griffin | 25 | 0 | 21 | 0 | 4 | 0 | 0 | 0 |
| 44 | DF | (Georgia (country)) GEO | Zurab Khizanishvili | 15 | 0 | 12+3 | 0 | 0 | 0 | 0 | 0 |
Players who appeared for Reading but left during the season:
| 2 | DF | (England) ENG | Liam Rosenior | 6 | 0 | 5 | 0 | 0 | 0 | 1 | 0 |
| 15 | MF | (England) ENG | James Harper | 5 | 0 | 0+3 | 0 | 0 | 0 | 2 | 0 |
| 48 | DF | (Republic of Ireland) IRL | Darren O'Dea | 8 | 0 | 7+1 | 0 | 0 | 0 | 0 | 0 |

=== Top scorers ===
As of match played 2 May 2010

| Place | Position | Nation | Number | Name | Championship | FA Cup | League Cup | Total |
|---|---|---|---|---|---|---|---|---|
| 1 | MF | (Iceland) | 25 | Gylfi Sigurðsson | 16 | 3 | 1 | 20 |
| 2 | FW | (Wales) | 18 | Simon Church | 10 | 2 | 0 | 12 |
| 2 | MF | (Mali) | 14 | Jimmy Kébé | 10 | 2 | 0 | 12 |
| 4 | FW | (Republic of Ireland) | 9 | Shane Long | 6 | 3 | 0 | 9 |
| 4 | FW | (Poland) | 23 | Grzegorz Rasiak | 9 | 0 | 0 | 9 |
| 6 | DF | (Scotland) | 26 | Alex Pearce | 4 | 0 | 0 | 4 |
| 7 | MF | (England) | 34 | Brian Howard | 2 | 1 | 0 | 3 |
| 7 | MF | (Jamaica) | 11 | Jobi McAnuff | 3 | 0 | 0 | 3 |
| 7 | | | | Own goal | 2 | 0 | 1 | 3 |
| 9 | FW | (England) | 29 | Nicholas Bignall | 0 | 0 | 2 | 2 |
| 9 | FW | (Republic of Ireland) | 10 | Noel Hunt | 2 | 0 | 0 | 2 |
| 9 | DF | (England) | 5 | Matt Mills | 2 | 0 | 0 | 2 |
| 9 | FW | (Republic of Ireland) | 12 | David Mooney | 0 | 0 | 2 | 2 |
| 13 | DF | (England) | 24 | Ryan Bertrand | 1 | 0 | 0 | 1 |
| 13 | MF | (Mali) | 4 | Kalifa Cissé | 1 | 0 | 0 | 1 |
| Total | | | | | 68 | 11 | 6 | 85 |

=== Disciplinary record ===
| Number | Nation | Position | Name | Championship | | FA Cup | | League Cup | | Total | |
| Number | Nation | Position | Name | Booked | Sent off (straight red) | Booked | Sent off (straight red) | Booked | Sent off (straight red) | Booked | Sent off (straight red) |
| 4 | (Mali) | MF | Kalifa Cissé | 2 | 0 | 0 | 0 | 0 | 0 | 2 | 0 |
| 5 | (England) | DF | Matt Mills | 6 | 2 | 3 | 0 | 0 | 0 | 9 | 2 |
| 6 | (Iceland) | MF | Brynjar Gunnarsson | 4 | 0 | 1 | 0 | 0 | 0 | 5 | 0 |
| 7 | (Republic of Ireland) | MF | Jay Tabb | 0 | 0 | 2 | 0 | 0 | 0 | 2 | 0 |
| 8 | (Czech Republic) | MF | Marek Matejovsky | 2 | 0 | 0 | 0 | 0 | 0 | 2 | 0 |
| 9 | (Republic of Ireland) | FW | Shane Long | 0 | 1 | 0 | 1 | 0 | 0 | 0 | 2 |
| 11 | (Jamaica) | MF | Jobi McAnuff | 3 | 0 | 0 | 1 | 0 | 0 | 3 | 1 |
| 14 | (Mali) | MF | Jimmy Kébé | 3 | 0 | 1 | 0 | 0 | 0 | 4 | 0 |
| 16 | (Iceland) | DF | Ivar Ingimarsson | 4 | 0 | 1 | 0 | 0 | 0 | 5 | 1 |
| 18 | (Wales) | FW | Simon Church | 1 | 0 | 0 | 0 | 0 | 0 | 1 | 0 |
| 19 | (England) | MF | Hal Robson-Kanu | 2 | 0 | 0 | 0 | 0 | 0 | 2 | 0 |
| 20 | (Turkey) | MF | Jem Karacan | 1 | 0 | 1 | 0 | 0 | 0 | 2 | 0 |
| 23 | (Poland) | FW | Grzegorz Rasiak | 2 | 0 | 0 | 0 | 0 | 0 | 2 | 0 |
| 24 | (England) | DF | Ryan Bertrand | 6 | 0 | 0 | 0 | 0 | 0 | 6 | 0 |
| 25 | (Iceland) | MF | Gylfi Sigurðsson | 4 | 0 | 1 | 0 | 0 | 0 | 5 | 0 |
| 26 | (Scotland) | DF | Alex Pearce | 7 | 0 | 0 | 0 | 1 | 0 | 8 | 0 |
| 34 | (England) | MF | Brian Howard | 5 | 0 | 1 | 0 | 0 | 0 | 6 | 0 |
| 40 | (England) | DF | Andy Griffin | 6 | 0 | 0 | 0 | 0 | 0 | 6 | 0 |
| 44 | (Georgia (country)) | DF | Zurab Khizanishvili | 2 | 0 | 0 | 0 | 0 | 0 | 2 | 0 |
| | | | TOTALS | 60 | 3 | 11 | 2 | 1 | 0 | 72 | 5 |

== Team kit ==
The 2009–10 Reading F.C. kits.

Supplier: Puma
Sponsor(s): Waitrose

| Home colours | Away colours | Third colours |
