= NABE =

NABE may refer to:

- National Association for Bilingual Education
- National Association for Business Economics
- Nabe or nabemono, Japanese steamboat dishes
