= NAB =

Nab or NAB may refer to:

- The Nab, a fell in the English Lake District
- Nab Tower, a lighthouse in England
- Mazraat Nab, now the Israeli settlement and religious moshav Nov, Golan Heights
- N.A.B. SC, a soccer club in Adelaide, Australia

== Abbreviations ==
- Name and address book
- National Accountability Bureau, an agency of the Pakistani government responsible for investigating corruption
- National Archives of Bangladesh
- National Assessment Bank, an internal exam used by the Scottish Qualifications Authority
- National Association of Broadcasters, the industry group representing the commercial radio stations and television stations of the United States
  - NAB Show, an annual trade show produced by the group
- National Australia Bank, one of Australia's biggest financial institutions and one of the world's top 30 financial services companies
- Needle aspiration biopsy, a medical technique
- Neodymium aluminium borate
- Nerf Arena Blast, a computer game
- New American Bible, a Catholic English Bible translation produced by the Confraternity of Christian Doctrine
- Nickel-aluminum bronze
- North American Bancard
- North Australian Basin

== See also ==
- McNab (disambiguation)
- Banjo-Kazooie: Nuts and Bolts
