= Neodymium aluminium borate =

Names
- IUPAC name Neodymium aluminium borate
- Other names NAB

Identifiers
3D model (JSmol)	Interactive image
ChemSpider	24751751
PubChem CID	71308245
CompTox Dashboard (EPA)	DTXSID401027033
- InChI: InChI=1S/3Al.4BO3.Nd/c;;;4*2-1(3)4;/q3*+3;4*-3;+3 Key: SHACWCBKHOKZKU-UHFFFAOYSA-N; InChI=1/3Al.4BO3.Nd/c;;;4*2-1(3)4;/q3*+3;4*-3;+3 Key: SHACWCBKHOKZKU-UHFFFAOYAF
- SMILES: B([O-])([O-])[O-].B([O-])([O-])[O-].B([O-])([O-])[O-].B([O-])([O-])[O-].[Al+3].[Al+3].[Al+3].[Nd+3]

Properties
Chemical formula	NdAl_{3}(BO_{3})_{4}
Molar mass	460.42 g/mol
- Except where otherwise noted, data are given for materials in their standard state (at 25 °C [77 °F], 100 kPa). verify (what is ?) Infobox references

Neodymium aluminium borate is a chemical compound with the chemical formula NdAl_{3}(BO_{3})_{4}.

== Uses ==
It is used in optics and is known for its role in microchip laser crystals.
