= Naby Damba =

Bissau-Guinean footballer

Personal information
- Date of birth: 1 March 1993 (age 33)
- Place of birth: Guinea-Bissau
- Position: Forward

Team information
- Current team: Sarreguemines

Senior career*
Years	Team	Apps	(Gls)
2011–2012	Séwé		
2012–2013	CA Bastia		
2013–2015	CA Bastia	9	(0)
2015–2018	Raon-l'Étape	41	(7)
2018–2020	Għajnsielem		
2020–2024	Schiltigheim	6	(0)
2024–	Sarreguemines	3	(0)
- * Club domestic league appearances and goals as of 23 November 2024

Naby Damba (born 1 March 1993) is a Bissau-Guinean professional footballer who plays as a forward for French Championnat National 3 club Sarreguemines.

== Career ==
Born in Guinea-Bissau, Damba began his footballing career with Sewe Sports of the Ivorian League. Afterwards, he signed for the CA Bastia reserve team and earned promotion to the first team in 2013, making six appearances in the 2013–14 Ligue 2, with three more the following season, before transferring to US Raon-l'Étape in 2015 along with defender Adnane Sahrane. At first, the forward intended to stay at CA Bastia but this was implausible because he did not have an agent at the time.

He has trialed for a club in Italy.
