= Naby Twimumu =

Luxembourgish footballer

Personal information
- Date of birth: 24 August 1990 (age 36)
- Place of birth: Kinshasa, Zaire
- Position: Centre forward

Senior career*
Years	Team	Apps	(Gls)
2007–2008	Jeunesse Arlonaise	0	(0)
2008–2011	FC Swift Hesperange	37	(2)
2011–2012	CS Muhlenbach		
2012–2015	FC Mamer 32		
2015–2016	US Moutfort-Medingen		
2016–2019	US Sandweiler		
2019–2020	FC Lorentzweiler		
2020–2021	AS ALSS Luxembourg		
2021–2022	SC Bettembourg		
2022–2024	FC Schengen		
2024–2025	Munsbach		

International career
2008	Luxembourg	1	(0)
- * Club domestic league appearances and goals

Naby Twimumu (born 24 August 1990) is a Luxembourgish former footballer who played as a centre forward.

== Career ==
Born in Kinshasa, Twimumu played club football in Belgium and Luxembourg for Jeunesse Arlonaise, FC Swift Hesperange, CS Muhlenbach, FC Mamer 32, US Moutfort-Medingen, US Sandweiler, FC Lorentzweiler, AS ALSS Luxembourg and SC Bettembourg.

He earned one international cap for Luxembourg in 2008.
