= Simon Church =

Wales international footballer (born 1988)

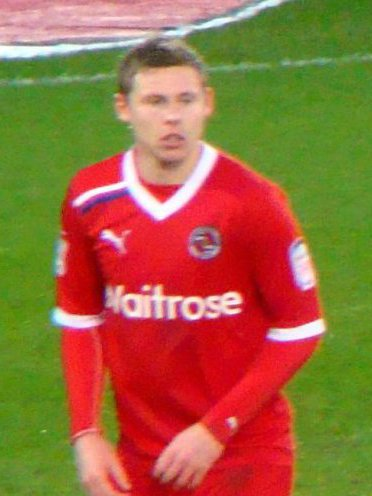
- Church playing for Reading in 2012

Personal information
- Full name: Simon Richard Church
- Date of birth: 10 December 1988 (age 37)
- Place of birth: Amersham, England
- Height: 6 ft 0 in (1.83 m)
- Position: Striker

Youth career
- 1998–2003: Wycombe Wanderers
- 2003–2007: Reading

Senior career*
Years	Team	Apps	(Gls)
2007–2013	Reading	104	(22)
2007–2008	→ Crewe Alexandra (loan)	12	(1)
2008	→ Yeovil Town (loan)	6	(0)
2008	→ Wycombe Wanderers (loan)	9	(0)
2009	→ Leyton Orient (loan)	13	(4)
2012	→ Huddersfield Town (loan)	7	(1)
2013–2015	Charlton Athletic	55	(5)
2015–2016	Milton Keynes Dons	19	(2)
2016	→ Aberdeen (loan)	13	(6)
2016–2017	Roda JC Kerkrade	4	(0)
2017–2018	Scunthorpe United	4	(0)
2018	Plymouth Argyle	2	(0)
Total		248	(41)

International career
2007–2010	Wales U21	15	(8)
2009–2016	Wales	38	(3)
Medal record
Men's football
Representing Wales
UEFA European Championship
Bronze medal – third place	2016 France
- * Club domestic league appearances and goals

Simon Richard Church (born 10 December 1988) is a retired footballer who last played as a striker for Football League One side Plymouth Argyle.

He spent ten years at Reading after signing for their academy as a teenager. In six years as a professional, he scored 22 goals in 104 league appearances before moving to Charlton Athletic, MK Dons and finally Roda JC Kerkrade. He has also had several loan spells, including six goals in 13 games for Aberdeen.

Church represented the Wales national team at international level. He was capped 38 times, including two appearances at UEFA Euro 2016 where Wales reached the semi-final for the first time in the team's history.

== Career ==
=== Reading ===
Born in Amersham, Buckinghamshire, Church was spotted as a youngster while playing at a youth tournament and joined hometown club Wycombe Wanderers Centre of Excellence as a nine-year-old upon recommendation from the club scout. Five years later, he joined Reading's Youth Academy at the age of 14, as part of the Nathan Tyson sale to Wycombe. He was a regular in Reading's reserve side whilst still in the academy. On 6 July 2007, he signed a one-year professional contract with Reading, but did not make a first team appearance that season due to stiff competition from the likes of Dave Kitson and Irish internationals Kevin Doyle and Shane Long.

==== Loan moves ====
Church joined Crewe Alexandra on loan for one month on 19 October 2007, which was subsequently extended to 19 January 2008 following rave reviews. He was put into the starting XI for Crewe on 20 October 2007 against Luton Town, where he wore the number 31 shirt and assisted Ryan Lowe for Crewe Alexandra's second goal. He scored his first goal for Crewe in a 2–2 draw with Cheltenham on 27 October 2007.

Church joined Yeovil Town on loan for the remainder of the 2007–08 season on 29 January 2008. He followed this with a loan move to his hometown club Wycombe Wanderers at the start of the 2008–09 season. His original month at the club was cut short due to a sending off and subsequent three match ban, but he later rejoined the club for a further two months on 20 October 2008.

On 17 February 2009 Church joined Leyton Orient, initially on a month's loan, but later extended to the end of the season.

==== First-team breakthrough ====
Church made his full first team debut for Reading in the play-off semi-final second leg defeat to Burnley on 12 May 2009. With the departures of Doyle and Kitson, he became more of a regular in the first team and soon claimed a starting place at the expense of Long. On 19 September, he scored his first league goal in only his fourth start in a 3–2 defeat to Peterborough United and dedicated it to his father who died earlier that month. On 2 January 2010, he scored against Premiership side Liverpool in the FA Cup third round as the Royals took a shock lead and held the Merseyside club to a 1–1 draw at the Madejski Stadium. The Royals went on to win 2–1 in the replay. Four days later, he was offered a new deal and extended his contract until 2013. In February, he scored a brace against Crystal Palace in a 3–1 win, which lifted Reading out of the relegation zone.

Midway through the 2011–12 season, Church hit form with four goals in four matches, opening the scoring against Peterborough, getting a brace against promotion contenders West Ham and earning a 0–1 win away at Leeds United with a well taken lob over Andrew Lonergan. At the end of the 2012–13 season, Church was released by the club.

=== Huddersfield Town ===
On 8 November 2012, Church joined Huddersfield Town on a one-month loan deal and made his Town debut two days later in Huddersfield's 1–0 win away at Oakwell, over Barnsley. Church scored his first goal for Huddersfield Town in the 90th minute of his second game for them, a 1–2 defeat at home to Brighton & Hove Albion. Church returned to Reading after their game with Sheffield Wednesday game on 29 December, having made a total of seven appearances for Huddersfield.

=== Charlton Athletic ===
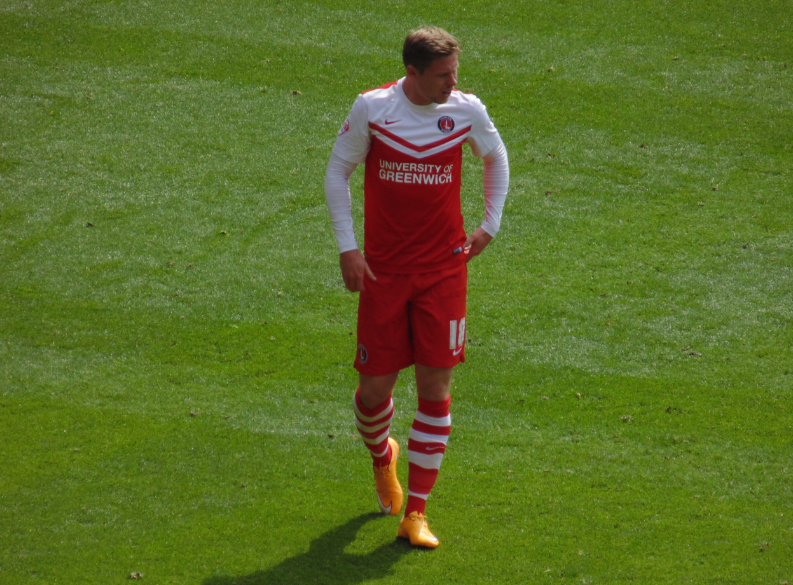
Church playing for Charlton Athletic in 2015

On 1 August 2013 Church joined Charlton Athletic on a two-year contract and was handed the number 9 shirt. He scored his first goals for the club in the League Cup against Oxford United five days later in a 4–0 home win for Charlton.

On 12 May 2015, Church was released at the end of his contract.

=== Milton Keynes Dons ===
On 30 June 2015, Church signed for newly promoted Championship side Milton Keynes Dons on a two-year contract. Church scored his first goal for the MK Dons in a 2–1 defeat to Leeds United.

==== Aberdeen (loan) ====
On 1 February 2016, after finding limited first team opportunities, Church signed for Scottish Premiership side Aberdeen on loan for the remainder of the 2015–16 season. He scored on his debut in Aberdeen's 2–1 win over Celtic on 3 February 2016.

=== Roda JC Kerkrade ===
On 24 August 2016, Church joined Dutch Eredivisie side Roda JC Kerkrade on a one-year deal for an undisclosed fee.

=== Scunthorpe United ===
On 21 October 2017, Church joined English side Scunthorpe United on a short-term deal until January 2018, with the club confirming his departure on 15 January 2018

=== Plymouth Argyle ===
He signed for Plymouth Argyle later that month. A hip injury meant he was only able to make two appearances before being ruled out for the rest of the season. Church retired from professional football in May 2018.

== International career ==
Born and brought up in England, Church qualifies to play for Wales through grandparents from Newport. He made his début for the Wales U21 team as a substitute in their 4–3 win over Sweden U21 on 21 August 2007. On 10 October 2007, he scored twice as Wales U-21 lost 3–2 to England in the first leg of their European Championship qualifying match. Church scored a brace for Wales under 21s against England under 21s as they lost 3–2 on 10 October 2008, in the 2009 European Championship play-offs. He also scored Wales's second goal in the first half of the second leg of the play-off against England, neatly lifting the ball over the on rushing Joe Hart but they lost 5–4 on aggregate to England, thus missing out on a spot in the final tournament. In March 2009, he was named captain of the U-21s.

On 29 May 2009 Church made his debut for the senior Wales international team in the friendly against Estonia. He received call-ups for the match against Italy U21 and a 2010 World Cup qualifier against Russia on 9 September but did not participate due to the death of his father. He scored his first senior goal on 14 November in friendly against Scotland that ended 3–0. His final goal for Wales came from the penalty spot in 1–1 draw against Northern Ireland in March 2016.

== Career statistics ==
As of match played 5 May 2018.

Club	Season	League			FA Cup		League Cup		Other		Total	
Club	Season	Division	Apps	Goals	Apps	Goals	Apps	Goals	Apps	Goals	Apps	Goals
Reading	2007–08	Premier League	0	0	0	0	0	0	—		0	0
Reading	2008–09	Championship	0	0	1	0	0	0	1 (Note: Appearance(s) in the Championship play-offs)	0	2	0
Reading	2009–10	Championship	36	10	6	2	0	0	—		42	12
Reading	2010–11	Championship	37	5	4	0	1	0	2	0	44	5
Reading	2011–12	Championship	31	7	1	0	1	0	—		33	7
Reading	2012–13	Premier League	0	0	0	0	1	0	—		1	0
Reading	Total		104	22	12	2	3	0	3	0	122	24
Crewe Alexandra (loan)	2007–08	League One	12	1	2	0	0	0	0	0	14	1
Yeovil Town (loan)	2007–08	League One	6	0	0	0	0	0	0	0	6	0
Wycombe Wanderers (loan)	2008–09	League Two	9	0	0	0	0	0	0	0	9	0
Leyton Orient (loan)	2008–09	League One	13	4	0	0	0	0	0	0	13	4
Huddersfield Town (loan)	2012–13	Championship	7	1	0	0	0	0	—		7	1
Charlton Athletic	2013–14	Championship	38	3	5	2	1	2	—		44	7
Charlton Athletic	2014–15	Championship	17	2	1	0	1	1	—		19	3
Charlton Athletic	Total		55	5	6	2	2	3	—		63	10
Milton Keynes Dons	2015–16	Championship	19	2	2	1	2	0	—		23	3
Aberdeen (loan)	2015–16	Scottish Premiership	13	6	0	0	0	0	—		13	6
Roda JC Kerkrade	2016–17	Eredivisie	4	0	0	0	0	0	—		4	0
Scunthorpe United	2017–18	League One	4	0	1	0	0	0	2	0	7	0
Plymouth Argyle	2017–18	League One	2	0	0	0	0	0	0	0	2	0
Career total			248	41	23	5	7	3	5	0	283	49

== Honours ==
Reading

- Football League Championship: 2011–12
