= Mikkel Andersen (footballer) =

Danish footballer (born 1988)

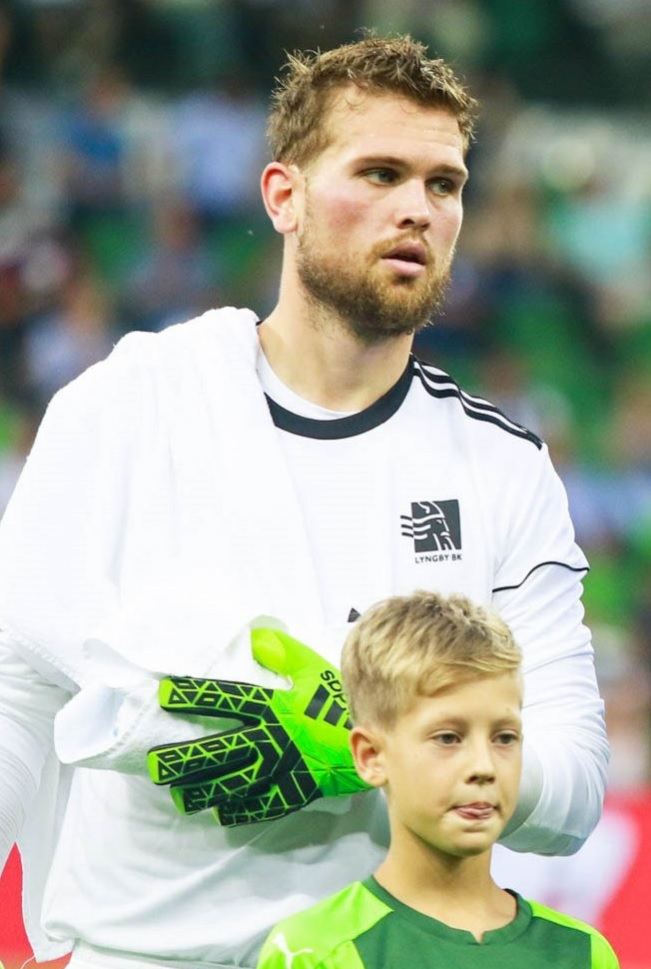
- Andersen with Lyngby in 2017

Personal information
- Full name: Mikkel Andersen
- Date of birth: 17 December 1988 (age 37)
- Place of birth: Herlev, Denmark
- Height: 6 ft 5 in (1.96 m)
- Position: Goalkeeper

Senior career*
Years	Team	Apps	(Gls)
2006–2007	AB	7	(0)
2007–2015	Reading	3	(0)
2008	→ Torquay United (loan)	3	(0)
2008	→ Rushden & Diamonds (loan)	3	(0)
2008	→ Brentford (loan)	1	(0)
2009	→ Brighton & Hove Albion (loan)	5	(0)
2009–2010	→ Bristol Rovers (loan)	39	(0)
2010–2011	→ Bristol Rovers (loan)	19	(0)
2012	→ Portsmouth (loan)	18	(0)
2013–2014	→ Randers (loan)	10	(0)
2015–2017	Midtjylland	42	(0)
2017–2018	Lyngby	25	(0)
2018–2021	Midtjylland	7	(0)
2021	Brann	0	(0)
2021–2023	Viborg	6	(0)
2023–2025	Fremad Amager	52	(0)

International career
2007	Denmark U19	2	(0)
2007	Denmark U20	1	(0)
2009–2011	Denmark U21	14	(0)

Managerial career
- 2023–2025: Fremad Amager (gk coach)
- * Club domestic league appearances and goals as of 15:40, 29 May 2025 (UTC)

Mikkel Andersen (born 17 December 1988) is a Danish professional footballer who plays as a goalkeeper.

He has appeared in 17 European matches, amongst others against Rubin Kazan, Napoli, Club Brugge, Legia Warsaw, Manchester United, Slovan Bratislava and FC Krasnodar.

== Club career ==
=== Denmark ===
Andersen began his career with Danish club AB and became the youngest goalkeeper to play in Danish senior football. He joined Reading on a two-and-a-half-year contract on 26 January 2007, having played seven times for AB.

=== Reading ===
Andersen signed a loan deal with Torquay United on 26 February 2008, making his debut the same day in a 1–1 draw at home to Altrincham.

He returned to Reading having played three times for Torquay during his one-month on loan and looked set to remain with Reading for the remainder of the season. However, he joined Rushden & Diamonds on a seven-day emergency loan on 15 April 2008, making his Rushden debut in a 2–1 win at home to Torquay. He also played in the defeats against Exeter City and Oxford United before returning to Reading.

In December 2008, he was again signed on an emergency loan, this time for Brentford, whose first-choice keeper Ben Hamer, also borrowed from Reading, was suspended. He was named MOTM and Team of the week for his performance in this one game.

On 6 March 2009, it was revealed that Andersen had joined League One side Brighton & Hove Albion on loan for one month.

On 20 September 2014, he made his full debut for the club in a 1–0 defeat away to Sheffield Wednesday.

=== Bristol Rovers (loan) ===
On 1 September 2009, deadline day, Andersen was signed on loan by Bristol Rovers until 1 January. He made his debut against Millwall which Bristol Rovers won 2–0, keeping a clean sheet.

On 20 March, Andersen played against two other on-loan Reading players Scott Davies and Alex McCarthy. He kept a clean sheet from that game which ended 3–0 to Bristol Rovers. On 5 April, he saved a penalty from Milton Keynes Dons' Jermaine Easter as Rovers won 1–0, keeping another clean sheet this penalty save was his first ever one.

Andersen played 58 League games for The Pirates. He was awarded the League One side's Young Player of the Year trophy, and was also ranked third in the overall Player of the Year poll. For his performances and awards he was named in the BBC Team of The Year as well.

Andersen finished his loan spell with Bristol Rovers on 5 January 2011.

=== Portsmouth (loan) ===
On 17 August, Andersen joined Portsmouth on loan for one month. He made his debut in an Npower League 1 game against Bournemouth, the game ended in a 1–1 draw.

=== Randers (loan) ===
On 11 June 2013, Andersen joined Danish Superliga side Randers on loan for the 2013–14 season. Andersen made his debut on 20 July 2013 against Viborg in a game that ended 2-2.

=== Midtjylland ===
On 25 June 2015, Andersen signed a two-year contract with FC Midtjylland. Andersen played all six matches in the Europa League group stage against Club Brugge, Legia Warsaw and Napoli, where FC Midtjylland finished as runners-up to qualify for the final rounds. In February 2016, Midtjylland and Andersen beat Manchester United 2–1 at MCH Arena and lost 1–5 at Old Trafford in the second leg of round of 32. In those two matches, Andersen saved a penalty from Juan Mata, and his general performances were generally lauded. In the same 2015–16 season, Andersen kept an average score of under one goal against in the Superliga, where Midtjylland finished third in the league and won bronze medals.

Andersen left the club in the summer of 2017.

=== Lyngby BK ===
Andersen signed a three-year contract with Lyngby Boldklub on 24 June 2017.

=== SK Brann ===
Andersen joined the Norwegian Eliteserien club SK Brann, in June 2021, but terminated his contract 20 August the same year, after a scandal involving him and other players partying at Brann Stadion.

=== Viborg ===
On 31 August 2021, Andersen joined newly promoted Danish Superliga club Viborg FF on a deal until June 2023. In June 2023, Andersen's departure from the club was confirmed.

=== Fremad Amager ===
On August 4, 2023, Andersen was suddenly on the team sheet and in the starting lineup when the newly relegated Danish 2nd Division club Fremad Amager met HIK in a league match. However, there had been no official announcement from the club about Andersen's move to Fremad Amager.

In March 2025 the club confirmed, that Andersen had extended his contract for the upcoming three seasons. However, on 27 May 2025—just under two months later—the club announced that the contract with Andersen, who served as both player and goalkeeping coach, had been terminated with immediate effect, without further explanation.

== International career ==
After signing for Reading, Andersen played three games for the Danish national under-19 and under-20 teams during 2007. He made his debut for the Denmark national under-21 football team in February 2009, replacing Jonas Lössl at half-time. In May 2010, he joined the under-21 team for a series of unofficial games at the international 2010 Toulon Tournament. He made four appearances as Denmark finished runners-up, and was named goalkeeper of the tournament.

He has played 14 games for the Denmark national under-21 football team. In the other 10 under-21 games, three of them were at the 2011 UEFA European Under-21 Championship.

== Career statistics ==
As of match played 29 May 2025.

Club	Season	League			National cup		League cup		Europe		Other		Total	
Club	Season	Division	Apps	Goals	Apps	Goals	Apps	Goals	Apps	Goals	Apps	Goals	Apps	Goals
Akademisk Boldklub	2006–07	Danish 1st Division	5	0	0	0	—		—		—		5	0
Reading	2007–08	Premier League	0	0	0	0	0	0	—		—		0	0
Reading	2010–11	Championship	0	0	0	0	0	0	—		—		0	0
Reading	2011–12	Championship	0	0	0	0	0	0	—		—		0	0
Reading	2012–13	Championship	0	0	0	0	0	0	—		—		0	0
Reading	2014–15	Championship	3	0	1	0	1	0	—		—		5	0
Reading	Total		3	0	1	0	1	0	—		—		5	0
Torquay United (loan)	2007–08	Conference Premier	3	0	0	0	—		—		0	0	3	0
Rushden & Diamonds (loan)	2007–08	Conference Premier	3	0	0	0	—		—		0	0	3	0
Brentford (loan)	2008–09	League Two	1	0	0	0	0	0	—		0	0	1	0
Brighton & Hove Albion (loan)	2008–09	League One	5	0	0	0	0	0	—		0	0	5	0
Bristol Rovers (loan)	2009–10	League One	39	0	0	0	0	0	—		0	0	39	0
Bristol Rovers (loan)	2010–11	League One	19	0	0	0	0	0	—		3 (Note: Appearance(s) in the Football League Trophy)	0	22	0
Bristol Rovers (loan)	Total		58	0	0	0	0	0	—		3	0	61	0
Portsmouth (loan)	2012–13	League One	18	0	—		—		—		1	0	19	0
Randers (loan)	2013–14	Danish Superliga	10	0	0	0	—		2	0	—		12	0
Midtjylland	2015–16	Danish Superliga	29	0	2	0	—		9	0	—		40	0
Midtjylland	2016–17	Danish Superliga	13	0	0	0	—		0	0	—		13	0
Midtjylland	Total		42	0	2	0	—		9	0	—		53	0
Lyngby	2017–18	Danish Superliga	18	0	1	0	—		6	0	4	0	29	0
Lyngby	2018–19	Danish 1st Division	3	0	0	0	—		—		—		3	0
Lyngby	Total		21	0	2	0	—		9	0	—		32	0
Midtjylland	2018–19	Danish Superliga	2	0	1	0	—		0	0	—		3	0
Midtjylland	2019–20	Danish Superliga	3	0	0	0	—		0	0	—		3	0
Midtjylland	2020–21	Danish Superliga	2	0	1	0	—		2 (Note: Appearances in UEFA Champions League)	0	—		5	0
Midtjylland	Total		7	0	2	0	—		2	0	—		11	0
Brann	2021	Eliteserien	0	0	1	0	—		—		—		1	0
Viborg	2021–22	Danish Superliga	6	0	0	0	—		—		—		6	0
Viborg	2022–23	Danish Superliga	0	0	3	0	—		0	0	—		3	0
Viborg	Total		6	0	3	0	—		0	0	—		9	0
Fremad Amager	2023–24	Danish 2nd Division	28	0	0	0	—		—		—		28	0
Fremad Amager	2024–25	Danish 2nd Division	24	0	0	0	—		—		—		24	0
Fremad Amager	Total		52	0	0	0	—		—		—		52	0
Career total			234	0	9	0	0	0	19	0	8	0	270	0

== Honours ==
Individual

- Toulon Tournament Best Goalkeeper: 2010
