= 2012–13 Reading F.C. season =

Reading
2012–13 season
- Chairman: Sir John Madejski
- Manager: Brian McDermott (until 11 March 2013); Eamonn Dolan (caretaker, 11–26 March 2013); Nigel Adkins (from 26 March 2013)
- Stadium: Madejski Stadium
- Premier League: 19th (relegated)
- FA Cup: Fifth round vs Manchester United
- League Cup: Fourth round vs Arsenal
- Top goalscorer: League: Adam Le Fondre (12); All: Adam Le Fondre (14)
- Highest home attendance: 24,184 vs Everton, Premier League, 17 November 2012
- Lowest home attendance: 7,262 vs Peterborough United, League Cup, 28 August 2012
- Average home league attendance: 23,862 PL; 22,697 Overall
Home colours	Away colours

The 2012–13 season was Reading Football Club's third season in the Premier League, and the first since their relegation to the Championship in 2008. Reading secured automatic promotion on 17 April 2012 following a 1–0 win against Nottingham Forest and were crowned as Championship winners four days later. They began the season in August with a 1–1 draw against Stoke City but had to wait until mid-November for their first league win, a 2–1 win over Everton on 17 November 2012. A run of four wins in six around January saw Brian McDermott and Adam Le Fondre named Manager of the Month and Player of the Month respectively, though one month later, after defeats by relegation rivals Wigan Athletic and Aston Villa, McDermott was sacked as the club's manager. He was replaced by Nigel Adkins on 26 March, ending Eamonn Dolan's two-week stint as caretaker manager. On 28 April, following a 0–0 home draw against Queens Park Rangers, Reading were relegated to the Championship for the 2013–14 season. They finished the season with six wins from 38 games, the lowest number in their history.

In addition to the Premier League, the club also participated in the two domestic cup competitions. After beating Peterborough United and QPR in the second and third rounds respectively, Reading were knocked out of the League Cup in the fourth round by Arsenal after a dramatic 7–5 extra time defeat. In the FA Cup they recorded victories over Crawley Town and Sheffield United, before a close 2–1 defeat by Manchester United in the fifth round. At the end of the season Adam Le Fondre, who was Reading's top scorer with 14 goals, was named the club's Player of the Season.

== Promotion ==
On 17 April 2012, during the 2011–12 season, Reading required a better performance than rivals West Ham United to achieve automatic promotion from the Championship to the Premier League. On the evening, West Ham drew 1–1 with Bristol City, and Reading's Mikele Leigertwood scored an 81st-minute goal from an Ian Harte free kick against Nottingham Forest to secure promotion. Upon the final whistle, there was a pitch invasion at the Madejski Stadium.

== Season review ==
=== Pre-season ===
==== Transfers ====
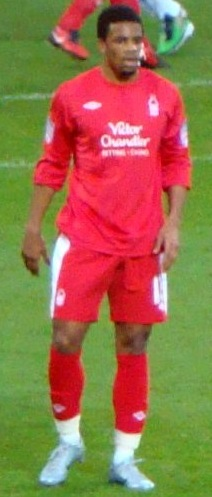
Garath McCleary who became Reading's first signing of the summer joining from Nottingham Forest in May. Pictured in 2010 playing for Forest.

On 2 May, Reading announced that they would be renewing ten players contracts whilst 13 would be released. The players leaving included Andy Griffin, Brian Howard and Tomasz Cywka, as well as a number of youngsters. Experienced duo Ian Harte and Brynjar Gunnarsson were both handed one-year extensions along with several young professionals and scholars including Michael Hector and Gozie Ugwu. Reading completed their first signing of the season on 16 May with Garath McCleary signing a three-year deal on a Bosman transfer from Nottingham Forest. The club were linked with a number of players over the next six weeks before Danny Guthrie joined on a free transfer from Newcastle United, becoming Reading's second signing of the summer. The following week Pavel Pogrebnyak signed a four-year deal on a free transfer from Fulham following the approval of his work permit, and the day after, on 6 July, Irish youngster Pierce Sweeney joined for an undisclosed fee from Bray Wanderers. Nicky Shorey rejoined the club on a one-year deal on 10 July following his release from West Bromwich Albion, whilst three days later the first outgoing business of the season was completed with Mathieu Manset joining Sion on a three-year contract. On 17 July the club completed a double signing with Adrian Mariappa and Chris Gunter joining from Watford and Nottingham Forest respectively. Both signed on three-year deals for an undisclosed fee.

Several young players left the club on loan during the summer. Left back Joseph Mills became the first outgoing player, joining Burnley on a season long loan on 17 July, whilst two days later Gozie Ugwu, having just signed a new 2-year contract, was loaned to Yeovil Town until 1 January 2013. The following week Michael Hector joined League One team Shrewsbury Town until 2 January 2013 and on 30 July Angus MacDonald joined AFC Wimbledon on a six-month deal. On 4 August there were two more loan departures with Karl Sheppard joining Accrington Stanley on a six-month loan and Brett Williams joining Woking on a season long deal. Two days later Michail Antonio left the club permanently, joining Sheffield Wednesday for an undisclosed fee and on 17 August, Mikkel Andersen joined Portsmouth on a one-month loan, with Jordan Obita joining him four days later on a similar deal. Having trained with the club since mid July, Stuart Taylor signed a one-year deal on 20 August, completing Reading's summer transfer business.

==== Friendlies ====
On 14 July the senior team played their first friendly away at AFC Wimbledon in a game they won 7–0. Adam Le Fondre scored twice to give Reading a 2–0 lead at half time, during which Reading made ten changes. Michail Antonio scored five minutes into the second half, before a 15-minute hat-trick for Simon Church and a goal from Jordan Obita completed the scoring. Stuart Taylor came on for the last 30 minutes, replacing Alex McCarthy, as he continued his trial with the club. Reading then flew out to Portugal to play three friendlies, the first of which took place on 21 July against Portuguese third division side Quarteirense in Quarteira. The match finished 1–1 with a trademark Ian Harte free kick only enough for draw. Three days later they lost 0–2 to Sheffield Wednesday, the goals coming from Mike Jones and Chris O'Grady either side of half time. Reading's final game in Portugal was played on 27 July against first division side Olhanense. In a surprisingly ill-tempered game, Reading earned a 1–1 draw with Danny Guthrie scoring for the Royals in the first half before Rui Duarte scored a second half penalty. On 4 August they drew 2–2 away at AFC Bournemouth thanks to goals from Adrian Mariappa and Hal Robson-Kanu before they travelled Brighton & Hove Albion for the Michael Kuipers testimonial three days later. Reading went 1–0 down to a Vicente penalty in the first half, before an 89th-minute equaliser from Robson-Kanu levelled the game. Reading's last friendly was on 11 August against Crystal Palace at the Madejski Stadium. Second half goals from Pavel Pogrebnyak and Adam Le Fondre were enough to complete a winning end to the pre-season.

In addition to the senior team, the club also fielded a Reading XI composed mainly of players from the development squad to face local non-league sides. Their first pre-season friendly was against Didcot Town on 10 July, and saw a team featuring a couple of trialists win 3–2. The Reading XI were 3–0 up at half time thanks to goals from Jordan Obita, Karl Sheppard and Ryan Edwards before Didcot scored twice in the second half. A week later the development side were in action again away to Ebbsfleet United. For the second game in a row they won 3–2 with second half goals from Jordan Obita and Brett Williams adding to Jake Taylor's first half header. On 21 July, in addition to the senior team's friendly in Portugal, the Reading XI were in action away to Basingstoke Town and suffered a heavy 5–0 defeat. Three days later they faced Boreham Wood and won 2–1 thanks to two Dominic Samuel goals before a trip to Salisbury City on 28 July where they lost 1–0. The Reading XI were soon in action again, earning a 2–1 win away at Hendon on 31 July and then a 1–0 victory over Hungerford Town on 4 August. Three days later they travelled away to Hemel Hempstead Town and earned a 1–1 draw with Jordan Obita scoring his fourth goal in seven pre-season games. The final Reading XI game saw the team came from 2–0 down to win 4–2 away against Eastleigh on 11 August. Goals from Jake Taylor, Aaron Tshibola and a double from Craig Tanner were enough to secure a seventh victory in nine games for the development squad.

=== August ===
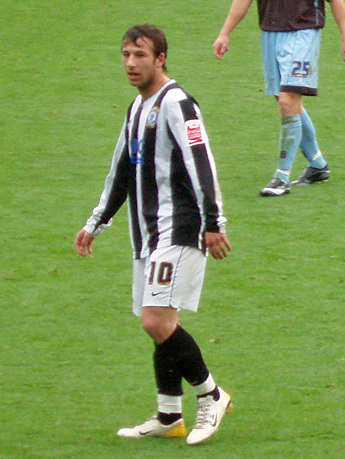
Adam Le Fondre whose last-minute penalty against Stoke earned Reading a draw on the opening day of the Premier League. Pictured in 2007, playing for Rochdale.

August began with news that Adam Federici had signed a new contract, keeping him with the club until 2015. On 15 August Reading were drawn at home to Peterborough United in the second round of the League Cup with the tie to be played on 28 August. Reading started their first season back in the Premier League with a 1–1 home draw against Stoke City on 18 August. Stoke took the lead in the first half after a mistake by Federici let Michael Kightly's shot spill into the net. In the 90th minute Dean Whitehead fouled Garath McCleary in the box, resulting in Whitehead receiving a second booking and allowing Adam Le Fondre to score the penalty and draw the game. Reading's next game against Chelsea was moved forward to 22 August from 1 September due to Chelsea's participation in the UEFA Super Cup on 31 August. Chelsea opened the scoring through a Frank Lampard penalty on 18 minutes, before a quick-fire double from Pavel Pogrebnyak and Danny Guthrie saw Reading take the lead. Gary Cahill brought things level again in the 69th minute before Fernando Torres, who was arguably in an offside position, gave Chelsea the lead again in the 81st minute. Branislav Ivanović then scored a break away goal in the 95th minute after Adam Federici was caught upfield for a last minute corner, securing a 4–2 win for Chelsea.

Reading's fixture list experienced further disruption after the away game against Sunderland on 25 August was called off an hour before kickoff due to a waterlogged pitch at the Stadium of Light. The last game in August was the League Cup tie against Peterborough United, which ended 3–2 to Reading. Peterborough took the lead in the through Paul Taylor in the 12th minute, before three goals in four minutes saw Reading equalise, through Pavel Pogrebnyak, go behind again, thanks to Lee Tomlin, and then equalise again through Chris Gunter. Nathaniel Knight-Percival's own goal in the 39th minute then edged Reading ahead, and after a goalless second half they held out to progress to the third round.

=== September ===
With the postponement of the Sunderland game, Reading faced a gap of nearly three weeks between the Peterborough United cup match and the league fixture against Tottenham Hotspur. To keep match fitness levels up the club arranged a friendly against Bray Wanderers, the club they signed defender Pierce Sweeney from during the summer, to take place on 2 September in Bray. Reading played a near full-strength side won the game emphatically 8–1 thanks to hat-tricks from Adam Le Fondre and Jay Tabb, as well as goals from Alex Pearce and Jem Karacan. Three days later the club submitted their 25-man squad for the Premier League campaign. All Reading's senior players were included except Brett Williams and Nicholas Bignall, who was recovering from a long-term injury.

The team were finally back in competitive action on 16 September at home to Tottenham Hotspur, in a game they lost 3–1. Following several costly mistakes in the first three games Adam Federici was replaced in goal by Alex McCarthy, though he was powerless to prevent Spurs going 3–0 up thanks to goals from Jermain Defoe in the first half and a quick-fire double from Gareth Bale and Defoe in the second half. Hal Robson-Kanu pulled one back for the Royals in the 90th minute but it proved to be no more than a consolation goal. On 18 September Jordan Obita and Mikkel Andersen extended their loan spells at Portsmouth for another month and the next day Jem Karacan extended his contract with the club until June 2015. The following Saturday Reading made the trip to The Hawthorns to face West Bromwich Albion and despite several good saves from McCarthy, they lost 1–0 after a 71st minute Romelu Lukaku goal. The fourth round of the League Cup saw Reading travel to Queens Park Rangers on 26 September. QPR opened the scoring through Junior Hoilett before Kaspars Gorkšs equalised 2 minutes later. Djibril Cissé then restored QPR's lead in the 71st minute only for Nicky Shorey to make it 2–2 with a free kick five minutes later, his first goal since his return to the club. Reading scored again in the 81st minute with a flick from Pavel Pogrebnyak and it proved enough to secure a 3–2 win.

Two days later Reading recalled Angus MacDonald from his loan with AFC Wimbledon having made six appearances for the League Two club and on 29 September it was reported that the club had taken Russian youngsters Sergey Kundik and Nikita Khaykin, formerly of Chelsea, on trial. On the same day, the final game of the month took place at the Madejski Stadium with Reading earning a 2–2 draw against Newcastle United. Reading twice took the lead through Jimmy Kebe and Noel Hunt but a late Demba Ba goal was enough to secure Newcastle a share of the points. Despite suspicions of handball, Ba's goal was allowed to stand and Reading entered October in 19th position and still without a win in the league.

=== October ===
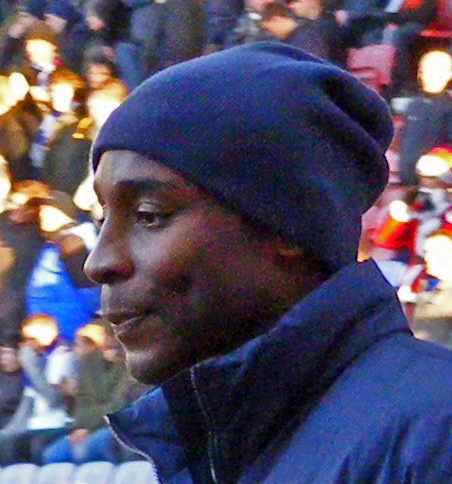
Jason Roberts caused controversy after boycotting the Kick It Out T-shirt campaign. Pictured in 2009 whilst at Blackburn Rovers.

October began with news that Sean Morrison had signed a new deal with the club, keeping him at Reading until 2016. The start of the month also saw Steve Head, a former youth team player at Elm Park, brought in as head of scouting and recruitment to expand the club's scouting network. On 6 October the team travelled to Swansea City for the first league game of the month. Goals from Pavel Pogrebnyak and Noel Hunt gave Reading a 2–0 at half time against the run of play before Swansea came back in the second half, scoring twice through Michu and Wayne Routledge to secure a 2–2 draw. Reading were outplayed for much of the game, managing just eight shots compared to Swansea's 25.

On 16 October it was revealed that Reading had taken Indian under-19 international Brandon Fernandes on a two-week trial from ASD Cape Town. Two days later Adam Le Fondre became the fourth player of the season to sign a new contract, penning a three-year deal and joining Adam Federici, Jem Karacan and Sean Morrison in committing his future to the club. The next day young defender Matt Partridge was the first player to depart during the month, joining Bognor Regis Town on a one-month loan.

Reading's next league game was against Liverpool at Anfield on 20 October with Raheem Sterling scoring the only goal as Liverpool ran out 1–0 winners. Prior to the game Jason Roberts caused controversy by refusing to wear a Kick It Out T-shirt in protest at a perceived lack of action against racism by the organisation. Roberts was joined by several other high-profile players including Rio Ferdinand and Joleon Lescott in boycotting the campaign, although his stance was criticised by others including Alex Ferguson. On the same day Jordan Obita returned early from his loan spell at Portsmouth following a family bereavement, though Mikkel Andersen's stay at Fratton Park was extended for a third, and final month. Further loan news followed with Lawson D'Ath joining League Two side Cheltenham Town on a one-month loan on 25 October. The team were back in league action two days later at home to Fulham in a game that finished 3–3. Reading took the lead in the lead in the 26th minute through Mikele Leigertwood and remained in front until the 61st minute, when Fulham substitute Bryan Ruiz equalised. The visitors then took the lead through a Chris Baird header, setting up frantic last five minutes. Garath McCleary made it 2–2 before Dimitar Berbatov again put Fulham in the lead, only for Hal Robson-Kanu to grab a 90th-minute equaliser for Reading. The draw was not enough to drag the Royals out of the bottom three, and extended their winless run in the league to nine games.

The final game of the month was the League Cup fourth round tie against Arsenal at the Madejski Stadium. In an extraordinary game, Reading lost 7–5 after extra time despite leading by four goals at one point. Reading had fired themselves into a 4–0 lead with only 37 minutes played after goals from Jason Roberts, a Laurent Koscielny own goal, Mikele Leigertwood and Noel Hunt. Theo Walcott got one back for the visitors just before half time as the visitors went into the break trailing by three goals. Olivier Giroud further reduced the deficit before Koscielny and Walcott scored in the closing minutes to make it 4–4 after 90 minutes. Marouane Chamakh gave Arsenal the lead in extra time only for substitute Pavel Pogrebnyak to again bring the scores level. Walcott then completed his hat-trick in injury time before Chamakh's second sealed the match for Arsenal. October closed with confirmation that the club would not be offering a contract to Brandon Fernandes following his two-week trial.

=== November ===
On 1 November the postponed away game against Sunderland was rearranged to be played on 11 December at 19:45. Reading's winless run in the league continued as they drew 1–1 away to fellow strugglers Queens Park Rangers on 4 November. Kaspars Gorkšs opened the scoring in the 16th minute, acrobatically firing home from close range before QPR equalised in the second half through Djibril Cissé. The game ended on a sour note for Reading though after Alex McCarthy injured his shoulder in a collision with the goalpost. The club later confirmed that he had been to see a specialist and would be out for a "little while".

On 8 November Simon Church became the first of several loan departures during the month, joining Huddersfield Town on a one-month deal. Two days later the team faced Norwich City at the Madejski Stadium in a game that ended goalless and consigned Reading to a sixth draw in ten games. The following week Reading were again at home for the visit of Everton. The visitors took the lead in the 10th minute after a series of defensive errors allowed Steven Naismith to score from close range. Everton then had several chances to extend their lead before a second half Adam Le Fondre inspired comeback gave Reading a 2–1 lead. Having headed in a Nicky Shorey free-kick to draw the scores level, Le Fondre then converted a late penalty and Reading held on to earn their first Premier League win at the eleventh attempt.

In mid-November a series of loan returns and departures were completed. Firstly, on 20 November, goalkeeper Mikkel Andersen returned from Portsmouth having made 19 appearances during his three-month stay. He was followed the next day by Michael Hector who was recalled early from Shrewsbury Town having fallen out of first team contention. Within hours of being recalled Hector was on the move again, joining Aldershot Town until January whilst Angus MacDonald joined Torquay United on a similar deal. Lawson D'Ath extended his stay at Cheltenham Town and was joined at the club by Jake Taylor with both signing until the beginning of January. The loan business was completed by Simon Church who extended his stay at Huddersfield for a further five weeks.

Reading travelled away to Wigan Athletic on 24 November for their next league fixture, with the game ending in a 3–2 defeat. Sean Morrison's first league goal for the club put them into the lead before Jordi Gómez equalised after 58 minutes. Gómez then scored Wigan's second until a calamitous Ali Al-Habsi own goal levelled the scores again. The game looked set to finish 2–2 before a Wigan counter-attack allowed Gómez to seal his hat-trick and the win. Three days later the final game of the month saw Reading head north to face Aston Villa. Despite several chances, neither team could make the breakthrough until the last ten minutes when Christian Benteke scored a header to give Villa a vital 1–0 win. Although the win against Everton briefly lifted the Royals out of the bottom three, defeats by relegation rivals Wigan and Aston Villa meant they finished November in 19th, four points off safety.

=== December ===
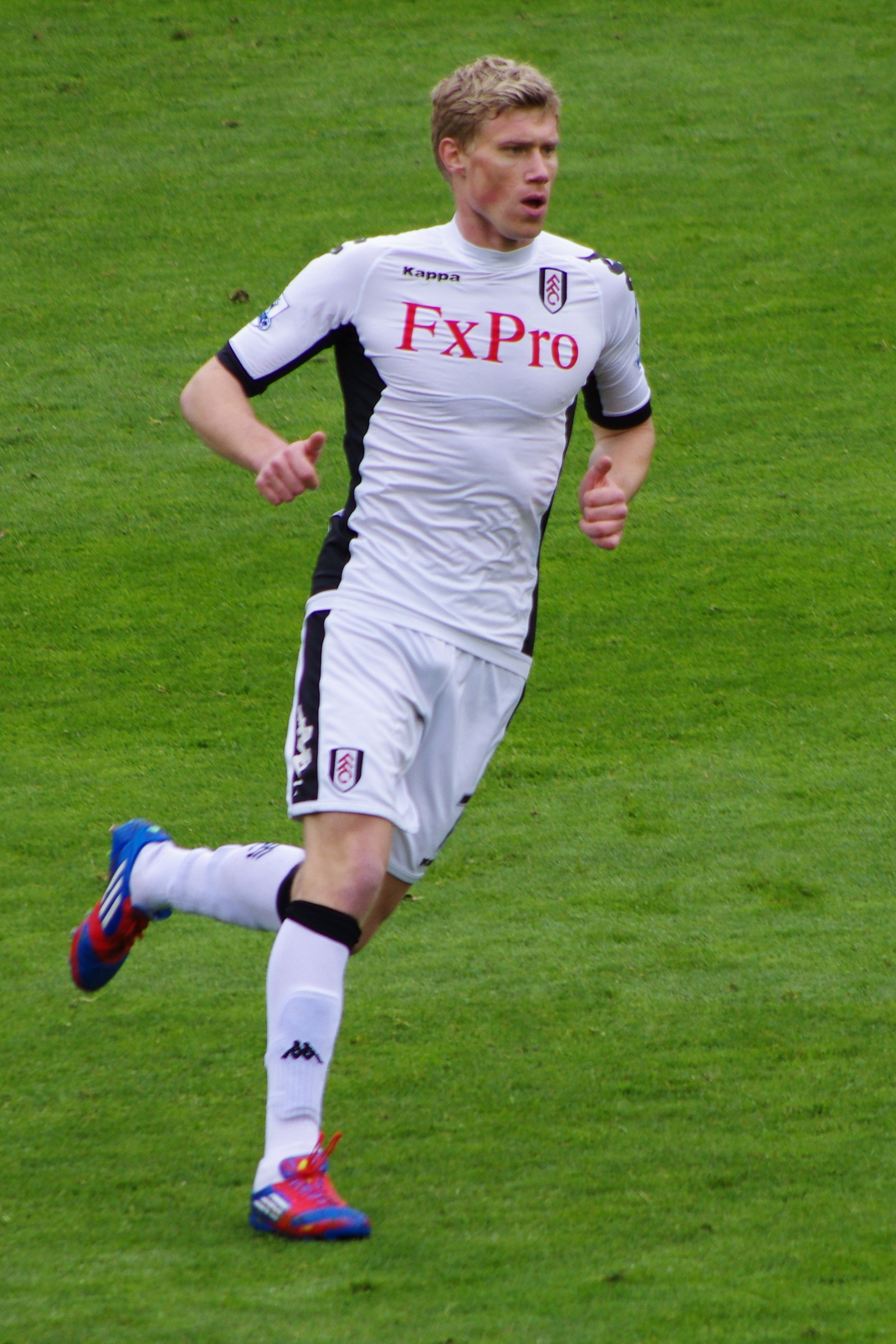
Pavel Pogrebnyak whose early goal against West Ham United gave Reading just their second win of the season. Pictured in 2012, playing for Fulham.

Reading started the month with a home game against Manchester United. The Royals took the lead through Hal Robson-Kanu before an Anderson strike and a Wayne Rooney penalty, following a Jay Tabb foul, gave United a 2–1 lead after 16 minutes. Three minutes later Adam Le Fondre headed in a Nicky Shorey corner to level the scores, before Sean Morrison put Reading back in front from another Shorey corner. Rooney scored his second after half an hour to again bring the visitors level before Robin van Persie scored five minutes later to give United a 4–3 lead and the win. With all seven goals coming in the first 35 minutes, the game equalled a Premier League record for most goals scored in the first half of a match. On 2 December the draw for the FA Cup third round took place with Reading handed an away tie against Crawley Town to be played in early January. Three days later Shaun Cummings became the latest player to commit his future to the club, signing a new two-and-a-half-year contract. The news was followed by confirmation that, despite initial hopes his injury sustained in November was not too serious, Alex McCarthy had been forced to undergo shoulder surgery, potentially ruling him out for the rest of the season.

Reading's next league game was an away trip to Southampton on 8 December which they lost 1–0. A second half Jason Puncheon goal was enough to secure the win for Southampton in a game they dominated. Three days later Reading travelled north to play their postponed match against Sunderland, originally scheduled to be played in August. A disappointing performance saw Sunderland run out 3–0 winners with goals from James McClean and Steven Fletcher in the first half, and Stéphane Sessègnon in second half injury time. Academy graduate Dominic Samuel made his professional debut in the game, coming on in the 72nd minute and becoming Reading's youngest top flight player in the process. Controversy arose after the game when it emerged that Danny Guthrie had refused to travel with the team to Sunderland, stating that his "head was not in the right place" to play. He was fined two-weeks wages by the club and later issued an apology to his teammates and the fans.

In a quiet month of loan activity young goalkeeper Jon Henly was the only outgoing player, joining Hungerford Town on 14 December on a one-month deal. On 17 December Reading were back at the Madejski Stadium to face Arsenal in what turned out to be another high scoring game between the two sides. The visitors took a 4–0 lead through Lukas Podolski and a Santi Cazorla hat-trick before the Royals gave themselves a lifeline with two quick goals from Le Fondre and Jimmy Kébé. Any hopes of a comeback were dashed after 80 minutes though when Theo Walcott scored Arsenal's fifth as the game finished 5–2. The following weekend Reading were away to Manchester City and despite putting in a much improved performance, they were beaten 1–0. The Royals held out for 93 minutes until Gareth Barry rose above Nicky Shorey to head past Adam Federici and snatch victory. Boxing day saw the visit of Swansea City with a 0–0 draw enough to end a run of seven straight defeats. Adam Le Fondre had a second half goal disallowed for handball though they created few other chances with Federici forced to pull off a number of saves to keep Swansea from scoring. On the same day Matt Partridge returned from his loan spell at Bognor Regis Town having spent two months with the Rocks. The last game of the month saw Reading clinch a vital 1–0 win over West Ham United at the Madejski. A mistake from James Collins allowed Pavel Pogrebnyak to score after just five minutes and the Royals held on for just their second win of the season. Despite a good end to the month, the team managed just four points from a possible 21 and remained in 19th place going into the new year. The year ended with the return of Simon Church from his loan spell at Huddersfield having been with the Yorkshire side since early November.

=== January ===
The first game of the new year took place on 1 January against Tottenham Hotspur at White Hart Lane. Reading took the lead in the 4th minute when Ian Harte's free kick rebounded off the crossbar allowing Pavel Pogrebnyak to head in from close range. Spurs levelled within five minutes through Michael Dawson, before second half goals from Emmanuel Adebayor and Clint Dempsey secured a 3–1 win. Four days later Reading played their FA Cup third round match away to Crawley Town and quickly found themselves 1–0 down when Nicky Adams scored after just 14 seconds, the fastest ever FA Cup goal. Adam Le Fondre equalised in the 13th minute before Noel Hunt scored Reading's second just before half time. A Le Fondre penalty soon after half time sealed a 3–1 win and saw the Royals progress into the fourth round. The day after the match, the draw for the fourth round was made with Reading handed a home tie against Sheffield United to be played at the end of the month. On 12 January the team were back in Premier League action at home to West Bromwich Albion. The visitors took the lead after 19 minutes through Romelu Lukaku who then doubled the lead midway through the second half. With less than ten minutes remaining Jimmy Kébé pulled one back from close range, before winning a penalty which Adam Le Fondre converted to level the scores. The comeback was completed on 90 minutes when Pavel Pogrebnyak latched onto the end of a free kick, tapping it past Ben Foster and clinching what had seemed an unlikely win.

The following weekend Reading travelled north to face Newcastle United and secured their first away win of the season thanks to another late comeback. Newcastle took the lead in the first half through a Yohan Cabaye freekick and remained in front until the 71st minute when substitute Adam Le Fondre equalised with his first touch. Le Fondre then won the game with his second goal six minutes later as Reading held on for a 2–1 victory. On 26 January Reading's FA Cup fourth round tie against Sheffield United took place at the Madejski Stadium. The Royals took the lead after six minutes through Noel Hunt and doubled their advantage just before half time when Mikele Leigertwood scored with a powerful shot from distance. Hunt grabbed his second five minutes after half time with Garath McCleary also getting on the score sheet as game finished 4–0. Following the match the Royals were drawn against Manchester United in the fifth round with the tie to be played in mid-February. Reading's final game of the month took place four days later with the visit of Chelsea to the Madejski. Goals from Juan Mata in first half injury time, and Frank Lampard midway through the second half had given Chelsea a comfortable lead but with 87 minutes gone Adam Le Fondre pulled one back for Reading. With the hosts still heading for defeat, Le Fondre then volleyed in a Hope Akpan flick-on to salvage a point in the fifth minute of stoppage time. Having secured seven points from a possible twelve in January, the draw with Chelsea took the Royals out of the relegation zone for the first time since November. For their roles in the revival, manager Brian McDermott was awarded the Premier League Manager of the Month award, whilst Le Fondre, who scored fives times in the league during January, was named Premier League Player of the Month.

==== Transfers ====
Reading's first piece of business was announced on 31 December with Portuguese utility player Daniel Carriço joining the club for €750,000 from Sporting CP. On 8 January midfielder Hope Akpan signed on a three-and-a-half-year deal from Crawley Town for £300,000 plus add-ons, and he was followed by Stephen Kelly who joined from Fulham on a two-and-a-half-year contract three days later. In mid-January Stopilla Sonzu joined the club for four days to train and be assessed by the coaching staff with a view to a potential permanent transfer in the future. No further deals were completed until 30 January when Nick Blackman joined from Sheffield United on a three-and-a-half-year contract for an undisclosed fee. Both Akpan and Blackman joined from their respective club within days of playing against Reading in the FA Cup. Following the closure of the transfer window manager Brian McDermott revealed that the club had tried, and failed, in last-minute deals to sign Tom Ince, and former Reading player Gylfi Sigurðsson.

As well as the four permanent transfers, January saw several players return to, and leave the club on loan. On 1 January Gozie Ugwu returned from his spell at Yeovil Town, whilst Michael Hector extended his stay at Aldershot Town the following day, keeping him with the club until the end of the month. Young striker Dominic Samuel joined Colchester United on a one-month youth loan on 3 January with Karl Sheppard returning from his spell at Accrington Stanley the same day. The day after, Jake Taylor extended his loan with Cheltenham Town for another month, though Lawson D'Ath's deal with the Robins was not renewed and he returned to Reading having made three appearances. On 8 January Angus MacDonald's loan to Torquay United was extended until the end of the season and a week later Jon Henly returned after a one-month stay with Hungerford Town. Having returned from Yeovil two weeks earlier, Gozie Ugwu was on the move again, this time to Plymouth Argyle on a one-month youth loan on 17 January. A final flurry of activity began on 28 January when Jake Taylor was recalled from Cheltenham having started just one game since his loan was extended. The following day Michael Hector returned from Aldershot and was immediately loaned out again, swapping places with Taylor and joining Cheltenham for a month. The last day of the month saw two young players move out on loan. Jordan Obita joined Oldham Athletic for one month whilst Karl Sheppard rejoined his former club Shamrock Rovers until July 2013. Deadline day also saw Dominic Samuel return from his spell at Colchester having made two appearances.

=== February ===
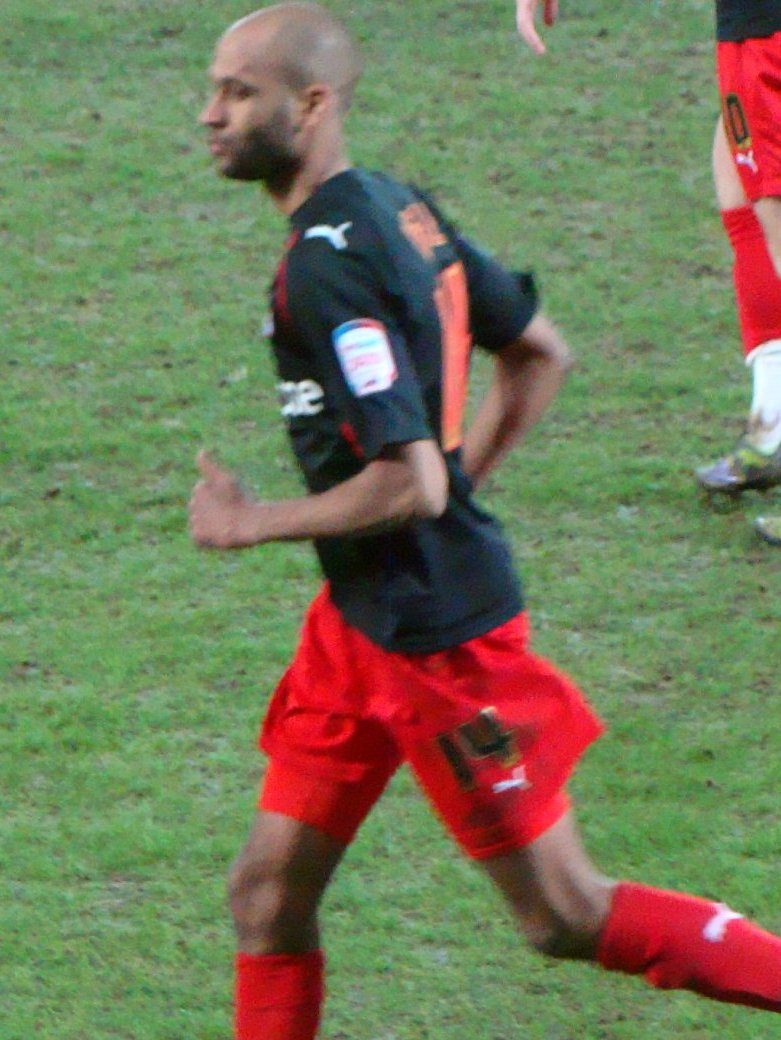
Jimmy Kébé, who scored twice against Sunderland to give Reading their third win in four games. Pictured in 2011.

The month began with a home game against Sunderland on 2 February which Reading won 2–1. The hosts took the lead through Jimmy Kébé in the 7th minute, only for Craig Gardner to equalise with a penalty midway through the first half. With only five minutes left, Kébé popped up again and headed in at the far post to seal victory for Reading and make it three wins from four matches. The following week Reading travelled away to Stoke City and after a goalless first half, found themselves 2–0 down thanks to goals from Robert Huth and Cameron Jerome. Adrian Mariappa pulled one back with his first goal for Reading in the 83rd minute, but Stoke held on for a 2–1 win, ending Reading's four-game unbeaten run. On 12 February, having fallen out of first team contention, Kaspars Gorkšs joined Wolverhampton Wanderers on a three-month loan with a view to a permanent deal.

In preparation for their FA Cup fifth round tie away to Manchester United, Reading headed to Dubai for warm weather training. The match itself took place on 18 February with United prevailing 2–1 thanks to second half goals from Nani and Javier Hernández. A late Jobi McAnuff strike, his first goal of the season, proved no more than a consolation for the Royals. The following day, despite barely featuring because of injury, Gozie Ugwu extended his stay with Plymouth Argyle for a second month. The final game in February saw Wigan Athletic visit the Madejski Stadium for a crucial relegation clash. Wigan took the lead on 44 minutes through Arouna Koné, who then scored again just one minute later to give Wigan a 2–0 lead at the break. Maynor Figueroa made it 3–0 soon after the restart before Pavel Pogrebnyak completed a miserable day for the Royals when he was sent off for a reckless challenge after 56 minutes. Four days later the club announced that they had signed a partnership with Turkish side Galatasaray, paving the way for co-operation on academy, scouting and other matters. February ended with news that Michael Hector had extended his stay at Cheltenham Town, whilst Jake Taylor joined Crawley Town on a one-month loan.

=== March ===
On 2 March Reading travelled to Everton for their first game of the month. Goals from Marouane Fellaini, Steven Pienaar and Kevin Mirallas gave Everton a commanding lead, with Hal Robson-Kanu's late strike only a consolation as the hosts ran 3–1 winners. The following week Jordan Obita extended his youth loan at Oldham Athletic until 1 April, whilst Jay Tabb moved to Ipswich Town on a one-month loan having fallen out of first-team contention. On 7 March, after nearly eight years with Reading, Brynjar Gunnarsson moved back to KR, the club he started his career with. Two days later Reading were at the Madejski Stadium to face fellow relegation rivals Aston Villa. The Royals took the lead through a Nathan Baker own goal but held on to it for just one minute before Christian Benteke levelled for Villa. Gabriel Agbonlahor then struck on the stroke of half time, and with no further goals in the second half, the game finished 2–1 to the visitors. The evening before the game, the club had received further bad news with Jason Roberts revealing that he would miss the rest of the season after having surgery on the hip injury he sustained against Southampton in December.

On 11 March, after four successive defeats, manager Brian McDermott was sacked by the club. He was followed out of the club by first-team coaches Nigel Gibbs and Yannis Anastasiou, with Academy Manager Eamonn Dolan taking over first team duties in a caretaker capacity. On the same day, Gozie Ugwu was recalled early from his injury-plagued loan spell at Plymouth Argyle, whilst later that week, Lawson D'Ath and Charlie Losasso both left the club on loan, joining Exeter City and Isthmian Premier Division side Whitehawk respectively until the end of the season. On 16 March, Dolan took charge of his first and only game as caretaker manager away to Manchester United, with a solitary Wayne Rooney goal giving United a 1–0 win. Soon afterwards Reading announced their first transfer business of the forthcoming summer, with Icelandic duo Samúel Fridjónsson and Tómas Urbancic set to sign on 1 July. Fifteen days after McDermott was sacked, Nigel Adkins was appointed as the Reading's new manager on a three-year contract with his former assistant at Southampton, Andy Crosby, also joining the club. Adkins first game in charge took place on 30 March and saw Reading travel to Arsenal with the game finishing 4–1 to the Gunners. Hal Robson-Kanu again scored a late consolation, with Arsenal's four goals bringing their total against Reading this season to 16. The end of the month saw Michael Hector extend his loan with Cheltenham Town until the end of the season, and Jake Taylor return after a one-month spell at Crawley Town.

=== April ===
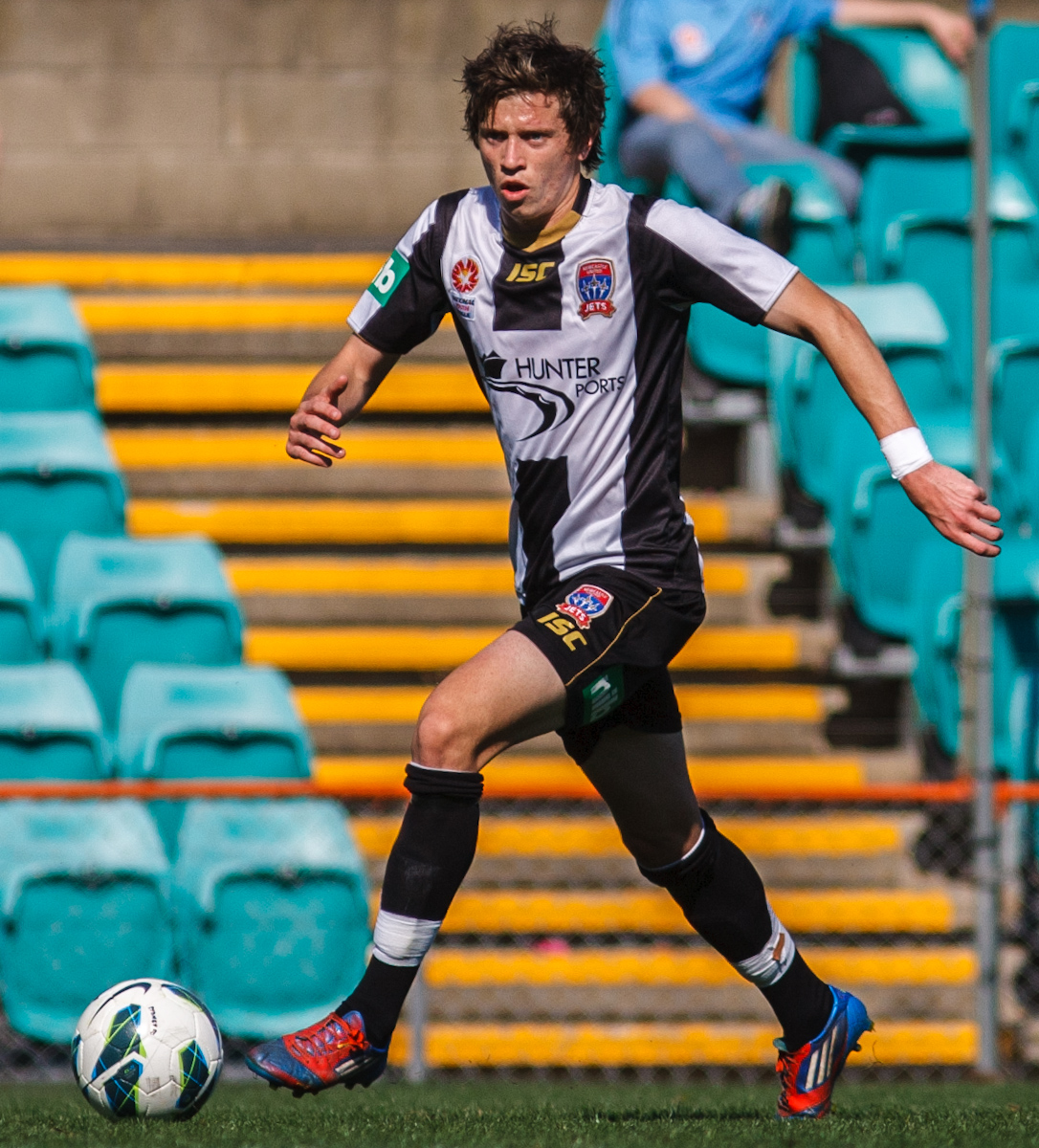
Craig Goodwin who joined Reading on trial for three weeks in April. Pictured in 2012, playing for Newcastle Jets.

April began with the return of Jordan Obita following his two-month spell at Oldham Athletic and the extension of Jay Tabb's loan at Ipswich Town until the end of the season. The first game of the month was at home against Southampton on 6 April with the Saints winning 2–0. A goal in each half from Jay Rodriguez and Adam Lallana were enough for a comfortable Southampton victory. Two days later Newcastle Jets player Craig Goodwin joined the club on trial for two weeks and though the trial was later extended to allow Goodwin to play in a reserve game, he was not offered a contract following its conclusion. On 11 April, Reading announced another young player would be joining the club over the summer with 17-year-old American goalkeeper Aleksander Gogic set to sign a two-year professional deal prior to the 2013–14 season. Reading's current goalkeeper Alex McCarthy was largely to thank for the Royals' 0–0 draw with Liverpool on 13 April, with his performance earning him the man-of-the-match award and giving Reading their first clean sheet in nine games against Liverpool.

One week later the team travelled to Carrow Road to face Norwich City. After a goalless first half, Norwich struck twice in 90 seconds with a long range Garath McCleary shot not enough to salvage anything as the game finished 2–1 to the hosts. The last game of the month took place on 28 April as Reading faced 19th place Queens Park Rangers at the Madejski Stadium. Despite both teams needing a win to maintain any hope of avoiding relegation, a drab 0–0 draw condemned both to Championship football for the 2013–14 season.

=== May ===
Reading travelled to Fulham on 4 May and recorded only their second away win of the season with two goals from Hal Robson-Kanu and one each from Jem Karacan and Adam Le Fondre securing a 4–2 victory. Le Fondre's strike also set a new Premier League record for most goals scored as a substitute. Ten days later, Reading played their last home game of the season against Manchester City, losing 0–2. Prior to kick-off, Le Fondre was named the Reading F.C. Player of the Season, with Alex McCarthy and Hal Robson-Kanu coming second and third respectively. On 16 May, McCarthy also became Reading's first youth graduate to be called up to the England squad since the start of the academy era. On the same day the club announced they had agreed in principle to buy land at Bearwood Lakes Golf Club for a new training ground. The final game of the season took place on 19 May away to West Ham United. Garath McCleary and Le Fondre both scored for Reading, but a Kevin Nolan hat-trick helped the Hammers to a 4–2 win and consigned the Royals to a 22nd defeat in 38 games. The following week the club announced that ten senior players would be leaving the club upon the expiry of their contracts. Among those leaving were Noel Hunt, Ian Harte, Nicky Shorey and Jay Tabb.

=== Under-21s and Academy ===
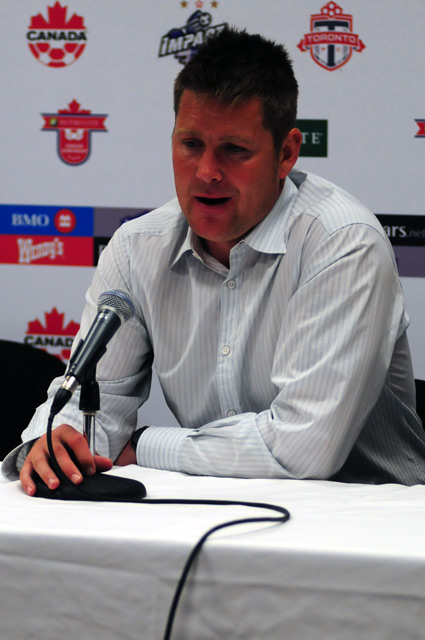
Chris Cummins, Reading's development coach and under-21 manager. Pictured in 2009 whilst interim head coach of Toronto FC.

Reading's application for Category 1 academy status under the new Elite Player Performance Plan meant that their under-21 and under-18 teams would compete in the new Professional Development League 1 for the 2012–13 season. Although the under-21 league games are predominantly contested by the younger players, one goalkeeper, and three outfield players over the age of 21 are eligible for selection for each fixture.

The under-21s first game of the season was a 3–1 defeat away to West Ham with Ryan Edwards scoring Reading's only goal. A heavy 6–1 defeat of West Bromwich Albion, and 3–0 victory over Norwich City followed before a run of four games without a win. They won a further two games, against Norwich and West Ham, but ended the first league phase with another four-game winless run which consigned them to seventh position. The second-from-bottom finish meant the under-21s were placed in Group 2 for the second phase of the competition. They again began with a defeat, losing 3–1 away to Manchester City but went on to win six of their next eight games, including two wins over Stoke City and a 3–0, Dominic Samuel inspired victory over Man City. Their hopes of reaching the knockout stages were ended though after three successive defeats saw them finish in third place, with only the top team advancing. With six goals each, Lawson D'Ath and Dominic Samuel were Reading's joint top scorers over the season. At the end of the season Charlie Losasso and Josh Webb, who had both featured regularly for the under-21s, were among the ten players released by the club. Reading also confirmed and that development coach, and under-21 manager, Chris Cummins would leave at the end of the season, having been with the club since 2011.

The under-18s also started their season against West Ham, drawing 2–2. They lost just one game during the initial league phase, a 3–2 defeat by Bolton, finishing top of the table with 11 wins from 14. The team also progressed in the FA Youth Cup, beating Brentford 5–1 at Griffin Park in December. By winning their league, the under-18s were placed in the Elite Group for the second half of the season. They struggled initially, losing three of their first four matches and were also knocked out of the Youth Cup in the fourth round after a 2–0 home defeat by Bolton. Following the run of defeats, the under-18s won ten matches in a row, including doubles over Chelsea and Crystal Palace, finishing second in the group on goal difference to Fulham and qualifying for knockout stage. After beating Everton 4–0 in the semi-final Reading faced Fulham in the final but could not extend their winning run to twelve, losing 3–0. Following their successful season, the club offered eight scholars professional contracts for the 2013–14 season, including Uche Ikpeazu who was the top scorer in the country at under-18 level with 28 goals.

== Transfers ==
=== In ===
Date	Position	Nationality	Name	From	Fee
2 May 2012	GK	(Scotland)	Jonathan Henly	Academy	—
2 May 2012	DF	(England)	Matt Partridge	Academy	—
2 May 2012	FW	(England)	Dominic Samuel	Academy	—
2 May 2012	MF	(England)	Josh Webb	Academy	—
16 May 2012	MF	(Jamaica)	Garath McCleary	Nottingham Forest	Bosman
29 June 2012	MF	(England)	Danny Guthrie	Newcastle United	Bosman
5 July 2012	FW	(Russia)	Pavel Pogrebnyak	Fulham	Free
6 July 2012	DF	(Republic of Ireland)	Pierce Sweeney	(Republic of Ireland) Bray Wanderers	Undisclosed
10 July 2012	DF	(England)	Nicky Shorey	West Bromwich Albion	Free
17 July 2012	DF	(Jamaica)	Adrian Mariappa	Watford	Undisclosed
17 July 2012	DF	(Wales)	Chris Gunter	Nottingham Forest	£2,300,000
20 August 2012	GK	(England)	Stuart Taylor	Manchester City	Free
1 January 2013	DF	(Portugal)	Daniel Carriço	(Portugal) Sporting CP	€750,000
8 January 2013	MF	(England)	Hope Akpan	Crawley Town	£300,000
11 January 2013	DF	(Republic of Ireland)	Stephen Kelly	Fulham	Undisclosed
30 January 2013	FW	(England)	Nick Blackman	Sheffield United	Undisclosed

=== Out ===
Date	Position	Nationality	Name	To	Fee
13 July 2012	FW	(France)	Mathieu Manset	(Switzerland) Sion	Undisclosed
6 August 2012	MF	(England)	Michail Antonio	Sheffield Wednesday	Undisclosed
7 March 2013	MF	(Iceland)	Brynjar Gunnarsson	(Iceland) KR	Free

=== Loans out ===
Date from	Date to	Position	Nationality	Name	To
17 July 2012	Season-long	DF	(England)	Joseph Mills	Burnley
19 July 2012	1 January 2013	FW	(England)	Gozie Ugwu	Yeovil Town
24 July 2012	22 November 2012	DF	(England)	Michael Hector	Shrewsbury Town
30 July 2012	28 September 2012	DF	(England)	Angus MacDonald	AFC Wimbledon
4 August 2012	3 January 2013	FW	(Republic of Ireland)	Karl Sheppard	Accrington Stanley
4 August 2012	Season-long	FW	(England)	Brett Williams	Woking
17 August 2012	20 November 2012	GK	(Denmark)	Mikkel Andersen	Portsmouth
21 August 2012	21 October 2012	MF	(England)	Jordan Obita	Portsmouth
19 October 2012	26 December 2012	DF	(England)	Matt Partridge	Bognor Regis Town
25 October 2012	2 January 2013	MF	(England)	Lawson D'Ath	Cheltenham Town
8 November 2012	31 December 2012	FW	(Wales)	Simon Church	Huddersfield Town
22 November 2012	29 January 2013	DF	(England)	Michael Hector	Aldershot Town
22 November 2012	End of the season	DF	(England)	Angus MacDonald	Torquay United
22 November 2012	28 January 2013	MF	(Wales)	Jake Taylor	Cheltenham Town
14 December 2012	14 January 2013	GK	(Scotland)	Jon Henly	Hungerford Town
3 January 2013	31 January 2013	FW	(England)	Dominic Samuel	Colchester United
17 January 2013	11 March 2013	FW	(England)	Gozie Ugwu	Plymouth Argyle
30 January 2013	End of the season	DF	(England)	Michael Hector	Cheltenham Town
31 January 2013	1 April 2013	MF	(England)	Jordan Obita	Oldham Athletic
31 January 2013	3 November 2013	FW	(Republic of Ireland)	Karl Sheppard	(Republic of Ireland) Shamrock Rovers
12 February 2013	End of the season	DF	(Latvia)	Kaspars Gorkšs	Wolverhampton Wanderers
28 February 2013	31 March 2013	MF	(Wales)	Jake Taylor	Crawley Town
7 March 2013	End of the season	MF	(Republic of Ireland)	Jay Tabb	Ipswich Town
15 March 2013	End of the season	MF	(England)	Lawson D'Ath	Exeter City
15 March 2013	End of the season	MF	(England)	Charlie Losasso	Whitehawk

=== Released ===
Date	Position	Nationality	Name	Joined	Date
24 May 2013	FW	(Wales)	Simon Church	Charlton Athletic	1 August 2013
24 May 2013	LB	(Republic of Ireland)	Ian Harte	Bournemouth	1 July 2013
24 May 2013	FW	(Republic of Ireland)	Noel Hunt	Leeds United	3 July 2013
24 May 2013	MF	(England)	Charlie Losasso	Bournemouth	9 September 2013
24 May 2013	CB	(England)	Angus MacDonald	Salisbury City	23 August 2013
24 May 2013	LB	(England)	Joseph Mills	Burnley	1 July 2013
24 May 2013	LB	(England)	Nicky Shorey	Bristol City	30 August 2013
24 May 2013	CM	(Republic of Ireland)	Jay Tabb	Ipswich Town	1 July 2013
24 May 2013	MF	(England)	Josh Webb	Hayes & Yeading United	16 August 2013
24 May 2013	FW	(England)	Brett Williams	Aldershot Town	8 August 2013
7 June 2013	FW	(England)	Nicholas Bignall	Basingstoke Town	March 2014

=== Trial ===
Date From	Date To	Position	Nationality	Name	Last club
13 July 2012	20 August 2012	GK	(England)	Stuart Taylor	Manchester City
8 April 2013	8 May 2013	DF	(Australia)	Craig Goodwin	Newcastle Jets

== Squad ==
As of match played 19 May 2013

No.	Name	Nationality	Position	Date of birth (Age (Note: Age as of the end of the season))	Signed from	Signed in	Contract ends	Apps.	Goals
Goalkeepers
1	Adam Federici	(Australia)	GK	31 January 1985 (aged 28)	Torres	2005	2015	192	1
21	Alex McCarthy	(England)	GK	3 December 1989 (aged 23)	Academy	2007	2015	30	0
31	Mikkel Andersen	(Denmark)	GK	17 December 1988 (aged 24)	AB Copenhagen	2007	2015	0	0
41	Stuart Taylor	(England)	GK	28 November 1980 (aged 32)	Manchester City	2012	2013	4	0
42	Jon Henly	(Scotland)	GK	7 June 1994 (aged 18)	Academy	2012	2013	0	0
Defenders
2	Chris Gunter	(Wales)	RB	21 July 1989 (aged 23)	Nottingham Forest	2012	2015	23	1
3	Nicky Shorey	(England)	LB	19 February 1981 (aged 32)	West Bromwich Albion	2012	2013	317	13
5	Alex Pearce (Note: Pearce was born in Oxford, England, but qualified to represent Scotland and the Republic of Ireland internationally through his parents and made his international debut for the Scottish U-21 side in May 2008, then went on to represent Ireland at full international level on 11 September 2012.)	(Republic of Ireland)	CB	9 November 1988 (aged 24)	Academy	2006	2013	145	12
6	Adrian Mariappa (Note: Mariappa was born in Harrow, London, England, but qualified to represent Jamaica internationally through his mother and made his international debut for the Jamaican team in May 2012 against Guyana.)	(Jamaica)	CB	3 October 1986 (aged 26)	Watford	2012	2015	32	1
15	Sean Morrison	(England)	CB	8 January 1991 (aged 22)	Swindon Town	2011	2016	22	3
17	Kaspars Gorkšs	(Latvia)	CB	6 November 1981 (aged 31)	QPR	2011	2014	60	5
23	Ian Harte	(Republic of Ireland)	LB	31 August 1977 (aged 35)	Carlisle United	2010	2013	99	15
24	Shaun Cummings (Note: Cummings was born in Hammersmith, England, but qualified to represent Jamaica and made his international debut for Jamaica in September 2013.)	(England)	RB	25 February 1989 (aged 24)	Chelsea	2009	2015	67	0
27	Stephen Kelly	(Republic of Ireland)	RB	6 September 1983 (aged 29)	Fulham	2013	2015	18	0
32	Nick Arnold	(England)	RB	3 July 1993 (aged 19)	Academy	2011	2013	0	0
34	Angus MacDonald	(England)	CB	15 October 1992 (aged 20)	Academy	2011	2013	0	0
35	Michael Hector (Note: Hector was born in East Ham, England, but qualified to represent Jamaica and made his international debut for Jamaica in June 2015.)	(England)	CB	19 July 1992 (aged 20)	Academy	2010	2014	0	0
46	Matt Partridge	(England)	CB	7 November 1993 (aged 19)	Academy	2012	2013	0	0
47	Pierce Sweeney	(Republic of Ireland)	CB	11 September 1994 (aged 18)	Bray Wanderers	2012		0	0
—	Joseph Mills	(England)	LB	30 October 1989 (aged 23)	Southampton	2011	2014	16	0
Midfielders
4	Jem Karacan (Note: Karacan was born in Lewisham, England, but also qualifies to represent Turkey internationally through his father and has represented Turkey at every youth level.)	(Turkey)	CM	21 February 1989 (aged 24)	Academy	2007	2015	159	9
8	Mikele Leigertwood (Note: Leigertwood was born in Enfield, England, but qualified to represent Antigua and Barbuda and made his international debut for Antigua and Barbuda in November 2008.)	(Antigua and Barbuda)	CM	12 November 1982 (aged 30)	QPR	2011	2014	105	10
11	Jobi McAnuff (Note: McAnuff was born in Enfield, England, but qualified to represent Jamaica and made his international debut for Jamaica in May 2002.)	(Jamaica)	LW	9 November 1981 (aged 31)	Watford	2009	2014	171	14
12	Garath McCleary (Note: McCleary was born in Oxford, England, but qualified to represent Jamaica and made his international debut for Jamaica in February 2013.)	(Jamaica)	RW	15 May 1987 (aged 26)	Nottingham Forest	2012	2015	37	4
14	Jimmy Kebe (Note: Kébé was born in Vitry-sur-Seine, France, but qualified to represent Mali internationally and made his international debut for Mali in 2004.)	(Mali)	RW	19 January 1984 (aged 29)	Lens	2008	2014	190	31
16	Jay Tabb (Note: Tabb was born in Wandsworth, England, but also qualified to represent the Republic of Ireland and represented Ireland at U-21 level in 2005.)	(Republic of Ireland)	CM	21 February 1984 (aged 29)	Coventry City	2009	2013	105	0
19	Hal Robson-Kanu (Note: Robson-Kanu was born in Ealing, England, and represented England at U-19 and U-20 level, but also qualified to represent Wales through his grandmother and made his international debut for the Welsh U-21 side in May 2010 before making his full international debut for Wales five days later.)	(Wales)	LW	21 May 1989 (aged 23)	Academy	2007	2014	119	17
20	Danny Guthrie	(England)	CM	18 April 1987 (aged 26)	Newcastle United	2012	2015	25	1
25	Jake Taylor	(Wales)	MF	1 December 1991 (aged 21)	Academy	2009	2014	2	0
28	Hope Akpan	(England)	CM	14 August 1991 (aged 21)	Crawley Town	2013	2016	9	0
29	Daniel Carriço	(Portugal)	CM	4 August 1988 (aged 24)	Sporting CP	2013	2015	3	0
37	Jordan Obita	(England) (Note: Obita was born in Oxford, England, but qualified to represent Uganda and made his international debut for Uganda in June 2025.)	MF	8 December 1993 (aged 19)	Academy	2010	2014	2	0
38	Charlie Losasso	(England)	MF	11 November 1992 (aged 20)	Academy	2011	2013	0	0
40	Lawson D'Ath	(England)	MF	24 December 1992 (aged 20)	Academy	2010	2013	1	0
43	Josh Webb	(England)	MF	3 October 1993 (aged 19)	Academy	2012	2013	0	0
45	Ryan Edwards	(Australia)	MF	17 November 1993 (aged 19)	Australian Institute of Sport	2011	2015	0	0
Forwards
7	Pavel Pogrebnyak	(Russia)	FW	8 November 1983 (aged 29)	Fulham	2012	2016	32	8
9	Adam Le Fondre	(England)	FW	2 December 1986 (aged 26)	Rotherham United	2011	2015	70	26
10	Noel Hunt	(Republic of Ireland)	FW	26 December 1982 (aged 30)	Dundee United	2008	2013	162	39
18	Simon Church (Note: Church was born in High Wycombe, England, but also qualifies to represent Wales through his grandparents and made his international debut for the Welsh U-21 side in August 2007 before making his full international debut for Wales in May 2009.)	(Wales)	FW	10 December 1988 (aged 24)	Academy	2007	2013	122	24
22	Nicholas Bignall	(England)	FW	11 July 1990 (aged 22)	Academy	2008	2013	4	2
30	Nick Blackman	(England)	FW	11 November 1989 (aged 23)	Sheffield United	2013	2016	11	0
33	Jason Roberts (Note: Roberts was born in Brent, England, but qualified to represent Grenada internationally through his father and made his international debut in 1999.)	(Grenada)	FW	25 January 1978 (aged 35)	Blackburn Rovers	2012	2014	29	7
36	Gozie Ugwu	(England)	FW	22 April 1993 (aged 20)	Academy	2011	2014	0	0
39	Brett Williams	(England)	FW	1 December 1987 (aged 25)	Eastleigh	2011	2013	0	0
44	Dominic Samuel	(England)	FW	1 April 1994 (aged 19)	Academy	2012		1	0
—	Karl Sheppard	(Republic of Ireland)	FW	14 February 1991 (aged 22)	Shamrock Rovers	2012	2014	0	0

=== Left club during season ===
Note: Flags indicate national team as defined under FIFA eligibility rules; some limited exceptions apply. Players may hold more than one non-FIFA nationality.

No.	Pos.	Nation	Player
26	MF	ISL	Brynjar Gunnarsson (to KR Reykjavík)

== Competitions ==
Competition	Started round	Final position / round	First match	Last match
Premier League	—	19th	18 August 2012	19 May 2013
League Cup	2nd round	4th round	28 August 2012	31 October 2012
FA Cup	3rd round	5th round	5 January 2013	18 February 2013

Updated to match played match played 19 May 2013
Source: Competitions

=== Pre-season friendlies ===
10 July 2012	Didcot Town	2–3	Reading XI	Didcot
19:45 BST (UTC+1)	Clark (2nd Half); Heysham (2nd Half)	Reading FC	Obita (1st Half); Sheppard (1st Half); Edwards (1st Half)	Stadium: nPower Loop Meadow Stadium

14 July 2012	AFC Wimbledon	0–7	Reading	Kingston upon Thames
15:00 BST (UTC+1)		Reading FC	Le Fondre 26' (pen.), 44'; Antonio 50'; Church 52', 56', 67'; Obita 57'	Stadium: Kingsmeadow; Attendance: 2,140

17 July 2012	Ebbsfleet United	2–3	Reading XI	Northfleet
19:45 BST (UTC+1)	Greenhalgh 39'; Phipp 61'	Reading FC; Ebbsfleet	Taylor 16'; Obita 53'; Williams 58'	Stadium: Stonebridge Road; Attendance: 537

21 July 2012	Basingstoke Town	5–0	Reading XI	Basingstoke
15:00 BST (UTC+1)	Sills 9'; Holder-Spooner 25', 37', 40'; Delano 70'	Basingstoke Town		Stadium: The Camrose

21 July 2012	Quarteirense (Portugal)	1–1	Reading	Quarteira, Portugal
20:00 BST (UTC+1)	Goal	Reading FC	Harte 51'	Stadium: Estádio Municipal de Quarteira

24 July 2012	Boreham Wood	1–2	Reading XI	Borehamwood
19:30 BST (UTC+1)	Hastings 16'	Boreham Wood	Samuel 4', 89'	Stadium: Meadow Park

24 July 2012	Sheffield Wednesday	2–0	Reading	Albufeira, Portugal
20:00 BST (UTC+1)	M. Jones 44'; O'Grady 86'	Reading FC		Stadium: Estádio Municipal

27 July 2012	Olhanense (Portugal)	1–1	Reading	Olhão, Portugal
20:30 BST (UTC+1)	Duarte 64' (pen.)	Reading FC	Guthrie 23'	Stadium: Jose Arjanco Stadium

28 July 2012	Salisbury City	1–0	Reading XI	Salisbury
15:00 BST (UTC+1)	Fitchett 45+' (pen.)	Salisbury		Stadium: The Raymond McEnhill Stadium

31 July 2012	Hendon	1–2	Reading XI	Hendon
19:30 BST (UTC+1)	Diedhiou (1st Half)	Reading FC	Tshibola (1st Half); Samuel (2nd Half)	Stadium: Vale Farm

4 August 2012	Bournemouth	2–2	Reading	Bournemouth
15:00 BST (UTC+1)	Thomas 32'; Addison 84'	Reading FC	Mariappa 15'; Robson-Kanu 67' (pen.)	Stadium: Dean Court

4 August 2012	Hungerford Town	0–1	Reading XI	Hungerford
15:00 BST (UTC+1)		[Reading FC]	Samuel	Stadium: Bulpit Lane

7 August 2012 Michel Kuipers; Testimonial	Brighton & Hove Albion	1–1	Reading	Brighton and Hove
19:45 BST (UTC+1)	Vicente 32' (pen.)	Reading FC	Robson-Kanu 89'	Stadium: Falmer Stadium; Attendance: 8,107

7 August 2012	Hemel Hempstead Town	1–1	Reading XI	Hemel Hempstead
19:45 BST (UTC+1)	Nolan 65'	Hemel FC	Obita 35'	Stadium: Vauxhall Road

11 August 2012	Reading	2–0	Crystal Palace	Reading
15:00 BST (UTC+1)	Pogrebnyak 54'; Le Fondre 55'	Reading FC		Stadium: Madejski Stadium; Attendance: 6,251

11 August 2012	Eastleigh	2–4	Reading XI	Eastleigh
15:00 BST (UTC+1)	Ademola 9'; Jordan 24'	Reading FC	Taylor 45'; Tshibola 59'; Tanner 73', 75'	Stadium: Silverlake Stadium; Attendance: 177

2 September 2012	Bray Wanderers (Republic of Ireland)	1–8	Reading	Bray
16:00 BST (UTC+1)	Byrne 12'	Bray Wanderers	Le Fondre 19' (pen.), 72', 86'; Pearce 28'; Karacan 35'; Tabb 55', 74', 89'	Stadium: Carlisle Grounds

=== Premier League ===
==== Results summary ====
Overall								Home						Away					
Pld	W	D	L	GF	GA	GD	Pts	W	D	L	GF	GA	GD	W	D	L	GF	GA	GD
38	6	10	22	43	73	−30	28	4	8	7	23	33	−10	2	2	15	20	40	−20

Last updated: match played 14 May 2013.
Source: Reading F.C.

==== Results by round ====
Round	1	2	3	4	5	6	7	8	9	10	11	12	13	14	15	16	17	18	19	20	21	22	23	24	25	26	27	28	29	30	31	32	33	34	35	36	37	38
Ground	H	A	H	A	H	A	A	H	A	H	H	A	A	H	A	A	H	A	H	H	A	H	A	H	H	A	H	A	H	A	A	A	H	A	H	A	H	A
Result	D	L	L	L	D	D	L	D	D	D	W	L	L	L	L	L	L	L	D	W	L	W	W	D	W	L	L	L	L	L	L	L	D	L	D	W	L	L
Position	8	15	19	20	19	18	19	18	18	18	17	19	19	19	19	19	20	20	19	19	19	19	18	17	17	18	19	19	19	19	20	20	20	20	20	19	19	19

Updated to match(es) played on 19 May 2013. Source: BBC Sport
A = Away; H = Home; W = Win; D = Draw; L = Loss

==== Matches ====
18 August 2012 1	Reading	1–1	Stoke City	Reading
15:00 BST (UTC+1)	Le Fondre 90' (pen.)	BBC; Reading F.C.	Kightly 34'; Whitehead (yellow card) 18' (yellow-red card) 89'	Stadium: Madejski Stadium; Attendance: 23,973; Referee: Kevin Friend

22 August 2012 2	Chelsea	4–2	Reading	London
19:45 BST (UTC+1)	Lampard 18' (pen.); Cahill 69'; Torres 81'; Ivanović 90+5'	BBC; Reading F.C.	Pogrebnyak 25'; Guthrie 28'	Stadium: Stamford Bridge; Attendance: 41,733; Referee: Lee Mason

25 August 2012 3	Sunderland	Postponed^{1}	Reading	Sunderland
15:00 BST (UTC+1)		BBC; Reading F.C.		Stadium: Stadium of Light

16 September 2012 4	Reading	1–3	Tottenham Hotspur	Reading
16:00 BST (UTC+1)	Robson-Kanu 90'	BBC; Reading F.C.	Defoe 18', 74', (yellow card) 90+3'; Bale 71'	Stadium: Madejski Stadium; Attendance: 24,160; Referee: Howard Webb

22 September 2012 5	West Bromwich Albion	1–0	Reading	West Bromwich
15:00 BST (UTC+1)	Lukaku 71'	BBC; Reading F.C.		Stadium: The Hawthorns; Attendance: 23,854; Referee: Chris Foy

29 September 2012 6	Reading	2–2	Newcastle United	Reading
15:00 BST (UTC+1)	Kébé 58'; Hunt 61'	BBC; Reading FC	Ba 59', 83'	Stadium: Madejski Stadium; Attendance: 24,097; Referee: Andre Marriner

6 October 2012 7	Swansea City	2–2	Reading	Swansea
15:00 BST (UTC+1)	Michu (yellow card) 43' (goal) 71'; Routledge 78'	BBC; Reading FC	Mariappa (yellow card) 15'; Pogrebnyak 31'; Hunt 44'; Tabb (yellow card) 60'; Roberts (yellow card) 73'	Stadium: Liberty Stadium; Attendance: 20,336; Referee: Mike Dean

20 October 2012 8	Liverpool	1–0	Reading	Liverpool
15:00 BST (UTC+1)	Sterling 29'; Agger (yellow card) 57'	BBC; Reading FC	Mariappa (yellow card) 90+1'	Stadium: Anfield; Attendance: 44,874; Referee: Roger East

27 October 2012 9	Reading	3–3	Fulham	Reading
15:00 BST (UTC+1)	Leigertwood 26'; McCleary 85'; Robson-Kanu 90'	BBC; Reading FC	Ruiz 61'; Baird 77'; Berbatov 88'	Stadium: Madejski Stadium; Attendance: 24,093; Referee: Michael Jones

4 November 2012 10	Queens Park Rangers	1–1	Reading	London
13:30 GMT (UTC)	Cissé 66'	BBC; Reading FC	Gorkšs 16'; Hunt (yellow card) 34'; Le Fondre (yellow card) 90+3'	Stadium: Loftus Road; Attendance: 16,797; Referee: Michael Oliver

10 November 2012 11	Reading	0–0	Norwich City	Reading
15:00 GMT (UTC)		BBC; Reading FC	Turner (yellow card) 77'	Stadium: Madejski Stadium; Attendance: 24,080; Referee: Chris Foy

17 November 2012 12	Reading	2–1	Everton	Reading
15:00 GMT (UTC)	Le Fondre 51', 79' (pen.)	BBC; Reading FC	Naismith 10'	Stadium: Madejski Stadium; Attendance: 24,184; Referee: Martin Atkinson

24 November 2012 13	Wigan Athletic	3–2	Reading	Wigan
15:00 GMT (UTC)	Gómez 58', 68', 90+2'	BBC; Reading FC	Morrison 35'; Al-Habsi 79' (o.g.)	Stadium: DW Stadium; Attendance: 15,436; Referee: Howard Webb

27 November 2012 14	Aston Villa	1–0	Reading	Birmingham
20:00 GMT (UTC)	Clark (yellow card) 64'; Benteke 80'	BBC; Reading FC		Stadium: Villa Park; Attendance: 28,692; Referee: Mark Halsey

1 December 2012 15	Reading	3–4	Manchester United	Reading
17:30 GMT (UTC)	Robson-Kanu 8'; Le Fondre 19'; Morrison 23'	BBC; Reading FC	Anderson 13'; Rooney 16' (pen.), 30'; Van Persie 34'	Stadium: Madejski Stadium; Attendance: 24,095; Referee: Mark Halsey

8 December 2012 16	Southampton	1–0	Reading	Southampton
15:00 GMT (UTC)	Puncheon 61'	BBC; Reading FC		Stadium: St Mary's Stadium; Attendance: 29,331; Referee: Jonathan Moss

11 December 2012 3	Sunderland	3–0	Reading	Sunderland
19:45 GMT (UTC)	McClean 3'; Fletcher 28'; Sessègnon 90+4'	BBC; Reading F.C.		Stadium: Stadium of Light; Attendance: 37,723; Referee: Neil Swarbrick

17 December 2012 17	Reading	2–5	Arsenal	Reading
20:00 GMT (UTC)	Le Fondre 66'; Kébé 71'	BBC; Reading FC	Podolski 14'; Cazorla 32', 35', 60'; Walcott 80'	Stadium: Madejski Stadium; Attendance: 24,125; Referee: Anthony Taylor

22 December 2012 18	Manchester City	1–0	Reading	Manchester
15:00 GMT (UTC)	Barry 90+3'	BBC; Reading FC		Stadium: City of Manchester Stadium; Attendance: 47,007; Referee: Mike Dean

26 December 2012 19	Reading	0–0	Swansea City	Reading
15:00 GMT (UTC)	Pogrebnyak (yellow card) 57'; Le Fondre (yellow card) 74'	BBC; Reading FC	Tiendalli (yellow card) 54'	Stadium: Madejski Stadium; Attendance: 24,050; Referee: Michael Jones

29 December 2012 20	Reading	1–0	West Ham United	Reading
15:00 GMT (UTC)	Pogrebnyak 5'	BBC; Reading FC		Stadium: Madejski Stadium; Attendance: 24,183; Referee: Michael Oliver

1 January 2013 21	Tottenham Hotspur	3–1	Reading	London
15:00 GMT (UTC)	Dawson 10'; Adebayor 51'; Dempsey 79'	BBC; Reading FC	Pogrebnyak 4'	Stadium: White Hart Lane; Attendance: 36,180; Referee: Howard Webb

12 January 2013 22	Reading	3–2	West Bromwich Albion	Reading
15:00 GMT (UTC)	Kébé 82'; Le Fondre 88'; Pogrebnyak 90', (yellow card) 90+1'	BBC; Reading FC	Lukaku 19', 69'; Jones (yellow card) 37'	Stadium: Madejski Stadium; Attendance: 23,495; Referee: Kevin Friend

19 January 2013 23	Newcastle United	1–2	Reading	Newcastle upon Tyne
15:00 GMT (UTC)	Cabaye 34'	BBC; Reading FC	Le Fondre 71', 77'	Stadium: St James' Park; Attendance: 49,411; Referee: Andre Marriner

30 January 2013 24	Reading	2–2	Chelsea	Reading
20:00 GMT (UTC)	Le Fondre 87', 90+4'	BBC; Reading FC	Mata 45+1'; Lampard 66'	Stadium: Madejski Stadium; Attendance: 24,097; Referee: Mark Halsey

2 February 2013 25	Reading	2–1	Sunderland	Reading
15:00 GMT (UTC)	Kébé 7', 85'	BBC; Reading FC	Gardner 29' (pen.)	Stadium: Madejski Stadium; Attendance: 23,829; Referee: Lee Mason

9 February 2013 26	Stoke City	2–1	Reading	Stoke
15:00 GMT (UTC)	Huth 67'; Jerome 81'	BBC; Reading FC	Mariappa 83'	Stadium: Britannia Stadium; Attendance: 26,737; Referee: Michael Oliver

23 February 2013 27	Reading	0–3	Wigan Athletic	Reading
15:00 GMT (UTC)	Pogrebnyak (red card) 55'	BBC; Reading FC	Koné 44', 45+1'; Figueroa 48'	Stadium: Madejski Stadium; Attendance: 22,321; Referee: Phil Dowd

2 March 2013 28	Everton	3–1	Reading	Liverpool
15:00 GMT (UTC)	Fellaini 42'; Pienaar 59'; Mirallas 66'	BBC; Reading FC	Robson-Kanu 84'	Stadium: Goodison Park; Referee: Anthony Taylor

9 March 2013 29	Reading	1–2	Aston Villa	Reading
15:00 GMT (UTC)	Baker 32' (o.g.)	BBC; Reading FC	Benteke 33'; Agbonlahor 45'	Stadium: Madejski Stadium; Attendance: 24,102; Referee: Jonathan Moss

16 March 2013 30	Manchester United	1–0	Reading	Manchester
17:30 GMT (UTC)	Rooney 21'	BBC; Reading FC	Hunt (yellow card) 43'; Kelly (yellow card) 56'	Stadium: Old Trafford; Attendance: 75,605; Referee: Mason

30 March 2013 31	Arsenal	4–1	Reading	London
GMT (UTC)	Gervinho 11'; Cazorla 48'; Giroud 67'; Arteta 77' (pen.)	BBC; Reading FC	Robson-Kanu 68'	Stadium: Emirates Stadium; Attendance: 60,082; Referee: Chris Foy

6 April 2013 32	Reading	0–2	Southampton	Reading
12:45 BST (UTC+1)		BBC; Reading FC	Rodriguez 34'; Lallana 72'	Stadium: Madejski Stadium; Attendance: 24,108; Referee: Mike Jones

13 April 2013 33	Reading	0–0	Liverpool	Reading
15:00 BST (UTC+1)	Guthrie (yellow card) 51'; Carriço (yellow card) 88'	BBC; Reading FC	Lucas (yellow card) 42'	Stadium: Madejski Stadium; Attendance: 24,139; Referee: Mark Clattenburg

20 April 2013 34	Norwich City	2–1	Reading	Norwich
15:00 BST (UTC+1)	R. Bennett 50'; E. Bennett 52'	BBC; Reading FC	McCleary 72'	Stadium: Carrow Road; Attendance: 26,460; Referee: Mike Dean

28 April 2013 35	Reading	0–0	Queens Park Rangers	Reading
13:30 BST (UTC+1)		BBC; Reading FC	Granero (yellow card) 72'; Fábio (yellow card) 90+2'	Stadium: Madejski Stadium; Attendance: 23,388; Referee: Kevin Friend

4 May 2013 36	Fulham	2–4	Reading	London
15:00 BST (UTC+1)	Ruiz 70', 77'	BBC; Reading FC	Robson-Kanu 12' (pen.), 62'; Le Fondre 75'; Karacan 83'	Stadium: Craven Cottage; Attendance: 24,087; Referee: Neil Swarbrick

14 May 2013 37	Reading	0–2	Manchester City	Reading
20:00 BST (UTC+1)		BBC; Reading FC	Agüero 40'; Džeko 88'	Stadium: Madejski Stadium; Attendance: 22,859; Referee: Martin Atkinson

19 May 2013 38	West Ham United	4–2	Reading	London
16:00 BST (UTC+1)	Nolan 23', 79', 87'; Vaz Tê 34'	BBC; Reading FC	McCleary 53'; Le Fondre 55'	Stadium: Upton Park; Attendance: 34,973; Referee: Mike Dean

Notes

- The Premier League game against Sunderland scheduled to take place on 25 August 2012 was postponed due to a waterlogged pitch. The game was rescheduled for 19:45 on 11 December 2012.

==== League table ====
Pos	Team	Pld	W	D	L	GF	GA	GD	Pts	Qualification or relegation
16	Newcastle United	38	11	8	19	45	68	−23	41	
17	Sunderland	38	9	12	17	41	54	−13	39	
18	Wigan Athletic (R)	38	9	9	20	47	73	−26	36	Qualification for the Europa League group stage and relegation to Football League Championship (Note: Wigan Athletic qualified for the Europa League group stage as the 2012–13 FA Cup winners.)
19	Reading (R)	38	6	10	22	43	73	−30	28	Relegation to Football League Championship
20	Queens Park Rangers (R)	38	4	13	21	30	60	−30	25	Relegation to Football League Championship

Source: Barclays Premier League
Rules for classification: 1) Points; 2) Goal difference; 3) Goals scored; 4) Play-offs (only if needed to decide champion, teams for relegation or teams for UEFA competitions).
(R) Relegated

=== League Cup ===
Reading entered the League Cup at the Second Round stage with the other Premier League clubs not involved in European competition. On 15 August, they were drawn at home to Peterborough United.

28 August 2012 Second Round	Reading	3–2	Peterborough United	Reading
20:00 BST	Pogrebnyak 16'; Gunter 19'; Knight-Percival 39' (o.g.)	BBC; Reading	Taylor 12'; Tomlin 17'	Stadium: Madejski Stadium; Attendance: 7,262; Referee: Andy D'Urso

26 September 2012 Third Round	Queens Park Rangers	2–3	Reading	White City, London
19:45 BST	Hoilett 14'; Cissé 71'	BBC; Reading	Gorkšs 16'; Shorey 76'; Pogrebnyak 81'	Stadium: Loftus Road; Attendance: 11,562; Referee: Roger East

30 October 2012 Fourth Round	Reading	5–7 (a.e.t.)	Arsenal	Reading
19:45 GMT	Roberts 12'; Koscielny 19' (o.g.); Leigertwood 20'; Hunt 37'; Pogrebnyak 116'	BBC [Reading]	Walcott 45+2', 90+6', 120'; Giroud 64'; Koscielny 89'; Chamakh 103', 120+3'	Stadium: Madejski Stadium; Attendance: 23,980; Referee: Kevin Friend

=== FA Cup ===
Reading entered the FA Cup at the Third Round stage with the other Premier League clubs, as well as those from the Championship. The draw was made on 2 December 2012, where Reading were drawn against Crawley Town on 5 January 2013.

5 January 2013 Third Round	Crawley Town	1–3	Reading	Crawley
15:00 GMT (UTC)	Adams 1'	BBC; Reading	Le Fondre 13', 49' (pen.); Hunt 44'	Stadium: Broadfield Stadium; Attendance: 5,880; Referee: Anthony Taylor

26 January 2013 Fourth Round	Reading	4–0	Sheffield United	Reading
15:00 GMT (UTC)	Hunt 6', 50'; Leigertwood 40'; McCleary 54'	BBC; Reading		Stadium: Madejski Stadium; Attendance: 14,715; Referee: Chris Foy

18 February 2013 Fifth Round	Manchester United	2–1	Reading	Manchester
20:00 GMT (UTC)	Nani 69'; Hernández 72'	BBC [Reading]	McAnuff 81'	Stadium: Old Trafford; Attendance: 75,213; Referee: Andre Marriner

== Squad statistics ==
=== Appearances and goals ===
As of match played 19 May 2013

No.	Pos	Nat	Player	Total		Premier League		FA Cup		League Cup	
No.	Pos	Nat	Player	Apps	Goals	Apps	Goals	Apps	Goals	Apps	Goals
1	GK	(Australia) AUS	Adam Federici	26	0	21	0	3	0	2	0
2	DF	(Wales) WAL	Chris Gunter	23	1	20	0	0+1	0	2	1
3	DF	(England) ENG	Nicky Shorey	21	1	16+1	0	2	0	2	1
4	MF	(Turkey) TUR	Jem Karacan	26	1	21	1	3	0	2	0
5	DF	(Republic of Ireland) IRL	Alex Pearce	21	0	18+1	0	1	0	1	0
6	DF	(Jamaica) JAM	Adrian Mariappa	32	1	29	1	2	0	1	0
7	FW	(Russia) RUS	Pavel Pogrebnyak	32	8	26+3	5	0	0	2+1	3
8	MF	(Antigua and Barbuda) ANT	Mikele Leigertwood	34	3	29+1	1	2	1	2	1
9	FW	(England) ENG	Adam Le Fondre	37	14	11+23	12	3	2	0	0
10	FW	(Republic of Ireland) IRL	Noel Hunt	30	6	10+14	2	3	3	2+1	1
11	MF	(Jamaica) JAM	Jobi McAnuff	41	1	38	0	1	1	1+1	0
12	MF	(Jamaica) JAM	Garath McCleary	37	4	15+16	3	3	1	2+1	0
14	MF	(Mali) MLI	Jimmy Kébé	19	5	16+2	5	0	0	1	0
15	DF	(England) ENG	Sean Morrison	21	2	15+1	2	3	0	1+1	0
16	MF	(Republic of Ireland) IRL	Jay Tabb	16	0	12	0	1	0	2+1	0
17	DF	(Latvia) LAT	Kaspars Gorkšs	17	2	14	1	0	0	3	1
18	FW	(Wales) WAL	Simon Church	1	0	0	0	0	0	0+1	0
19	MF	(Wales) WAL	Hal Robson-Kanu	30	7	13+12	7	2+1	0	2	0
20	MF	(England) ENG	Danny Guthrie	25	1	19+2	1	0+3	0	1	0
21	GK	(England) ENG	Alex McCarthy	14	0	13	0	0	0	1	0
23	DF	(Republic of Ireland) IRL	Ian Harte	18	0	15+1	0	1	0	1	0
24	DF	(England) ENG	Shaun Cummings	11	0	9	0	1	0	1	0
27	DF	(Republic of Ireland) IRL	Stephen Kelly	18	0	16	0	2	0	0	0
28	MF	(England) ENG	Hope Akpan	9	0	6+3	0	0	0	0	0
29	DF	(Portugal) POR	Daniel Carriço	3	0	1+2	0	0	0	0	0
30	FW	(England) ENG	Nick Blackman	11	0	3+8	0	0	0	0	0
33	FW	(Grenada) GRN	Jason Roberts	12	1	8+3	0	0	0	1	1
41	GK	(England) ENG	Stuart Taylor	4	0	4	0	0	0	0	0
44	FW	(England) ENG	Dominic Samuel	1	0	0+1	0	0	0	0	0

=== Top scorers ===
As of match played 19 May 2013

Place	Position	Nation	Number	Name	Premier League	FA Cup	League Cup	Total
1	FW	(England)	9	Adam Le Fondre	12	2	0	14
2	FW	(Russia)	7	Pavel Pogrebnyak	5	0	3	8
3	MF	(Wales)	19	Hal Robson-Kanu	7	0	0	7
4	FW	(Republic of Ireland)	10	Noel Hunt	2	3	1	6
5	MF	(Mali)	14	Jimmy Kébé	5	0	0	5
6	MF	(Jamaica)	12	Garath McCleary	3	1	0	4
6				Own goal	2	0	2	4
8	MF	(Antigua and Barbuda)	8	Mikele Leigertwood	1	1	1	3
9	DF	(England)	15	Sean Morrison	2	0	0	2
9	DF	(Latvia)	17	Kaspars Gorkšs	1	0	1	2
11	MF	(England)	20	Danny Guthrie	1	0	0	1
11	DF	(Jamaica)	6	Adrian Mariappa	1	0	0	1
11	MF	(Turkey)	4	Jem Karacan	1	0	0	1
11	MF	(Jamaica)	11	Jobi McAnuff	0	1	0	1
11	DF	(England)	3	Nicky Shorey	0	0	1	1
11	DF	(Wales)	2	Chris Gunter	0	0	1	1
11	FW	(Grenada)	33	Jason Roberts	0	0	1	1
Total					43	8	11	62

=== Disciplinary record ===
As of match played 19 May 2013

Position	Nation	Number	Name	Premier League		FA Cup		League Cup		Total	
Position	Nation	Number	Name	Yellow card	Red card	Yellow card	Red card	Yellow card	Red card	Yellow card	Red card
2	(Wales)	DF	Chris Gunter	1	0	0	0	0	0	1	0
4	(Turkey)	MF	Jem Karacan	2	0	0	0	0	0	2	0
5	(Republic of Ireland)	DF	Alex Pearce	1	0	0	0	0	0	1	0
6	(Jamaica)	DF	Adrian Mariappa	5	0	0	0	0	0	5	0
7	(Russia)	MF	Pavel Pogrebnyak	4	1	0	0	0	0	4	1
8	(Antigua and Barbuda)	MF	Mikele Leigertwood	3	0	0	0	1	0	4	0
9	(England)	FW	Adam Le Fondre	3	0	0	0	0	0	3	0
10	(Republic of Ireland)	FW	Noel Hunt	4	0	1	0	0	0	5	0
11	(Jamaica)	MF	Jobi McAnuff	5	0	0	0	0	0	5	0
14	(Mali)	MF	Jimmy Kébé	1	0	0	0	1	0	2	0
15	(England)	DF	Sean Morrison	0	0	1	0	1	0	2	0
16	(Republic of Ireland)	MF	Jay Tabb	2	0	0	0	0	0	2	0
17	(Latvia)	DF	Kaspars Gorkšs	2	0	0	0	0	0	2	0
19	(Wales)	MF	Hal Robson-Kanu	0	0	0	0	1	0	1	0
20	(England)	MF	Danny Guthrie	4	0	0	0	0	0	4	0
23	(Republic of Ireland)	DF	Ian Harte	1	0	0	0	0	0	1	0
24	(England)	DF	Shaun Cummings	1	0	0	0	0	0	1	0
27	(Republic of Ireland)	DF	Stephen Kelly	2	0	0	0	0	0	2	0
30	(England)	FW	Nick Blackman	2	0	0	0	0	0	2	0
33	(Grenada)	FW	Jason Roberts	2	0	0	0	0	0	2	0
Total				45	1	2	0	4	0	51	1

== Awards ==
=== Player of the season ===
Rank	Name
1	Adam Le Fondre
2	Alex McCarthy
3	Hal Robson-Kanu

=== Player of the Month ===
Month	Name	Award
January	Adam Le Fondre	Won

=== Manager of the Month ===
Month	Name	Award
January	Brian McDermott	Won

=== EA SPORTS PPI Team of the Week ===
Week	Position	Player
Week 9	DF	Kaspars Gorkšs
Week 13	DF	Sean Morrison
Week 22	DF	Alex Pearce
Week 22	MF	Jimmy Kébé
Week 22	FW	Pavel Pogrebnyak
Week 23	GK	Adam Federici
Week 25	DF	Ian Harte
Week 25	MF	Jimmy Kébé
Week 36	MF	Jem Karacan

== Team kit ==
The 2012–13 Reading F.C. kits.

Supplier: Puma
Sponsor(s): Waitrose

Home colours	Away colours	Goalkeeping colours
