= Alex McCarthy =

English footballer (born 1989)

- McCarthy with Southampton in 2025

Personal information
- Full name: Alex Simon McCarthy
- Date of birth: 3 December 1989 (age 36)
- Place of birth: Guildford, England
- Height: 6 ft 4 in (1.93 m)
- Position: Goalkeeper

Team information
- Current team: Leicester City
- Number: 29

Youth career
- Wimbledon
- –2006: Wycombe Wanderers
- 2006–2007: Reading

Senior career*
Years	Team	Apps	(Gls)
2007–2014	Reading	70	(0)
2007	→ Woking (loan)	1	(0)
2008	→ Cambridge United (loan)	1	(0)
2008	→ Team Bath (loan)	2	(0)
2009	→ Aldershot Town (loan)	4	(0)
2009–2010	→ Yeovil Town (loan)	44	(0)
2010	→ Brentford (loan)	3	(0)
2011–2012	→ Leeds United (loan)	6	(0)
2012	→ Ipswich Town (loan)	10	(0)
2014–2015	Queens Park Rangers	3	(0)
2015–2016	Crystal Palace	7	(0)
2016–2026	Southampton	141	(0)
2026–	Leicester City	12	(0)

International career
2010–2011	England U21	3	(0)
2018	England	1	(0)
- * Club domestic league appearances and goals as of 06:24, 2 November 2026 (UTC)

Alex Simon McCarthy (born 3 December 1989) is an English professional footballer who plays as a goalkeeper for EFL League One club Leicester City.

A product of Reading's Academy, McCarthy spent time out on loan in the Conference Premier before signing professional terms with the club in 2008. He made his Football League debut in 2009 whilst on loan to Aldershot Town and spent the following season at Yeovil Town before making his Reading debut in 2011. He later spent time on loan at Leeds United and Ipswich Town. McCarthy left for Queens Park Rangers in 2014, moving on to Crystal Palace the following year, before joining Southampton in August 2016. After making 165 appearances in all competitions at Southampton, McCarthy joined Leicester City in July 2026.

At international level McCarthy has represented England and made his debut for the under-21 team in 2010, appearing three times in total. In November 2018, he made his debut for the senior team.

== Club career ==
=== Early career ===
Born in Guildford, Surrey, McCarthy began his career as a schoolboy at Wimbledon and Wycombe Wanderers before joining Reading on a scholarship at 16. He was a regular in the Academy team for two years and was part of a group that included several future first-team players including Jem Karacan, Alex Pearce and Gylfi Sigurðsson. His first experience of senior football came in August 2007 on loan at Woking where he made one appearance cover for the injured Nick Gindre. On 26 March 2008, he joined fellow Conference Premier team Cambridge United on work experience, making his debut two days later in a 3–0 defeat to Kidderminster Harriers. He made no further appearances and returned to Reading before signing his first professional contract in July 2008. McCarthy moved on loan again on 24 October 2008, joining Conference South team Team Bath as injury cover. He made his debut the next day in the FA Cup fourth qualifying round against Salisbury City and also played in the first round defeat to Forest Green Rovers, making four appearances in total. Another short loan spell followed with McCarthy joining League Two club Aldershot Town for one month on 2 February 2009. He made his Football League debut 12 days later in a 3–2 defeat to Exeter City and played three further matches before returning to Reading at the beginning of March.

At the start of the 2009–10 season McCarthy joined League One club Yeovil on an initial six-month loan and made his debut on 8 August in a 2–0 home win over Tranmere Rovers. A month later he received the first sending-off of his career after fouling Stockport County's Nicholas Bignall, who was also on loan from Reading. McCarthy's loan spell was renewed in January 2010 and again in February, before being extended for the rest of the season on 24 March. Over the course of his spell he played 44 league matches and kept all 12 of Yeovil's clean sheets. Following his successful loan, McCarthy was given a new three-year contract at Reading, keeping him with the club until 2013. He again departed on loan in August 2010, joining Brentford, though he remained there for just one month before being replaced by fellow Reading loanee Ben Hamer.

=== Reading and various loan spells ===
After returning from loan at Brentford in September 2010, McCarthy spent the next five months on the bench as cover for Adam Federici. He eventually made his Reading debut on 19 February 2011, coming on as a substitute for the injured Federici in the 84th minute against Watford and helping to secure a 1–1 draw. With Federici out for six weeks with knee ligament damage, McCarthy had a run in the team and made his full debut three days later in a 2–1 win over Millwall. In his next outing he saved a penalty against Crystal Palace as Reading twice came from behind to draw the match 3–3. He also played an important role in the 1–0 FA Cup fifth round win over Everton, producing a late save to deny Leon Osman in a performance described as "tremendous" by former England manager Kevin Keegan. Despite another strong display in the next round against Manchester City at Eastlands, Reading lost the match 1–0 to a Micah Richards header. He continued in goal until 30 April when he was displaced by a fit again Federici for the 0–0 draw at Coventry City and remained an unused substitute during Reading's play-off campaign.

With Federici remaining the first choice Reading goalkeeper for the 2011–12 season, McCarthy was loaned to Leeds United for a month on 4 November to gain Championship experience. An injury to Andy Lonergan and the indifferent form of Paul Rachubka saw him go straight into the team for the match against Leicester City. He kept a clean sheet on debut as the match ended in a 1–0 win. Further clean sheets against Nottingham Forest and Millwall followed and were enough to keep him in the team ahead of the returning Lonergan. In the last match of his initial spell he saved an injury time penalty against Watford, allowing Leeds to rescue a point with a last minute equaliser. Following the match, he revealed that he was keen on extending his loan at Leeds, with Reading agreeing to renew it for a second month two days later. Ineligible to face his parent club on 17 December, he was replaced by Lonergan and made no further appearances, returning to Reading on 3 January 2012. He signed a new three-year contract with Reading on 9 January before joining Ipswich Town on loan until the end of the season. On his return to Elland Road with Ipswich he was sent off for handling the ball outside the penalty area with 20 minutes remaining. Ipswich, one goal up at the time, went on to lose the match 3–1. After 10 appearances, all coming in the league, he returned to Reading at the end of the season.

==== 2012–13 season ====
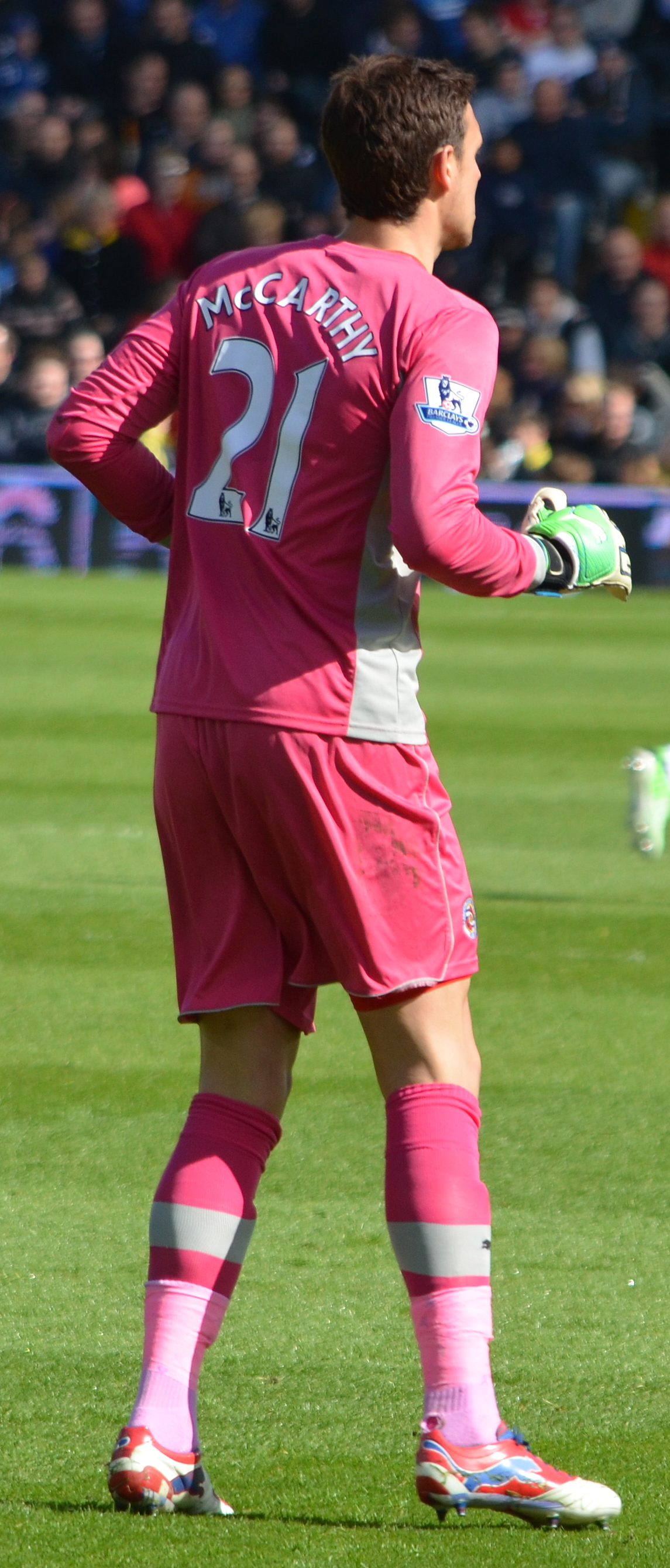
McCarthy playing for Reading in 2013

Again starting the season as second choice goalkeeper, several mistakes and an injury meant McCarthy replaced Adam Federici for the 3–1 defeat by Tottenham Hotspur on 16 September 2012. After debuting in the Premier League, he achieved the feat of playing in the six top levels of English football at the age of 22. He retained his place in the team for the next few matches and put in an impressive performance against Swansea City on 6 October leading to suggestions of a senior England call up in the future. His good form continued with a man of the match performance in Reading's next match against Queens Park Rangers, firstly tipping Esteban Granero's free-kick onto the crossbar before saving from Adel Taarabt at close range. The match ended badly though as he injured himself colliding with the goal post after diving to stop a Taarabt shot.

Despite initial hopes the injury was not too serious, he was forced to undergo shoulder surgery in early December potentially ruling him out for remainder of the season. He recovered quicker than expected though and returned to the team on 13 April 2013, keeping a clean sheet in a 0–0 draw with Liverpool. After making ten saves during the match, he was widely praised with his performance described as "fantastic" by Nigel Adkins and "absolutely staggering" by Liverpool manager Brendan Rodgers. He remained in goal for the rest of the season, making 14 appearances in total.

==== 2013–14 season ====
In the 2013–14 season, McCarthy became first choice keeper, making 44 appearances in the Championship as Reading finished 7th, just missing out on the playoffs.

=== Queens Park Rangers ===
On 29 August 2014, McCarthy joined newly promoted Queens Park Rangers in the Premier League for an undisclosed fee. McCarthy made his Rangers debut at home against Liverpool in a blockbuster narrow 3–2 defeat.

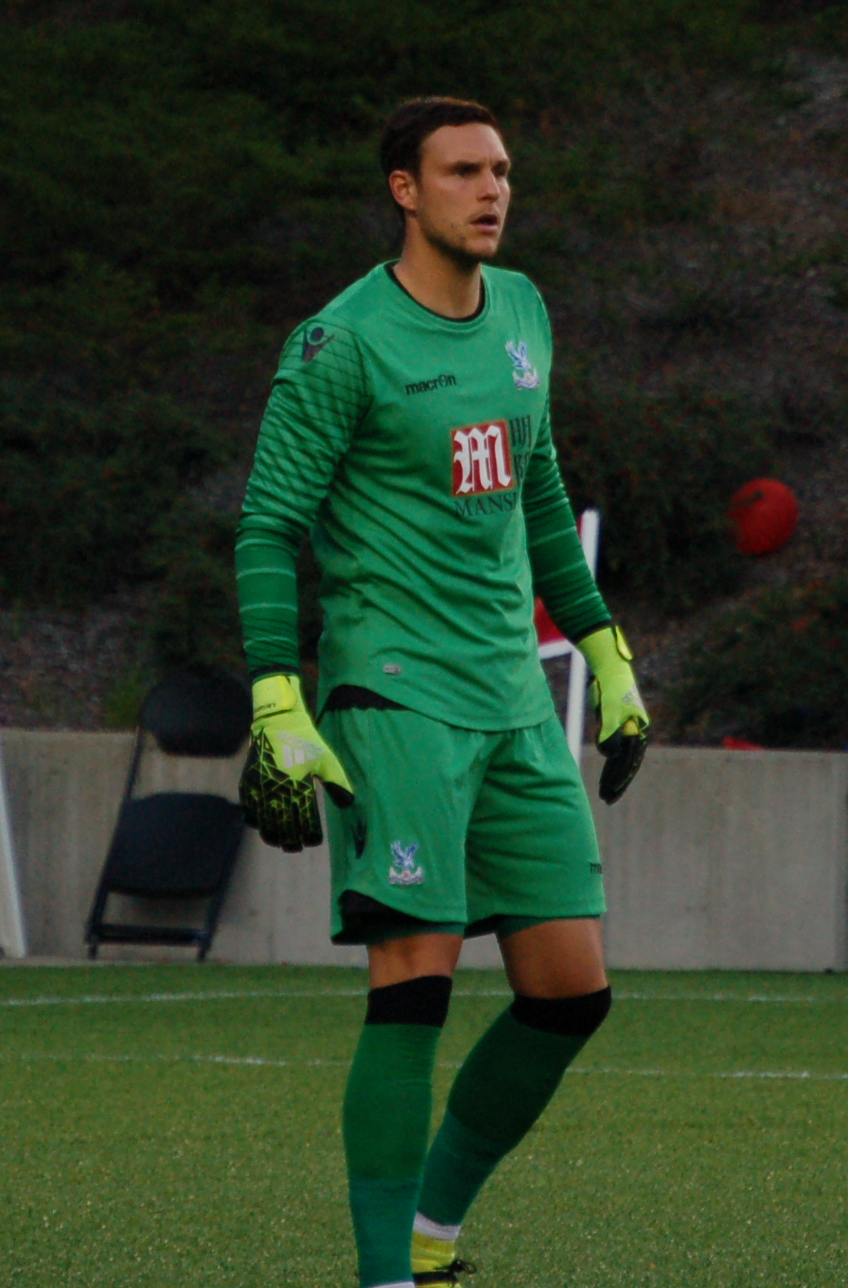
McCarthy playing for Crystal Palace in 2016

==== Crystal Palace ====
On 23 July 2015, McCarthy joined Premier League club Crystal Palace for an undisclosed fee, reported to be £3.5 million, on a four-year contract. McCarthy made his Palace debut on 8 August 2015 in a 3–1 win away to Norwich City.

=== Southampton ===
==== 2016–2018 ====
On 1 August 2016 McCarthy joined Southampton on a three-year contract, for an undisclosed fee. On 21 September 2016, McCarthy made his first appearance for Southampton in a 2–0 victory against former club Crystal Palace in the EFL Cup. McCarthy made no league appearances for the club during the 2016–17 season.

McCarthy was initially used as back-up to regular keeper Fraser Forster, but on 30 December 2017 he took over from the latter following the regular goalkeeper's drop in form and kept a clean sheet in a 0–0 draw against Manchester United. Following his breakthrough into the first team, McCarthy was named player of the season at the end of the campaign.

==== 2018–2021 ====
On 27 June 2018, McCarthy signed a new four-year contract with the club, keeping him on their books until 2020. This made him one of Southampton's highest-earning players, reflecting his status as first-choice keeper. However, he began the 2019–20 Premier League season as second choice behind Angus Gunn, with manager Ralph Hasenhüttl using McCarthy in the EFL Cup games. He made his first Premier League start of the season on 2 November 2019 in a 2–1 defeat to Manchester City after Gunn had conceded nine goals to Leicester City the previous match.

McCarthy made his first appearance of the 2020–21 season on 12 September 2020 in a 1–0 defeat to Crystal Palace. On 3 January 2021, it was announced that McCarthy had tested positive for COVID-19. The positive test saw him miss Southampton's 1–0 victory against Liverpool. McCarthy later revealed that he was advised to retire due to a heart condition caused by COVID-19. On 2 February 2021, he conceded nine goals to Manchester United.

==== 2021–2026 ====
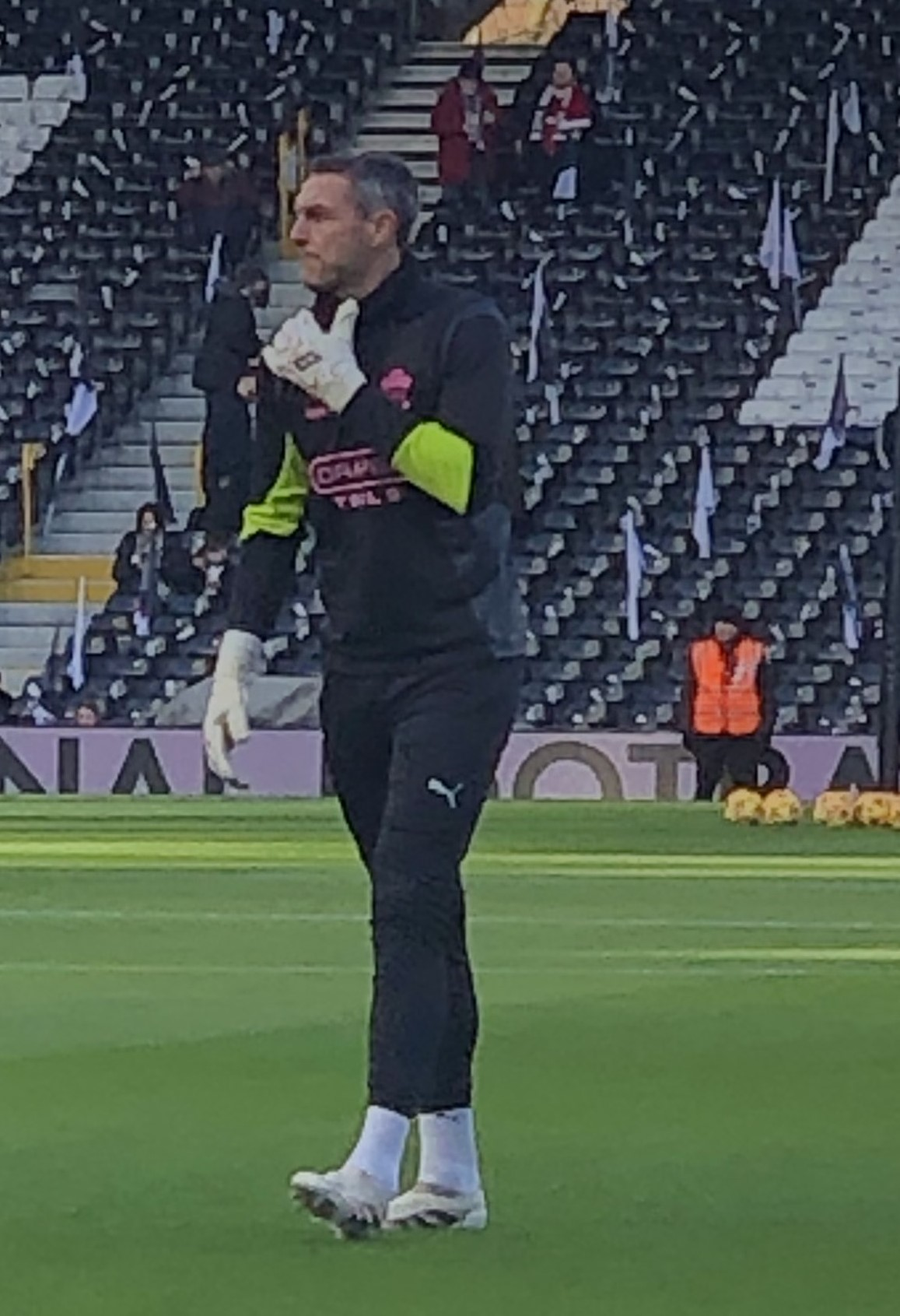
McCarthy training prior to the Premier League match between Fulham and Southampton at Craven Cottage

During the 2021–22 season, McCarthy would again start the campaign as first choice goalkeeper, and made his first appearance on 14 August 2021 in a 3–1 defeat to Everton. On 4 December 2021, McCarthy picked up an hamstring injury in a 1–1 draw with Brighton. Hasenhüttl criticised McCarthy after the match for failing to say he was injured during the game. The injury to McCarthy meant there were no senior goalkeepers available since Forster was also injured, and this led to Southampton signing free agent Willy Caballero. It would take until 17 May 2022 for McCarthy to feature again in a 2–1 defeat to Liverpool.

Following the arrival of Gavin Bazunu in the summer of 2022, McCarthy was limited to cup competitions at the start of the 2022–23 season. He regained his place ahead of Bazunu towards the end of the campaign, with manager Rubén Sélles stating that he is "important to us". The club were ultimately relegated from the Premier League at the end of the season.

On 16 April 2024, McCarthy replaced Bazunu in the lineup against Preston North End due to Bazunu picking up an injury in the warm-up. He played in the 2024 EFL Championship play-off final on 26 May against Leeds United, which Southampton won 1–0 to gain promotion to the Premier League.

On 28 June 2024, McCarthy signed a two-year contract extension. Following the conclusion of the 2025–26 season, he was released from Southampton.

=== Leicester City ===
On 16 July 2026, McCarthy joined Leicester City on a two-year contract. He made his debut for the club on 15 August in a 1–1 draw against Notts County.

== International career ==
McCarthy trained with the England under-19s before joining the under-21 set-up for the first time in September 2009. He received several further call-ups to the under-21s in 2009–10 and eventually made his debut as a second-half substitute against Uzbekistan in August 2010. In March 2011 he was named in a 31-man squad to face Denmark and Iceland as preparation for the UEFA European Under-21 Championship. He played a full 90 minutes in the first match and 45 in the second as England won 4–0 and lost 2–1 respectively. He travelled with the squad to championships in Denmark but did not play any matches, finishing with three caps at under-21 level.

In April 2012, McCarthy was named in the 80-man longlist of potential players for the Great Britain football team at the 2012 Summer Olympics, and in June, he made it down to the shortlist of 35 players provisionally selected for the tournament, although he did not make the final 18.

In May 2013 he was called up to the England senior team for the friendlies against Republic of Ireland and Brazil, becoming the first Reading youth team graduate to gain a full England call-up since the academy era began in 1998, although he did not make an appearance. On 1 September 2016, he was called up to the senior squad again by Sam Allardyce to replace the injured Fraser Forster for a 2018 FIFA World Cup qualifier against Slovakia.

In August 2018, McCarthy was called up for England's first squad since the 2018 World Cup, for matches against Spain and Switzerland. He made his debut on 15 November as a half-time substitute in England's 3–0 win over the United States at Wembley Stadium in a friendly match, nearly five and a half years after his first call-up.

== Career statistics ==
=== Club ===
As of match played 31 October 2026

Appearances and goals by club, season and competition
Club	Season	League			FA Cup		League Cup		Other		Total	
Club	Season	Division	Apps	Goals	Apps	Goals	Apps	Goals	Apps	Goals	Apps	Goals
Reading	2007–08	Premier League	0	0	0	0	0	0	—		0	0
Reading	2008–09	Championship	0	0	—		0	0	—		0	0
Reading	2010–11	Championship	13	0	2	0	0	0	0	0	15	0
Reading	2011–12	Championship	0	0	0	0	1	0	—		1	0
Reading	2012–13	Premier League	13	0	0	0	1	0	—		14	0
Reading	2013–14	Championship	44	0	0	0	0	0	—		44	0
Reading	2014–15	Championship	0	0	—		1	0	—		1	0
Reading	Total		70	0	2	0	3	0	0	0	75	0
Woking (loan)	2007–08	Conference Premier	1	0	—		—		—		1	0
Cambridge United (loan)	2007–08	Conference Premier	1	0	—		—		—		1	0
Team Bath (loan)	2008–09	Conference South	2	0	2	0	—		—		4	0
Aldershot Town (loan)	2008–09	League Two	4	0	—		—		—		4	0
Yeovil Town (loan)	2009–10	League One	44	0	—		1	0	—		45	0
Brentford (loan)	2010–11	League One	3	0	—		—		—		3	0
Leeds United (loan)	2011–12	Championship	6	0	—		—		—		6	0
Ipswich Town (loan)	2011–12	Championship	10	0	—		—		—		10	0
Queens Park Rangers	2014–15	Premier League	3	0	1	0	—		—		4	0
Crystal Palace	2015–16	Premier League	7	0	0	0	0	0	—		7	0
Southampton	2016–17	Premier League	0	0	0	0	2	0	0	0	2	0
Southampton	2017–18	Premier League	18	0	5	0	0	0	—		23	0
Southampton	2018–19	Premier League	25	0	0	0	0	0	—		25	0
Southampton	2019–20	Premier League	28	0	0	0	3	0	—		31	0
Southampton	2020–21	Premier League	30	0	0	0	1	0	—		31	0
Southampton	2021–22	Premier League	17	0	0	0	0	0	—		17	0
Southampton	2022–23	Premier League	6	0	1	0	2	0	—		9	0
Southampton	2023–24	Championship	5	0	0	0	1	0	3 (Note: Appearances in Championship play-offs)	0	9	0
Southampton	2024–25	Premier League	5	0	1	0	2	0	—		8	0
Southampton	2025–26	Championship	7	0	0	0	3	0	0	0	10	0
Southampton	Total		141	0	7	0	14	0	3	0	165	0
Southampton U23/U21	2016–17	—			—		—		1 (Note: Appearance(s) in EFL Trophy)	0	1	0
Southampton U23/U21	2017–18	—			—		—		3	0	3	0
Southampton U23/U21	Total		—		—		—		4	0	4	0
Leicester City	2026–27	League One	12	0	0	0	0	0	0	0	12	0
Career total			304	0	12	0	18	0	7	0	341	0

=== International ===
As of match played 15 November 2018

Appearances and goals by national team and year
National team	Year	Apps	Goals
England	2018	1	0
Total		1	0

== Honours ==
Southampton

- EFL Championship play-offs: 2024

Individual

- Southampton Players' Player of the Season: 2017–18
- Southampton Fans' Player of the Season: 2017–18
