= Eamonn Dolan =

Irish footballer and coach

Personal information
- Full name: Eamonn John Dolan
- Date of birth: 20 September 1967
- Place of birth: Galway, Ireland
- Date of death: 20 June 2016 (aged 48)
- Place of death: Reading, England
- Height: 1.78 m (5 ft 10 in)
- Position: Striker

Senior career*
Years	Team	Apps	(Gls)
1985–1990	West Ham United	15	(3)
1989	→ Bristol City (loan)	3	(0)
1990–1991	Birmingham City	12	(1)
1991–1993	Exeter City	26	(4)
Total		56	(8)

International career
1986–1989	Republic of Ireland U21	5	(1)

Managerial career
- 2002: Exeter City (caretaker)
- 2003–2004: Exeter City
- 2013: Reading (caretaker)
- * Club domestic league appearances and goals

Eamonn Dolan (20 September 1967 – 20 June 2016) was an Irish professional footballer and coach.

== Career ==
Dolan played as a striker, beginning his professional career with West Ham United. He made his debut on 9 May 1987 in a 2–0 home win against Manchester City coming on as a substitute for Mark Ward. It was his only appearance of the 1986–87 season. In the 1987–88 season, Dolan made only four appearances, three as a substitute. His first West Ham goal came on 30 September 1989 in a 2–3 home defeat to West Bromwich Albion. On 18 October 1989, Dolan made possibly his most notable appearance for West Ham. In 5–0 home defeat of Sunderland, he scored twice with his goal celebrations inspiring cartoons drawn by fanzine cartoonist, Phill Jupitus. He continued to play regularly until the end of November 1989 when he signed for Birmingham City He made 21 appearances in all competitions for West Ham scoring four goals.

Dolan joined Exeter in 1991, and this marked the beginning of a 13-year association with the club, although he only managed 26 league appearances for the club as his career was cut short in 1993 when he developed cancer. His testimonial was in September 1994 in a game between Exeter and West Ham.

He survived the condition, and continued to serve the "Grecians" as football in the community officer, youth coach, caretaker manager, and finally full-time manager, taking over after the club's relegation from the Football League in 2003. His first season in charge was fairly successful, steadying the ship after a difficult year, and almost qualifying for the playoffs, but he left the club in September 2004 to join Reading as academy manager.

=== International career ===
Dolan and his twin brother Pat Dolan were capped at Under-21 and youth level for Republic of Ireland national football team. He scored 10 goals in his first seven youth internationals. They both played at the 1985 FIFA World Youth Championship. Both had made their Irish international début at Republic of Ireland national under-17 football team level against Northern Ireland in the first ever fixture between the two nations at Seaview in a 6–1 friendly win in January 1985. Dolan scored a hat trick.

== Death ==
Dolan died of cancer on 20 June 2016.

On 5 July 2016, at the end of Dolan's funeral, Reading announced that the North Stand of Madejski Stadium would be renamed the "Eamonn Dolan Stand".
