= Alex Pearce (footballer, born 1988) =

Footballer (born 1988)

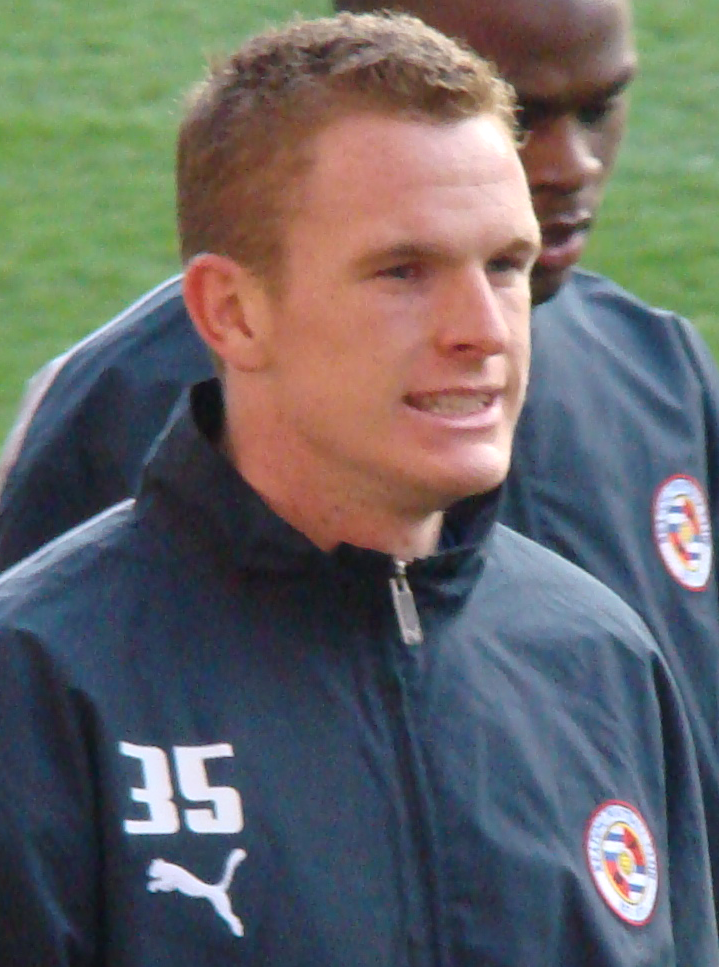
- Pearce with Reading in 2008

Personal information
- Full name: Alexander James Pearce
- Date of birth: 9 November 1988 (age 37)
- Place of birth: Wallingford, England
- Height: 6 ft 2 in (1.88 m)
- Position: Centre back

Team information
- Current team: Reading (academy coach)

Youth career
- 2001–2006: Reading

Senior career*
Years	Team	Apps	(Gls)
2006–2015	Reading	212	(14)
2007	→ Northampton Town (loan)	15	(1)
2007–2008	→ AFC Bournemouth (loan)	11	(0)
2008	→ Norwich City (loan)	11	(0)
2008	→ Southampton (loan)	9	(2)
2015–2019	Derby County	48	(3)
2016	→ Bristol City (loan)	7	(0)
2019	→ Millwall (loan)	11	(0)
2019–2022	Millwall	59	(0)
2022–2024	AFC Wimbledon	30	(0)
2024	Bracknell Town	5	(0)
2024–2025	Leatherhead	4	(0)

International career^{‡}
2006–2007	Scotland U19	3	(0)
2008	Scotland U21	2	(0)
2012–2017	Republic of Ireland	9	(2)
- * Club domestic league appearances and goals as of 12:29, 9 October 2024 (UTC) ‡ National team caps and goals as of 17:03, 5 October 2016 (UTC)

Alexander James Pearce (born 9 November 1988) is a former professional footballer who played as a centre back. He made two international appearances for the Scotland under-21 team but has played for the Republic of Ireland at full international level.

== Club career ==
=== Reading ===
Pearce was born in Wallingford, Oxfordshire and attended The Oratory School in Woodcote until Sixth form, when he dedicated his time towards attending Reading's youth academy. He signed a three-year professional contract with Reading on 23 October 2006 and made his Reading debut in an FA Cup third-round game against Burnley on 9 January 2007, coming off the bench to replace Ívar Ingimarsson in the 74th minute.

On 9 February 2007, he joined Northampton Town on a month's loan. He made his league debut in Northampton's 1–0 loss to Nottingham Forest, but received praise from manager Stuart Gray for his performance. He scored his first goal for Northampton in a 2–1 win over Scunthorpe on 8 April 2007. His loan was extended to the end of the 2006–07 season on 8 March 2007, returning to Reading in time to skipper the reserve team in the Premier Reserve League national final. In the final, Reading were crowned champions after a 2–0 win over Bolton Wanderers, with goals from Alan Bennett and Pearce, to secure the trophy that had been won by Manchester United for the previous two years.

On 2 November 2007, Pearce joined AFC Bournemouth on loan until 8 December, which was subsequently extended to 3 January 2008. On 21 December 2007, it was announced that Pearce had signed a new two-and-a-half-year contract. Nick Hammond said Pearce "has a superb work ethic and mentality which gives him every chance of a long and successful career here at Reading."

On his return from loan he played in the FA Cup fourth round replay against Spurs on 15 January 2008 at the Madejski Stadium, with the new England boss Fabio Capello in the stands. Pearce was handed his full debut at the start of the game, and put in a very solid performance before being sacrificed at half time as Steve Coppell made a tactical change and went from 5–4–1 to 4–4–2. Coppell said "People will think the substitution was based on performance, but that couldn't be further from the truth. We just had a game plan and stuck to it."

Pearce made another loan move on 31 January 2008, this time joining Championship side Norwich City until the end of the 2007–08 season. Upon his return to Reading he scored his first goal for them in a League Cup win over Luton Town on 26 August 2008. He then went on loan to Southampton on 31 October 2008 until the end of December. He made his debut at Preston North End on 1 November, scoring Southampton's first goal as they came from 2–0 down to claim a 3–2 victory.

Following the departure of Reading's manager Steve Coppell and the arrival of his replacement, Brendan Rodgers, Pearce was appointed Reading's vice captain. Due to an injury to new club captain Ívar Ingimarsson, Pearce started the 2009–10 in the first team side as captain. Pearce won Player of the Season for Reading in the 2011–12 Football League Championship winning season and was solid at the back all year whilst scoring goals of his own. Pearce signed a new two-year contract on 21 June 2013.

=== Derby County ===
Pearce signed a three-year contract with Derby County on 8 June 2015, with his Reading contract expiring at the end of the 2014–15 season. He made his debut for Derby in a League Cup tie against Portsmouth on 12 August 2015.

On 19 January 2016, Pearce joined Bristol City on loan for the remainder of the 2015–16 season.

On 29 October 2016, he scored his first goal for Derby in a 2–0 win over Sheffield Wednesday.

=== Millwall ===
On 4 January 2019, Pearce joined Millwall on loan for the second half of the 2018–19 season. He was released by Derby County at the end of the 2018–19 season. He signed for Millwall on 14 May 2019 on a free transfer. He was released on 20 May 2022.

=== AFC Wimbledon ===
Following his release by Millwall, Pearce joined AFC Wimbledon on 7 June 2022. He scored his first goal for AFC Wimbledon against Portsmouth at Fratton Park on 19 December 2023, a result that sent The Dons into the last 16 of the EFL Trophy. He departed the club upon the expiration of his contract at the end of the 2023–24 season.

=== Leatherhead ===
In October 2024, Pearce joined Isthmian League South Central Division club Leatherhead.

== International career ==
Despite being born in England, Pearce qualified to play for Scotland through his parents, and represented them at youth level. He made his debut for the Scotland U21 team in their 4–1 defeat to Norway U21 in Kilmarnock on 20 May 2008.

Also eligible to play for the Republic of Ireland, having played for Ireland at schoolboy level he made the switch to represent Ireland. In October 2011, he stated "The country I have always wanted to play for is Ireland."

Pearce was called into the full Ireland squad on 8 September 2012 ahead of an international friendly against Oman three days later. He scored a goal on his debut in a 4–1 victory on 11 September 2012. On 3 September 2014, he scored the second goal of a 2–0 win over the same opposition.

== Post–playing career ==
Since retiring from professional football, Pearce now has a role working as an academy coach at Reading.

== Career statistics ==
=== Club ===
As of 8 October 2024

Appearances and goals by club, season and competition
Club	Season	League			FA Cup		League Cup		Other		Total	
Club	Season	Division	Apps	Goals	Apps	Goals	Apps	Goals	Apps	Goals	Apps	Goals
Reading	2006–07	Premier League	0	0	1	0	0	0	—		1	0
Reading	2007–08	Premier League	0	0	2	0	1	0	—		3	0
Reading	2008–09	Championship	16	1	1	0	3	1	1 (Note: Appearance in Championship play-offs)	0	21	2
Reading	2009–10	Championship	25	4	1	0	2	0	—		28	4
Reading	2010–11	Championship	21	1	1	0	2	0	0	0	24	1
Reading	2011–12	Championship	46	5	1	0	0	0	—		47	5
Reading	2012–13	Premier League	19	0	1	0	1	0	—		21	0
Reading	2013–14	Championship	45	3	1	0	0	0	—		46	3
Reading	2014–15	Championship	40	0	6	0	3	0	0	0	49	0
Reading	Total		212	14	15	0	12	1	1	0	240	15
Northampton Town (loan)	2006–07	League One	15	1	0	0	0	0	0	0	15	1
AFC Bournemouth (loan)	2007–08	League One	11	0	0	0	0	0	1 (Note: Appearance in Football League Trophy)	0	12	0
Norwich City (loan)	2007–08	Championship	11	0	0	0	0	0	—		11	0
Southampton (loan)	2008–09	Championship	9	2	0	0	0	0	—		9	2
Derby County	2015–16	Championship	0	0	1	0	1	0	—		2	0
Derby County	2016–17	Championship	40	2	2	0	3	0	—		45	2
Derby County	2017–18	Championship	7	1	1	0	2	0	—		10	1
Derby County	2018–19	Championship	1	0	0	0	0	0	—		1	0
Derby County	Total		48	3	4	0	6	0	0	0	58	3
Bristol City (loan)	2015–16	Championship	7	0	0	0	0	0	—		7	0
Millwall (loan)	2018–19	Championship	11	0	4	1	0	0	—		15	1
Millwall	2019–20	Championship	29	0	2	0	0	0	—		31	0
Millwall	2020–21	Championship	24	0	2	0	0	0	—		26	0
Millwall	2021–22	Championship	6	0	1	0	2	0	—		9	0
Millwall	Total		70	0	9	1	2	0	0	0	81	1
AFC Wimbledon	2022–23	League Two	20	0	1	0	0	0	1 (Note: Appearance(s) in EFL Trophy)	0	22	0
AFC Wimbledon	2023–24	League Two	10	0	3	0	1	0	3	1	17	1
AFC Wimbledon	Total		30	0	4	0	1	0	4	1	39	1
Bracknell Town	2024–25	Southern League Premier Division South	5	0	1	0	—		0	0	6	0
Career total			418	20	33	1	21	1	6	1	478	23

=== International ===
As of match played 29 March 2016

Scores and results list the Republic of Ireland's goal tally first, score column indicates score after each Pearce goal.

List of international goals scored by Alex Pearce
No.	Date	Venue	Opponent	Score	Result	Competition
1	11 September 2012	Craven Cottage, London, England	Oman		4–1	Friendly
2	3 September 2014	Aviva Stadium, Dublin, Republic of Ireland	Oman		2–0	Friendly

== Honours ==
Reading

- Football League Championship: 2011–12

Individual

- Reading Player of the Season: 2011–12

== See also ==
- List of Republic of Ireland international footballers born outside the Republic of Ireland
- List of sportspeople who competed for more than one nation
